= List of Sri Lankan films of the 2000s =

Films produced in Sri Lanka in the 2000s (decade).

== 2000 ==
Title	Director	Cast	Genre	Notes
2000
Undaya	K. A. W. Perera	Priyankara Perera, Sangeetha Weeraratne, Sathischandra Edirisinghe, Lionel Deraniyagala, Channa Perera	Action, Drama	Released on 4 February.
Chakraayudha	G. D. L. Perera	Sriyani Amarasena, Sanath Gunathilake, Asoka Peiris	Action, Drama	Released on 11 February.
Re Daniel Dawal Migel 2	Roy de Silva	Bandu Samarasinghe, Tennison Cooray, Ranjan Ramanayake, Sangeetha Weeraratne, Ronnie Leitch, Gemunu Wijesuriya	Action, Comedy	Released on 31 March.
Saroja	Somaratne Dissanayake	Pramudi Karunarathne, Nithyavani Kandasami, Joe Abeywickrama, Janaka Kumbukage, Nita Fernando	Children's	
Kauda Bole Alice	Sunil Soma Peiris	Bandu Samarasinghe, Ravindra Yasas, Dilhani Ekanayake, Rex Kodippili, Suresh Gamage, Sonia Disa	Comedy	It is a remake of Tamil film Avvai Shanmughi and English film Mrs. Doubtfire.
Ali Patiyo Oyai Mamai	Lal Priyadeva	Bimal Jayakody, Bandu Samarasinghe, Ananda Wickramage, Vathika Ravinath, Prashani Perera, Teddy Vidyalankara	Children's, Comedy	Released on 24 August.
Dadabima	Louis Vanderstraaten	Nimal Sumanasekara, Chanky Ipalawatta, Anusha Damayanthi, Robin Fernando, Tissa Wijesurendra, Mark Samson, Wasantha Kumaravila, Wilson Karunaratne	Drama	Released on 30 June.
Danduwama		Ranjan Ramanayake, Dilhani Ekanayake, Nadeeka Gunasekara, Dilani Abeywardana, Cletus Mendis	Action, Romance	
Thisaravi	Darma Sri Wickramasinghe	Arjuna Kamalanath, Roger Seneviratne, Shehara Jayaweera, Igneshes Gunarathna, Deepani Silva, Susila Kuragama	18+, Adults	Released on 21 June.
Hansa Vilapaya	Shelton Payagala	Maureen Charuni, Lakshman Arachchige, Angela Seneviratne, Suvineetha Weerasinghe, Thilakarathna Liyanage, Wimal Wickramarachchi, Sirimathi Rasadari	18+, Adults	Released on 5 August.
Rajya Sevaya Pinisai	Udayakantha Warnasuriya	Sanath Gunathilake, Geetha Kumarasinghe, Joe Abeywickrama, Kanchana Mendis, Linton Semage, Nalin Pradeep Udawela, Nimal Antony	Drama	Releaeed on 11 August.
Ege Vairaya 4	Louis Vanderstraaten	Arjuna Kamalanath, Sumana Gomas, Srinath Maldeniya, Wilson Karunaratne, Suresh Gamage, Arjuna Kamalanath, Anusha Damayanthi, Seetha Kumari	18+, Adult	Released on 25 August.
Salupata Ahasata 2	Roy de Silva	Veena Jayakody, Srinath Maddumage, Anusha Sonali, Soniya Disa, Premila Kuruppu, Miyuri Samarasinghe, Alexander Fernando	18+, Adults, Drama	Released on 20 October.
Gini Gath Madhusamaya	Eranga Senarathna	Roshan Pilapitiya, Ranjith Gamini Perera, Saranapala Jayasuriya, Nimal Pallewatta, Anusha Damayanthi, Gamini Jayalath	18+, Adults	Released on 3 November.
Sanda Yahanata	Mohan Niaz	Sanath Gunathilake, Sabeetha Perera, Palitha Silva, Roshan Pilapitiya, Cletus Mendis, Mahendra Perera, Paboda Sandeepani	18+, Adult	Released on 3 November.
Anuragaye Ananthaya	Mohan Niyaz	Geetha Kumarasinghe, Lucky Dias, Palitha Silva, Rex Kodippili, Tony Ranasinghe, Mahendra Perera	18+, Adult	Released on 8 December.
Pem Kekula	Roy de Silva	Sanath Gunathilake, Dilhani Ekanayake, Sanoja Bibile, Robin Fernando, Wilson Gunaratne, Jayantha Bopearachchi, W. Jayasiri, Ronnie Leitch	Romance, Drama	Released on 8 December.

== 2001 ==
Title	Director	Cast	Genre	Notes
2001
Hai Baby Hai	Sunil Soma Peiris	Sonia Disa, Janesh Silva, Sunil Hettiarachchi, Ravindra Yasas, Dilani Abeywardana	Children's	Released on 5 January.
Kanyaviyage Raththriya	Louie Vanderstraeten	Arjuna Kamalanath, Srinath Maddumage, Teddy Vidyalankara, Tyrone Michael, Lakmal Fonseka, Wasantha Kumaravila	18+, Adults	Released on 26 January.
Jack and Jill	Dharmashri Wickramasinghe	Tennyson Cooray, Jayasekara Aponso, Dilhani Ekanayake, Susila Kottage, Arjuna Kamalanath	Comedy	Released on 22 March.
Kolamba Koloppan	Niroshan Deshapriya	Tennyson Cooray, Damith Fonseka, Dilhani Ekanayake, Alexander Fernando, Nandana Hettiarachchi, Teddy Vidyalankara, Lionel Deraniyagala	Comedy	Released on 23 March.
Oba Koheda Priye	Hemasiri Sellapperuma	Sanath Gunathilake, Sabeetha Perera, Tennyson Cooray, Ranjan Ramanayake, Freddie Silva, Wilson Karu, Bandu Samarasinghe	Romance	Released on 30 March.
Oba Magema Wewa	V. Siwadasan	Sabeetha Perera, Jeewan Kumaranatunga, Wilson Karu, Tissa Wijesurendra, Chandrasiri Kodithuwakku, Rodney Warnakula	Action, romance	Released on 27 April.
Pissu Puso	Sunil Soma Peiris; Sudesh Wasantha Pieris	Bandu Samarasinghe, Ravindra Yasas, Dilani Abeywardana, Freddie Silva, Susila Kottage	Comedy	Released on 2 May.
Kinihiriya Mal	H.D. Premaratne	Sangeetha Weeraratne, Kamal Addararachchi, Sanoja Bibile, Wasanthi Chathurani, Tony Ranasinghe, Roger Seneviratne	Drama, Adult	Released on 3 May.
Anantha Rathriya	Prasanna Vithanage	Swarna Mallawarachchi, Ravindra Randeniya, Yashoda Wimaladharma, Tony Ranasinghe	Drama	
Mahadena Muththai Golayo Roththai	Givantha Artasad	Cartoon	Children's, Funny	Second Cartoon Film & First Color Cartoon Film In Sri Lanka
Hai Hui Babi Achchi	Herbert Ranjith Peiris	Bandu Samarasinghe, Wimal Kumara de Costa, Ronnie Leitch, Gemunu Wijesuriya, Sunil Hettiarachchi	Comedy	Released on 4 July.
Jonsun and Gonsun	Roy de Silva	Ranjan Ramanayake, Tennyson Cooray, Sangeetha Weeraratne, Ruwanthi Mangala, Gemunu Wijesuriya, Sunil Hettiarachchi	Comedy	Released on 26 June.
Balakaamaya	Louie Vanderstraeten	Anusha Damayanthi, Thilak Jayaweera, Wimal Kumara de Costa, Sahan Wijesinghe, Hemantha Rathnakumara	18+, Adult.	Released on 27 July.
Poronduwa	Chandran Rutnam	Ravindra Randeniya, Vasanthi Chathurani, Asoka Peiris, Iranganie Serasinghe, Somy Rathnayake	Drama, thriller	Released on 10 August.
Me Mage Sandai	Asoka Handagama	Swarna Mallawarachchi, Dilhani Ekanayake, Saumya Liyanage, Anoma Janadari, Hemasiri Liyanage	Romance, Drama	Released on 10 August.
Wasanthaye Kunatuwak	Ranga Wijendra	Shashi Wijendra, Nadeeka Gunasekara, Priyankara Perera, Anusha Sonali, J. H. Jayawardena, Thilak Kumara Rathnayake, Kapila Sigera	Drama	Released on 24 August.
Jolly Hallo	Sri Lal Priyadeva	Bandu Samarasinghe, Nilanthi Diaz, Arjuna Kamalanath, Ananda Wickramage, Srinath Maddumage	Comedy, Drama	Released on 6 September.
Kumari Bambasara Handu Da	Dharmashri Wickramasinghe	Senaka Wijesinghe, Janaki Wijerathna, Thilak Ranathunga, Sumith Mudannayake, Lal Weerasinghe, Melani Asoka	Adult	Released on 21 September.
Dinuma Kageda	Ananda Wickramasinghe	Harshana Nanayakkara, Cletus Mendis, Mervyn Jayathunga, Sunil Hettiarachchi, Samanthi Lanerolle	Action	Released on 21 September.
Pasa Diya Gini Sulan Pahasa	Mano Weerasekera	Dr Sayakkara Jayawardana, Chelsi Manwel, Sureh Gamage	Historical	W. D. Amaradeva won Sarasawi award.
Purahanda Kaluwara	Prasanna Vithanage	Joe Abeywickrama, Mahendra Perera, Linton Semage, Priyanka Samaraweera, Nayana Hettiarachchi, Kumara Karunananda, Harshajith Abeysuriya	Drama	Released on 9 October.
Sundara Warada	Louie Vanderstraeten	Arjuna Kamalanath, Anusha Sonali, Wijeratne Warakagoda, Senaka Wijesinghe, Janesh Silva, Wijeratne Warakagoda, Chathura Perera	18+	Released on 26 October.
Daru Upatha	Sudesh Wasantha Pieris	Anusha Sonali, Roshan Pilapitiya, W. Jayasiri, Ravindra Yasas, Suvineetha Weerasinghe	18+, Adult.	Released on 13 November. The film screened actual birth of a child for the first time.
Mathu Yam Dawasa	Dharmasena Pathiraja	Wasantha Moragoda, Saumya Liyanage, Rukshana Miskin, Radha de Mel, Lionel Wickrama	Drama	Released on 23 November. The film shown at the Singapore International Film Festival and the 4th Osian's Cinefan Festival of Asian and Arab Cinema.
Rosa Wasanthe	Udayakantha Warnasuriya	Ranjan Ramanayake, Nisansala Jayathunge, Kanchana Mendis, Semini Iddamalgoda, Wijeratne Warakagoda, Buddhika Jayaratne	Romance	Released on 11 December.
Sellam Kukka	Louie Vanderstraeten	Arjuna Kamalanath, Anusha Damayanthi, Dilhani Ekanayake, Ravindra Yasas	Comedy	Released on 14 December.
Aswesuma	Bennett Rathnayake	Joe Abeywickrama, Jackson Anthony, Sangeetha Weeraratne, Ravindra Randeniya, Mahendra Perera	Drama	Film won FIPRESCI Prize at the Bombay International Film Festival.

== 2002 ==
Title	Director	Cast	Genre	Notes
2002
Mamath Geheniyak	Sudesh Wasantha Peiris	Roger Seneviratne, Anusha Sonali, Anusha Damayanthi, W. Jayasiri, Gayana Sudarshani, Premila Kuruppu, Dayananda Jayawardena, Chathura Perera	18+, Adult	Released on 21 February
Parliament Jokes	Ranjan Ramanayake	Bandu Samarasinghe, Tennison Cooray, Ranjan Ramanayake, Nilanthi Dias, Ananda Wickramage, Freddy Silva, Raja Sumanapala, G. R. Perera	Comedy	Released on 23 February
Sansara Prarthana	Sunil Soma Peiris	Jeewan Kumaranatunga, Ravindra Randeniya, Wasanthi Chathurani, Dilani Abeywardana	Drama, Romance	Released on 15 March
Seethala Gini Kandu	Daya Wimalaweera	Priyankara Perera, Channa Perera, Jeewan Kumaranatunga, Dilani Abeywardana, Dilhani Ekanayake, Kamal Addararachchi, Shashi Wijendra	Action thriller	Released on 22 March.
Pissu Double	Sunil Soma Peiris; Sudesh Wasantha Pieris	Ranjan Ramanayake, Vijaya Nandasiri, Bandu Samarasinghe, Dilhani Ekanayake, Freddie Silva	Comedy, Action	Released on 4 April.
Kalu Sudu Mal	Mohan Niyaz	Kamal Addararachchi, Dilhani Ekanayake, Veena Jayakody, Linton Semage, Yashoda Wimaladharma	Romance	Released on 24 May
Cheriyo Holman	Roy de Silva	Dilhani Ekanayake, Bandu Samarasinghe, Tennison Cooray, Rajitha Hiran, Susila Kottage, Janesh Silva	Comedy, Horror	Released on 24 May.
Kamasutra	Sunil T. Fernando	Anusha Damayanthi, Roshan Pilapitiya, Sumana Gomez, Seetha Kumari, Alexander Fernando	18+, Adults	Released on 3 July.
Pathiniyakage Horawa	Sri Lal Priyadeva	Arjuna Kamalanath, Roger Seneviratne, Eardley Wedamuni, Teddy Vidyalankara, Samudra Hikkaduwa	18+, Adults	Released on 9 July.
Thahanam Gaha	Christy Shelton Fernando	Cyril Wickramage, Asoka Peiris, Anoja Weerasinghe, Dilhani Ekanayake, Shashi Wijendra	Thriller	Released on 18 July.
Punchi Suranganavi	Somaratne Dissanayake	Tharaka Hettiarachchi, Nithyavani Kandasami, Sriyantha Mendis, Malini Fonseka, Dilani Abeywardana, Jayalath Manoratne, Namel Weeramuni	Children's, Drama	Released on 19 July.
Bahubuthayo	Udayakantha Warnasuriya	Mahendra Perera, Rodney Warnakula, Paboda Sandeepani, Richerd Manamudali, Vijaya Nandasiri, Anton Jude	Comedy, Horror	Released on 8 August.
Sudu Sewaneli	Sunil Ariyaratne	Jagath Benaragama, Wasanthi Chathurani, Gamini Jayalath, Roshan Pilapitiya, Linton Semage, Iranganie Serasinghe	Drama	Released on 8 August.
Magul Sakwala	Dharmashri Wickramasinghe	Nanda Wickramage, Rohitha Mannage, Dilini Jayasingha, Malki Fernando	18+, Adult.	Released on 20 August.
Jolly Halo 2	Sri Lal Priyadeva	Eardly Wedamuni, Arjuna Kamalanath, Nilanthi Dias, Sandeepa Sewmini, Teddy Vidyalankara, Ananda Wickramage, Srinath Maddumage, Upali Keerthisena	Comedy	Released on 5 September.
Mage Wam Atha	Linton Semage	Dilhani Ekanayake, Linton Semage, Gayani Gisanthika, Sarath Kothalawala, Saumya Liyanage, Mahendra Perera	Drama	Released on 6 September.
Onna Babo	Dinesh Priyasad	Sangeetha Weeraratne, Wimal Kumara de Costa, Shanudrie Priyasad, Ronnie Leitch, Don Guy, Janaki Wijerathna	Children's	Released on 4 October. It is a remake of Hollywood film Baby's Day Out.
Salelu Warama	Vasantha Obeysekera	Kamal Addararachchi, Sangeetha Weeraratne, Pradeep Senanayake, Tony Ranasinghe, Saumya Liyanage	Drama	Released on 8 October.
Love 2002	Roy de Silva	Tennison Cooray, Sangeetha Weeraratne, Jayantha Bopearachchi, Sunil Hettiarachchi, Sunil Hettiarachchi, Upali Keerthisena, Robin Fernando	Comedy, Romance	Released on 11 October.
Rosa Patikki	Eranga Senarathna	Asela Jayakody, Veena Jayakody, Prasannajit Abeysuriya, Gamini Jayalath, Nanda Wickramage, Nirdha Uyanhewa	Adult. 18+	Released on 11 October.
Sathkampa	Chandrarathna Mapitigam	Somy Rathnayake, Sabeetha Perera, W. Jayasiri, Cletus Mendis, Manike Attanayake	Drama	Released on 1 November.
Surapurata Kanyaviyak	Mario Jayatunga	Dilhani Ekanayake, Veena Jayakody, Srinath Maddumage, Suresh Gamage, Ravindra Yasas	18+, Adult.	Released on 28 November.
Somy Boys	A. A. Junaideen	Bandu Samarasinghe, Tennison Cooray, Sanath Gunathilake, Rex Kodippili, Rajitha Hiran, Savindi Silva	Action, comedy.	Released on 6 December.
Agnidahaya	Jayantha Chandrasiri	Yashoda Wimaladharma, Jackson Anthony, Kamal Addaraarachchi, Sanath Gunathilake, Buddhadasa Vithanarachchi	Action	Released on 13 December
Arumosam Wahi	Priyantha Colombage	Mahendra Perera, W. Jayasiri, Vasantha Vittachchi, Ajith Lokuge, Nuwangi Liyanage, Gnananga Gunawardena, Saranapala Jayasuriya	Drama	Released on 20 December.
Saragi	Louie Vanderstraeten	Ravindra Irugal Bandara, Nilu Hettihewa, Sudath Dodangoda, Wasantha Kumaravila	18+, Adult.	Released on 22 December.

== 2003 ==
Title	Director	Cast	Genre	Notes
2003
Pin Pon	Sudesh Wasantha Peiris	Ravindra Yasas, Kasun Chamara, Neetha Prabash, Maneesha Begham, Vijayakar	Drama, Comedy	Released on 1 January.
Sundarai Adare	Upali Piyarathne	Lal Weerasinghe, Dilhani Ekanayake, Bandu Samarasinghe, Cletus Mendis, Ruwanthi Mangala, Robin Fernando	Action, Romance	Released on 31 January.
Pura Sakmana	Tikiri Ratnayake	Anoja Weerasinghe, Cletus Mendis, Kanchana Mendis, Hemasiri Liyanage, Duleeka Marapana	Drama	Released on 12 February.
Vala In London	Hemasiri Sellapperuma	Ranjan Ramanayake, Tennyson Cooray, Sabeetha Perera, Freddie Silva, Teddy Vidyalankara, Gemunu Wijesuriya, Sunil Hettiarachchi	Comedy	Released on 12 February.
Thani Thatuwen Piyabanna	Asoka Handagama	Anoma Janadari, Mahendra Perera, Gayani Gisanthika, W. Jayasiri, Jagath Chamila, Wilson Gunaratne	Adult. 18+	Released on 26 February.
Aladinge Waldin	Upali Piyaratne	Tennison Cooray, Dilhani Ekanayake, Cletus Mendis, Sasanthi Jayasekara, Sunil Hettiarachchi	Comedy	Released on 3 March.
Vishma Rathriya	Sri Lal Priyadeva	Arjuna Kamalanath, Nilushi Halpita, Thanuja Niroshani, Eardley Wedamuni, Teddy Vidyalankara	18+, Drama	Released on 20 March.
Numba Nadan Apita Pissu	Milton Jayawardena	Arjuna Kamalanath, Sasanthi Jayasekara, Bandu Samarasinghe, Ananda Wickramage, Melani Asoka, Cletus Mendis	Comedy, Thriller	Released on 8 March
Sepata Dukata Sunny	Roy de Silva	Bandu Samarasinghe, Nilanthi Wijesinghe, Ananda Wickramage, Sangeetha Weeraratne, Ruwanthi Mangala, Sriyani Amarasena	Comedy, Drama	Released on 3 April.
Sansun Nosansun	Suresh Kumarasinghe	Arjuna Kamalanath, Janesh Silva, Nilushi Halpita, Chathura Perera, Rex Kodippili, Piyatillaka Atapattu, Chandani Silva	Action, thriller	Released on 8 May.
Taxi Driver	Kandapola Kumarathunga	Lal Weerasinghe, Cletus Mendis, Vijaya Nandasiri, Tennyson Cooray, Sunil Hettiarachchi	Action, comedy	Released on 9 May.
Le Kiri Kandulu	Udayakantha Warnasuriya	Sanath Gunathilake, Tony Ranasinghe, Nilmini Tennakoon, Buddhika Jayaratna, Sriyani Amarasena	Drama	Released on 9 May.
Wekande Walauwa	Lester James Peries	Sanath Gunathilake, Malini Fonseka, Vasanthi Chathurani, Sanath Gunathilake, Paboda Sandeepani, Iranganie Serasinghe, Lucky Dias	Drama, Family	Released on 22 May.
Pissu Trible	Sudesh Wasantha Peiris; Sunil Soma Peiris	Ranjan Ramanayake, Bandu Samarasinghe, Vijaya Nandasiri, Dilhani Ekanayake, Anarkali Akarsha, Anusha Damayanthi, Susila Kottage	Comedy	Released on 28 May.
Irasma	Ariyarathna Vithana	Ama Wijesekara, Maureen Charuni, Iranganie Serasinghe, Douglas Ranasinghe, Duleeka Marapana	Drama	Released on 3 June.
Sudu Kaluwara	Sudath Rohana	Sanath Gunathilake, Jayalath Manoratne, Buddhadasa Vithanarachchi, W. Jayasiri, Palitha Silva, Geetha Kanthi Jayakody	Drama	Released 4 September.
Jim Pappa	Sunil Soma Peiris; Sudesh Wasantha Pieris	Ravindra Yasas, Kasun Chamara, Semini Iddamalgoda, Neetha Kumari, Sisira Kumaratunga	Comedy	Released on 25 July.
Sonduru Dadabima	Anura Horatious	Dilhani Ekanayake, Srinath Maddumage, Sanath Wimalasiri, Yashoda Wimaladharma, Mahendra Perera, Kumara Thirimadura	Drama	Released on 25 July.
Yakada Pihatu	Udayakantha Warnasuriya	Ranjan Ramanayake, Semini Iddamalgoda, Anoja Weerasinghe, Dilhani Ekanayake, Suminda Sirisena, Menike Aththanayake	Action, thriller	Released on 27 August.
Bheeshanaye Athuru Kathawak	Amaranath Jayathilake	Cletus Mendis, Sarath Kothalawala, Nita Fernando, Vishaka Siriwardena, Mahendra Perera, G.R Perera, Miyuri Samarasinghe	Action	Released on 5 September.
Nombara Eke Chandiya	Sri Lal Priyadeva	Manjula Moragaha, Vasanthi Gunaratne	Comedy romance	Released on 27 September.
Sulang Kirilli	Inoka Sathyangani	Damitha Abeyratne, Linton Semage, Jayani Senanayake, Grace Ariyavimal, Buddhadasa Vithanarachchi, Bandula Vithanage	Drama, Adult.	Released on 11 September.
Sudu Salu	Gamini Laxman Fernando	Mahendra Perera, Nayana Kumari, Dilhani Ekanayake, Nilanthi Wijesinghe, Deepani Silva, Bertie Nihal Susiripala	Drama	Released on 16 October.
Hitha Honda Pisso	Sunil Soma Peiris	Jeevan Kumaratunga, Tennison Cooray, Dilhani Ekanayake, Anusha Damayanthi, Arjuna Kamalanath, Sunil Hettiarachchi, Susila Kottage, Sanoja Bibile	Comedy	Released on 26 November.
Sakman Maluwa	Sumitra Peries	Sanath Gunathilake, Kanchana Mendis, Vasanthi Chathurani, Rangana Premaratne	Drama	Released on 28 November.
Ege Daivaya	Sunil Soma Peiris	Rex Kodippili, Alexander Fernando, Kapila Sigera, Sisira Kumaratunga	Drama, 18+	Released on 25 December.

== 2004 ==
Title	Director	Cast	Genre	Notes
2004
Clean Out	Roy de Silva	Tennison Cooray, Anusha Damayanthi, Rodney Warnakula, Priyantha Seneviratne, Ananda Wickramage	Comedy, Family	Released on 6 February.
Sooriya Arana	Somaratne Dissanayake	Sajitha Anuththara, Dasun Madhusanka, Jackson Anthony, Jayalath Manoratne, Duleeka Marapana	Children's, Family	Released on 23 January.
Diya Yata Gindara	Udayakantha Warnasuriya	Sanath Gunathilake, Amarasiri Kalansuriya, Srimal Wedisinghe, Jeevan Handunnetti, Buddhika Rambukwella	Adult	Released on 4 March.
Bambara Senakeli	Nishantha de Alwis	Dilhani Ekanayake, Wimal Kumara de Costa, Jagath Benaragama, Sriyantha Mendis, Elson Divithurugama, Susan Fernando	18+, Adult.	Released on 19 March.
Sumedha	K. A. W. Perera	Vasanthi Chathurani, Jayantha Bopearachchi, Roger Seneviratne, Rex Kodippili, Jeevan Handunneththi, K.D. Siripala, Sarath Kothalawala	Musical, Romance	Released on 30 April.
Haadu Wessak	Louie Vanderstraeten	Arjuna Kamalanath, Lakshman Arachchige, Wasantha Kumaravila, Nilushi Halpita, Jude Muththyya, Nilushi Halpita, Aravinda Irugalbandara	18+. Adult.	Released on 12 May.
Ra Daniel Dawal Migel 3	Roy de Silva	Bandu Samarasinghe, Tennyson Cooray, Dilhani Ekanayake, Ananda Wickramage, Jayantha Bopearachchi, Gemunu Wijesuriya	Comedy	Released on 27 May.
Aadaraneeya Wassaanaya	Senesh Dissanaike Bandara	Chathurika Pieris, Roshan Ravindra, Sachini Ayendra, Malini Fonseka, Rajitha Hiran, Sahan Ranwala, Pradeep Senanayake	Drama, Romance	Released on 28 May.
Ginigath Horaawa	Louie Vanderstraeten	Arjuna Kamalanath, Anusha Sonali, Dayananda Jayawardena, Tyrone Michael	18+, Adult.	Released on 27 July.
Left Right Sir	Bandu Samarasinghe	Bandu Samarasinghe, Vijaya Nandasiri, Arjuna Kamalanath, Susila Kottage, Sanoja Bibile	Comedy, Family	Released on 21 August.
Selamuthu Pinna	Roy de Silva	Sanath Gunathilake, Nilanthi Dias, Athula Adhikari, Indika Upamali, Cletus Mendis	Romance	Released on 22 August.
Premawanthayo	Nishantha de Alwis	Swarna Mallawarachchi, Nadeeka Gunasekara, Jayalath Manoratne, Seetha Kumari, Indrajith Navinna	Drama	Released on 3 September.
Ohoma Harida	Sunil Soma Peiris	Arjuna Kamalanath, Tennyson Cooray, Sunil Hettiarachchi, Dilhani Ekanayake, Susila Kottage, Vijaya Nandasiri, Rex Kodippili	Comedy	Released on 9 September.
Gini Kirilli	Sarath Dharmasiri	Jayani Senanayake, Suminda Sirisena, Jayalath Manoratne, Meena Kumari, Cyril Wickramage	18+, Adult	Released on 17 September.
Katawath Kiyanna Epa	P.S.S. Peiris	Rex Kodippili, Dayananda Gunawardene, Kapila Sigera, Rex Kodippili, Vinodani Christopher, Chathura Perera, Sisira Kumarathunga	18+, Adult	Released on 1 October.
Samawenna Maa Raththarane	Kandapola Kumaratunga	Dilhani Ekanayake, Ananda Wickramage, Roshan Pilapitiya, Mark Samson, Sarath Chandrasiri	18+, Adult	Released on 1 October.
Mille Soya	Boodee Keerthisena	Sanath Gunathilake, Mahendra Perera, Sangeetha Weeraratne, Kamal Addararachchi, Ravindra Randeniya, Jackson Anthony	Family, Drama	Released on 21 October.
Rajjumala	Anura Chandrasiri	Bandu Samarasinghe, Dilhani Ekanayake, Roshan Pilapitiya, Suvineetha Weerasinghe, Nirosha Herath	Adult, Drama	Released on 21 October.
Underworld	Sudesh Wasantha Pieris	Arjuna Kamalanath, Nilanthi Dias, Wasantha Kumaravila, Rex Kodippili, Cletus Mendis, Robin Fernando	Action, thriller	Released on 19 November
Jolly Boys	Jude Muththyya	Arjuna Kamalanath, Sabeetha Kumari, Anusha Damayanthi, Janesh Silva, Ariyasena Gamage, Ronnie Leitch, Martin Gunadasa	Comedy	Released on 15 December.
Randiya Dahara	Udayakantha Warnasuriya	Sanath Gunathilake, Kamal Addararachchi, Geetha Kumarasinghe, Jackson Anthony, Anula Karunathilaka, Sanath Gunathilake, Mahendra Perera, Jeevan Kumaratunga	Drama, Thriller	Released on 17 December.

== 2005 ==
Title	Director	Cast	Genre	Notes
2005
Asani Warsha	Vasantha Obeysekera	Jagath Chamila, Kamal Addararachchi, Semini Iddamalgoda, Meena Kumari, Sanath Gunathilake, Veena Jayakody, Mahendra Perera, Semini Iddamalgoda	Drama, Family	Released on 1 January.
Sanduni	Suresh Kumarasinghe	Rex Kodippili, Arjuna Kamalanath, M. V. Balan	Children's	Released on 14 February.
Ira Madiyama	Prasanna Vithanage	Peter D Almeida, Nimmi Harasgama, Namal Jayasinghe, Mohamed Rahfiulla, Nadee Kammalaweera, Maheswari Rathnam, Gayani Gisanthika, Chandra Kaluarachchi	Drama	Released on 25 February.
James Bond	Sunil Soma Peiris	Bandu Samarasinghe, Tennison Cooray, Rex Kodppili, Buddhika Rambukwella, Susila Kuragama	Comedy	Released on 15 April.
Guerilla Marketing	Jayantha Chandrasiri	Kamal Addaraarachchi, Jackson Anthony, Sangeetha Weeraratne, Yashoda Wimaladharma, Mahendra Perera	Action, thriller	Released on 13 April.
One Shot One	Ranjan Ramanayake	Ranjan Ramanayake, Anarkali Akarsha, Anton Jude, Kanchana Mendis, Sahan Ranwala, Wilson Karu	Action, Comedy	Released on 19 May.
Meedum Wasanthe	Suresh Kumarasinghe	Arjuna Kamalanath, Rajitha Hiran, Nilanthi Dias, Rex Kodippili, Melanie Asoka, Damitha Saluwadana, Rajitha Hiran, Upali Keerthisena	Drama	Released on 7 June.
Sudu Kalu Saha Alu	Sudath Mahaadivulwewa	Dilhani Ekanayake, Sriyantha Mendis, Jayalath Manoratne, Mahendra Perera, Iranganie Serasinghe, Sanath Gunathilake	War, drama	Released on 29 July.
Samanala Thatu	Somaratne Dissanayake	Suminda Sirisena, Duleeka Marapana, Dulanjali Ariyathillake, Dasun Madushanka, Jayalath Manoratne, Giriraj Kaushalya, Vijaya Nandasiri	Children's family	Released on 5 September.
Sulanga Enu Pinisa	Vimukthi Jayasundara	Kaushalya Fernando, Nilupili Jayawardena, Hemasiri Liyanage, Mahendra Perera, Saumya Liyanage	Drama, Adult	Released on 14 May.
Kawuda Buwa	Suresh Kumarasinghe	Rajitha Hiran, Wasantha Kumaravila, Danushka Iroshini, Upali Keerthisena, Rex Kodippili, M.V. Balan, Manel Wanaguru, Damitha Saluwadana	Comedy action	Released on 9 June.
Sulanga	Bennett Rathnayake	Sanath Gunathilake, Chandani Seneviratne, Dilhani Ekanayake, Erandathi Rathnayake, Sriyani Amarasena, Palitha Silva	Drama	Released on 22 September.
Mata Thama Mathakai	K.M. Lingam	Rex Kodippili, Sapna Roshini, Sando Harris, Kapila Sigera, Mohan Hettiarachchi, Sisira Kumarathunga, Nimal Caldera, Vinu Wettamuni	Adult. 18+	Released on 28 October.
Ukusu Es	Suresh Kumarasinghe	Arjuna Kamalanath, Sapna Kareem, Wasantha Kumarawila, Thanuja Weerasekara	Adult. 18+	Released on 27 November.
Seethala Hadu	Louie Vanderstraeten	Rex Kodippili, Thanuja Weerasuriya, Nilushi Halpita, Wasantha Kumaravila, Kapila Sigera	18+. Adult.	Released on 2 December.
Samantha	Mario Jayatunga	Ganga Roshana, Suresh Gamage, G.R Perera, Miyuri Samarasinghe, Sureni Senarath, Premilla Kuruppu, Priyantha Wijekoon	Drama	Released on 2 December.
Alu Yata Gini	Samson Kumarage	Ranjan Ramanayake, Sanoja Bibile, Tony Ranasinghe, Wimal Kumara de Costa, Shammi Fernando, Nilanthi Dias, Dayananda Jayawardena	18+, Adult.	Released on 9 December.

== 2006 ==
Title	Director	Cast	Genre	Notes
2006
Naga Kanya	A. A. Junaideen	Dilhani Ekanayake, Sanath Gunathilake, Arjuna Kamalanath, Sriyantha Mendis, Norbert Rathnasiri, M.K. Sudakar	Mystery, Horror	Released on 7 January.
Hiripoda Wassa	Udayakantha Warnasuriya	Roshan Ranawana, Anarkali Akarsha, Chathurika Pieris, Pubudu Chathuranga, Jayalath Manoratne	Youth, masala	Released on 12 January.
Dedunu Wessa	Buddhika Jayaratne	Jeewan Kumaranatunga, Malani Fonseka, Rozan Dias, Buddhika Jayaratne, Madhumadhawa Aravinda, Nirosha Perera, Rajitha Hiran, Teddy Vidyalankara	Action	Released on 20 January.
Supiri Balawatha	Padmasiri Kodikara	Ranjan Ramanayake, Bandu Samarasinghe, Jeewan Kumaranatunga, Sunil Hettiarachchi, Cletus Mendis	Action, family	Released on 9 February.
Mihidum Salu Atharin	Anton Kingsley	Cletus Mendis, Suvineetha Weerasinghe, Nilanthi Wijesinghe, Niroshan Wijesinghe, Nirosha Herath	Adult, horror	Released on 17 February.
Eka Malaka Pethi	Mohan Niyaz	Nalin Perera, Ginger, Roshan Pilapitiya, Anarkali Akarsha, Rex Kodippili, Manel Wanaguru, Maureen Charuni, Buddhika Jayaratne	Romance	Released on 3 March
Samunoganna Sugandika	Williams Olams	Anusha Damayanthi, Gayan Seneviratne, Tony Ranasinghe, Wijeratne Warakagoda	Adult.	Released on 16 March.
Nilambare	Kelum Palitha Maheerathna	Ranjan Ramanayake, Sanath Gunathilake, Dilhani Ekanayake, Semini Iddamalgoda, Anton Jude	Romance	Released on 1 March.
Samaara	Sanjaya Nirmal	Kamal Addararachchi, Kanchana Mendis, Semini Iddamalgoda, Iranganie Serasinghe	Romance	Released on 10 May
Bherunda Pakshiya	Sarath Dharmasiri	Sriyantha Mendis, Indika Upamali, Richard Weerakkody, Buddhadasa Vithanarachchi, Jayani Senanayake, Miyuri Samarasinghe, Kusum Renu	Historical, drama	Released on 19 March.
Udugan Yamaya	Sudath Devapriya	Chandani Seneviratne, Suminda Sirisena, Mauli Fernando, Thisuri Yuwanika, Giriraj Kaushalya, Duleeka Marapana, Saumya Liyanage, Rex Kodippili, Susantha Chandramali	Released on 1 June	
Anjalika	Channa Perera	Channa Perera, Pooja Umashankar, Sanath Gunathilake, Anarkali Akarsha, Rex Kodippili, Narada Bakmeewewa, Maureen Charuni, Lakshman Mendis, Sanath Gunathilake, Rosy Senanayake	Romance	Released on 28 June.
Rana Hansi	Daya Wimalaweera	Dilhani Ekanayake, Bandu Samarasinghe, Kamal Addararachchi, Sunil Hettiarachchi, Anoja Weerasinghe, Cletus Mendis, Dilani Abeywardana	Comedy, masala	Released on 30 June.
Sonduru Wasanthe	Roy de Silva	Tharindu Wijesinghe, Chathurika Peiris, Niroshan Wijesinghe, Arjuna Kamalanath, Anusha Damayanthi, Anarkali Akarsha, Mahinda Pathirage	Romance	Released on 6 July.
Dharma Puthra	Louis Vanderstraaten	Wasantha Kumaravila, Anusha Damayanthi, Buddhika Rambukwella, Nimal Sumanasekara, Dayananda Jayawardena, Raja Fernando	Action, romance	Released on 4 August.
Ali Patio Oyai Mamai	Lal Priyadeva	Bimal Jayakodi, Bandu Samarasinghe, Ananda Wickramage, Vathika Ravinath, Prashani Perera, Teddy Vidyalankara, Eardley Wedamuni	Children's	Released on 24 August
Double Game	Suresh Kumarasinghe	Arjuna Kamalanath, Ameesha Kavindi, Sriyani Amarasena, Cletus Mendis, Rajitha Hiran, Wijeratne Warakagoda	18+, adult	Released on 27 September.
Kurulu Pihatu	Sumith Kumara	Jackson Anthony, Dilhani Ekanayake, Sajitha Anuththara, Suresh Gamage, Muthu Tharanga, Hemasiri Liyanage, Seetha Kumari, Sarath Chandrasiri	Drama, family	Released on 23 November.
Sewwandi	Vasantha Obeysekera	Dilhani Ekanayake, Kamal Addararachchi, Sangeetha Weeraratne, Chandani Seneviratne, Dilhani Ekanayake, Dayan Witharana, D.B. Gangodathenna	Adult, drama	Released on 7 December.0
Ammawarune	Lester James Peries	Sanath Gunathilake, Malini Fonseka, Thesara Jayawardane, Roshan Pilapitiya, Sarath Kothalawala, Douglas Siriwardena, Manjula Kumari	Drama, family	Released on 30 December. This is the last film directed by Dr. Lester.

== 2007 ==
Title	Director	Cast	Genre	Notes
2007
Sankara	Prasanna Jayakody	Thumindu Dodantenna, Sachini Ayendra, K. A. Milton Perera, Nilupa Heenkendaarachchi, Nethalie Nanayakkara, Nirdha Uyanhewa, Sakunathala Peiris	Drama, religious	Released on 25 January.
Mr Dana Rina	Roy de Silva	Sangeetha Weeraratne, Anusha Damayanthi, Arjuna Kamalanath, Rajitha Hiran, Priyantha Seneviratne, Anarkalli Aakarsha, Roshan Pilapitiya, Sunil Hettiarachchi	Family, comedy	Released on 23 February.
Ran Kevita	Udayakantha Warnasuriya	Harith Samarasinghe, Hisham Samsudeen, Vijaya Nandasiri, Bennett Rathnayake, Srinath Maddumage, Bennett Rathnayake, Sarath Chandrasiri, Saman Hemaratne, Susantha Chandramali	Children's	Released on 16 March.
Weda Beri Tazan	Sunil Soma Peiris; Sudesh Wasantha Pieris	Tennison Cooray, Rex Kodippili, Jeevan Kumaratunga, Manjula Thilini, Janesh Silva, Piumi Purasinghe, Susila Kottage, Sunil Hettiarachchi	Comedy action	Released on 27 April.
Sankranthi	Anuruddha Jayasinghe	Sangeetha Weeraratne, W. Jayasiri, Bimal Jayakody, Giriraj Kaushalya, Sunil Hettiarachchi, Hemasiri Liyanage, Seetha Kumari	Thriller, drama	Released on 11 May.
Tharaka Mal	Milton Jayawardena	Roshan Ranawana, Nalin Pradeep Udawela, Pubudu Chathuranga, Nadeesha Hemamali, Anarkali Akarsha, Muthu Tharanga, Pradeep Senanayake	Romance, drama	Released on 30 May.
Senehasaka Rajina				
Aganthukaya	Vasantha Obeysekera	Sanath Gunathilake, Chandani Seneviratne, Saumya Liyanage, Giriraj Kaushalya, Dasun Madushanka, Damayanthi Fonseka, Somasiri Alakolange	Drama	Released on 15 June.
Uppalawanna	Sunil Ariyaratne	Malani Fonseka, Sangeetha Weeraratne, Chandani Seneviratne, Roshan Ravindra, Suminda Sirisena, Sadali Welikanna	Drama, religious	Released on 27 July.
Hai Master	Ranjith Siriwardena	Jeevan Kumaratunga, Sabeetha Perera, Bandu Samarasinghe, Tennyson Cooray, Nihal Silva, Sunil Hettiarachchi	Action, comedy	Released on 3 August.
Sikuru Hathe	Giriraj Kaushalya	Vijaya Nandasiri, Anarkali Akarsha, Susila Kottage, Suraj Mapa, Tony Ranasinghe, Himali Sayurangi, Rodney Warnakula, Anton Jude	Comedy	Released on 27 July.
First Love Pooja	Kusumchandra Gamage	Sanoja Bibile, Anton Jude, Rajitha Hiran, Ariyasena Gamage	Romance	Released on 12 October.
Nisala Gira	Thanuj Anavaratna	Nita Fernando, Ravindra Randeniya, Iranganie Serasinghe, Saumya Liyanage, Nimmi Harasgama, Chandra Kaluarachchi, Damitha Abeyratne	Drama	Released on 12 September.
Asai Man Piyabanna	Udayakantha Warnasuriya	Roshan Ranawana, Pooja Umashankar, Sanath Gunathilake, Upeksha Swarnamali, Nalin Pradeep Udawela, Gayathri Dias,	Romance	Released on 1 November.
Jundai Gundai	Sunil Soma Peiris	Tennyson Cooray, Bandu Samarasinghe, Nilanthi Dias, Buddhika Rambukwella, Arjuna Kamalanath, Susila Kottage, Upali Keerthisena	Comedy	Released on 30 November.
Yahaluvo	Sumitra Peries	Sujeewa Senasinghe, Pooja Umashankar, Himasal Liyanage, Iranganie Serasinghe, Tony Ranasinghe, Kamal Addararachchi	Family.	Released on 11 June.
No Problem Darling	Kusum Chandra Gamage	Malinda Perera, Anusha Damayanthi, Suresh Gamage, Nilanthi Dias, Anton Jude, Rajitha Hiran, Rex Kodippili	Comedy.	Released on 21 December.

== 2008 ==
Title	Director	Cast	Genre	Notes
2008
Heart FM	Senesh Dissanaike Bandara	Gayan Wickramathillaka, Mahendra Perera, Chandani Seneviratne, Kanchana Mendis, Sachini Ayendra, Aruna Liyan, Samanalee Fonseka, Sahan Ranwala	Musical Romance	Released on 16 January.
Superstar	A. A Junaideen	Sanath Gunathilake, Manjula Thilini, Cletus Mendis, Rex Kodippili, Kanchana Mendis, G.R Perera, Ananda Athukorala	Action	Released on 31 January.
Hathara Denama Soorayo remake	Neil Rupasinghe	Roshan Pilapitiya, Chathurika Pieris, Jagath Chamila, Buddhika Jayarathne, Amila Abeysekara, Kanchana Mendis	Action, masala	Released on 19 February.
Siri Raja Siri	Somaratne Dissanayake	Dilhani Ekanayake, Kokila Jayasuriya, Jayalath Manoratne, Mahendra Perera, Shehan Randeniya, Giriraj Kaushalya, Rathna Lalani Jayakody	Children's	Released on 6 March.
Adara Meena	Keerthi Bandara	Roshan Pilapitiya, Nilanthi Dias, Sriyani Amarasena, Cletus Mendis, Geetha Kanthi Jayakody, Douglas Ranasinghe, Kapila Sigera	Romance, adult	Released on 14 March.
Prabhakaran	Thushara Pieris	Dasun Madushanka, Darshan Dharmaraj, Priyankara Rathnayake, Anuruddhika Padukkage, Sarath Dikkumbura, Aishara Athukorala, Sarath Dikkumbura	War, biographical	Released on 25 April.
Wada Bari Tarzan Mathisabayata	Sunil Soma Peiris; Sudesh Wasantha Pieris	Tennison Cooray, Piumi Purasinghe, Ananda Wickramage, Susila Kottage, Janesh Silva, D.B. Gangodathenna, Chathura Perera, Jeevan Handunnetti	Comedy	Released on 28 April.
Rosa Kale	Sanjaya Nirmal	Monica Maruthiraj, Roshan Ranawana, Sanath Gunathilake, Anton Jude, Iranganie Serasinghe, Kumara Thirimadura, Sarath Kothalawala	Mystery, family	Released on 15 May.
Walapatala	Vijitha Gunarathne	Jayani Senanayake, Saumya Liyanage, Palitha Silva, Anton Jude, Duleeka Marapana, Jayalath Manoratne, Gamini Haththotuwegama	Drama	Released on 27 May.
Ali Pancha Mage Mithura	Louie Vanderstraeten	Wasantha Kumaravila, Wilson Karu, Anusha Damayanthi, Ronnie Leitch, Martin Gunadasa, Sarath Dikkumbura, Vinoja Nilanthi	Children's	Released on 27 June.
Pitasakwala Kumarayai Pancho Hathai	Sirimal Wijesinghe	Sanath Gunathilake, Dilhani Ekanayake, Janaka Kumbukage, Nilanthi Wijesinghe, Suminda Sirisena, Hisham Samsudeen, Iraj Weeraratne	Children's, mystery.	Released on 24 July.
Sandalu Thalen Eha	Gamini Pushpakumara	Jagath Benaragama, G.R Perera, Asela Jayakody, Buddhika Indurugalla, Mapalagama Wimalaratne, Kapila Sigera	Action, thriller.	Released on 1 August. This is the first all-male Sri Lankan movie.
Aba	Jackson Anthony	Sajitha Anuththara, Ravindra Randeniya, Malini Fonseka, Saumya Liyanage, Sriyantha Mendis, Sabeetha Perera, Dulani Anuradha, Madhumadhawa Aravinda, Bimal Jayakody, Kasun Chamara	Epic, history, biography	Released on 8 August.
Machan	Uberto Pasolini	Mahendra Perera, Dharmapriya Dias, Kumara Thirimadura, Darshan Dharmaraj, Sujeewa Priyalal, Chathurika Pieris, Irangani Serasinghe, Pubudu Chathuranga	Comedy, sport	Released on 28 August
Sura Sapa Soya	Louie Vanderstraeten	Anusha Damayanthi, Lakshman Arachchige, Wasantha Kumaravila, Kapila Sigera	18+, adult.	Released on 17 September.
Rosa Diganthe	Suresh Kumarasinghe	Nilanthi Dias, Manjula Thilini, Rex Kodippili, Teddy Vidyalankara	Romantic	Released on October 23
Ai Oba Thaniwela	Ranjith Jayasinghe	Cletus Mendis, Veena Jayakody, Bandu Samarasinghe, Tennyson Cooray, Ronnie Leitch	Comedy, drama	Released on 28 August.
Adaraye Namayen	A. R. Sorriyan; N. Nathan	Roshan Ranawana, Kishani Alanki, Shan Gunathilake, Sanath Gunathilake	Romance, youth	Released on 21 November. It is a co-direction by Indian and Sri Lankan directors.
Nil Diya Yahana	Dayarathna Ratagedara	Saranga Disasekara, Chathurika Pieris, Sanath Gunathilake, Tony Ranasinghe, Chandani Seneviratne, Roshan Pilapitiya	Romance	Released on 18 December.

== 2009 ==
Title	Director	Cast	Genre	Notes
2009
Ali Surathal	Sudesh Wasantha Peiris; Sunil Soma Peiris	Jeevan Kumaratunga, Semini Iddamalgoda, Rex Kodippili, Sanath Gunathilake, Ananda Wickramage, Wasantha Kumaravila, Anton Jude	Children's, Action	Released on 1 January.
Leader	Ranjan Ramanayake	Ranjan Ramanayake, Adeen Khan, Anton Jude, Janesh Silva, Ronnie Leitch, Robin Fernando, Anusha Damayanthi	Action, romance, comedy	Released on 2 February.
Dancing Star	Susara Dinal	Dushyanth Weeraman, Shiroshi Romeshika, Malini Fonseka, Sanath Gunathilake, Sabeetha Perera, Roshan Ranawana, Ravindra Randeniya, Rosy Senanayake, Sarath Kothalawala	Musical, romance	Released on 12 March.
Sihina Devduwa	Vinu Veththamuni	Saliya Sathyajith, Thesara Jayawardane, Indika Fernando, Nanda Wickramage, Rajitha Hiran, Melani Asoka	Thriller, romance	Released on 6 March.
Sir Last Chance	Roy de Silva	Vijaya Nandasiri, Anarkali Akarsha, Arjuna Kamalanath, Nilanthi Dias, Lucky Dias, Anusha Damayanthi, Rodney Warnakula, Anton Jude	Comedy, romance	Released on 25 March.
Sinasuna Adaren	Eranga Senarathna	Pradeep Dharmadasa, Buddhika Jayarathna, Chathurika Pieris, Rodney Warnakula, Dilhani Ekanayake, Sriyantha Mendis	Romance	Released 23 April.
Rosa Mal Sayanaya	Nishantha de Alwis	Pradeep Dharmadasa, Manjula Thilini, Amarasiri Kalansuriya, W. Jayasiri, Jagath Galappaththi, Ruwan Madanayaka, Palitha Galappaththi	Adult 18+	Released on 7 May.
Paya Enna Hiru Se	Udayakantha Warnasuriya	Ranjan Ramanayake, Udari Warnakulasooriya, Nirosha Maithree, Bimal Jayakody, Pubudu Chathuranga	Family, romance	Released on 22 May.
Ekamath Eka Rateka	Sanath Gunathilake	Sanath Gunathilake, Chandani Seneviratne, Nirosha Perera, Semini Iddamalgoda, Kumara Thirimadura	Romance, drama	Released on 5 June.
Juliya	Sampath Sri Roshan	Sampath Sri Roshan, Charith Abeysinghe, Nadeesha Hemamali, Sasanthi Jayasekara, Ravindra Randeniya, Robin Fernando, Veena Jayakody	Romance, thriller	Released on 18 July.
Akasa Kusum	Prasanna Vithanage	Malini Fonseka, Nimmi Harasgama, Dilhani Ekanayake, Samanalee Fonseka, Kaushalya Fernando	Drama	Released on 21 August.
Bindu	Somaratne Dissanayake	Sachin Chathuranga, Ruwindika Thilini, Jayalath Manoratne, Kumara Thirimadura, Jayani Senanayake	Children's	Released on 22 September.
Thushara remake	Sahan Wijesinghe	Saliya Sathyajith, Shalika Edirisinghe, Rex Kodippili, Buddhika Rambukwella, Robin Fernando, Sonia Disa, Piumi Purasinghe	Romance, action	Released on 9 September.
Alimankada	Chandran Rutnam	Suranga Ranawaka, Ashan Dias, Athula Pathirana, Kumar Mirchandani, Priyantha Rambukenage	War	Released on 23 October.
Kanyavi	Siritunga Perera	Sanath Gunathilake, Meena Kumari, Pubudu Chathuranga, Dilani Madurasinghe, Himali Sayurangi	Drama, adult.	Released on 4 December.

== See also ==
- Cinema of Sri Lanka
- List of Sri Lankan films
