= Jaya Pita Jaya =

- Film poster
- Sinhala: ජය පිට ජය
- Directed by: Sunil Soma Peiris; Sudesh Wasantha Peiris
- Written by: Anton Kingsley
- Produced by: Sunil Soma Peiris
- Starring: Amisha Kavindi; Arjuna Kamalanath; Rex Kodippili
- Cinematography: Lalith M. Thomas; Gamini Moragollagama
- Edited by: Kumarasiri De Silva
- Music by: Keshan Perera
- Release date: 18 June 2010
- Country: Sri Lanka
- Language: Sinhala

Jaya Pita Jaya (Sinhala: ජය පිට ජය) is a 2010 Sri Lankan Sinhala action thriller film directed by Sunil Soma Peiris. It stars Amisha Kavindi and Arjuna Kamalanath in lead roles along with Rex Kodippili and Cletus Mendis. Music composed by Keshan Perera. It is the 1165th Sri Lankan film in the Sinhala cinema.

== Cast ==
- Arjuna Kamalanath as Vijay
- Amisha Kavindi as Rekha
- Cletus Mendis as Douglas
- Rex Kodippili as IP Saliya
- Chathura Perera as PC LM
- Janesh Silva as Sergeant Freddie
- Susantha Chandramali as Sandhya
- Susila Kottage as Vijay's granny
- Gunawardana Hettiarachchi
- Jeevan Handunneththi
- Kapila Sigera
