= Lantin Singho =

- DVD poster
- Sinhala: ලැන්ටිං සිංඤෝ
- Directed by: Aruna Mahendra
- Written by: K D Nikolaus
- Produced by: Hashani Film Arts
- Starring: Ananda Wickramage; Wimal Kumara de Costa; Kumara Thirimadura
- Cinematography: G Nandasena
- Edited by: Nishantha Pradeep
- Music by: Sarath Wickrama
- Distributed by: Lanka Film Distributors
- Release date: 25 September 2015
- Country: Sri Lanka
- Language: Sinhala

Lantin Singho (Sinhala: ලැන්ටිං සිංඤෝ) is a 2015 Sri Lankan Sinhala comedy film directed by Aruna Mahendra and produced by Hashani Perera for Hashani Film Arts. It stars Ananda Wickramage, Wimal Kumara de Costa and Kumara Thirimadura in lead roles along with Dilhani Ekanayake and Sanoja Bibile. Music composed by Sarath Wickrama. It is the 1236th Sri Lankan film in the Sinhala cinema. This is the last film played by veteran comedian Wimal Kumara de Costa, before his death.

== Cast ==
- Ananda Wickramage as Dudley Mithurusinghe / doppelgänger mad man
- Wimal Kumara de Costa as Sebastian
- Kumara Thirimadura as Molwatte Wimale
- Dilhani Ekanayake as Samadara
- Sanoja Bibile as Pilomina
- Duleeka Marapana as Nurse
- Giriraj Kaushalya as Appu
- Mohan Hettiarachchi as Marshall
- Manel Wanaguru as Rupawathi Meniyo
- Shanudrie Priyasad as Juliet
- Indika Deshapriya as Romeo
- Manike Attanayake
- Ronnie Leitch
- Buddhi Wickrama
- Gayathri Dias as Lisy
- Teddy Vidyalankara
- Nandana Hettiarachchi
- D.B. Gangodathenna

== Soundtrack ==
| No. | Title | Singer(s) | Length |
|---|---|---|---|
| 1. | "Onawenam Yanta Niwan" | Deshapriya Wickramasinghe |
| 2. | "Mage Hithe Obe Ruwa" | Keerthi Pasquel, Supriya Abeysekara |
| 3. | "Pipena Piyuman" | Amith Walpola, Latha Walpola |
| 4. | "Mage Hithe Tiyena" | Ronnie Leach, Kalawathi |
| 5. | "Ballo Nokana" | Deshapriya Wickramasinghe, Ishak Beg, Priyankara Perera |
