= Kusal (film) =

- Sinhala: කුසල්
- Directed by: Arjuna Kamalanath
- Written by: Arjuna Kamalanath; Suresh Kumarasinghe
- Produced by: Isuru Films
- Starring: Arjuna Kamalanath; Ameesha Kavindi; Thivru Dissanayake
- Cinematography: Dilan Gunawardana
- Edited by: Dilan Gunawardana
- Music by: Ranga Fernando
- Distributed by: EAP Cinemas
- Release date: 22 February 2018
- Country: Sri Lanka
- Language: Sinhala

Kusal (Sinhala: කුසල්) is a 2018 Sri Lankan Sinhala children's film directed by Arjuna Kamalanath and produced by Isuru Films. It stars director Arjuna Kamalanath himself with his wife Ameesha Kavindi along with child actor Thivru Dissanayake in lead roles along with Rajitha Hiran and Anura Dharmasiriwardena in supportive roles. Music composed by Ranga Fernando. It is the 1298th Sri Lankan film in the Sinhala cinema.

== Cast ==
The film has an ensemble cast. The film also stars a trained dog and a macaque.

- Arjuna Kamalanath as Jackie
- Ameesha Kavindi as Teesha
- Thivru Dissanayake as Kusal
- Rajitha Hiran as Somapala
- Anura Dharmasiriwardena as Edward
- Nirosha Thalagala as Geetha, Kusal's mother
- Ishan Mendis as Susantha, Kusal's father
- Chami Senanayaka as Master
- Anura Bandara Rajaguru as Hamu Mahaththaya
- Shiromika Fernando as Walawwe Menike
- Hemantha Eriyagama as Camp warden
- Premadasa Vithanage as Mudalali
- Kumari Senarathna as Janaki
- Luxman Amarasekara as Iratta
- Sandun Bandara as Kotta
- Sarath Silva as Tiger
- Gayan Weerasinghe as Guneris

Many child artists debut in the film along with lead child actor.

- Imalsha Uvindu as Little Kusal
- Senuri Nadeeshani as Somapala's daughter
- Dilmin Ranaweera as Kite boy
- Kanishka Hiruna as Pocket boy
- Sumeera Winwith as Bulty boy
- Sandaru Kumarasinghe as Dilum
- The macaque Kiriya as Punchirala
- The dog Tango as Sandy
