= Kiwwada Nahi Nokiwwada Nahi =

- movie title
- Sinhala: කිව්වද නහී නොකිව්වද නහී
- Directed by: Srilal Priyadeva
- Written by: Gamini Mendis
- Produced by: Janitha Films
- Starring: Ranjan Ramanayake; Tennyson Cooray; Arjuna Kamalanath
- Cinematography: Lalith M. Thomas
- Edited by: Kavinda Ranaweera
- Music by: Neil Warnakulasuriya
- Distributed by: CEL Films
- Release date: 5 September 2011
- Running time: 129 minutes
- Country: Sri Lanka
- Language: Sinhala
- Box office: 2 LK crore (12 days)

Kiwwada Nahi Nokiwwada Nahi (Sinhala: කිව්වද නහී නොකිව්වද නහී) is a 2011 Sri Lankan Sinhala comedy action film directed by Srilal Priyadeva and produced by Janitha Marasinghe for Janitha Films. It stars Ranjan Ramanayake, Tennyson Cooray, and Arjuna Kamalanath in lead roles along with Ananda Wickramage and Rex Kodippili. It is the 1162nd Sri Lankan film in the Sinhala cinema. This is brought debut cinema acting for Menaka Pieris. The film has influenced by 2008 Bollywood comedy film Golmaal Returns.

== Cast ==
- Ranjan Ramanayake as Kalana
- Tennyson Cooray as Sanath Perera
- Arjuna Kamalanath as Ronnie Wickramasinghe
- Ananda Wickramage as Dharme ayya
- Rex Kodippili as Ronnie's father
- Menaka Peiris as Kanchanamala
- Eardley Wedamuni as Parippu Some
- Teddy Vidyalankara as Headmaster
- Tyrone Michael as Kaluwa
- Jeevan Handunnetti as Postman
- Nandana Hettiarachchi as Somasundaram
- D.B. Gangodathenna as Somasundaram's father
- Chanchala Warnasuriya as Chamali, Sanath's wife
- Chathura Perera as Somasundaram's henchman
- Hemantha Iriyagama as Matchmaker
