= Kondadeniye Hamuduruwo =

- Kondadeniye Hamuduruwo
- Directed by: Siritunga Perera
- Written by: Sanath Samarakoon
- Based on: Novel by Nandasena Sooriyarachchi
- Produced by: Nalinda Prasad
- Starring: Ranjan Ramanayake; Mahendra Perera; Arjuna Kamalanath
- Cinematography: Pushpakuma Bandara Rajaguru
- Edited by: Pravin Jayaratne
- Music by: Amarasiri Peiris
- Production company: Art World Film Productions
- Country: Sri Lanka
- Language: Sinhala

Kondadeniye Hamuduruwo (Sinhala: කොන්ඩදෙනියේ හාමුදුරුවෝ) is an upcoming Sri Lankan Sinhala biographical fantasy film directed by Siritunga Perera and produced by Nalinda Prasad. It stars Ranjan Ramanayake in lead role along with Mahendra Perera and Arjuna Kamalanath. Music composed by Amarasiri Peiris.

The film was influenced by Nandasena Sooriyarachchi's novel Kondadeniye Hamuduruwo Kala Nikum (Wonders of Kondadeniye Thera). Muhurath ceremony was held with the presence of Prime Minister D. M. Jayaratne.

== Cast ==
- Ranjan Ramanayake as Ven. Kondadeniye Thero
- Mahendra Perera
- Arjuna Kamalanath
- Duleeka Marapana
- Sathischandra Edirisinghe
- Vasanthi Chathurani
- Bimal Jayakodi
- Kumara Thirimadura
- G.R Perera
- Somaweera Gamage
- Thanishka Wimalarathne
- Nipun Lanka
- Nivanka Darshani
- Mangala Madugalle
- Saman Weerasiri
- Mayura Thennakoon
- Ranjith Silva

=== Foreign artists ===
- Nathalia Ivanovna
- Alexander Ivanovna
- Elena Adaskova
- Swetlana Sergevana
