= Teddy Vidyalankara =

Sri Lankan actor, and stunt director (born 1955)

Teddy Vidyalankara ටෙඩී විද්‍යාලංකාර
- Born: Ganwari Teddy Vidyalankara; 16 December 1955 (age 70); Negombo, Sri Lanka
- Occupations: Actor, stunt director
- Years active: 1977 – present
- Spouse: Ann Seneviratne

Ganwari Teddy Vidyalankara (born December 16, 1955, as ටෙඩී විද්‍යාලංකාර [Sinhala]) is a Sri Lankan actor, and stunt director. Vidyalankara contributed more than 500 films across all languages including Sinhala, Tamil, English, Telugu and Hindi. He is the first stuntman to bring group stunts to Sri Lankan cinema.

== Early life ==
Born in 1955 at Negombo, he completed education from Carey College, Colombo. He started gymnastics and other free style martial arts at the small age with the influence of Bruce Lee films. He started boxing at the school and got a chance to practice martial arts course started at YMBA Hall performed by overseas stuntmen.

== Cinema career ==
In 1976, he attended to a party organized by his friend Shantha Kulatunga. At the party, he was able to meet one of oldest stuntman in Sinhala cinema, Dayananda Rodrigo. He invited Vidyalankara to participate as one of stuntman in the film Jeevana Ganga. His first stunt coordination came through the film Anusha in 1979.

Vidyalankara coordinate stunts in many foreign language films of many genre. This includes 22 English films, 14 Pakistani films, 12 Hindi and Tamil films. Some of his most notable stunt coordinations can be seen in the films such as Water, A Common Man, Midnight Children, Blood Heat and Jism.

== Filmography and stunt coordination ==
Key
†	Denotes films that have not yet been released

Year	Film	Roles	Ref.
1978	Asha Dasin	Stunt coordinator	
1979	Anusha		
1981	Sathweni Dawasa	Hanumantha	
1981	Thee	Stunt coordinator	Tamil film
1982	Bicycley	Eddie	
1982	Sanasanna Ma	also Stunt coordinator	
1983	Chandira	also Stunt coordinator	
1983	Chuttey		
1983	Athin Athata	Store fighter	
1983	Manik Maliga	also Stunt coordinator	
1984	Sasara Chethana		
1984	Rana Derana		
1984	Hadawathaka Wedana	also Stunt coordinator	
1984	Birinda		
1984	Jaya Sikurui		
1985	Mihidum Salu	Senaka's abductor	
1985	Raththaran Kanda		
1985	Channai Kello Dennai		
1985	Obata Diwura Kiyannam	also Stunt coordinator	
1985	Sura Duthiyo		
1985	Kirimaduwal		
1985	Nadaani		
1985	Jungle Heat	Stunt coordinator	
1986	Yali Hamuwennai	Willy's henchman	
1986	Prarthana	also Stunt coordinator	
1986	Peralikarayo	Teddy. also Stunt coordinator	
1986	Nobody Is Perfect		
1986	Dushyanthi	also Stunt coordinator	
1986	Jaya Apatai	also Stunt coordinator	
1986	Koti Waligaya		
1986	Hong Kong Ki Sholay	Pakistani film	
1986	Dinuma	Sujatha's guard. also Stunt coordinator	
1987	Yugayen Yugayata	also Stunt coordinator	
1987	Hitha Honda Chandiya	Henchman. also Stunt coordinator	
1987	Podi Wije		
1987	Nommara Ekai	also Stunt coordinator	
1987	Raja Wadakarayo	Henchman. also Stunt coordinator	
1987	Obatai Priye Adare	Fisherman. also Stunt coordinator	
1987	Dhonkaraya		
1988	Ayya Nago		
1988	Chandiyageth Chandiya		
1988	The Further Adventures of Tennessee Buck	Stunt coordinator	English film
1988	Nawa Gilunath Ban Chun	Stunt coordinator	
1988	Satana		
1988	Wana Rajina		
1988	Bloodsport	Stunt coordinator	English film
1989	Mamai Raja	Henchman. Stunt coordinator	
1989	Badulu Kochchiya		
1989	Obata Rahasak Kiyannam	Stunt coordinator	
1989	Nommara 17	Teddy. Stunt coordinator	
1989	Sinasenna Raththaran	Stunt coordinator	
1989	Waradata Daduwama		
1989	Randenigala Sinhaya	Teddy. Stunt coordinator	
1989	Sebaliyo		
1990	Yukthiyata Wada	Henchman. Stunt coordinator	
1990	Pem Rajadahana	Stunt coordinator	
1990	Chandi Raja	Stunt coordinator	
1990	Honda Honda Sellam	Ranabahu's henchman. Stunt coordinator	
1990	Hitha Honda Puthek	Stunt coordinator	
1990	Wana Bambara	Stunt coordinator	
1991	Paradise	Stunt coordinator	
1991	Wada Barinam Wadak Na	Stunt coordinator	
1991	Hithata Dukak Nati Miniha		
1991	Raja Sellan		
1991	Asala Sanda	Stunt coordinator	
1991	Ran Hadawatha		
1991	Cheriyo Doctor	Chance's henchman. Stunt coordinator	
1991	Bambara Kalapaya	Stunt coordinator	
1991	Mama Obe Hithawatha	Stunt coordinator	
1991	Be-Taab	Stunt coordinator	Pakistani film
1992	Raja Daruwo	Teddy	
1992	Sakwithi Raja	Stunt coordinator	
1992	Chandi Rajina		
1992	Sinha Raja		
1992	Me Ware Mage		
1992	Sathya	Stunt coordinator	
1992	Sinhayageth Sinhaya	Chula's henchman. Stunt coordinator	
1992	Rajek Wage Puthek	Stunt coordinator	
1993	Ottui Baruwata		
1993	Wali Sulanga	Illegal goods dealer. Stunt coordinator	
1993	Surayan Athara Veeraya	Rohitha's henchman. Stunt coordinator	
1993	Come O Go Chicago	Boss. Stunt coordinator	
1993	Jeevan Malli		
1993	Sandarekha	Stunt coordinator	
1993	Lassanai Balanna	Stunt coordinator	
1993	Lagin Giyoth Ahak Na	Stunt coordinator	
1994	Rajawansen Ekek	Teddy. Stunt coordinator	
1994	Ahas Maliga		
1994	Okkoma Hondatai	Stunt coordinator	
1994	Vijaya Geetha	One Shot. Stunt coordinator	
1994	Shakthi		
1995	Ira Hana Illa	Stunt coordinator	
1995	Deviyani Sathya Surakinna	Rex henchman. Stunt coordinator	
1995	Wairayen Wairaya	Stunt coordinator	
1995	Demodara Palama	Ravi's assistant. Stunt coordinator	
1995	Chitti		
1995	Chandiyage Putha	Nicholas' henchman. Stunt coordinator	
1995	Cheriyo Captain	Stunt coordinator	
1995	Chandani	Stunt coordinator	
1995	Chandi Kello		
1995	Dalulana Gini	Stunt coordinator	
1996	Body Guard		
1996	Naralowa Holman	Chief's henchman. Stunt coordinator	
1996	Mana Mohini	Stunt coordinator	
1996	Hiru Sanduta Madi Wee	Stunt coordinator	
1996	Seema Pawuru	Stunt coordinator	
1996	Mal Hathai		
1997	Puthuni Mata Wasana	Stunt coordinator	
1997	Punaruthpaththiya		
1997	Apaye Thathpara 84000k	Stunt coordinator	
1997	Raththaran Minihek		
1997	Ninja Sri Lanka		
1998	Aya Obata Barai	Stunt coordinator	
1998	Sathutai Kirula Ape	Stunt coordinator	
1998	Sagara Peraliya		
1998	Anthima Raya		
1998	Age Wairaya 3	Teddy. Stunt coordinator	
1998	Sexy Girl	Stunt coordinator	
1999	Surangana Yahana		
1999	Kolompoor	Brendan. Stunt coordinator	
1999	Nagaran	Stunt coordinator	
2000	Kauda Bole Alice	Stunt coordinator	
2000	Danduwama	Stunt coordinator	
2000	Sanda Yahanata	Stunt coordinator	
2000	Pem Kakula	Stunt coordinator	
2001	Kanyaviyage Rathriya	Stunt coordinator	
2001	Jack And Jill	Stunt coordinator	
2001	Kolomba Koloppan		
2001	Oba Koheda Priye	Teddy. Stunt coordinator	
2001	Pissu Puso	Stunt coordinator	
2001	Jolly Hallo	Stunt coordinator	
2002	Parliament Jokes	Stunt coordinator	
2002	Sansara Prarthana	Stunt coordinator	
2002	Pissu Double		
2002	Cheriyo Holman		
2002	Pathiniyakage Horawa	Stunt coordinator	
2002	Jolly Halo 2	Stunt coordinator	
2002	Onna Babo	Stunt coordinator	
2002	Somy Boys	Stunt coordinator	
2003	Sundarai Adare	Michael Fernando. Stunt coordinator	
2003	Vala In London	Gajasinghe's son	
2003	Vishma Rathriya	Stunt coordinator	
2003	Sepata Dukata Sunny	Henchman	
2003	Numba Nadan Apata Pissu	Stunt coordinator	
2003	Sansun Nosansun		
2003	Taxi Driver	Stunt coordinator	
2003	Sonduru Dadabima	Arsonist. Stunt coordinator	
2003	Yakada Pihatu	Stunt coordinator	
2004	Clean Out	Sudha's extra henchman. Stunt coordinator	
2004	Ra Daniel Dawal Migel 3	Thug. Stunt coordinator	
2004	Selamuthu Pinna	Stunt coordinator	
2004	Left Right Sir	Jimmy. Stunt coordinator	
2005	One Shot	Stunt coordinator	
2005	Water	Stunt coordinator	Hindi film
2006	Dedunu Wessa		
2006	Supiri Balawatha	Stunt coordinator	
2006	Anjalika	Stunt coordinator	
2006	Rana Hansi		
2006	Sonduru Wasanthe	Thug. Stunt coordinator	
2006	Ali Patio Oyai Mamai	Stunt coordinator	
2007	Mister Dhana Rina	Stunt coordinator	
2008	Hathara Denama Surayo remake	Stunt coordinator	
2008	Rosa Diganthe		
2009	Sir Last Chance	Stunt coordinator	
2009	Juliya	Lesli's henchman, Stunt coordinator	
2010	Mago Digo Dai	Digajanthu	
2010	Ape Yalu Punchi Boothaya	Uncle Tarzan	
2010	Sara	Stunt coordinator	
2010	Viyapath Bambara		
2011	Challenges	Stunt coordinator	
2011	Kiwwada Nahi Nokiwwada Nahi	Stunt coordinator	
2012	A Common Man	Pithala Nihal	
2012	Super Six	Stunt coordinator	
2012	Senasuru Maruwa	Stunt coordinator	
2012	Sri Siddhartha Gautama	Stunt coordinator	
2012	Jism 2	Henchman	
2012	Midnight's Children	Stunt coordinator	
2013	Peeter One	Stunt coordinator	
2013	Madras Cafe	Thug	
2014	Kalpanthe Sihinayak	Stunt coordinator	
2015	Mage Yalu Malu	Stunt coordinator	
2015	Sanjana	Stunt coordinator	
2015	Lantin Singho		
2016	Weerawarna	Soysa. Stunt coordinator	
2016	Paththini	Stunt coordinator	
2016	Maya 3D	Stunt coordinator	
2017	Appata Siri	Walankade Newton. Stunt coordinator	
2018	Yalu Malu Yalu 2		
2019	Reload	Bonny	
2020	Ethalaya		
2021	Hathara Varan	Edward's henchman	
2022	Rashmi		
2023	Meka Puduma Kathawak		
2024	Villain		
2024	Bambara Wasanthe		
2025	Housefull		
TBA	Adda Lanuwa Damma Kodiya †		
TBA	Nuhuru Vaeyama †		
TBA	Edath Dinum Adath Dinum †		
TBA	Aragalayak Meda †		
