= Lahiru Mudalige =

Sri Lankan television journalist and actor

Lahiru Mudalige ළහිරු මුදලිගේ
- Born: Mudalige Don Buddika Lahiru; April 5, 1983 (age 43); Kandy, Sri Lanka
- Education: Wariyapola Sri Sumangala College, Kandy; D.S. Senanayake College
- Alma mater: University of Suffolk
- Occupations: TV journalist; Director; Actor; TV host; Producer; International speaker
- Years active: 2002–present
- Website: official

Mudalige Don Buddika Lahiru (born 5 April 1983, Sinhala: ළහිරු මුදලිගේ), popularly known as Lahiru Mudalige, is a television journalist as well as a media manager, producer, social media personality, music video director, and an actor in Sri Lankan cinema, and television. Started as a child artist, Mudalige became one of the popular television presenters in Sri Lanka by hosting the musical programs Hithata Wadina Eka, Handa Radi Peya and chat program Coffee with Lahiru and Muditha in a career spanning more than two decades.

Apart from that, he is also the founder of popular YouTube channel Hari TV and Hari Global. He pioneered in establishing talk-show based subscribe community in Sri Lanka on social media, mainly on YouTube and bringing the concept of "Good Journalism on Social Media". Apart from that, he introduced legacy media models within social media platforms.

== Personal life ==
He was born on 5 April in Kandy, Sri Lanka as the eldest child of the family. He first attended to Wariyapola Sri Sumangala Vidyalaya, Kandy until G.C.E. O/Ls. Then he attended to D.S. Senanayake College, Colombo and completed his G.C.E. A/Ls. He completed his MBA from the University of Suffolk, England.

== Career ==
He joined the 'Kandurata Radio Service' at the age of seven and then in Lakhanda and Pavana radio. During his childhood at Sri Sumangala Vidyalaya, he joined with Muthuhara television program. At the age of 16, he joined with Lama Pitiya radio program as a presenter at Sri Lanka Broadcasting Corporation. While doing A/Ls at D.S. Senanayake Vidyalaya, he joined the school media association and performed as a media announcer. He also trained at Lakhanda Shilpa Yathra.

After the studies, he was invited to become a radio jockey at Raja FM in 2002 in which he continued until mid-2003. While working in the media, he got the opportunity to meet senior journalist Hema Nalin Karunaratne. Under his guidance, he joined Swarnavahini in 2003 and first worked as the presenter for the program Kala Eli Madala previously presented by Harindra Jayalal. Then he became the presenter of musical program Handa Radi Peya, which marked his turning point. He continued to work in the program from 2004 to 2015 years with the peak of his popularity in 2008. During this period, he introduced the daytime outdoor musical shows to Sri Lanka through television. Then he made the musical program ‘’Hithata Wadina Eka’’. In 2008, he was promoted to Manager Event Promotions of Swarnavahini.

In 2006, he made his maiden cinema appearance with the film Sonduru Wasanthe directed by Roy de Silva. In the film, he played a supportive role of 'Mahesh'. Then in 2009, he made a cameo appearance in the blockbuster film Sir Last Chance directed by Roy de Silva. At the same time, he started to act in the television serial Jeewithe Lassanai directed by Ravindra Wijeratne. The serial later became a hallmark in Sri Lankan teledrama industry. He continuously appeared in all 500 episodes in the serial with the popular role 'Kevin Benjamin'.

In 2008, he produced the morning chat program Coffee with Lahiru and Muditha along with fellow presenter Muditha Wijesundara initiated as a concept by Swarnavahini executive director Buddhika Kulasekara. It stopped in 2015 when there was a high audience response. In 2010, he produced the reality show Mega Star. In 2012, he joined with the cast of popular television serial Ruwan Maliga with a supportive role. With 15 years in Swarnavahini, he resigned from the positions at Swarnavahini in 2015 and started to produce music videos. In 2014, he made a supportive role of 'Prashan's friend' in the blockbuster film Kosthapal Punyasoma directed by Udayakantha Warnasuriya.

After television, he contributes to music video advertising, entertainment and various events on the Internet YouTube network. He is the founder and managing director of "Hari TV Pvt Ltd.", a YouTube based multi-channel platform since July 2017. Started with entertainment and advertising sectors, the channel was later expanded into political, social and economic talk-shows and interviews. He has created more than 600 music videos for both new coming and veteran artists and received several awards at Derana Music Video Awards. Within Hari TV, Lahiru created sub channels like Hari TV, Hari digital and She digital with over 1.1 million subscriber base and total Hari global media network now over 2.5 million subscribers and followers. The channel is also broadcast on Dialog MyTV as a dedicated channel. In 2019, he started teledrama production, where he produced the television serial Kanamediriyo telecast in ITN.

Since 2019, he works as the presenter of the program Standby With Lahiru. In 2020, he joined the cast of the television serial Api Ape. Lahiru along with his wife Sanduni, together they run a fashion line called "Colombo Batik". Meanwhile, Hari TV was the lead producer of the International documentary production The Shadow Pandemic involved Sri Lanka, Pakistan, Syria, Tunisia and Gambia.

Apart from working as a founder of Hari TV, Hari global, he is currently working as a manager promotion as well as presenter in EAP group.

== Television serials ==
| Year | TV Series | Role | Ref. |
|---|---|---|---|
| 2009 | Jeewithe Lassanai | Kevin Benjamin | |
| 2012 | Ruwan Maliga | | |
| 2012 | Malsara Geethaya | | |
| 2013 | Ammawarune | | |
| 2019 | Kanamediriyo | Producer | |
| 2020 | Api Ape | Sujeewa | |

== Filmography ==
| Year | Film | Role | Ref. |
|---|---|---|---|
| 2006 | Sonduru Wasanthe | Mahesh | |
| 2009 | Sir Last Chance | Lahiru | |
| 2014 | Kosthapal Punyasoma | Prashan's friend | |
