= Sunil Soma Peiris =

Sri Lankan filmmaker (1949-2021)

Sunil Soma Peiris සුනිල් සෝම පීරිස්
- Born: Pattiyage Sunil Soma Peiris; 13 April 1948; Maharagama, Ceylon
- Died: 10 December 2021 (aged 73); Maharagama, Sri Lanka
- Other names: P. S. S. Pieris
- Education: Buwanekaba Maha Vidyalaya
- Occupations: Director, producer, screen writer, actor
- Years active: 1968–2010
- Spouse: Malani Ayesha Perera (m. 1971)
- Children: 3
- Relatives: Sudesh Wasantha (son)

Pattiyage Sunil Soma Peiris (Pattiyage Sunil Soma Peiris, 13 April 1948 – 10 December 2021) (Sinhala: සුනිල් සෝම පීරිස්) was a Sri Lankan screenwriter, actor, editor and filmmaker in Sri Lankan cinema. He was a prolific director who directed the most films in Sri Lankan cinema with forty five commercial films in various genres.

== Personal life ==
He was born on 13 April 1948 in Maharagama, Ceylon, as the second child of the family with eight siblings. His father Salaman Peiris, was a businessman and mother was a housewife. He completed education from Buwanekaba Maha Vidyalaya, Maharagama. His school contemporaries are Nuwan Gunawardana, Amarasiri Peiris and Kandupola Kumaratunga.

In 1971, he married his longtime partner, Malani Ayesha Perera. The couple has two sons: Rohana Prema Kumara, Sudesh Wasantha and one daughter, Vasanthika Piyanga Kumuduni. Vasanthika's son Keshan Prasanna is a popular musician. His son Sudesh Wasantha Pieris is also a filmmaker, actor and playback singer of Sinhala cinema. Sudesh's daughter Chamathka is a songstress and playback singer.

Since the 1980s, he suffered minor complications with diabetes. In 2016, his body sugar increased and kidneys failed because of the effects of the drugs that he had taken for diabetes. At that time, he had a kidney transplant. Since 2016, diabetes got worse, where the left leg was cut below the knee and removed. In January 2019, a part of the right leg was also removed.

Peiris died on 10 December 2021 at his residence at the age of 72.

== Career ==
During school times, he acted in many Vesak dramas conducted in his hometown. Then he joined the drama group of Albert Gurunnanse and acted in Kolam dramas. He entered Sinhala cinema with a minor uncredited role in Henry Chandrawansa's film Vanagatha Kella. Then he made group characters in the films lakseṭa Koḍiya and Vahal Dūpata. While acting in the 1973 film Thushara as a stuntman, he informed the director Yasapalitha Nanayakkara about his passion to become a filmmaker. Therefore, he was finally selected as the second assistant director of the film. After the film, Sunil Soma became the first assistant director of Yasapalitha Nanayakkara and together they completed 18 films.

In 1985, he made his debut cinema direction with Obata Diwura Kiyannam. Then within 25 years, he made forty-five films. Out of the forty five films made by him, eight were co-directed with his son Sudesh Wasantha. In 1986 he co-directed the film Dinuma with Ananda Wickramasinghe. The first seven films (Obaṭa Divurā Kiyannam, Jaya Apaṭai, Mamai Rajā, Raja Wæḍakārayō, Yukthiyaṭa Væḍa, Dinuma and Obaṭai Priyē Aādarē) directed by Sunil Soma were screened for more than 100 days in a row, a record in Sinhala cinema. Also, his film Mamai Raja was screened for more than 200 days, a record in Sinhala film history. In 1993, he directed the Tamil film Sharmilavin Ithaya Ragam. Meanwhile, thirty-eight of his films were produced by Sunil T. Fernando, another record in Sinhala cinema for most films by same director-producer collaboration. Also, Sunil Soma is the second Sri Lankan filmmaker to direct films under two names. In some films, he used the name P. S. S. Pieris. (The first filmmaker was K. Venkatasalam who directed films under the name K. Venkat.)

In 1986, he directed the film Obatai Priye Adare which was screened in 1987. Before the assassination of lead actor Vijaya Kumaratunga in February 1987, the film ran 75 days with less income. But after the assassination, the film ran for 130 days and became a blockbuster. On the final day of screening at Ritz Hall, the film crew donated 10 wheelchairs to commemorate Kumaratunga. In 1989, his film Mamai Raja became a blockbuster hit and passed 100 days. After reaching 100 days, producers Sonia Disa and Sunil T. opened two bank books for Kumaratunga's children, Vimukthi and Yashodara and Rs. 25,000 was deposited. Sunil Soma introduced many actors and actresses to the Sinhala film such as: Anoja Weerasinghe, Anusha Damayanthi, Ruwanthi Mangala, Damith Fonseka, Shashi Wijendra, Arjuna Kamalanath and Anarkali Akarsha.

In 1997, he entered active politics where he became a Member of the Maharagama Urban Council.

== Filmography ==
=== As a director ===
Year	Film	Roles	Ref.
1985	Obata Diwura Kiyannam	Director, Screenwriter, Actor: Record store clerk	
1986	Jaya Apatai	Director, Screenwriter	
1986	Dinuma	Director, Actor: Station Inspector	
1987	Raja Wadakarayo	Director, Screenwriter	
1987	Obatai Priye Adare	Director, Screenwriter	
1989	Mamai Raja	Director, Screenwriter, Actor: Reprimanding Inspector	
1989	Obata Rahasak Kiyannam	Director, Screenwriter	
1989	Sinasenna Raththaran	Director, Screenwriter	
1990	Yukthiyata Weda	Director	
1990	Chandi Raja	Director, Screenwriter	
1991	Raja Sellam	Director, Screenwriter	
1991	Ran Hadawatha	Director, Screenwriter	
1992	Sakwithi Raja	Director, Screenwriter	
1992	Chandi Rajina	Director	
1992	Sinhayangeth Sinhaya	Director, Screenwriter, Actor: Inspector Lionel Saparamadu	
1993	Sharmilavin Ithaya Ragam	Director	
1993	Lassanai Balanna	Director	
1995	Wasana Wewa	Director, Screenwriter, Dialogues	
1995	Ira Handa Illa	Director	
1995	Chandiyage Putha	Director, Screenwriter	
1995	Chandani	Director, Screenwriter	
1996	Raththaran Malli	Director	
1997	Puthuni Mata Wasana	Director, Screenwriter	
1998	Aeya Obata Barai	Director	
1998	Sathutai Kirula Ape	Director	
1998	Sexy Girl	Director, Screenwriter	
1998	Mohothin Mohotha	Director	
2000	Kauda Bole Alice	Director, Screenwriter	
2001	Hai Baby Hai	Director, Screenwriter	
2001	Pissu Puso	Director, Screenwriter	
2002	Sansara Prarthana	Director, Screenwriter	
2002	Pissu Double	Director	
2003	Pissu Trible	Director, Screenwriter	
2003	Jim Pappa	Director, Screenwriter	
2003	Hitha Honda Pisso	Director	
2003	Aege Daivaya	Director, Screenwriter	
2004	Ohoma Harida	Director, Screenwriter	
2004	Katawath Kiyanna Epa	Director, Screenwriter	
2005	James Bond	Director, Screenwriter	
2005	Mata Thama Mathakai	Director, Screenwriter, Producer	
2007	Weda Beri Tarzan	Director, Screenwriter, Technical Advisor	
2007	Jundai Gundai	Director, Screenwriter	
2008	Wada Bari Tarzan Mathisabayata	Director, Screenwriter, Dialogues	
2009	Ali Surathal	Director, Screenwriter	
2010	Jaya Pita Jaya	Director, Screenwriter, Producer	

=== Other roles ===
Year	Film	Roles	Ref.
1968	Vahal Dupatha	uncredited role	
1970	Lakseta Kodiya	uncredited role	
1973	Thushara	Second Assistant Director	
1976	Pradeepe Ma Wewa	Assistant Director	
1978	Tikira	Assistant Director	
1979	Geheniyak	Assistant Director	
1979	Monarathenna	Assistant Director, Assistant Film Editor, Actor: Hatha	
1980	Tak Tik Tuk	Assistant Director, Assistant Film Editor	
1980	Muwan Palessa 2	Assistant Director, Actor: Sagaya	
1981	Amme Mata Samawenna	Assistant Director	
1981	Geethika	Assistant Director	
1982	Newatha Hamuwemu	Assistant Director, Assistant Film Editor, Actor: Canteen Mana	
1983	Ran Mini Muthu		
1983	Sister Mary	Assistant Director, Assistant Film Editor	
1984	Jaya Sikurui	Assistant Director	
1985	Aeya Waradida Oba Kiyanna	Assistant Director	
1985	Mihidum Salu		
1997	Savithirige Rathirya	Screenwriter	
1998	Julietge Bhumikawa	Somasekera	
1999	Unusum Rathriya	Screenwriter	
1999	Anduru Sewanali	Screenwriter	
2001	Daru Upatha	Screenwriter	
2002	Miss Lanka	Co-producer	
2002	Mamath Geheniyak	Screenwriter	
2003	Pin Pon	Screenwriter	
