= Igillenna Ai Dagalanne =

- Film poster
- Sinhala: ඉගිල්ලෙන්න ඇයි දඟලන්නේ
- Directed by: Arjuna Kamalanath
- Written by: Arjuna Kamalanath
- Produced by: Isuru Films; Arosha Fernando
- Starring: Arjuna Kamalanath; Ameesha Kavindi
- Cinematography: Sajitha Weerapperuma
- Edited by: Kavinda Ranaweera
- Music by: Keshan Perera
- Distributed by: Ridma circuit cinema
- Release date: July 18, 2013
- Country: Sri Lanka
- Language: Sinhala

Igillenna Ai Dagalanne (Sinhala: ඉඟිල්ලෙන්න ඇයි දඟලන්නේ) is a 2013 Sri Lankan Sinhala action film directed by Arjuna Kamalanath and co-produced by Isuru Films and Arosha Fernando. It stars Arjuna Kamalanath and Ameesha Kavindi in lead roles. Music composed by Keshan Perera. It is the 1194th Sri Lankan film in the Sinhala cinema.

== Cast ==
- Arjuna Kamalanath as Wickrama
- Ameesha Kavindi as Jina
- Sudath Wijesekara as Jerry
- Chami Senanayake as Rosairo
- Sapna Kareem as Rosy
- Rashmi Pushpika as Marie
- Marian Elizabeth as Jane
- Nimesha Sewwandi as Taniya
- Channa Chanaka as Chillie
