= Sansun Nosansun =

Sansun Nosansun සන්සුන් නොසන්සුන්
- Directed by: Suresh Kumarasinghe
- Written by: Suresh Kumarasinghe
- Produced by: Nethra Anjana Films
- Starring: Arjuna Kamalanath; Nilushi Halpita; Janesh Silva
- Cinematography: Ganesh Kumara
- Edited by: M. S. Aliman
- Music by: Nadeeka Guruge
- Production company: Dil Proses Lab
- Release date: 8 May 2003
- Country: Sri Lanka
- Language: Sinhala

Sansun Nosansun (Sinhala: සන්සුන් නොසන්සුන්) is a 2003 Sri Lankan Sinhala adult drama film directed by Suresh Kumarasinghe and produced by Niroshan Devapriya for Nethra Anjana Films. It stars Arjuna Kamalanath and Nilushi Helpita in lead roles along with Janesh Silva and Teddy Vidyalankara. Music composed by Nadeeka Guruge. It is the 1008th Sri Lankan film in the Sinhala cinema.

== Cast ==
- Arjuna Kamalanath
- Nilushi Helpita
- Janesh Silva
- Chathura Perera
- Teddy Vidyalankara
- Rex Kodippili
- Piyatillaka Atapattu
- Sunil Bamunuarachchi
- Chandani Silva
