= Sudu Hansi =

- Sinhala: සුදු හංසි
- Directed by: Mohamad Shaffraz
- Written by: Mohamad Shaffraz
- Based on: a novel by Gamini Wasalasuriya
- Produced by: Nimana Films
- Starring: Semini Iddamalgoda; Arjuna Kamalanath; Amisha Kavindi
- Cinematography: Pushpakuma Bandara Rajaguru
- Edited by: Pravin Jayarathne
- Music by: Navaratne Gamage
- Distributed by: CEL Theaters
- Release date: 8 January 2010
- Running time: 120 minutes
- Country: Sri Lanka
- Language: Sinhala

Sudu Hansi (Sinhala: සුදු හංසි) is a 2010 Sri Lankan Sinhala adult drama film directed by Mohamad Shaffraz and co-produced by Sisira Hewahenna and Chandrika Godakanda for Nimana Films. It stars Arjuna Kamalanath, Amisha Kavindi and Semini Iddamalgoda in lead roles along with Muthu Tharanga and Sarath Chandrasiri. Music composed by Navaratne Gamage. It is the 1133rd Sri Lankan film in the Sinhala cinema.

== Plot ==
Based on a novel written by Gamini Wasalasuriya, the film revolves around Anjana a who works as a driver in a wealthy family in the town. His employer is Mrs. Ransiri who lives with her playful daughter Maleesha and sick husband. Mrs. Ransiri falls in love with Anjana who resembles her former lover.

However Anjana has a girl friend in the village and she is Wathsala. Meanwhile Mrs. Ransiri’s daughter Maleesha too has a special interest in Anjana.

== Cast ==
- Arjuna Kamalanath as Anjana / Clifford
- Amisha Kavindi as Maleesha
- Semini Iddamalgoda as Shami Ransiri
- Neil Alles as Ransiri 'Rane'
- Sarath Chandrasiri as Shami's guard
- Muthu Tharanga as Wathsala
