= Surapurata Kanyaviyak =

Surapurata Kanyaviyak සුරපුරට කන්‍යාවීයක්
- Directed by: Mario Jayatunga
- Written by: Mario Jayatunga
- Produced by: Yasin Films
- Starring: Dilhani Ekanayake; Srinath Maddumage; Veena Jayakody
- Cinematography: Nimal Nakalanda
- Edited by: Kumarasiri de Silva
- Music by: Sarath Wickrama
- Production companies: Dil Foses, Battaramulla
- Distributed by: LFD Films
- Release date: 28 October 2002
- Country: Sri Lanka
- Language: Sinhala

Surapurata Kanyaviyak (Sinhala: සුරපුරට කන්‍යාවීයක්) is a 2002 Sri Lankan Sinhala comedy film directed by Mario Jayatunga and produced by Suren Yasin for Yasin Films. It stars Dilhani Ekanayake and Srinath Maddumage in lead roles along with Veena Jayakody and Srinath Maddumage. Music is composed by Sarath Wickrama. It is the 994th Sri Lankan film in the Sinhala cinema.

== Cast ==
- Dilhani Ekanayake
- Veena Jayakody
- Srinath Maddumage
- G.R Perera
- Sureni Senarath
- Thalatha Gunasekara
- Priyantha Wijekoon
- Ravindra Yasas
- Suresh Gamage
- Manel Wanaguru
- Manike Attanayake
- Nanda Wickramage
- Sarath Dikkumbura
- Gayana Sudarshani
