= Vishma Rathriya =

Vishma Rathriya විෂ්ම රාත්‍රිය
- Directed by: Srilal Priyadeva
- Written by: Niroshan Devapriya
- Produced by: Nethra Anjana Films
- Starring: Arjuna Kamalanath; Nilushi Halpita; Teddy Vidyalankara
- Cinematography: Dinesh Kumara
- Edited by: Srilal Priyadeva
- Music by: Sangeeth Bharatha
- Production company: Dil Proses
- Release date: 20 March 2003
- Running time: 100 minutes
- Country: Sri Lanka
- Language: Sinhala

Vishma Rathriya (Surprise Night) (Sinhala: විෂ්ම රාත්‍රිය) is a 2003 Sri Lankan Sinhala adult drama film directed by Srilal Priyadeva and produced by Niroshan Devapriya for Nethra Anjana Films. It stars Arjuna Kamalanath and Nilushi Halpita in lead roles along with Teddy Vidyalankara and Eardley Wedamuni. Music composed by Sangeeth Bharatha. It is the 1005th Sri Lankan film in the Sinhala cinema.

== Cast ==
- Arjuna Kamalanath
- Teddy Vidyalankara
- Eardley Wedamuni
- Nilushi Halpita
- Sunil Bamunuarachchi
- Thanuja Niroshini
- Kumara Ranepura
- Chathura Perera
