= Thisaravi =

Thisaravi තිසරාවි
- Directed by: Dharmashri Wickramasinghe
- Written by: Dharmashri Wickramasinghe
- Produced by: Dharmashri Wickramasinghe; Chandra Wickramasinghe
- Starring: Roger Seneviratne; Arjuna Kamalanath; Shehara Jayaweera
- Cinematography: M. H. Gafoor
- Edited by: Stanley de Alwis
- Music by: Priyanath Ratnayake
- Distributed by: Fourth Circuit
- Release date: 21 June 2000
- Country: Sri Lanka
- Language: Sinhala

Thisaravi (Sinhala: තිසරාවි) is a 2000 Sri Lankan Sinhala adult romantic film directed by Dharmashri Wickramasinghe and co-produced by director himself with Chandra Wickramasinghe. It stars Roger Seneviratne and Shehara Jayaweera in lead roles along with Arjuna Kamalanath and Senaka Wijesinghe. Music composed by Priyanath Ratnayake. It is the 937th Sri Lankan film in the Sinhala cinema.

== Cast ==
- Roger Seneviratne
- Shehara Jayaweera as Mekhala
- Arjuna Kamalanath
- Igneshes Gunarathna
- Deepani Silva
- Jayantha Ranawaka
- Senaka Wijesinghe
- Sandeepa Sewmini
- Saman Hemarathna
- Susila Kuragama
- Anne Kumari
- Wimal Wicramaarachchi
- Rathna Lanka Abeywickrama
- Deepani Madushika
- Vindya Madushani
- Eddy Amarasinghe
