= Mr Dana Rina =

Mister Dana Rina
- Directed by: Roy de Silva
- Written by: Roy de Silva
- Produced by: Roy de Silva
- Starring: Arjuna Kamalanath; Sangeetha Weeraratne; Roshan Pilapitiya
- Cinematography: G. Nandasena
- Edited by: Elmo Halliday
- Music by: Sangeeth Wickramasinghe
- Distributed by: NFC Films
- Release date: 23 February 2007
- Running time: 150 minutes
- Country: Sri Lanka
- Language: Sinhala

Mister Dana Rina (Sinhala: මිස්ට ධන රින) is a 2007 Sri Lankan Sinhala comedy film directed and produced by Roy de Silva. It stars Arjuna Kamalanath and Sangeetha Weeraratne in lead roles along with Roshan Pilapitiya and Anarkali Akarsha. Music composed by Sangeeth Wickramasinghe. It is the 1083rd Sri Lankan film in the Sinhala cinema. The film was released on 28 March 2010 in Chitra cinema, Kalutara.

== Cast ==
- Arjuna Kamalanath as Micheal
- Sangeetha Weeraratne
- Roshan Pilapitiya as Roshan
- Anusha Damayanthi as Rita
- Anarkali Akarsha
- Sumana Amarasinghe
- Priyantha Seneviratne
- Ananda Wickramage
- Rajitha Hiran
- Sunil Hettiarachchi
- Teddy Vidyalankara
- Tyrone Michael
