= Left Right Sir =

Left Right Sir ලෙෆ්ට් රයිට් සර්
- Directed by: Bandu Samarasinghe
- Written by: Bandu Samarasinghe; Lal Pagodaarchchi
- Based on: Lal Pagodaarchchi
- Produced by: NFC Films
- Starring: Bandu Samarasinghe; Nilanthi Dias; Vijaya Nandasiri
- Cinematography: M. H. Gafoor
- Edited by: M. S. Aliman
- Music by: Sarath de Alwis
- Production companies: Prasad Color Lab; Sarasavi Lab
- Release date: 21 August 2004
- Country: Sri Lanka
- Language: Sinhala

Left Right Sir (Sinhala: ලෙෆ්ට් රයිට් සර්) is a 2004 Sri Lankan Sinhala comedy action film directed by Bandu Samarasinghe and produced by National Film Corporation. It stars Bandu Samarasinghe and Nilanthi Dias in lead roles along with Neil Alles, and Vijaya Nandasiri. Music composed by Sarath de Alwis. It is the 1035th Sri Lankan film in the Sinhala cinema.

== Cast ==
- Bandu Samarasinghe as Sudha
- Nilanthi Dias as Madhu
- Neil Alles as Saradiel 'Mudalali'
- Vijaya Nandasiri as Pinto
- Sanoja Bibile as Mary
- Susil Perera as Piyasoma
- Sando Harris as Ronnie
- Susila Kottage as Madhulawathi
- Tyrone Michael as Siripala
- Rahal Bulathsinhala as Steven Cooray
- Teddy Vidyalankara as Jimmy
- Arjuna Kamalanath

== Soundtrack ==
No.	Title	Singer(s)	Length
1.	"Wennati Oba Edath Pemwathi"	Greshan Ananda, Uresha Ravihari
2.	"Adara Wassak"	Greshan Ananda, Uresha Ravihari
3.	"Pemkala Chamara Sala Sala"	Greshan Ananda, Uresha Ravihari
