= Numba Nadan Apita Pissu =

Numba Nadan Apata Pissu නුඹ නාඩන් අපිට පිස්සු
- Directed by: Milton Jayawardena
- Written by: Milton Jayawardena
- Produced by: Sunil Aruna Weerasiri
- Starring: Bandu Samarasinghe; Sasanthi Jayasekara; Ravindra Yasas
- Cinematography: M. H. Gafoor
- Edited by: M. S. Aliman
- Music by: Somapala Rathnayake
- Production companies: Prasad Color Lab; Sarasavi Lab
- Release date: 8 March 2003
- Country: Sri Lanka
- Language: Sinhala

Numba Nadan Apata Pissu (Sinhala: නුඹ නාඩන් අපිට පිස්සු) is a 2003 Sri Lankan Sinhala comedy action film directed by Milton Jayawardena and produced by Sunil Aruna Weerasiri. It stars Bandu Samarasinghe and Sasanthi Jayasekara in lead roles along with Ravindra Yasas, and Ananda Wickramage. Music composed by Somapala Rathnayake. It is the 1007th Sri Lankan film in the Sinhala cinema.

== Cast ==
- Bandu Samarasinghe as Samsung Almeida 'Baby Talky' / Mr. Almeida 'Loku Hamu'
- Sasanthi Jayasekara as Sepalika Malwanna
- Ravindra Yasas as Diesel
- Ananda Wickramage as 'Sakaladosha Dhuribhootha' Gurunnanse
- Anton Jude as PC Walbanda
- Wasantha Wittachchi as Weera
- Rajitha Hiran as Patiya
- Ronnie Leitch as Mister Balthazar
- Janesh Silva as 'Avathewa' Balky Talky's servant
- Arjuna Kamalanath as Mahesh Damunupola guest appearance, Sepalika's Lover
- Sanet Dikkumbura as 'Sathya Prema Brunga Raj' Music Master
- Ariyasena Gamage as Tamil Sergeant
- Srinath Maddumage as Army husband
- Manel Wanaguru as Sepalika's mother
- Felician Fernando as Dancer
- Ashain Fernando as Dancer

== Soundtrack ==
No.	Title	Singer(s)	Length
1.	"Wennati Oba Edath Pemwathi"	Gratien Ananda, Uresha Ravihari
2.	"Adara Wassak"	Gratien Ananda, Uresha Ravihari
3.	"Pemkala Chamara Sala Sala"	Gratien Ananda, Uresha Ravihari
