= Ali Patiyo Oyai Mamai =

- DVD poster
- Sinhala: අලි පැටියෝ ඔයයි
- Directed by: Srilal Priyadeva
- Written by: Srilal Priyadeva
- Based on: Lalindra Wijewickrama
- Produced by: M.G.L Films
- Starring: Jananjaya Lakmal; Bimal Jayakody; Ananda Wickramage; Bandu Samarasinghe
- Cinematography: Lalith M. Thomas
- Edited by: B. S. R. Pratap; Siddartha Nayanananda
- Music by: Edward Jayakody
- Production companies: Dil Process Studio; Dil Films International
- Distributed by: CEL Theaters
- Release date: 24 August 2006
- Country: Sri Lanka
- Language: Sinhala

Ali Patiyo Oyai Mamai (Sinhala: අලි පැටියෝ ඔයයි) is a 2006 Sri Lankan Sinhala children family film directed by Srilal Priyadeva and co-produced by Lalindra Wijewickrama, N. Udaya Kumar, P. Arooran and Ravi Fernando for M.G.L Films. It stars child actor Jananjaya Lakmal with Bimal Jayakody, Ananda Wickramage, and Bandu Samarasinghe in lead roles along with Teddy Vidyalankara, and Eardley Wedamuni. Music composed by renowned musician Edward Jayakody. The film earned Rs. 9 million collection from the first 17 days of screening.

== Cast ==
- Jananjaya Lakmal as Chaman
- Bimal Jayakody as Chaman's father Veterinary surgeon Viraj
- Ananda Wickramage as Thief Suminda
- Bandu Samarasinghe as Thief Chaminda
- Vathika Ravinath as Suraj
- Prashani Perera as Chamari
- Teddy Vidyalankara as Vedda
- Eardley Wedamuni as Ranger
- Anura Bandara Rajaguru as Bandila Aththo
- Ranjani Rajmohan as Lechchami

== Soundtrack ==
No.	Title	Lyrics	Singer(s)	Length
1.	"Ali Patiyo Oyai Mamai"	Rev. Rambukkana Siddhartha Thero	Ravindu Pasanjaya
