= Jolly Hallo =

2001 film by Srilal Priyadeva

Jolly Hallo ජොලි හලෝ
- Directed by: Srilal Priyadeva
- Written by: Srilal Priyadeva
- Based on: Srilal Priyadeva
- Produced by: Nimalaweera Films
- Starring: Bandu Samarasinghe; Nilanthi Dias; Freddie Silva; Arjuna Kamalanath
- Cinematography: M. H. Gafoor
- Edited by: Srilal Priyadeva
- Music by: Mervyn Priyantha
- Production companies: Prasad Color Lab; Sarasavi Lab
- Release date: 6 September 2001
- Running time: 120 minutes
- Country: Sri Lanka
- Language: Sinhala

Jolly Hallo (Sinhala: ජොලි හලෝ) is a 2001 Sri Lankan Sinhala comedy action film directed by Srilal Priyadeva and produced by Nimal Weerakkody for Nimalaweera Films. It stars Bandu Samarasinghe and Nilanthi Dias in lead roles along with Freddie Silva, Arjuna Kamalanath and Ananda Wickramage. Music composed by Mervyn Priyantha. It is the 963rd Sri Lankan film in the Sinhala cinema. The film won the Sarasaviya Award for the Most Popular Film of The Year 2001 and Bandu Samarasinghe won the Sarasaviya Award for the creative performance.

== Cast ==
- Bandu Samarasinghe as Brando
- Nilanthi Dias as Thushara
- Freddie Silva as Brando's Father
- Ananda Wickramage as Veterinary doctor
- Arjuna Kamalanath as Jonny
- Manel Wanaguru as Brando's mother
- Srinath Maddumage as Threewheel driver
- Teddy Vidyalankara as Kapila aka Maramus
- Eardley Wedamuni as Malan
- Hemantha Iriyagama as dog owner
- Sathish Perera as Jonny's friend

== Soundtrack ==
No.	Title	Lyrics	Singer(s)	Length
1.	"Dunna Wadai Kidai"	Chandradasa Fernando	Pratap Rajitha, Susil Fernando, Menik Chandrika
2.	"Deviyani Ai Ane"	Chandradasa Fernando	Nuwan Gunawardana
