= Underworld (2004 film) =

Underworld අන්ඩර්ව්ල්ඩ්
- Directed by: Sudesh Wasantha Pieris
- Written by: Karunaratne Hettiarachchi
- Produced by: Mission Hearts Films
- Starring: Arjuna Kamalanath; Nilanthi Dias; Wasantha Kumaravila
- Cinematography: Lalith M. Thomas
- Edited by: Kumarasiri de Silva
- Music by: Achala Soloman
- Production company: Dil Process Lab
- Distributed by: Ridma Circuit
- Release date: 19 November 2004
- Country: Sri Lanka
- Language: Sinhala

Underworld (Sinhala: අන්ඩර්ව්ල්ඩ්) is a 2004 Sri Lankan Sinhala action thriller film directed by Sudesh Wasantha Pieris and produced by Mission Hearts Films. It stars Arjuna Kamalanath and Nilanthi Dias in lead roles along with Wasantha Kumaravila and Rex Kodippili. Music composed by Achala Soloman. It is the 1043rdh Sri Lankan film in the Sinhala cinema.

== Cast ==
- Arjuna Kamalanath as Mahesh
- Nilanthi Dias as Imali
- Wasantha Kumaravila as Suraj
- Rex Kodippili
- Cletus Mendis
- Robin Fernando
- Dayaratne Siriwardena
- Melani Ashoka
- Sapna Kareem
