= Miyuri Samarasinghe =

Sri Lankan actress (1939–2021)

Miyuri Samarasinghe මියුරි සමරසිංහ
- Born: Wijeratne Miyuri Samarasinghe; March 15, 1939; Moratuwa, Sri Lanka
- Died: February 6, 2021 (aged 81); Colombo, Sri Lanka
- Education: Musaeus College
- Occupations: Actress, Dancer, Producer, Director
- Years active: 1965–2017
- Spouse: Piyal Samarasinghe (m. 1956)
- Children: 4

Wijeratne Miyuri Samarasinghe (15 March 1939 – 6 February 2021: as Sinhala: මියුරි සමරසිංහ), popularly known as Miyuri Samarasinghe, was an actress in Sri Lankan cinema, theater and television. Apart from acting, she also worked as a dancer, scriptwriter, producer and director. She was serving as the president of Sudarshi Institute.

== Personal life ==
She was born on 15 March 1939 in Moratuwa. She first attended Holy Rosary Catholic School, Moratuwa and then went to Musaeus College. At the age of 14, she was able to perform upcountry and low country dances under the guidance of Jayantha Algama. Therefore, she was selected to perform the middle and end dances of the monthly radio show.

She worked for the Sinhala Cultural Institute (Sudarsi) as a teacher, holding various positions.

She married at the age of 17 and by the age of 24, she was a mother of four children. She met her husband Piyal Samarasinghe during school days. The couple has three daughters - Sujeewa, Deepthi, Awanthi - and one son, Ruwan. Deepthi and Awanthi are twins. Her husband Piyal died in 1979, when she was 39 years old.

She died on 6 February 2021 at the age of 81 after a prolonged battle with cancer.

== Acting career ==
While still in school, she entered the Radio Ceylon and later went on to various radio programs with musician M. K. Rocksamy. She became a permanent member of the Maasika Reguma program. Meanwhile, she attended to radio drama screen test conducted by Dharma Sri Wickramasinghe and became one of the top five scorers. At that time, she joined other young artists in the radio such as Geetha Kanthi Jayakody and Niranjala Sarojini for programs such as Baloli Loli Loli. Although she moved away from art with her marriage, she later joined Mercy Edirisinghe for Welikala Ratna's stage play Aluth Dawasak.

Then she received many opportunities for acting in stage plays such as Ran Kanda, Umathusan Warusawa, Bammanno, Uruvisi, Hitha Honda Ammandi, Nattukkarayo, Nekatha, Othello, Sivamma Dhanapala, Lora and Nawasiya Anu Nawaya. She has acted in over 300 stage plays and produced and directed 10 plays. In 1981, she won the Award for Best Actress at Presidential Festival for the play Nawasiya Anu Nawaya. At the same year, her production Hima Kurullo received four awards at the Golden Design Awards for Best Actor, Actress, Script and Production. In 1983, she wrote and directed the short drama Loka Dekak Athara, where she won the Best actress award. Then she directed the play ''Parasakwala Peyak. It also won awards for the Best Actress and Best Production. She has appeared in over 300 different stage plays such as: Hita Honda ammaṇḍi, Pārā, Dēśapāluvā, Otelō, Næṭṭukkārayō, and Nækatha.

While she was still active on stage, she made her film debut with the film Baduth Ekka Horu with a minor role. Her first major role in films came through 1973 film Miringuwa directed by Amarasena Kumarasinghe. Since then, she has acted in many films under renowned filmmakers, including Podi Vijay, Adhishtanaya, Ridee Thella, Madol Duwa, Viragaya, Yahalu Yeheli and Adara Hasuna.

She entered television dramas with the New Year teledrama Erabadu Mal directed by Bandula Vithanage. After that she appeared in many motherly roles in over 500 tele serials such as Irata Handana Mal, Ira Paya, Ganga saha Nissanka, Sannaliyane, Nedeyo, Sihina Nimnaya, Sura Asura, Damini, Passe Gena Manamali and Sudo Sudu. She was also awarded the actress who acted in the most teledramas. She won Presidential Awards for Best Performance in 1976 and then Best Actress Award for drama Kemmura in 2002.

A concert Miyuri Samarasinghe Rangabhinandana organized by the Department of Culture and the Tower Hall Theater Foundation to pay tribute to her was held at the Maradana Tower Hall Theater on 4 October 2015. As she passed the 50th anniversary of her drama career, she wrote her life story and published a book titled Kala Lowe Mama Ipadunemi.

She has directed and produced nine stage dramas - Loka Dekak Athara, Parasakwala Peyak, Ammai Puthai, Hima Kurullo, Paara, Anna Karonina, Sapatheru Hamine, Abarthuwak, Miyuri Rangamala - and produced one play Muthu Aete. She was awarded the honorary title of Maanava Hithavadee Keerthi Sri Veeraputra Deshabandu in June, 2019 for the service towards drama in Sri Lanka.

=== Selected Television series ===
- Amarapuraya
- Damini
- Doo Daruwo
- Ganga Saha Nishshanka
- Giraya
- Hiruta Pipena Suriyakantha
- Irata Handana Mal
- Malsara Akunu
- Niranandaya
- Passe Gena Manamali
- Sansara Sakmana
- Sihina Nimnaya
- Sura Asura

== Filmography ==
Year	Film	Role	Ref.
1969	Baduth Ekka Horu	Beach layer	
1972	Sithijaya		
1976	Madol Duwa	Upali's mother	
1976	Vanarayo		
1977	Eya Dan Loku Lamayek	School trip teacher	
1978	Madhuwanthi		
1978	Saara		
1978	Anupama	Louie's wife	
1979	Samanmali		
1979	Nuwan Renu	Mrs. Perera	
1979	Visihathara Peya		
1981	Ridee Thella		
1982	Yasa Isuru	Suraj and Suramya's aunt	
1982	Adhistana		
1982	Yahalu Yeheli	Karunawathie	
1983	Sumithuro	Harassed woman	
1983	Siw Ranga Sena		
1983	Sister Mary	Church servant	
1984	Wadula	Gatambi	
1984	Muthu Menike		
1984	Walle Thanu Maliga	Cyril's mother	
1984	Veera Madduma Bandara	Second Queen	
1985	Yuganthaya		
1986	Gimhane Gee Naade	Aunty	
1986	Avurudu Da		
1986	Aadara Hasuna		
1987	Yugayen Yugayata		
1987	Podi Vijay		
1987	Mangala Thegga	Mrs. Fernando	
1987	Viragaya	Gunawathie	
1990	Pem Raja Dahana		
1991	Keli Madala	Gunawathie	
1992	Sinha Raja		
1992	Umayangana		
1992	Salli Thibunata Madi		
1993	Nelum Saha Samanmali		
1994	Pawana Ralu Viya		
1994	Handana Kinkini		
1994	Yuwathipathi	Janaraja's mother	
1995	Maruthaya	Dharme's associate's wife	
1995	Ayoma		
1996	Obatai Me Aradhana		
1996	Sihina Deshayen		
1996	Hitha Hondanam Waradin Na		
1996	Bawa Sasara		
1997	Bawa Duka	Peduru's mother	
1997	Bawa Karma		
1998	Anthima Reya		
1999	Salupata Ahasata		
1999	Sathyadevi	Aggie	
2000	Salupata Ahasata 2		
2001	Jack and Jill		
2002	Kamasuthra	Nelum's mother	
2002	Rosa Patikki		
2003	Sonduru Dadabima	Kamal's mother	
2003	Bheeshanaye Athuru Kathawak	Sopina	
2003	Sudu Salu	Amara's mother	
2005	Samantha		
2005	Alu Yata Gini		
2006	Samunoganna Sugandhika		
2006	Bherunda Pakshiya		
2008	Rosa Diganthe		
2012	Vijaya Kuweni		
2013	Ira Laga Wadi		
2015	Aathma Warusha		
2016	Paththini	Villager	
2017	Hima Tharaka		
2017	Sellam Nethnam Lellam		
TBD	Back to School		
