= Srinath Maddumage =

Sri Lankan actor

Srinath Maddumage ශ්‍රීනාත් මද්දුමගේ
- Born: 16 October 1963 (age 63); Moratuwa, Sri Lanka
- Education: Prince of Wales' College, Moratuwa
- Occupations: Actor, Director, Announcer
- Years active: 1995–present
- Spouse: Sriyani Jayawickrema
- Children: Minuri Maddumage

Srinath Mahesh Maddumage as ශ්‍රීනාත් මද්දුමගේ) [Sinhala]), (born 16 October 1963) is an actor in Sri Lankan cinema, stage drama, and television. Maddumage is known for their roles in the films Diya Yata Gindara, Sonduru Dadabima, and Kosthapal Punyasoma.

== Personal life ==
Maddumage was born on 16 October 1963 in Moratuwa, Sri Lanka. past pupil of Prince of Wales' College, Moratuwa. While in school, he started acting under Gurudeva Tissa Gunawardena. During that time, he played the title role in stage play Pandukabhaya directed by Simon Navagattegama. Maddumage has an external degree and diploma in Journalism from the University of Sri Jayewardenepura.

He is married to Sriyani Jayawickrema, who is a PhD graduate in Water Management. the couple currently live in Epping, Victoria, Australia. They have one daughter, Menuri Chamathka.

== Acting career ==
After secondary education, Maddumage studied theater and drama under teachers like Solamon Fonseka and Rudi Corrence. His maiden stage drama acting came through Monarawilak. He has acted in many teledramas directed by Nalan Mendis including Nedeyo, Sathpura Wasiyo and Sooriya Daruwo. He acted in stage drama Padhada Asapuwa by Sriyantha Mendis which got the opportunity to travel to 13 countries in Europe for staging the drama. Then in 1984, he acted in first television serial, Kathandara Pituwa and then in Watamaluwa. In 1985, he won a merit award at the Youth Award Festival for the role in play Vikalpa Samayama. He won the award for the Best Supporting Actor for his role in serial Depath Nai at Sumathi Awards.

Maddumage started his film career with Ayoma back in 1995, directed by Parakrama Niriella with a minor role. In 1999, he was nominated for the award for Best Upcoming Actor at Sarasaviya Awards for the role in film Gini Avi Saha Gini Keli.

=== Notable television works ===
- Bonikko
- Daruwange Ammala
- Depath Nai
- Duvili Maliga
- Kotipathiyo
- Ingammaruwa
- Itu Devi Vimana
- Kaha Ira Pamula
- Keetaya 5
- Kulawanthayo
- Mathaka Sulanga
- Maya Mansala
- Mihimadala Giniganie
- Nedeyo
- Punchi Weerayo
- Sandagira
- Salli Pokuru
- Sathpura Wasiyo
- Senehewanthayo
- Sooriya Daruwo
- Suba Saha yasa
- Surya Vinsathi
- Visi Ekwana Horawa
- Wansakkarayo

=== Notable theater works ===
- Padhada Asapuwa
- Suba Saha Yasa
- Ashawe Veedi
- Warrantuwa
- Nissabdha Venu

== Beyond acting ==
He worked in Peter Maccallum Cancer Hospital in Melbourne. Also he is a story teller for Sri Lankan children which is attached to 'Hume library' in Melbourne. He started a monthly newspaper with 40 pages named Sannasa along with another Sri Lankan Jagath J. Edirisinghe. In television, he presented the programs Rhythm Chat, Gee Hatha. He performed in the visual for song Sanda Sakki Kiyapu Den by Nirosha Virajini. He is also an active member of Alcoholic and Drug Prevention Society. In 2018, he produced the stage drama Hadannama Ba.

He is very popular for conducting muppet shows such as Rusara Vindana, Kele Kade, Sudu Pancha, Hichchi Pinchi (Ran Pancha) and Panchai Pinchei for channels like Rupavahini, ITN, Swarnawahini. In 1998, he won awards at the Asian Muppet Festival held at Seoul, Korea.

He also worked as a Video Production co-ordinator at Alcohol & Drug Information Center (ADDICT).

== Filmography ==
Year	Film	Role	Ref.
1995	Ayoma		
1997	Mahameara Usata		
1998	Gini Avi Saha Gini Keli	Rambo	
1999	Bahu Bharya		
2000	Pem Kekula		
2000	Salupata Ahasata		
2001	Kanyaviyakage Raththriya		
2001	Jolly Hallo	Threewheel driver	
2002	Surapurata Kanyaviyak		
2002	Jolly Hallo 2		
2002	Bahubuthayo	Sakkara Gune	
2003	Sonduru Dadabima	Lieutenant Jayasuriya	
2003	Numba Nadan Apita Pissu	Army husband	
2004	Diya Yata Gindara	Herath	
2005	One Shot	Wickie	
2007	Ran Kevita	Vilba	
2014	Kosthapal Punyasoma	Anton	
2014	Siri Daladagamanaya	Relic thrasher	
2016	Adaraneeya Kathawak	Cameo role	
2018	Wassanaye Sanda	Thusith	
2022	Gindari 2	God	
TBD	King Dutugemunu		

== Awards and accolades ==
He has won several awards at the local stage drama festivals and television festivals.

=== Sumathi Awards ===
Year	Nominee / work	Award	Result
1995	Depath Nai	Best Supporting Actor	Won

=== State Drama Festival ===
Year	Nominee / work	Award	Result
1985	Warenthuwa	Best Supporting Actor	Won
