= Sonduru Wasanthe =

Sonduru Wasanthe සොඳුරු වසන්තේ
- Directed by: Roy de Silva
- Written by: Roy de Silva; K. D. Nicholas
- Produced by: Ajanee Films
- Starring: Tharindu Wijesinghe; Chathurika Peiris; Anarkali Akarsha
- Cinematography: G. Nandasena
- Edited by: Elmo Halliday
- Music by: Sangeeth Wickramasinghe
- Distributed by: CEL Theatres
- Release date: 6 July 2006
- Country: Sri Lanka
- Language: Sinhala

Sonduru Wasanthe (The Lovely Spring) (Sinhala: සොඳුරු වසන්තේ) is a 2006 Sri Lankan Sinhala romantic drama film directed by Roy de Silva and produced by Ajanee Rita Perera for Ajanee Films. It stars newcomer Tharindu Wijesinghe, with Chathurika Peiris and Anarkali Akarsha in lead roles along with Arjuna Kamalanath, and Anusha Damayanthi. Music composed by Sangeeth Wickramasinghe. It is the 1075th Sri Lankan film in the Sinhala cinema.

== Cast ==
- Tharindu Wijesinghe as Malinga
- Chathurika Peiris as Harshi
- Anarkali Akarsha as Anju
- Niroshan Wijesinghe as Roshan
- Arjuna Kamalanath as Mahinda
- Anusha Damayanthi as Renuka
- Nilanthi Dias as Nisha
- Mahinda Pathirage as Amadoru
- Himali Siriwardena as Kamala
- Roy de Silva as Jayawardena
- Teddy Vidyalankara as Thug
- Lahiru Mudalige as Mahesh
