= Sunil Hettiarachchi =

Comedian and character actor

- Born: Sunil Edmund Hettiarachchi; April 8, 1937
- Died: 3 December 2015 (aged 78); Maradana, Colombo
- Education: Christian School, Kotte
- Occupation: Actor
- Years active: 1982–2008
- Known for: Famous Comedy Actor
- Notable work: Bodima, Keetaya
- Children: Asha Hettiarachchi

Sunil Edmund Hettiarachchi (8 April 1937 – 3 December 2015) was a well-known Sri Lankan comedian and character actor known for his bald appearance with a full beard and skinny frame.

== Career ==
Hettiarachchi began his film career in 1982 playing a servant in Kadawunu Poronduwa. He began to gain fame with his comic roles in low budget genre films in the late-80s and 90s which emphasized his comical look.

Despite primarily playing comedic roles, Hettiarachchi has appeared in several art films in small character roles. In 1987, he played a small role in Tissa Abeysekera's Viragaya. In 1992, he had a role in Kulageya. In 1994, he played a comic character in Mee Haraka and in 2001 in Me Mage Sandai.

He has also acted in international productions filmed in Sri Lanka like The Second Jungle Book: Mowgli & Baloo and Mother Teresa: In the Name of God's Poor (both 1997).

== Notable teledramas ==
- Alli and Galli
- Bodima
- Charitha Dekak
- Dedunu Yanaya
- Giju
- Giraya
- Hiru Thanivela
- Hotel D'Kalabala
- Kasee Salu
- Keetaya 1, 2, 3, 4
- Kethumathi
- Kopi Kade
- Lahiru Dahasak
- Mahagedara
- Mayavi
- Nadeeladiya
- Niwataya
- Palingu Menike
- Raja Bhavana
- Raththarana Neth
- Sathyangana
- Sayaweni Patumaga
- Shoba
- Suddilage Kathawa
- Suwanda Yahaluwo
- Sura Pura Sara

== Filmography ==
- No. denotes the Number of Sri Lankan films in the Sri Lankan cinema.

Year	No.	Film	Role
1982	541	Kadawunu Poronduwa remake	Simio
1984	590	Hithawathiya	Cyril
1987	654	Hitha Honda Chandiya	Sudda
1987	664	Nommara Ekai	
1987	667	Viragaya	Beggar
1988	678	Nawa Gilunath Banchun	Match maker
1988	679	Durga	
1988	683	Sagara Jalaya Madi Haduwa Oba Sanda	Heeni patikkiya
1990	698	Thanha Asha	
1990	704	Hodin Naththam Narakin	
1990	708	Jaya Kothanda	
1990	711	Chandi Raja	
1990	716	Wana Bambara	
1991	723	Obata Pamanai Adare	
1991	724	Hithata Dukak Nathi Miniha	
1991	729	Esala Sanda	
1991	737	Sthree	
1992	742	Ranabime Veeraya	
1992	746	Raja Daruwo	Marathelis
1992	747	Bajar Eke Chandiya	
1992	761	Kulageya	Street vendor
1993	774	Prathingya	Ogaa
1993	775	Wali Sulanga	
1993	780	Come Or Go Chicago	Mason
1994	796	Ekada Wahi	
1994	806	Pawana Ralu Wiya	
1994	819	Mee Haraka	Barber
1995	821	Wasana Wewa	Gunapala
1995	828	Deviyani Sathya Surakinna	Prison visitor
1995	830	Demodara Palama	Kavikola Karaya
1995	833	Chandiyage Putha	Chuti's father
1995	839	Cheriyo Captain	Tarzan
1996	844	Sathi	
1996	849	Naralowa Holman	Franklin 'Sala' Salgadu
1996	852	Veediye Veeraya	
1996	853	Hitha Hondanam Waradin Na	
1996	855	Sabe Mithuro	
1996	857	Hitha Honda Gahaniyak	
1996	860	Loku Duwa	
1997	English	The Second Jungle Book: Mowgli & Baloo	Rickshaw driver
1997	881	Apaye Thathpara 84000k	
1997	English	Mother Teresa: In the Name of God's Poor	Slum dweller
1997	883	Pem Mal Mala	Andawansa
1998	891	Aya Obata Barai	Julius
1998	892	Yuda Gini Mada	
1998	902	Julietge Bhumikawa	
1999	919	Kolompoor	I.Opatha. also as playback singer
1999	924	Seetha Samire	also as playback singer.
2001	946	Hai Baby Hai	
2001	956	Hai Hui Babi Achchi	Pussali
2001	959	Jonsun and Gonsun	Avathewa
2001	961	Me Mage Sandai	
2001	965	Dinuma Kageda	
2002	991	Love 2002	Jerry
2002	995	Somy Boys	WWW Sugathapala
2003	1002	Vala In London	Vala's father
2003	1004	Aladinge Waldin	Guliver
2003	1010	Taxi Driver	
2003	1022	Hitha Honda Pisso	Vinnie
2004	1037	Ohoma Harida	Weerasinghe mudalali
2004	1026	Clean Out	Rosalyn's father
2004	1034	Salamuthu Pinna	
2006	1065	Supiri Balawatha	
2006	1074	Rana Hansi	
2007	1083	Mister Dhana Rina	
2007	1085	Weda Beri Tarzan	Silva
2007	1086	Sankranthi	
2007	1091	Hai Master	Arachchila servant
2008	1114	Machan	Amos
2007	1115	Ai Oba Thaniwela	
2010	1137	Mago Digo Dai	Premaratne
2010		Kawulu Dora	
