= Sepata Dukata Sunny =

Sepata Dukata Sunny සැපට දුකට සනී
- Directed by: Roy de Silva
- Written by: Roy de Silva
- Starring: Bandu Samarasinghe; Sangeetha Weeraratne; James Lewis; Cletus Mendis; Sriyani Amarasena
- Music by: Somapala Rathnayake
- Release date: 28 March 2003
- Country: Sri Lanka
- Language: Sinhala

Sepata Dukata Sunny (Sinhala: සැපට දුකට සනී) is a 2003 Sri Lankan Sinhala comedy, family film directed by Roy de Silva. It stars Bandu Samarasinghe in lead role along with Sangeetha Weeraratne, Cletus Mendis and Sriyani Amarasena. Music for the film is done by Somapala Rathnayake. It is the 1006th Sri Lankan film in the Sinhala cinema.

== Cast ==
- Bandu Samarasinghe as Ambewela Mudiyanselage Don Sunny
- James Lewis as young Bond at the station
- Sangeetha Weeraratne as Sempamutti Arachchige Tara Kumarihami
- Cletus Mendis as Tara's brother
- Sriyani Amarasena as Silawathi, Sunny's mother
- Ruwanthi Mangala as Mala
- Nilanthi Dias as Geetha
- Nirosha Herath as Seetha
- Rajitha Hiran as Tarzan
- Mangala Premaratne as Sattan
- Ananda Wickramage as Station master
- Teddy Vidyalankara as Henchman
- Jayantha Bopearachchi as Post Office master
- Ronnie Leitch as Charlie, Geetha's brother
- Susil Perera as Seetha's brother
- Mabel Blythe as Mala's mother
- Upali Keerthisena as Lawyer
