= Ravindra Yasas =

Sri Lankan actor

Ravindra Yasas රවීන්ද්‍ර යසස්
- Born: Kumanayakage Ravindra Yasas; 20 April 1964 (age 62); Matara, Sri Lanka
- Occupations: Actor, Singer, Politician, Dramatist
- Years active: 1984–present
- Political party: Samagi Jana Balawegaya
- Spouse: Kokilani Benaragama
- Children: Kasun Chamara
- Relatives: Jagath Benaragama (brother-in-law)

Kumanayakage Ravindra Yasas (born 20 April 1964 රවීන්ද්‍ර යසස් [Sinhala]) is an actor in Sri Lankan cinema, theater and television as well as a singer and a radio host. Highly versatile actor mostly engaged in theater and television, he is currently serving as a Western Provincial Councilor.

== Personal life ==
Yasas is married to theater director Kokilani Benaragama. The couple has one son, Kasun Chamara is also a renowned actor and singer, who started career with musical program Hapan Padura. Chamara acted with father in few films such as Jim Pappa and Pin Pon. Kokilani is the sister of popular actor Jagath Benaragama.

== Career ==
In 1984, he started his stage drama career with the popular play Abuddassa Kolama. Then he acted in the stage drama Raja Kapuru. His song Suwanda Saban Aga Gala in the play was highly popularized. He started cinema career with the 1995 film Ayoma directed by Parakrama Niriella. Then he acted in many comedy roles in films including Hai Baby Hai, Pissu Puso, Jim Pappa and Kosthapal Punyasoma. In 1999, he won Sumathi Merit Award for the role in Avul Haraya teledrama.

He has portrayed in many political satires on television such as And Company by singing ‘Virindu’, making a mockery of current social and political issues. He has released a music album titled Anda Manda Virindu.

=== Selected stage dramas ===
- Abuddassa Kolama
- Deyyoth Danne Ne
- Handa Nihanda
- Hora Police
- Meeyo Nathuwa Be
- Raja Kapuru

=== Selected television serials ===
- Ada Sihinaya
- And Company
- Apuru Sahodaraya
- Avul Haraya
- Dala Rala Pela
- Damsaari
- Hatara Kenderaya
- Kota Uda Mandira
- Mehew Rate
- Pata Veeduru
- Samudra Chaya
- Sathara Ima Gini
- Sidu
- Sikuru Wasanthe
- Visula Ahasa Yata
- Yaso Mandira

== Political career ==
His first involvement in politics was around 1990s as a JVP activist In 2014, he contested for Western Province in provincial council election under Democratic Party led by Sarath Fonseka from Kalutara District. Currently he contest under Samagi Jana Balawegaya leb by Sajith Premadasa.

== Accident ==
on 28 January 2019 Kumanayake admitted with minor injuries to the Horana Base Hospital for treatment after his car crashed into a tree at Gammanpila in Bandaragama on the Kesbewa Road. The accident happened at about 4:45 am while he was on his way home after attending for a radio program.

== Filmography ==
Year	Film	Roles	Ref.
1995	Ayoma		
1997	Bawa Duka	Purampiya	
1998	Gini Avi Saha Gini Keli	Willie's lookout	
1999	Theertha Yathra	Dharmadasa	
2000	Kauda Bole Alice	Siri Ayya	
2000	Anuragaye Ananthaya	Rape claim supporter	
2001	Oba Magema Wewa		
2001	Sellam Kukka		
2001	Hai Baby Hai		
2001	Daru Upatha		
2001	Pissu Puso	Dougie's friend	
2002	Surapurata Kanyaviyak		
2003	Pin Pon	Francis	
2003	Jim Pappa		
2003	Numba Nadan Apita Pissu	Diesel	
2014	Kosthapal Punyasoma	Anton's henchman	
2015	Gindari	Secretary Ari	
2017	Bandhanaya	Wimalasiri	
2019	President Super Star	multiple roles	
TBA	Kalpana †		
