= Rosa Diganthe =

Rosa Diganthe රෝස දිගන්තේ
- Directed by: Suresh Kumarasinghe
- Written by: Suresh Kumarasinghe
- Produced by: Nashon Films
- Starring: Nilanthi Dias; PrTharindu Wijesinghe; Manjula Thilini
- Cinematography: Yapa Vijaya Bandara
- Edited by: Kumarasiri de Silva
- Music by: Asela Indralal
- Release date: 19 February 2008
- Country: Sri Lanka
- Language: Sinhala

Rosa Diganthe (Sinhala: රෝස දිගන්තේ) is a 2008 Sri Lankan Sinhala comedy film directed by Suresh Kumarasinghe and produced by Bertrum Jayakody for Nashon Films. It stars Nilanthi Dias and Tharindu Wijesinghe in lead roles along with Manjula Thilini and Rex Kodippili. Music composed by Asela Indralal. It is the 1113rd Sri Lankan film in the Sinhala cinema.

== Cast ==
- Nilanthi Dias
- Manjula Thilini
- Rex Kodippili
- Tharindu Wijesinghe
- Dayananda Jayawardena
- Premadasa Vithanage
- Teddy Vidyalankara
- Tyrone Michael
- Miyuri Samarasinghe
