= Sir Last Chance =

2009 Sri Lankan comedy film

Sir Last Chance සර් ලාස්ට් චාන්ස්
- title card
- Directed by: Roy de Silva
- Written by: Roy de Silva
- Produced by: EAP Films
- Starring: Vijaya Nandasiri; Sanath Wimalasiri; Lucky Dias
- Cinematography: Pushpakumara Bandara Rajaguru
- Edited by: Praveen Jayaratne
- Music by: Rohana Weerasinghe; Sangeeth Wickramasinghe
- Production company: Dil Films International
- Distributed by: EAP Circuit
- Release date: 25 March 2009
- Country: Sri Lanka
- Language: Sinhala

Sir Last Chance (Sinhala: සර් ලාස්ට් චාන්ස්) is a 2009 Sri Lankan Sinhala comedy film directed by Roy de Silva and produced by Soma Edirisinghe for EAP Films. It stars Vijaya Nandasiri, Sanath Wimalasiri and Lucky Dias in lead roles along with Anarkali Akarsha and Palitha Silva. Music co-composed by Rohana Weerasinghe and Sangeeth Wickramasinghe. It is the first DTS cinemascope digital comedy film made in Sri Lanka as well. It is the 1122nd Sri Lankan film in the Sinhala cinema.

== Plot ==
The story begins with the members of the private detective office led by Detective Last Chance. The office consists of six male detectives and five female detectives. Meanwhile, Mister Producer decides to recruit two Bollywood actresses for his latest film production due to force from his wife and daughter. Later he revealed that the film can earn good income as well. With that, Sri Lankan movie stars strongly protest against Bollywood actresses and make plans to kidnap the two foreign actresses with the help of Don Ladan. Mister Producer reveals the story of kidnap and he ask help from Detective Chance. The Detective selected two of his best men Arti and Viti to protect two actresses. The two detective safely bring two actresses to their home. Arti and Viti dressed up as two actresses and start to act like them. Meanwhile, Sri Lankan stars seek to kidnap fake actresses and make muhurath ceremony a funny act. However, after series of incidents, Ladan kidnap two fake actresses and demand a ransom of Rs. 50 million dollars, for their release. However, Arti and Viti reveal their actual appearance and catch all the gangs with the help of fellow detective and Sri Lanka stars, who later realized their mistakes. Finally, at the contract sign, two real Bollywood actresses reveal their presence and they ask to do the film with your own film stars. Arti and Viti had a ceremony and gifted with medals for the contribution. Finally Arti ask Detective Chance to give permission to marry his fiancée and detective gives the permission.

== Cast ==
- Vijaya Nandasiri as Detective Last Chance
- Lucky Dias as Mister Producer
- Palitha Silva as Don Ladan aka George Washingpowder
- Arjuna Kamalanath as Arjun
- Sanath Wimalasiri as Arti
- Anura Pathirana as Viti
- Anusha Damayanthi as Anu
- Nilanthi Dias as Sarojini
- Janesh Silva as Detective
- Chathura Perera as Detective
- Anarkali Akarsha as Arti's fiancée
- Rodney Warnakula as Detective
- Priyantha Seneviratne as Detective
- Anton Jude as Detective
- Mahinda Pathirage as Detective
- Teddy Vidyalankara as Ladan's henchman
- Sumana Amarasinghe
- Lahiru Mudalige
- Chanchala Warnasooriya

== Soundtrack ==
No.	Title	Singer(s)	Length
1.	"Dannawada Kauda Loke"	Vijaya Nandasiri, Rodney Warnakula, Anton Jude, Sangeeth Wickramasinghe
2.	"Rahase Meedum Sele"	Uresha Ravihari, Leslie Thomas
3.	"Awe Na Kiya Man"	Sangeeth Wijesuriya, Uresha Ravihari, Sangeeth Wickramasinghe
