= Saragi =

Saragi සරාගී
- Directed by: Louie Vanderstraeten
- Written by: Louie Vanderstraeten
- Produced by: Jude Muttiah
- Starring: Ravindra Irugal Bandara; Nilu Hettihewa; Sudath Dodangoda
- Cinematography: Dinesh Kumara
- Music by: Nino Leon
- Distributed by: SPM Films
- Release date: 22 December 2002
- Running time: 105 minutes
- Country: Sri Lanka
- Language: Sinhala

Saragi (Sinhala: සරාගී) is a 2007 Sri Lankan Sinhala adult drama film directed by Louie Vanderstraeten and produced by Jude Muttiah. It stars Ravindra Irugal Bandara and Nilu Hettihewa in lead roles along with Sudath Dodangoda and Laxman Arachchige. Music composed by Nino Leon. It is the 998th Sri Lankan film in the Sinhala cinema.

== Cast ==
- Ravindra Irugal Bandara
- Nilu Hettihewa
- Sudath Dodangoda
- Laxman Arachchige
- Gamini Kumara
- Madhu Jayaweera
- Vasantha Kumaravila
- Roshini Fernando
