= Ananda Wickramage =

Sri Lankan actor and comedian

- ආනන්ද වික්‍රමගේ
- Born: August 4, 1953 (age 73); Sri Lanka
- Occupations: Actor, comedian
- Years active: 1977–present
- Spouse: Manel Wanaguru (m. 1984)
- Children: 2

Ananda Wickramage (Sinhala: ආනන්ද වික්‍රමගේ, born August 4, 1953) is an actor in Sri Lankan cinema, stage drama, and television. During his career, he has acted in the teledramas Paba and Patalavilla, has played the president in the political sitcom And Company, and as Kotalawala in the stage drama Neinage Suduwa.

== Television career ==
Ananda Wickramage has acted more than 100 television serials. His role in the serials such as Patalavilla and Paba become highly popularized. He directed the television serial Menik Maliga, and Hada Pudasuna.

=== Selected television series ===
- Bonda Meedum
- Malee

== Filmography ==
Wickramage started his film career with Sudu Paraviyo back in 1977, with a minor role. Though he has acted more than 50 films across many genre, most of his characters remains supportive. His most popular cinema acting came through comedy roles in films Jeevithe Lassanai, Clean Out and Parliament Jokes.

Key
†	Denotes films that have not yet been released

Year	Film	Role	Ref.
1990	Christhu Charithaya	Aramathiye Joseph	
1994	Nohadan Amme		
1995	Sudu Walassu		
2001	Jolly Hallo	Veterinary doctor	
2002	Parliament Jokes	Minister Pushpakumara Karunathilake	
2002	Cheriyo Holman		
2003	Sepata Dukata Sunny	Station Master	
2003	Numba Nadan Apita Pissu	'Sakaladosha Dhuribhootha' Gurunnanse	
2004	Clean Out	Reggie	
2004	Ra Daniel Dawal Migel 3	Victor	
2006	Ali Patiyo Oyai Mamai	Thief Suminda	
2007	Mr Dana Rina		
2008	Wada Bari Tarzan Mathisabayata	Rival	
2009	Ali Surathal	Liyanage	
2010	Ape Yalu Punchi Boothaya	Cyril	
2010	Sara		
2011	Kiwwada Nahi Nokiwwada Nahi	Dharme ayya	
2011	Ethumai Methumai	Silva	
2010	Thank You Berty	Mr. Harry	
2012	Super Six	Jayasundara	
2012	Jeevithe Lassanai	J.V.P. Aaron	
2013	Ran Kevita 2	Suran's father	
2013	Doni	Abepala	
2015	Lantin Singho	Dudley Mithurusinghe / doppelgänger	
2016	Sinhaya	Newspaper editor	
2019	President Super Star	Program coordinator	
2024	Sihinayaki Adare		
TBA	Wedaduru Paradeesaya †		
TBA	Sulanga Numba Avidin †		
