= Arjuna Kamalanath =

Sri Lankan actor, filmmaker and model

Arjuna Kamalanath අර්ජුන කමලනාත්
- Born: Arjuna Kamalanath Karunaratne; September 10, 1975 (age 50); Moratuwa, Sri Lanka
- Education: Prince of Wales' College, Moratuwa
- Occupations: Actor, Director, Producer
- Years active: 1998–present
- Spouse: Ameesha Kavindi (m.2014)
- Parents: Thilak Karunaratne (father); Kumudu Buddadhasa (mother)

Arjuna Kamalanath Karunaratne (born 10 September 1975 as අර්ජුන කමලනාත්) [Sinhala]) is an actor in Sri Lankan cinema. Though he became popular as an actor in cinema, Kamalanath also performed as a director, producer and screenplay writer.

== Early life ==
Arjuna Kamalanath was born on 10 September 1975 as the only child. His father is Thilak Karunaratne and mother is Kumudu Buddadhasa. He completed his education from Prince of Wales' College, Moratuwa. He is married to fellow actress Amisha Kavindi.

== Beyond acting ==
He is the chairman of Hela Bala Kala Sansadaya organization. During 2014 Presidential Elections, his organization publicly supported Mahinda Rajapaksa's political campaign.

On 28 May 2018, Kamalanath was appointed as the Joint Managing Director of the MPI Film Circuit.

== Career ==
On August 16, 1998, Kamalanath acted in his first cinema creation, Mohothin Mohotha directed by Sunil Soma Peiris. Then he acted in the film Seetha Rae directed by Dharmashri Wickramasinghe. He mostly acted in many commercial low budget films in adult genre in early days. His first main role in cinema came through 2000 film Thisaravi with the role as a gay. Apart from cinema acting, he also acted in few television serials such as Supiri Tharuwa, Sansara Prarthana, Nilanjana and Wasuda.

=== As actor ===
Year	Film	Role	Ref.
1998	Mohothin Mohotha		
1999	Seetha Re		
2000	Kauda Bole Alice	Vickrama's friend	
2000	Thisaravi	Gay boy	
2000	Ege Vairaya 4	Arjuna	
2001	Kanyaviyakage Raththriya		
2001	Jack and Jill		
2001	Jolly Hallo	Johnny	
2001	Sundara Warada		
2001	Sellam Kukka		
2002	Pathiniyakage Horawa		
2002	Jolly Hallo 2		
2003	Vishma Rathriya		
2003	Numba Nadan Apita Pissu	Mahesh Damunupola	
2003	Sansun Nosansun		
2003	Hitha Honda Pisso	Ronnie	
2004	Haadu Wessak		
2004	Ginigath Horawa		
2004	Left Right Sir		
2004	Ohoma Harida	Mithrapala	
2004	Underworld	Mahesh	
2004	Jolly Boys	Jora	
2005	Sanduni		
2005	James Bond		
2005	Ukusu Es		
2006	Naga Kanya	Jagath	
2006	Sonduru Wasanthe	Mahinda	
2006	Double Game		
2007	Mr Dana Rina		
2007	Jundai Gundai		
2009	Sir Last Chance	Arjuna	
2010	Sudu Hansi	Anjana / Clifford	
2010	Jaya Pita Jaya	Vijay	
2011	Kiwwada Nahi Nokiwwada Nahi	Ronnie Wickramasinghe	
2012	Sakvithi Dadayama	Jackson aka Jackie	
2013	Igillenna Ai Dagalanne	Wickrama	
2013	Raja Horu	Sirimal	
2015	Maharaja Gemunu	Suranimala	
2016	Puthandiya	Podde	
2018	Kusal	Jackie	
TBD	Kondadeniye Hamuduruwo		
TBD	Kidnap	Waruna	
TBD	Elakandiye Marcus		
TBD	Nuhuru Vaeyama		
TBD	Hadagasma		

=== As director ===
Year	Film	Ref.
2009	Igillenna Ai Dangalanne	
2009	Kusal	
TBD	Ashawe Maaya	

=== As producer ===
Year	Film	Ref.
2009	Gharasarapa	

=== As screenplay writer ===
Year	Film
2009	Igillenna Ai Dangalanne
2009	Kusal
