= One Shot (2005 film) =

One Shot වන් ෂොට්
- Directed by: Ranjan Ramanayake
- Written by: Ranjan Ramanayake
- Produced by: EAP Films
- Starring: Ranjan Ramanayake; Anarkali Akarsha; Wilson Karunaratne
- Cinematography: Jayantha Gunawardena
- Edited by: Ravindra Guruge
- Music by: Somapala Rathnayake
- Distributed by: EAP Theatres
- Release date: 19 May 2005
- Country: Sri Lanka
- Language: Sinhala
- Budget: 9 Million LKR
- Box office: 9 SL Crores

One Shot (Sinhala: වන් ෂොට්) is a 2005 Sri Lankan Sinhala action film and a remake of the Tamil super hit film Baashha. It was directed by Ranjan Ramanayake and produced by Soma Edirisinghe for EAP Films. The film stars Ramanayake and Anarkali Akarsha in lead roles, alongside Wilson Karunaratne and Rex Kodippili. The music was composed by Somapala Rathnayake. A sequel, Ranja - One Shot One 2, was released in 2014. It is the 1051st Sri Lankan film in the Sinhalese cinema. The film was also screened in India.

== Overview ==
One Shot utilizes anamorphic lenses and features a Digital Theater System sound. The plot centers around the character "One Shot", who fights against injustice and corrupt politicians.

== Cast ==
- Ranjan Ramanayake as Vijaya aka 'One Shot'
- Wilson Karunaratne as Minister Walisundara
- Anarkali Akarsha as Sherry
- Anton Jude as Johnny
- Rex Kodippili as Cabinet minister Sallala Arachchi
- Kanchana Mendis as Vishaka
- Manike Attanayake as Rani
- Sriyani Amarasena as Vijaya's aunt
- Tyrone Michael as Dharme
- Ajith Lokuge as Somey
- Sandun Wijesiri as Vijaya's uncle
- Ariyasena Gamage as Regional minister
- Sunil Perera as Pushpakumara
- Ranjith Perera as Principle
- Susantha Chandramali as School Teacher
- Buddhika Rambukwella as Anandan
- Vasana Danthanarayana as Mohammad's Wife Nirmala
- Himali Siriwardena as Vijaya's dancer friend
- Kalum Wijesooriya as Inspector Mohammad
- Rajitha Hiran as Pushpakumara's secretary
- Anoja Weerasinghe as Ranjani
- Janesh Silva as Bowser
- Upali Keerthisena as Sathyapala
- D.B. Gangodathenna as Doctor Kallepotha
- Ravindra Randeniya as Police DIG
- Ignatius Gunaratne as Wijeratne
- Nilanthi Dias as Sherry's friend
- Srinath Maddumage as Wickie
- Sarath Chandrasiri as Poisoning waiter
- Don Guy as Horse Inspector
- Jeevan Handunnetti as Wedding officiator
- Nanda Wickramage as Buddhist monk
- Anusha Damayanthi in cameo appearance
- Sahan Ranwala as Inspector Ajaya, Vijaya's brother
- Chathura Perera as Toddy maker
