= Anarkali Akarsha =

Sri Lankan actress (born 1987)

Anarkali Aakarsha
- අනර්කලී ආකර්ෂා
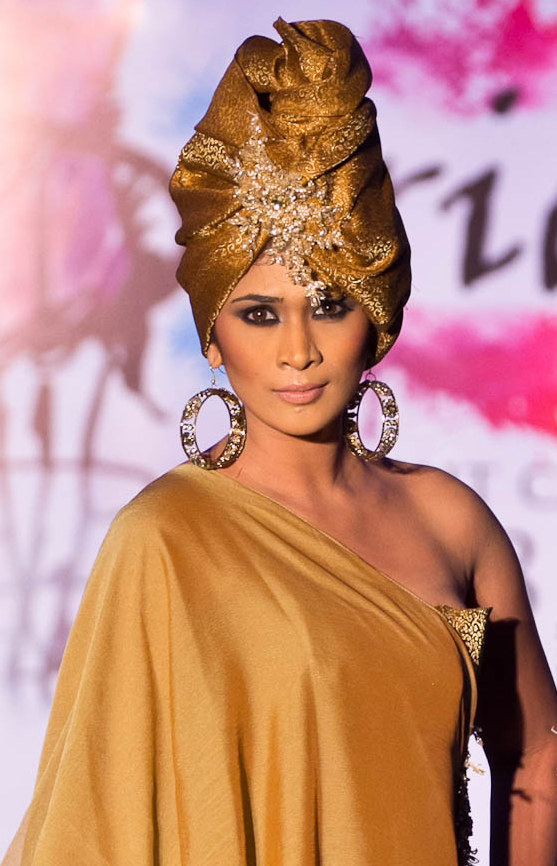
- Born: Anarkalli Janina Jayatilaka Aakarssha; 12 July 1987 (age 39); Colombo, Sri Lanka
- Occupations: Actress, model, politician
- Years active: 1995–2019
- Spouse: Dishan Jayasinghe (m. 2014)
- Children: 1
- Awards: Sarasaviya Most Popular Actress Award (2004), Presidential Award for performance in Anjalika (2005) Derena LUX Film award most popular actress (2012) & Miss Sri Lanka (2004)
- Website: www.anarkalli.com

Anarkali Akarsha (Sinhala: අනර්කලී ආකර්ෂා; born 12 July 1987 as Anarkali Janina Jayatilaka) is a Sri Lankan actress, model, former politician and beauty pageant titleholder. She was crowned Miss Sri Lanka 2004 and represented Sri Lanka at the Miss World 2004 beauty pageant. She has worked as a brand ambassador & a fundraiser.

== Early life and education ==
Akarsha attended Colombo International School.

== Film career ==
Her first public opportunity to act came when Somaratne Dissanayake and Renuka Balasuriya, who directed and produced the teledrama Iti Pahan in 1995, were in search of a little girl who was fluent in English. In the drama, she performed the role of "Daisy Susan" beside renowned actress Vasanthi Chathurani.

After a nearly seven-year hiatus, she returned to acting in 2003 when, at 15, she was cast in a lead role in Pissu Trible. Subsequently, she performed in several successful movies, and received acclaim in teledrama performances with her roles as "Inoka" in Sihinayak Paata Paatin and 'Tanya' in Santhuwaranaya.

She is the youngest actress to date in the history of Sri Lankan Cinema to win the most popular actress award. She has acted as the leading lady in more than 22 movies and 10 teledramas. She also works as a model, brand ambassador and a presenter.

In 2019, Anarkalli Akarsha was adjudged amongst the Top Three Most Beautiful and Hottest Sri Lankan Actress and Model by N4M Media. But she quit acting after her marriage.

== Political career ==
Anarkalli contested the Galle District at the 2009 Southern Provincial Council Election, and on 29 October 2009, she was elected to the Southern Province Council. She is the youngest female councillor to date, and the sole female member on the council.

== Career as a host ==
Anarkalli hosted her own TV show 'Anarkali Live' on TV Derana. She also hosted Derana Music Awards 2010. She hosted her own talk show, LIVE Sunday with Anarkalli on Swarnavahini.

== Personal life ==
Anarkalli currently lives in the US and hosts a Youtube channel. She is married to Dishan Jayasinghe in 8 December 2014. She is now a mother of one child.

== Filmography ==
Year	Film	Role	Ref.
2003	Pissu Trible	Nisansala	
2005	One Shot	Sherry	
2006	Hiri Poda Wessa	Veena	
2006	Anjalika	Kavya	
2006	Nilambare	Sherine	
2006	Eka Malaka Pethi	Taniya	
2006	Sonduru Wasanthe	Anju	
2007	Sikuru Hathe	OIC's daughter	
2007	Mr Dana Rina		
2008	Tharaka Mal	Suranya	
2009	Sir Last Chance	Arti's fiancée	
2010	Mago Digo Dai	Rosy	
2011	King Hunther	Moreen	
2011	Ethumai Methumai	Teena	
2011	It’s a Matter of Love	Natasha	
2015	Sanjana	Sanjana	
2016	July 7	Anarkali	
2019	Sikuru Yogaya	Hiruni	
TBD	Sihina Lowak	Main actress	

== Teledramas ==
Year	Teledrama	Role	Other notes
1995	Iti Pahan	Daisy Susan	
2004	Sihinayak Paata Paatin	Inoka	
	Sapphire and Silk	Tanya	
2004	Isi Dasuna		
2005	Arunodaya Kalapaya		
2006	Santhuwaranaya	Tanya	
2007	Kula Kumariya	Suwimali	
2007	Nethaka Maayavee		
2009	Sanda Sakki		
2010	Ran Thaliya Walauwa	Dosatara nona	
2012	Adariye		
2012	Saranganaa		
2012	Mini Muthu		
