= Yama Raja Siri =

- Production art
- Directed by: Sajeewa Sankalpa
- Written by: Nihal Premachandra; Sajeewa Sankalpa
- Produced by: Sajeewa Sankalpa; Pradeep Lanka Dharmawickrama; Neel Sanjeewa; Sangeeth Algama
- Starring: Bandu Samarasinghe; Tennyson Cooray; Rex Kodippili
- Cinematography: Sajeewa Sankalpa
- Edited by: Sajeewa Sankalpa
- Music by: Sajeewa Sankalpa
- Production company: AIBA Films
- Distributed by: LFD Films; MPI Films
- Release date: 29 March 2018
- Country: Sri Lanka
- Language: Sinhala

Yama Raja Siri is a 2018 Sri Lankan, Sinhala language, comedy film that is written, directed, edited and produced by Sajeewa Sankalpa. The film features comedy duo Bandu Samarasinghe and Tennyson Cooray for the one last time in lead roles, along with Rex Kodippili, Kumara Thirimadura and Nadeesha Hemamali in pivotal roles. The film was released on 29 March 2018, at the Tharangani Theatre. It is the 1301st Sri Lankan film in the Sinhala cinema.

Director Sajeewa Sankalpa worked in multiple roles on the production of this film; as director, producer, cinematographer, music director and editor, as well as working on background vocals, special sound effects, special visual effects, color and sound coordination, and song production.

== Plot ==
John (Bandu Samarasinghe) and Martin (Tennyson Cooray) are two friends who work as security guards at a cemetery. Soma (Gayathrie Dias) is John's wife and the couple have 11 children. Martin and his wife Padma (Shiromika Fernando) have 9 children. Both families live in poverty and endure very poor living conditions. One day, while John and Martin are guarding the cemetery, a very bright light appears in the sky, coming closer and closer, until finally two men emerge from the light dressed in magnificent robes. John and Martin think these men must be actors participating in some sort of street theatre, but, to their great surprise and disbelief, the men turn out to be King Yama (Ronnie Leitch), the King of Hell, and his assistant (Kumara Thirimadura).

At first John and Martin refuse to believe that it truly is King Yama himself. In order to convince them, the King creates an illusion of fire which amazes the two friends. Both are terrified and, bowing down to the King, ask him why he has come to Sri Lanka. The King informs them that he has come to find a virgin to marry. He orders John and Martin to carry out the search on his behalf, and provides them with everything they need in order to complete their quest. The King then returns to the underworld.

By chance the two friends meet a beautiful girl named Nil Nayani (Nadeesha Hemamali) and they tell her of the King's search. She is horrified at first, but John and Martin succeed in talking her into wanting to accept the proposal and marry the King of Hell. However, in the course of persuading Nil Nayani to marry the King, John and Martin both fall in love with the beautiful girl and forget all about their duty to report back to King Yama. The King waits in vain and, when he does not receive any word, becomes unhappy and cross. The changes in his behaviour make his wife, Yama Devi (Vinu Siriwardena), suspicious. In an attempt to find out the truth, Yama Devi travels to Sri Lanka where, using magic, she takes Nil Nayani's guise in order to trick the King and reveal his deception.

== Cast ==
- Bandu Samarasinghe as John, poor father of nine children. He works as a guard at a cemetery and lives with his family in very poor conditions. He finds a way to change their life by trying to find a girl for the King of Hell.
- Tennyson Cooray as Martin, one of the main characters in the film. He is the father of 11 children. He also works guarding the cemetery. After meeting the King of Hell, he experiences a life changing event.
- Ronnie Leitch as King Yama. His wife, Yama Devi, is very old by the human concept of long-standing in this world. He wants to leave his wife and is on a quest for a new Queen. Escaping Hell with his Senevi, he comes down to Sri Lanka where he meets John and Martin. He entrusts these men with the task of finding him a bride. He returns to hell.
- Rex Kodippili as Nilnayanee's father
- Kumara Thirimadura as Maha Senevi, Yama Raja's assistant
- Nadeesha Hemamali as Nilnayanee, the lead female role in this film. She lives in the care of social services, and is a good woman, living with two rich people who support her in providing social services and care for poor people. She meets John and Martin.
- Suraj Mapa as Guest appearance in song "Mumuna Kiyana"
- Shiromika Fernando as Padmaa, Martin's wife. She is a woman who is constantly fighting her husband. She has compassion for her husband, but is suspicious of him and she has a quick temper.
- Vinu Siriwardena as Yama Devi, wife of Yama. By the human concept of age, the Queen is hundreds of years old, but she has not lost the beauty of her youth.
- Gayathri Dias as Soma, John's wife. She always fights with her husband because of their poor living conditions, but sometimes she feels sad thinking about her husband.
- Nilmini Kottegoda as Mohini, Sumathi's wife. Despite her family issues she enjoys life doing social services work. She first meets John and Martin near Cemetery Road. She was dressed in white clothes, and when Martin first saw her he thought she was the Mohini (a female gost in Sri Lankan mythology).
- Richard Manamudali as Transgender
- Dimuthu Chinthaka as Yama Kaala
- Denuwan Senadhi as Priyankara, Servant of Nilnayanee
- D.B. Gangodathenna as Police Constable
- Anura Bandara Rajaguru as Swami
- Udaya Kumari as Asilina
- Rukshana Dissanayake as Paba, Servant of Nilnayanee. She loves Priyankara, but after seeing John and Martin she leaves her lover and runs away. She is afraid of John and Martin and thinks they are Devils.
- Berty Nihal Susiripala

== Production ==
On 28 January 2017, the director Sajeewa and the Aiba Films team announced that they were going to produce this film in collaboration with the comic duo Bandu Samarasinghe and Tennyson Cooray. Lanka Dharmawickrama had invited the duo to participate in the film with the intention of getting Bandu and Tennyson on board as directors. Bandu had previously directed Rodaya (1995), Pem Mal Mala (1997), Left Right Sir (2004), and Peter One (2011), and Tennyson had directed Thank You Berty (2011). However Bandu and Tennyson rejected the team's proposal. After further discussions, Bandu suggested Sajeewa as director. Bandu was impressed with Sajeewa's credentials in film producing, composing, writing and singing, and asked "If he is doing editing, cinematography and music direction, what's wrong with directing?" Following Bandu's proposal, Sajeewa was engaged on the film as director.

Bandu Samarasinghe and Tennyson Cooray's double act began with Nommara Ekai in 1987. Since then they featured together in a large number of productions such as Cheerio trilogy, Ra Daniel Dawal Migel trilogy, Rodaya, Jundai Gundai, Kolompoor, Somy Boys and Thank You Berty. Bandu and Tennyson had not appeared in a film together since Thank You Berty in 2011. Many critics and newspapers said that this was due to problems between the two actors, although they did host the television reality program Hiru Mega Stars - season 2 together. However, after 10 years, director Sanjeewa was able to bring the comic duo back together in this film.

== Music ==
Yama Raja Siri

Soundtrack album by Sajeewa Sankalpa
- Released: 29 March 2017
- Recorded: 2017
- Genre: Feature film soundtrack
- Label: Aiba Films
- Producer: Sajeewa Sankalpa

The film music was composed by Sajeewa Sankalpa, with Bandu Samarasinghe featuring as playback singer in a duet with his son Kanchana. One track, Mumuna Kiyana. was officially released on 21 April 2018. Lyrics are by Kalum Srimal and Sheham Galahitiyawa, and the singers include Sajeewa Sankalpa, Kavindya Adhikari, Hashini Wedanda, with Kavindya Adhikari making his debut in this movie as playback singer in cinema.

Track listing
No.	Title	Writer(s)	Singer(s)	Length
1.	"Mumuna Kiyana"	Shehan Galahitiyawa	Kavindya Adhikari ft Sajeewa Sankalpa	04:05
2.	"Asipiya"		Sankalpa & Hashini	03:36
3.	"Thale Nomathi Bere"		Bandu ft Kanchana	04:44
