= Yakadaya =

Yakadaya යකඩයා
- Directed by: Neil Rupasinghe
- Written by: Jorge Lesley Ranasinghe
- Produced by: Simon Marawanagoda
- Starring: Gamini Fonseka; Ravindra Randeniya; Anula Karunathilaka; Jenita Samaraweera
- Cinematography: Donald Karunarathna
- Edited by: W.D.K. Ruban
- Music by: Sarath Dassanayake
- Release date: 9 December 1977
- Country: Sri Lanka
- Language: Sinhala

Yakadaya (Sinhala: යකඩයා) is a 1977 Sri Lankan Sinhala action thriller film directed by Neil Rupasinghe and produced by Simon Marawanagoda. It stars Gamini Fonseka and Ravindra Randeniya in lead roles along with Anula Karunathilaka and Jenita Samaraweera. Music composed by Sarath Dassanayake. It is the 381st Sri Lankan film in the Sinhala cinema.

The film is loosely based on the life of popular criminal Sanchi Arachchige Jinadasa aka 'Maradankadawala Yakadaya'.

== Cast ==
- Gamini Fonseka as Sumanadasa 'Sumane' 'Yakadaya'
- Ravindra Randeniya as Siripala
- Jenita Samaraweera as Somey
- Anula Karunathilaka as Rathi
- Anthony C. Perera as Bandara
- Rex Kodippili as Police Chief
- Alexander Fernando as Chaubey
- Shanthi Lekha as Somey's mother
- Denawaka Hamine as Granny
- Wilson Karunaratne as Truck fighter
- Bandu Samarasinghe as Dancer
- Somy Rathnayake as Hit storekeeper

== Songs ==
The film consists with four songs.

No.	Title	Singer(s)	Length
1.	"Sithu De Pathu De Ituwi Yay"	H.R. Jothipala, Sujatha Aththanayaka
2.	"Malin Malata Bambarun Igile"	Latha Walpola
3.	"Yanawita Paare Ukula Natana Thaale"	H.R. Jothipala, M.S. Fernando
4.	"Asha Rali Dese Weli"	H.R. Jothipala, Sujatha Aththanayake
