= Ethalaya =

2020 Sri Lankan action film

- Directed by: Nalaka Vithanage
- Written by: Nalaka Vithanage
- Produced by: NK Films
- Starring: Kelum Kularatne; Chamathka Lakmini; Shehani Perera; Rex Kodippili
- Cinematography: Thilanka Perera; Indika Lakmal; Nishantha Pradeep
- Edited by: Thivanka Amarasiri
- Music by: Keshan Perera
- Distributed by: MPI, LFD, CEL Theaters
- Release date: 5 March 2020
- Country: Sri Lanka
- Language: Sinhala

Ethalaya is a 2020 Sri Lankan Sinhala action film directed by Nalaka Vithanage and co-produced by Dan Wijeratne with Kelum Aryan Kularatne for NK Films. It stars Kelum Kularatne, Chamathka Lakmini and newcomer Shehani Perera in lead roles whereas Gayathri Dias, Rex Kodippili and Shyam Fernando made supportive roles. Shehani is the younger sister of popular film actress Udari Perera.

The screening of the film halted due to prevailing COVID-19 pandemic in Sri Lanka. However, the film halls were reopened from 27 June 2020 and the film was re-released in film theaters. However, the producer Kelum Aryan expressed the injustice occurred during the screening of the film in the rescheduled period.

== Cast ==
- Kelum Kularatne as Suraj
- Shehani Perera
- Chamathka Lakmini as Ayanthi
- Rex Kodippili
- Shyam Fernando as Minister Lakshman Suranimala
- Gayathri Dias
- Dharmapriya Dias
- Teddy Vidyalankara

== Soundtrack ==
The film consists with three songs.

No.	Title	Singer(s)	Length
1.	"Sungare"	Poorna Sachintha
2.	"Ruweththi"	Keshan Perera
3.	"Asuru Sanekin"	Manthi Wijetunga
