= Ape Yalu Punchi Bhoothaya =

Ape Yalu Punchi Boothaya
- Film poster
- Sinhala: අපේ යාළු පුංචි භූතයා
- Directed by: Srilal Priyadeva
- Written by: Srilal Priyadeva
- Produced by: N. Udaya Kumar; P. Arooran
- Starring: Bandu Samarasinghe; Tennyson Cooray; Ananda Wickramage; Eardley Wedamuni
- Cinematography: Lalith M. Thomas
- Edited by: Siddhartha Nayanananda
- Music by: Edward Jayakody
- Production company: Balaji Cine Films
- Distributed by: Movie Producers & Importers Co (Pvt) Ltd
- Release date: 11 August 2010
- Running time: 140 minutes
- Country: Sri Lanka
- Language: Sinhala
- Budget: 25 million
- Box office: 43.6 million

Ape Yalu Punchi Boothaya (Sinhala: අපේ යාළු පුංචි භූතයා) is a 2010 Sri Lankan Sinhala children's film directed by Srilal Priyadeva and produced by N. Udaya Kumar for Balaji Films. The film revolves around a ghost kid who helped children to recover their bad lives to good ones. It stars comic duo Bandu Samarasinghe, Tennyson Cooray, Ananda Wickramage, D. B. Gangodathanna and Eardley Wedamuni. Music for the film is done by renowned musician Edward Jayakody. It is the 1143rd Sri Lankan film in the Sinhala cinema.

The film used digital technology extensively which is handled by Dreams and Magic Company. They introduced of the digital technology as well as High Definition Technology to the Sri Lankan cinematic industry.

== Cast ==
- Bandu Samarasinghe as Isurusiri, the astrologist
- Tennyson Cooray as Jeevan Gurunnanse
- Ananda Wickramage as Cyril
- D.B. Gangodathenna as Gurunnanse
- Eardley Wedamuni
- Asela Jayakody as Premaratne
- Vinusha Gaveen as Tharaka
- Dhanuskha Iroshani as Tharindu's step mother
- Sithija Abishek as Pancha, the Punchi Boothaya
- Kaveesha Nethmi as Bhagya
- Sinidu Tharaka as Tharindu
- Yasindu Adithya
- Teddy Vidyalankara as Uncle Tarzan, the Three-wheel driver
- Rajiv Nanayakkara as Wijeratne sir

== Soundtrack ==
No.	Title	Lyrics	Singer(s)	Length
1.	"Budu Hamuduruwo"	Sunil Ariyaratne	Edward Jayakody
2.	"Hai Hai Ape Yalu"	Sunil Ariyaratne	Sharanya Jayakody, Kasun Aravinda, Himasha Manupriya, Thanura Madugeeth, Praboda Pabasara, Supun Madushan
