= Pissu Puso =

2001 film by Sunil Soma Peiris

Pissu Puso පිස්සු පූසෝ
- Directed by: Sunil Soma Peiris
- Written by: Sunil Soma Peiris; Sudesh Wasantha Peiris
- Based on: Judwaa film
- Produced by: Sunil T. Films
- Starring: Bandu Samarasinghe; Dilani Abeywardana; Freddie Silva
- Cinematography: M. H. Gafoor
- Edited by: Kumarasiri de Silva
- Music by: Somapala Rathnayake
- Production company: Sunil T. Films
- Release date: 2 May 2001
- Country: Sri Lanka
- Language: Sinhala

Pissu Puso (Sinhala: පිස්සු පූසෝ) is a 2001 Sri Lankan Sinhala comedy action film directed by Sunil Soma Peiris and produced by Sudesh Wasantha Peiris and Sunil T. Fernando for Sunil T. Films. It stars Bandu Samarasinghe and Dilani Abeywardana in lead roles along with Freddie Silva, and Rex Kodippili. Music composed by Somapala Rathnayake. It is the 952nd Sri Lankan film in the Sinhala cinema. The film is loosely based on 1997 Bollywood film Judwaa, which was remake of 1994 Telugu film Hello Brother, which itself was loosely based on the 1992 Hong Kong action comedy film Twin Dragons.

== Plot ==
Ratnapala 'Ratne' is a criminal. Inspector Mahanama arrests him. Ratne wounds himself and is taken to the hospital, where Mahanama is waiting for his wife, who is in labour. She gives birth to twins and the doctor explains that both babies have a reflection mentality, which means that "what happens with one baby might be felt and reflected by another" depending on the proximity between them. Ratne escapes and takes one of the twins with him, injuring Mrs. Mahanama. Ratne left the kid on railway and escapes. Mahanama goes behind him, but unable to find his son, shoots Ratne in front of Ratne's son, Tony. After seeing this, Tony vows to take revenge from Mahanama when he grows up. Mrs. Mahanama falls into a coma unable to bear the loss of her son.

=== 25 years later ===
The lost kid grown up as Dougie who lives in a joyful way with his friend. On the other hand, Inspector Mahanama takes care of his disabled wife. Their other twin son grown up as Prema 'Prem' who lives as a decent person. Meanwhile, Ratne's son, Tony is also grown up and finds Mahanama and his sons to take revenge with his uncle. Soon, Dougie meets a young girl named Sulochana while Prem meets Rupa. They fall in love. Soon, Dougie and Prem and are confused by their identical appearance. Sometimes, Sulochana and Rupa mistake them for each other. However, one day, Dougie comes to Prem's house to find him. He sees Mrs. Mahanama and shakes her hand asking for Prem. Mrs. Mahanama gets out from coma. After seeing that, Mahanama realizes that Dougie and Prem are twins who had been separated from years and unites them. Meanwhile, Tony learns about Mahanama and his sons are Dougie and Prem. He kidnaps Sulochana and Rupa. Mahanama learns that and goes to there with Dougie and Prem. The two brothers together easily defeat Tony and he is arrested. The film ends with Dougie and Prem's wedding.

== Cast ==
- Bandu Samarasinghe as Dougie / Prema 'Prem' Kumara Mahanama
- Dilani Abeywardana as Sulochana
- Freddie Silva as Pachavansa
- Rex Kodippili as Inspector Mahanama
- Ravindra Yasas as Dougie's friend
- Mark Samson as Tony
  - Kasun Chamara as young Tony
- K. D. Siripala as PC Banda
- Janesh Silva as SI Piyasena
- Thushani Weerakody as Rupa
- Susila Kottage as Komala Rani
- Kapila Sigera as Rathnapala 'Rathne'
- Premadasa Vithanage as Tony's uncle

== Soundtrack ==
No.	Title	Singer(s)	Length
1.	"Adaraneeya Babo"	M. S. Fernando, Angeline Gunathilake
2.	"Honda Siriyawai Akase"	H. R. Jothipala, Sanjeewani Weerasinghe
3.	"Twinkle Twinkle"	M. S. Fernando, Angeline Gunathilake
