= Kauda Bole Alice =

Kauda Bole Alice කවුද බොලේ ඇලිස්
- DVD poster
- Directed by: Sunil Soma Peiris
- Written by: Sunil Soma Peiris
- Based on: Hollywood film
- Produced by: SY Films; Sunil T. Films
- Starring: Bandu Samarasinghe; Dilhani Ekanayake; Ravindra Yasas
- Cinematography: G. Nandasena
- Edited by: Kumarasiri de Silva
- Music by: Somapala Rathnayake
- Production companies: Dil Foses Lab; Sarasavi Lab; Neko Labs
- Release date: 14 April 2000
- Country: Sri Lanka
- Language: Sinhala

Kauda Bole Alice (Sinhala: කවුද බොලේ ඇලිස්) is a 2000 Sri Lankan Sinhala comedy action film directed by Sunil Soma Peiris and produced by SY Films and Sunil T. Fernando for Sunil T. Films. It stars Bandu Samarasinghe and Dilhani Ekanayake in lead roles along with Ravindra Yasas, and Rex Kodippili. Music composed by Somapala Rathnayake. It is the 933rd Sri Lankan film in the Sinhala cinema. It is a remake of Hollywood film Mrs. Doubtfire.

== Plot ==
Janaka and Nirmala are parents of three children. The couple gets a divorce due to differences between them specially because of Janaka's indifference towards his family. Although the couple is separated Janaka leaves home with regrets about his children.

Meanwhile Nirmala finds employment and looks out for a servant to look after her children in her absence. On seeing an advertisement for a servant Janaka came to the house in the guise of a woman named Alice, who cannot cook. However she wins the hearts of the family members. One day the two elder children identify Alice as their father but keeps it as a secret.

On an invitation from the head of Nirmala's work place the family members go for a dinner at a hotel. In the hotel Nirmala and others identify Janaka. Once again Janaka is forced to leave his children. But circumstances compel Janaka to return but not as Janaka but as Alice forever.

== Cast ==
- Bandu Samarasinghe as Janaka/ Alice
- Dilhani Ekanayake as Nirmala
- Ravindra Yasas as Siri Ayya
- Rex Kodippili as Nelson Fernando
- Suresh Gamage as Vickrama
- Sonia Disa as Hilda Nona
- Saman Hemaratne as Siri's friend
- Janesh Silva as Barber
- Arjuna Kamalanath as Vickrama's friend, cameo appearance
- Chathura Perera as Waiter, cameo appearance

== Soundtrack ==
| No. | Title | Singer(s) | Length |
|---|---|---|---|
| 1. | "Chuti Mage Podi Patto" | Bandu Samarasinghe and crew |
