= Deveni Warama =

- Sinhala: දෙවෙනි වරම
- Directed by: G. Nandasena
- Written by: Chinthaka Peiris
- Screenplay by: Chinthaka Peiris
- Produced by: G. Nandasena; Jagath Epaladeniya; R.A Saranapala
- Starring: Pubudu Chathuranga; Rishi Anjela; Tennyson Cooray
- Cinematography: Ayeshmantha Hettiarachchi
- Edited by: Anusha Jayawardena; Kasun Madhawa
- Music by: Harshan Shan
- Production company: Real Image Creations
- Distributed by: LFD & MPI Film Circuit
- Release date: April 22, 2016
- Country: Sri Lanka
- Language: Sinhala

Deveni Warama (Sinhala: දෙවෙනි වරම) is a 2016 Sri Lankan Sinhala romantic film directed by G. Nandasena and co-produced by G. Nandasena himself with Jagath Epaladeniya and R.A Saranapala. It stars Pubudu Chathuranga and newcomer Rishi Anjela in lead roles along with Tennyson Cooray, Rex Kodippili and Gayathri Dias. Music composed by Harshan Shan. It is the 1281st Sri Lankan film in the Sinhala cinema.

== Plot ==
Kusal Karaliyadda is a young man who doesn't like young girls. He wants to take the hand of a rural girl.

But Kusal does not belong to a rural generation. His father was a prominent minister in the country. The mother also belongs to the bourgeoisie. In spite of that, Samanmalee is the beauty who finds the merits of a rural rubber girl who falls for the simple countryside.

In the face of this arbitrary Kusal's quarrel, Kusal's father's father is adamant in his decision to marry a friend's daughter to Kusal. That proposed ruby also makes a lot of sacrifices to change Kusal's mind.

Amisha, Kusal, Samanmalee love story takes a different dimension as the magical third joins between the two who turn the bilateral love into a love triangle that meets Samanmalith while enjoying the series of films that revolve around different rural and urban environments.

== Cast ==
- Pubudu Chathuranga as Kusal Karaliyadde
- Rishi Anjela as Samanmali / Ameesha
- Tennyson Cooray as John, the chef
- Rex Kodippili as Wickrama Karaliyadde, Kusal's father
- Cletus Mendis as Somaratne
- Gayathri Dias as Receptionist
- Kumari Munasinghe as Samanmali's mother
- Samudra Hikkaduwa as Surangi Karaliyadde, Kusal's mother
- Premadasa Vithanage as Atapattu, security officer
- Chinthaka Peiris as Priyantha, Kusal's friend
