= Weli Pawuru =

- Film poster
- Sinhala: වැලි පවුරු
- Directed by: Sunil Premaratne
- Written by: Sunil Premaratne
- Starring: Mahendra Perera; Dilhani Ekanayake; Kumara Thirimadura
- Cinematography: Sajitha Weerapperuma
- Edited by: Anura Bandara
- Music by: Darshana Wickramatunga
- Production company: Eyon Films
- Distributed by: EAP Theaters
- Release date: 16 April 2019
- Country: Sri Lanka
- Language: Sinhala

Weli Pawuru (Sinhala: වැලි පවුරු, lit. 'Sand walls') is a 2019 Sri Lankan Sinhala family drama film directed by Sunil Premaratne and produced by Dammika Athapattu for Eyon Films. It stars Mahendra Perera and Dilhani Ekanayake in lead roles along with Kumara Thirimadura and Gayathri Dias. Music composed by Darshana Wickramatunga. The film received mixed reviews from the critics.

== Plot ==
Sisira and Piyumi are respectively husband and wife. They have a son called Kasun and a daughter called Kawya. Sisira is a government officer. At the beginning of the film he gets promoted as a chief clerk in his office. His son passes an exam and enters a job in an office where the chief officer is a friend of Sisira. Kasun has a fiancee in campus and Kawya builds up a relationship with a vagabond. Then Kawya runs off from home. Kasun also gets married. Meanwhile Sisira retires from his job. After some time Kawya comes back home for refuge with her son and husband. When the film progresses Kasun's mother in law meets her daughter's (Sonali's) past boyfriend Ryan who had kept hopes on marrying Sonali.

Kasun gets a foreign scholarship in England. Sonali and her mother also goes abroad with him. Kasun's mother in law persuades Kasun to get the ownership of his parents' house and lease it for their expenses for their expenses. In another place she persuades him to ask his father's gratuity money to buy him a car. Sisira and Piyumi loses their house because Kasun doesn't pay back the lease. Sisira and Piyumi lives in both Kasun's and Kawya's houses taking turns but they have a hectic time there. Finally Sisira takes Piyumi to his friend's house to live there. Sisira files a court case against his son for ignoring his duties towards his parents but after some time he gives it up because of the advice given to him by Piyumi's doctor. On the day that the court case was dismissed Sisira finds his wife collapsed on the floor.

Meanwhile Kasun gets sacked by his boss because of some disputes in his office. Sonali, her mom and Sonali's little daughter goes abroad and Sonali marries Ryan because her mother had persuaded her to do so. Kasun receives a letter from Sonali when he comes home and he is devastated. The flashback ends there.

The film is a flashback. A young lady visits a home for the elders to collect information for a research. She speaks with Sisira who is also living there after Piyumi's death. Sisira tells his story to the lady. At the end of the film she happens to find out that Sonali and Kasun are her parents.

== Cast ==
- Mahendra Perera as Sisira Ekanayake
- Dilhani Ekanayake as Piyumi Ekanayake
- Kumara Thirimadura as Jayantha
- Gayathri Dias as Sonali's mother
- Hemasiri Liyanage as Sisira's father (Cameo appearance)
- Nethalie Nanayakkara as helpless women (Cameo appearance)
- Soorya Dayaruwan as Kasun Ekanayake
- Dhananji Tharuka as Kavya Ekanayake
- Tharuka Wanniarachchi as Melisha
- Buwani Chapa Diyalagoda as Sonali
- Harith Wasala as Sandun
- Charith Senanayake
- Ryan Van Rooyen as Ryan
- Kumara Wanduressa
- Nilangani Perera
- Jayantha Galagedara as Mr. Lambert
- Priyanthi Mangalika as Mangalika

== Songs ==
The film consists with three songs.

No.	Title	Lyrics	Singer(s)	Length
1.	"Waralatha Sayura"	Bandara Eheliyagoda	Sunil Edirisinghe
2.	"Oba Sandak Una"	Ravi Siriwardena	Sashika Nisansala, Harshana Dissanayake
3.	"Keni Madala Ihiruna"	Shamila Hossain	Sashika Nisansala
