= Seya (film) =

Seya සේයා
- official title card
- Directed by: Kalyana Chandrasekara
- Written by: Kalyana Chandrasekara
- Produced by: Niro Films
- Starring: Udari Perera; Dilhani Ekanayake; Menik Wijewardena
- Cinematography: Lal Dias
- Edited by: Ruwan Chamara
- Music by: Sarath Wickrama
- Production company: Sarasavi studio
- Distributed by: Rithma (NFC)
- Release date: 15 March 2018
- Country: Sri Lanka
- Language: Sinhala

Seya (Sinhala: සේයා) is a 2018 Sri Lankan Sinhala horror film written and directed by Kalyana Chandrasekara and co-produced by A. Parister and Tharanga Athuraliya for Niro Films. It stars an all-female cast of 36 actresses, including, Udari Perera, Dilhani Ekanayake and Menik Wijewardena in lead role along with Deepani Silva, Vishaka Siriwardana and Gayathri Dias. Music composed by Sarath Wickrama. It is the first Sri Lankan film with an all-female cast. It is the 1299th Sri Lankan film in the Sinhala cinema.

title card

The film has been shot around Matale and Riverston areas.

== Plot ==
At the beginning of the film, it shows a girl placing a flower bouquet on a grave. One lady there, (I.P.Waruni) recalls her past and the film continues...

The film follows a story of a troupe of girls who are on an adventure to unearth the truth behind the death of a young girl called Krishani Mendis (fictional character) in the cold hill country.

The murderer is Nimesha, the elder sister of Nirasha (Udari) who is one of the girls who meet the spirit of Krishani in human form when they go to make a film in the hill country. Krishanthi calls herself Maduka, which isn't her real name.

The girls meet Maduka on their way to the villa where they stay on the days of shooting their film. Maduka tells them that her vehicle has broken down. The girls invite her to join them. They have a great time there. Sometimes they make the housekeeper annoyed. Nirasha writes the stript for their story. One night, the spirit of Krishani takes over Nirasha's body.

One of the girls gets injured in shooting the film so Maduka is asked to act instead of her. When they come home, they watch the film they made and admire Maduka's acting.

Meanwhile, one of the girls finds a newspaper advertisement that says it's a year since a person called Krishani Mendis had died. She notices that the picture in the advertisement is similar to Madukha's. She is horrified, and tells the other girls about this.

They watch the film again. To their astonishment, Maduka is not visible in the film. Instead, a smoke-like figure is visible. As the story moves on, the girls notice that Nirasha suddenly, behaves like Maduka. Funnily enough, when she becomes normal, she can't remember whether she did those things. For example, Nirasha can't drive cars but she drives a car which happens to be Krishanthi's. The servant of their house discovers that Nimesha does not behave in the decent manner as she used to do.

The girls meet I.P. Waruni(Dihani) in police and get her support to solve this mystery. At their first meeting, I.P. Waruni tells them that Krishani had committed suicide and they have found poison in her body, but with their request, she starts a new investigation. They go through details given by two of Krishani's friends Pathima and another friend Subadra (who is working as a nurse).

Meanwhile, Nirasha hit her mother on the head to get her hospitalized. I.P.Waruni goes to her house and discovers the connection between Krishani and Nimesha by seeing a photos of them by chance. Furthermore, she discovers that there was a big argument between them over a boy who was loved by both of them. I.P.Waruni finally decides to arrest Nirasha because she suspected her behaviour. She concludes that Nirasha did this purposely so that her elder sister Nimesha would come from abroad to see her mother. That would be the only way Krishani can take revenge from her.

The story concludes as Krishani uses Nirasha to take revenge from Nimesha. She pushes Nimesha from the cliff just as Nimesha pushed Krishani. Before that Nirasha injects poison into Nimesha's body just as Nimesha did to Krishani. At the end of the film Krishani goes out of Nirasha's body as she has taken revenge from her murderer.

== Cast ==
- Udari Perera as Nirasha Wanigasekara
- Dilhani Ekanayake as IP Waruni Dissanayake
- Menik Wijewardena as Madhuka and Krishani Mendis
- Nirosha Maithree as Nimesha Wanigasekara
- Deepani Silva as Encina
- Vishaka Siriwardana as Film School teacher
- Gayathri Dias as Doctor Shamali
- Manel Wanaguru as Madam
- Manel Chandralatha as Krishani's mother
- Sinethi Akila as Maali
- Indika Subasingha as Fathima Younus
- Malki Fernando as Komali
- Roma Rosy Jayakody as Subhadra
- Helen Renolda as Mrs. Wanigasekara, Nirasha's mother
- Thushari Wehella as Priya
- Sewwandi Dissanayake as Marry
- Isuri Kanchana as Jina
- Shahara Parami as IP Mangali

== Songs ==
The film contains four songs.

No.	Title	Singer(s)	Length
1.	"Seethala Muthu Pinne"	Chithru Paatali, Manjula Kannangara	3:33
2.	"Yan Kello"	Ginger, Manjula Kannangara	4:49
3.	"Ra Pura Sihinen Hade"	Chithru Paatali	4:13
4.	"Ginidal Mayawe"	Ginger
