= Dilhani Ekanayake =

Sri Lankan actress

- දිල්හානි ඒකනායක
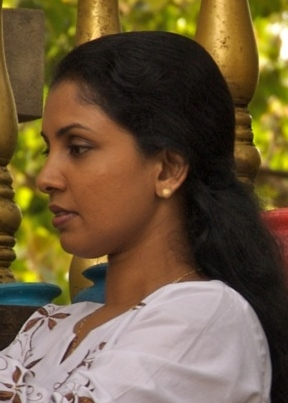
- Dilhani Ekanayake
- Born: Dilhani Ashokamala Ekanayake; 4 March 1970 (age 56); Colombo, Sri Lanka
- Occupation: Film actress
- Years active: 1990 - Present
- Spouse: Priyankara Perera
- Children: Dilmin Perera
- Relatives: Milton Perera (father-in-law); Chalaka Chamupathi (brother-in-law)
- Awards: Sarasaviya Best Actress Award; Sarasaviya Most Popular Actress Award

Dilhani Ashokamala Ekanayake (Sinhala: දිල්හානි ඒකනායක; born 4 March 1970) is an actress in Sri Lankan cinema, theater and television. One of the most popular film actresses in Sinhala cinema, Ekanayake has won several awards as the most popular actress in multiple times.

== Personal life ==
Ekanayake studied at St Clare's girls school, in Colombo. She is married to singer and actor Priyankara Perera son of singer Milton Perera. She has a son, Dilmin Perera.

In late 2020, her husband Priyankara was diagnosed with a kidney failure.

== Career ==
Before becoming a film actress, she acted in few ballets. In 1987, along with Channa Wijewardena, she performed the ballet Ukussa. Ekanayake made her cinema debut in 1991 film Dedunnen Samanaliyak directed by Yasapalitha Nanayakkara. In that year, she won the Sarasaviya award for the Best Upcoming Actress. In 1992, she won the award for the Most Popular Actress at the same festival.

Her early roles were confined to commercial films. Her ability to dance and her trade mark smile captivated the audiences. She is known as the Sridevi of Sri Lanka. Her career hit a different trail with her role as an abandoned Tamil girl in the film Me Mage Sandai by Asoka Handagama. This serious role paved the way for other remarkable performances in Sudu Kalu Saha Alu (Shades of Grey), Mage Wam Atha (My Left Hand) and Sulanga (Wind). In 2005, she again won the award for the Best Actress for the role Sudu Kalu Saha Alu at Sarasaviya Festival. In 2007, she won Presidential award for the Best Actress for the role in Sulanga.

Also she made some notable roles in Mage Wam atha, Sulanga, Me Mage Sandai, Sudu Kalu Saha Alu, Pem Kekula, Nilambare, Gamani and many comedy films such as Cheriyo Darling, Chaya Maya etc.

Though cited as a cinema actress, she has also starred in several teledramas of which Maya Ranga, Swarna Kingkini, Meeduma, Sath Sanda Kirana and Amarapuraya stand out. She plays a major role in the Sri Lankan movie star show Ridee Reyak, which is a very popular annual event in Sri Lanka. She also performed as a judge of Ranawiru Real Star and Mega Star as well. Her latest performance came through in Dhawala Doowili, Bharyawo, and Deviya Sugala teledramas.

== Awards ==
=== Sarasaviya Awards ===
Year	Nominee / work	Award	Result
1991	Dedunnen Samanaliyak	Best Upcoming Actress	Won
1992		Most popular Actress	Won
2002		Merit Award	Won
2002	All performances of the year	Special Jury Award	Won
2005	Sudu Kalu Saha Alu	Best Actress	Won

=== Presidential Film Awards ===
Year	Nominee / work	Award	Result
2001	Me Mage Sandai	Best Actress	Won
2005	Sulanga	Best Actress	Won
2023	Ginnen Upan Seethala	Best Supporting Actress	Won

=== Signis Salutation Awards ===
Year	Nominee / work	Award	Result
2001	Me Mage Sandai	Silver Performance (Female)	Won
2012	Gamani	Gold Performance (Female)	Won

=== Derana Film Awards ===
Year	Nominee / work	Award	Result
2012	Gamani	Best Actress	Won
2015	People's vote	Most popular Actress	Won
2018	Dharmayuddhaya	Best Actress	Won

== Filmography ==
Key
†	Denotes films that have not yet been released

Year	Film	Role	Ref.
1990	Dedunnen Samanaliyak		
1991	Wada Barinam Wadak Na	Thilini	
1991	Asai Bayai		
1991	Love In Bangkok		
1991	Dhanaya		
1992	Jaya Sri We Kumariye		
1992	Malsara Doni	Mangala	
1992	Chandi Rajina		
1992	Kulageya	Edna's younger daughter	
1992	Suranimala		
1993	Prathignawa	Vindya	
1993	Sarasa Sarisarana Thek Oba Mage		
1993	Mawila Penevi Rupe Hade		
1993	Chaya Maya	Chaya / Maya	
1993	Jeevan Malli		
1993	Sandarekha		
1993	Sura Weera Chandiyo	Kumari	
1994	Ekada Wahi		
1994	Jayagrahanaya		
1994	Nohadan Landune	Kanthi	
1994	Okkoma Hondatai	Anusha	
1994	Sudu Piruwata	Suranya	
1994	Love 94	Umani Baby	
1995	Vijay Saha Ajay	Hashini	
1995	Pudumai Eth Aththai	Thusha	
1995	Edath Chandiya Adath Chandiya	Pavithra	
1995	Dalulana Gini		
1996	Sabae Mithura		
1996	Cheriyo Darling	Miss Sweetie	
1996	Madhuri	Madhuri 'Madu'	
1997	Ramba Saha Madhu		
1997	Pemmal Mala	Pawansala	
1997	Re Ru	Kumari	
1999	Rathu Aluyama	Sulochana	
1999	Kolompoor	Tanisha	
1999	Koti Sana		
1999	Seetha Samire	Amitha	
1999	Nagaran	Chithra	
2000	Premilla		
2000	Kauda Bole Alice	Nirmala	
2000	Me Mage Sandai	Tamil Woman	
2000	Pem Kakula	Sumudu	
2001	Jack And Jill	Arundathi	
2001	Kolomba Koloppan	Dilhani	
2001	Sellan Kukka		
2002	Seethala Gini Kandu	Sunny's daughter	
2002	Pissu Double	Bhagya Ekanayake	
2002	Kalu Sudu Mal	Nirmala Mudunkotuwa 'Rohini'	
2002	Cheriyo Holman		
2002	Thahanam Gaha	Nirmala	
2002	Mage Wam Atha	Kamal's wife	
2002	Surapurata Kanyaviyak		
2003	Sundarai Adare	Meena	
2003	Pissu Trible	Cichchi Cichchi Baby	
2003	Sonduru Dadabima	Samangi Ranasinghe	
2003	Yakada Pihatu	Nadeesha Kulasobana	
2003	Sudu Salu	Thamara	
2003	Hitha Honda Pisso	Wimala	
2004	Bambara Sanakeli		
2004	Ra Daniel Dawal Migel 3	Kamala Baby	
2004	Ohoma Harida	Namali	
2004	Samawenna Ma Raththarane		
2004	Rajjumala	Punya	
2005	Sudu Kalu Saha Alu	Komala	
2005	Sulanga	Crisanthi	
2006	Naga Kanya	Madhu	
2006	Nilambare	Samadhi	
2006	Rana Hansi		
2006	Kurulu Pihatu	Shalika	
2006	Sewwandi	Shirani	
2007	Hai Master	Surangani	
2008	Puthuni Hambagiya	Uthpala	
2008	Siri Raja Siri	Sirimal's mother	
2008	Pitasakwala Kumarayai Pancho Hathai		
2009	Sinasuna Adaren	Mrs. Karandeniya	
2009	Akasa Kusum	Shalika	
2010	Thank You Berty	Mala	
2011	Sinhawalokanaya	Subharath Manike	
2011	Mahindagamanaya	Queen Ramadatta	
2011	Gamani	Sulochana Weerasekera	
2013	Ira Laga Wadi	Sewwandi	
2014	Siri Daladagamanaya	Queen of King Guhasiva	
2014	Parapura	Sudharma	
2014	Que Sera	Tara	
2014	Ko Mark No Mark	Rupika Mihirani	
2015	Spandana	Piyumi	
2015	Lantin Singho	Samadara	
2016	Sujatha Puthra	Mrs. Hettiarachchi	
2017	Aloko Udapadi	Queen Consort Anula	
2017	Kota Uda Express	Pabawathi	
2017	Dharmayuddhaya	Rani	
2017	Heena Hoyana Samanallu	Madhavi Wijebandara	
2017	Paha Samath	Samath's mother	
2018	Seya	IP Waruni Dissanayake	
2019	Ginnen Upan Seethala	Doctor's Wife	
2019	Weli Pawuru	Piyumi Ekanayake	
2019	Suba Theraniyo	Sumana	
2019	Reload	Princy	
2020	Rookada Panchi	Rangi's mother	
2021	Uthuru Sulanga		
2021	Jangi Hora	Nayani	
2022	Happy Birthday	Nita Saparamadu	
2023	Deweni Yuddhaya		
2023	Ape Principal	Principal	
2024	Minnu		
2025	Rosa Adare	Anuj's mother	
2025	Tentigo	father's mistress	
2025	Walampoori: Seven and Half Dreams	Madam Sisika	
2025	Soorya	Soorya's mother	
2025	Mother Lanka		
2026	Father	older Sandalatha	
2026	Dharmayuddhaya 2	Rani Harischandra	
2026	Sura Detuwo		
TBA	Angara †		
TBA	Tharu Athara †		
TBA	Mama Nemei †		
TBA	Magam Soli †		
TBA	Pashchima Yamaya †		
TBA	Pathikulaya †		
TBA	Oluwa Japan Kanda Jarman †		
