= Sonduru Dadabima =

Sonduru Dadabima සොඳුරු දඩබිම
- DVD poster
- Directed by: Anura Horatious
- Written by: Anura Horatious
- Produced by: Sadheera Films
- Starring: Sanath Wimalasiri; Dilhani Ekanayake; Tony Ranasinghe
- Cinematography: G. Nandasena
- Edited by: M. S. Aliman
- Music by: Premasiri Khemadasa
- Release date: 25 July 2003
- Country: Sri Lanka
- Language: Sinhala

Sonduru Dadabima (A Pleasurable Hunt) (Sinhala: සොඳුරු දඩබිම) is a 2003 Sri Lankan Sinhala drama thriller film directed by Anura Horatious and produced by W. A. S. K. Samarawickrema for Sadheera Films. It stars Sanath Wimalasiri and Dilhani Ekanayake in lead roles along with Tony Ranasinghe and Rex Kodippili. Music composed by Premasiri Khemadasa. It is the 1015th Sri Lankan film in the Sinhala cinema. The film has been shot in and around Colombo.

== Plot ==
The movie starts with a Sri Lanka Army deserter Kamal Palihakkara returning home to his parents and younger siblings. His father is angry at him for ruining the family name in the village by the frequent visits by the Military police. Father also blames him for abandoning his wife and child to which Kamal says it was the wife who left him.

Then four special agents of the Special Investigation Bureau (Galdwin, Dixit, Arnold, Michael) are seen going to meet 'Solomon Sahabandu', a powerful government minister, at his office. There the agents are then assigned to a mission where they have to prove the death of an Army officer named Sooriyabandara in a landmine is actually an assassination by Major Lankapura in which he was also killed. The minister wants to put the blame on the previous government. The agents are given identity cards and money required for the mission.

Kamal is then seen travelling in a bus where he meets 'Samangi Ranasinghe' with her daughter. Samangi tells Kamal that she is looking for her husband who is also a soldier who is she believe to be a prisoner of the LTTE. Kamal asks her it is too late to travel and invites her to stay with him. Before leaving Samangi asks for a photo of Kamal to keep with her.

Then two of the special agents question the bodyguard of Sooriyabandara who survived the attack and is now disabled. They explain that Sooriyabandara wanted to use his military accomplishments to enter politics which lead to a conflict with some politicians and ultimately his assassination. When asked, the bodyguard tells that he can assure that it was a landmine that killed Sooriyabandara but the agents insist it was a time bomb.

Another two agents question 'Madhumathi' who is the wife of Sooriyabandara. Madhumathi tells that Major Lankapura is an honest officer and argues that if he wanted to assassinate Sooriyabandara, he would not have got in the same vehicle. She accuses the agents of trying to frame someone to achieve their political agenda.

Then in a press interview Solomon Sahabandu tells the journalists about political assassinations carried out by the previous government and tells them that Sooriyabandara died because of a bomb planted in the vehicle and not a landmine. (the bodyguard can be seen laughing hysterically to show that it is a lie) Then a journalist asks what evidence they have to prove their claims to which an agent says that Sooriyabandara's wife has pledged her support to find the culprits. (Madhumathi can be seen laughing hysterically).

Then Samangi goes into a police station and is questioned by the sergeant Wimalasena. She tells she is from Nuwara eliya. She is then given accommodation at the police quarters. Seargent returns during the night drunk and tells that he recalled that Samangi was actually a woman he investigated few years ago for having relationships with different Army soldiers and Policemen. Then Samangi acts aggressively and cries out alleging that she is being raped and calling for help.

During a poolside party, Solomon Sahabandu thanks the newspaper editor Ranabahu for his role in toppling the previous government and asks his support in taking the narrative that Sooryabandara was assassinated, to the public.

Samangi meets Solomon Sahabandu, Madhumathi and the agents. There she tells them that her husband is the leader of an extrajudicial death squad named "gang of 13" and he confessed to the killing of Sooriyabandara by planting a bomb. She tells that she will support if she and her daughter are financially taken care of. When asked for information about her husband she tells that she is looking forhim and hands the agents the photo of Kamal Palihakkara, which she asked from him.

Then the agents visit an Army base to ask for information on the whereabouts of Kamal Palihakkara. Army says that there is no record of such a person. Finally the agents meet a soldier who identifies the photo and says that his real name is Dhammika Pitigala.

Meanwhile Samangi is alone with one agent and she asks for 250,000 Rupees, a house and a good school for her daughter in return for helping them to frame Kamal Palihakkara.

The agents then bring Kamal Palihakkara for questioning and starts interrogating him. He admits that he deserted from the Army to escape his terrible wife but rejoined as Dhammika Pitigala due to his patriotism. The next day the agents meet him with Samangi and her daughter. Samangi assaults Kamal blaming him for abandoning her and her child. Confused, Kamal approaches the girl and asks her if he is her father. The girl kisses him calling him father.

Then the agents offer Kamal to admit for the killing of Sooriyabandara in exchange for 50 million Rupees and ability to escape abroad and threaten to kill his whole family. Kamal insists that he is not married to Samangi and asks the agents if they have marriage certificate as proof. Agent Arnold says that they can make those evidence if they wish. After refusing agent Arnold beats Kamal. Then Kamal Palihakkara challenges agent Arnold for a fight and severely injure him after a brief confrontation.

Solomon Sahabandu calls the newspaper editor to publish about the assassination but he refuses telling that he knows how the confessions were taken and will wait for court decision. Then during the court proceedings prosecutor asks if she has any evidence to prove her marriage to Kamal. Samangi then hands over a file containing all the (fraudulent) documents.

In the final scene, an angry mob attacks Kamals house and drags away his elder sister. His mother, younger brother and sister are seen running away while his father is seen hanging from a tree.

== Cast ==
- Tony Ranasinghe as Solomon Sahabandu
- Dilhani Ekanayake as Samangi Ranasinghe
- Sanath Wimalasiri as Kamal Palihakkara 'Dhammika Pitigala'
- Rex Kodippili as Police OIC
- Mahendra Perera as Ranasinghe
- Kumara Thirimadura as Arnold
- Giriraj Kaushalya as Gladwin
- Wilson Karunaratne as Inspector Wimalasena
- G.R Perera as Kamal's father
- Miyuri Samarasinghe as Kamal's mother
- Kusum Renu as Madhumathi
- Srinath Maddumage as Lieutenant Jayasuriya
- Tyronne Michael
- Sumith Mudannayake as Dixit
- Dayadeva Edirisinghe as Ranabahu
- Sarath Kothalawala as Chicken Inspector
- Asela Jayakody as Captain Wickrama
- Teddy Vidyalankara as Arsonist
- Raju Gamage as Armed assaulter
- Gihan Fernando as Prosecutor
- Nilanthi Dias as Poolside dancer
