= Gayathri Dias =

Sri Lankan actress and beautician

Gayathri Dias ගයාත‍්‍රි ඩයස්
- Born: Wakunugoda Gayathri Irosha Dias; 16 April 1979 (age 47); Matara
- Occupations: Actress, Model
- Years active: 1994–present
- Spouse: Channa Perera (m. 1996)
- Children: Malsha Parindya; Duwasha Adithya
- Parents: Ranjith Henry Dias (father); Eujin Alahpperuma (mother)

Wakunugoda Gayathri Irosha Dias (ගයාත‍්‍රි ඩයස් [Sinhala]), popularly known as Gayathri Dias, is an actress in Sri Lankan cinema and television. Apart from acting, she is also a beauty queen, a presenter, a beautician and an entrepreneur.

== Personal life ==
Gayathri Dias was born in 1975 April 16 Matara as the second child of the family for Ranjith Henry Dias and Eujin Alahpperuma. She has one elder brother and one younger sister. Her father Ranjith worked at Czechoslovak Embassy until retired. Gayathri went several schools for education. Methodist College, Samudradevi and Karunaratne Bauddhaloka Maha Vidyalaya are some of them. Her mother Eujin died due to COVID-19 on 13 June 2021.

She is married to popular actor and director Channa Perera. She met Channa during the teledrama Makara Vijithaya. They got married on September 26, 1996. The couple has two daughters, Maleesha Parindya and Duasha Adithya. Elder daughter Maleesha completed education from Musaeus College. Duasha is currently studying at Royal Institute International School.

== Acting career ==
At the age of 17, while doing GCE A/L she got an appointment as the receptionist at TNL TV. Her maiden teledrama acting came through New Year teledrama, Udaara Geethaya. Her maiden cinematic experience came through a supportive role in 2001 film Oba Magema Wewa, directed by V. Siwadasan. Some of her popular films are Suwanda Denuna Jeewithe, Yamaraja Siri and Seya.

=== Selected television serials ===
- Dadayam Bambaru
- Eheth Ehemai
- Hiru Daruwo
- Kakuluvo Makuluwo
- Kolamba Ithaliya
- Maha Viru Pandu
- Makara Vijithaya
- Nataka Marai
- Nayanamina
- Neela Palingu Diya
- On Ataka Nataka
- Once Upon a Time in Colombo
- Paara Dige
- Pabalu
- Podi Mama
- Queen
- Udaara Geethaya
- Yes Madam

== Beyond acting ==
She participated to Miss Sri Lanka Contest in 1992 and won the 'Miss Photogenic' title. In 1994, she became 'Sirasa Ru Rajina' conducted by Maharaja Capital.

During Hair Asia Pacific 2003 competition, Dias won the most outstanding Sri Lankan performer's trophy as well as first runner up award for Nail Art category.

She represented Sri Lanka at the Mrs Top of the World 2016 beauty pageant. In the pageant, she won the mini pageant titled ‘Mrs Talent’ for a modern Kandyan dance item. She ranked fifth place at the pageant.

== Filmography ==
Key
†	Denotes films that have not yet been released

Year	Film	Role	Ref.
2001	Oba Magema Wewa		
2007	Asai Man Piyabanna	Praveen's sister	
2010	Suwanda Denuna Jeewithe	Rashmi's aunt	
2015	Lantin Singho	Lisy	
2016	Sinhaya	Manike	
2017	Deveni Warama		
2018	Seya	Doctor Shyamali	
2018	Yama Raja Siri	Soma	
2019	Weli Pawuru	Sonali's mother	
2019	Jaya Sri Amathithuma	Samanlatha	
2019	President Super Star	Kelum's wife	
2019	Reload	Tricksy	
2020	Ethalaya		
TBA	Hello Mister - Mama Director †		
TBA	Nimi †		
TBA	Case Number 447 †	filming	
