= Tennyson Cooray =

Sri Lankan comedian and director (1952–2020)

- ටෙනිසන් කුරේ
- Born: Merengnnage Edward Tennyson Cooray; 30 April 1952; Welimada, Sri Lanka
- Died: 28 September 2020 (aged 68); Colombo, Sri Lanka
- Occupations: Actor, Screenplay Writer, Film Director, Producer
- Years active: 1981–2020
- Spouse: Malsiri Eranjani
- Children: 1
- Awards: Best Comedian

Notes
- Received first award for his performances on stage and on screen from RavsFM.com Australia in the year 2009

Merengnnage Edward Tennyson Cooray (සිංහල:මෙරෙඤඤගේ එඩ්වඩ් ටෙනිසන් කුරේ) (30 April 1952 – 28 September 2020) was an Sri Lankan actor and comedian in Sri Lankan cinema and theater. One of the most popular comedians ever in Sinhala cinema with a career spanned more than three decades, Cooray was best known for comedy roles in several blockbuster film franchises such as Re Daniel Dawal Migel, Cheriyo, Peralikarayo, Wada Bari Tarzan as well as Somy Boys. In addition to acting, he also worked as a director and scriptwriter, singer, and lyrics writer.

== Personal life ==
He was born on 30 April 1952 in Welimada, [Sri Lanka] as the second of the family to a Catholic father and Buddhist mother. His father Merengnnage Edgar Stanley Arthur Cooray, who worked at Gamini Bus Company, learned to be a pastor for some time and also was a great reader of good English literature. His mother, Herath Mudiyanselage Ran Menika was a housewife. He studied at Kesebewa Junior School for primary education and then attended Willorawatta Protestant Catholic Mixed School also known as Moratuwa Methodist College. He only graduated Ordinary Level examination. He had one elder sister and a younger brother. When he was about ten years old, they used to go to the temple with mother on Poya day as well as to church on Sundays. Tennyson, who had previously attended an automotive course, later worked as a ship mechanic.

He was married to Malsiri Eranjani and the couple had one daughter, Madhumihiri, who is a teacher at Bishop’s College. Madhumihiri is married to Chaturanga Fernando, a businessman(Simple Music & Entertainment Pvt Ltd. They have one son, Chandru Mithushka and one daughter, Mindri Shenumika.

On 28 September 2020, Cooray died at the National Hospital in Colombo at the age of 68 due to a sudden heart attack. Remains were laid at Tennyson's House, 79/1, Willorawatta, Moratuwa for two days. The body was taken to the Rawathawatte Methodist Church at 4 pm and the final rites were performed at the cemetery on 1 October 2020.

== Career ==
At adolescent age, he performed at church festivals for about eight years with his friend Percy. Then he went to several drama interviews to take an opportunity to act in movies, but could not get a chance due to his appearance. Totally disappointed, one day his father told him that 'if you want to act, you can do a play that suits you'. Then he made a Vesak drama called Apaaye Thappara 1800. The play was intended to make people afraid to sin. He also administered the sound. It was shown about 35 times outside the Moratuwa area. (It was directed by Dinesh Priyasad in the 1990s as a film starring Gamini Fonseka in the lead role and the dialogues and screenplay by Tennyson). In 1971, he made a short film called "Hada Aedi Siththam". There he met Giwantha Arthasad and Bermin Lyle Fernando.

He began his career as a stage performer in a passion play staged at Moratumulla Church directed by Rev. Theodore H Perera. He further developed his drama skills at the Wesley Gulld and the Bible School of the Willorawatte Church. He has produced Christian Dramas for the NCC Radio. His maiden cinema acting came through Jeewanthi directed by Hemasiri Sellapperuma. His career completely changed when he met Giwantha Arthasad's younger brother, Dinesh Priyasad. The two did a little experiment together where they made a short film called "Action".

Cooray debuted in Sinhala cinema as a screenwriter in Dinesh Priyasad's directorial debut Nommara Ekai. He wrote the story and screenplay, as well as acted in the film. Producing the low-budget Nommara Ekai, it became a big hit. Later Dinesh joined a new project of Thilak Athapaththu, after the success of Nommara Ekai. Dinesh thought that Cooray knew what the people liked or disliked, and he turned to Cooray to write a new film script. He started to write a script, thinking like a main actor in the film. He asked for a chance to play the main character. Athapaththu refused because Cooray was a newcomer in the industry. and he wasn't ready to take a risk. Anyhow, he got a chance to perform a minor role in the film. Then Tennyson wrote the plot of the blockbuster hit Peralikarayo which was not only the most popular film of 1986, but also the highest grossing film of that year.

During Peralikarayo, Tennyson and Priyasad met Vijaya Kumaratunga. Later, they involved in Kumaratunga's first film production Waradata Danduwama. Later he got a chance to be the script writer for Priyasad's blockbuster hit Demodara Palama, where he played the role 'Vali Cooray' opposite to Gamini Fonseka. Priyasad's film Hithata Dukak Nathi Miniha was a film that pulls aside the acting style of Tenny where his ability for those adventurous scenes is highlighted in the film. He performed well not only in cinema but also on stage with the popular stage plays Man The Man, Captain Cool, Sivamma Dhanapala and I am Sri Lanka. In each of these stage plays, he discusses the issues and problems of the society in a humorous manner, tries to make the audience laugh as well as try to draw the audience's attention to the issues of the country.

He produced Akikaru Puthraya, the first Christian 16 mm Sinhala film and then he produced three stage dramas; Kurulla, Man The Man and I am Sri Lanka. He has also appeared in comedy films with fellow actor Bandu Samarasinghe on numerous occasions, including Re Daniel Dawal Migel, Cheriyo, Kolompoor, Parliament Jokes, and Somy Boys. All the films were blockbuster hits where as Bandu-Tenny duo made a comedy cinema wave during 1990s and early new millennium.

Around 2010, the Sarasaviya newspaper published a series of weekly Q&A articles with Tennyson under the title 'Tennysongen Ahanna'. It was a popular feature in the newspaper at the time. His answers to the questions posed by readers are hilarious. He has acted only a handful of television serials as he personally disliked acting in teledramas and preferred to be involved in major productions such as films.

Cooray wrote the story for Priyasad's Kolompoor and acted with Bandu, which became a blockbuster in that year. In 2001, Tennyson made his maiden cinema direction with the comedy film Thank You Berty. He also acted in the film along with longtime friend Bandu Samarasinghe. Apart from that, he also directed the home movie Eya Thamai Meya in 2015. In 2011, he went to the United Kingdom for a series of concerts organized by UK charity '1+1=1'.

In 2018, Tennyson acted in the film Yama Raja Siri with Bandu for the first time in 10 years. In the same year, he acted in the comedy theater play Reliy Remix produced by Sisil Gunasekara. Later, he won the award for the Best Comedian at 2018 Derana Lux Film Awards for the film Kota Uda Express.

=== Selected stage plays ===
- Captain Cool
- I am Sri Lanka
- Kurulla
- La Rosa
- Man The Man
- Raliya Remix
- Sivamma Dhanapala
- Tarzan The Baba

== Filmography ==
Key
†	Denotes films that have not yet been released

Year	Film	Role	Notes
1981	Jeewanthi		maiden cinema acting
1986	Peralikarayo	Tenny	film's scriptwriter
1987	Nommara Ekai	Koka Khan	film's scriptwriter
1987	Obatai Priye Adare	Anta	film's scriptwriter
1988	Chandingeth Chandiya		
1990	Sambudu Mahima		
1990	Hondin Nathnam Narakin		
1990	Pem Raja Dahana	Guru's ally	
1990	Esala Sanda	Don Frank Peter Anderson	
1990	Honda Honda Sellam	Tenny	
1990	Cheriyo Doctor	Attendant	
1991	Alibaba Saha Horu 40		
1992	Singha Raja		
1992	Sinhayageth Sinhaya		
1992	Ranabime Weeraya		
1992	Malsara Doni	A. Linganadan	
1993	Come or Go Chicago	Harrah the Karrah	
1993	Vijay Saha Ajay		
1994	Love 94	Ballpoint	
1995	Cheriyo Captain	Bantum	
1995	Demodara Palama	Wali Cooray	Story theme
1996	Cheriyo Darling	Doctor Dunath Mala 'D. M'	
1998	Re Daniel Dawal Migel 1	Migel	
1999	Kolompoor	Thadawansa	plays seven different roles
1999	Nagaran	Lakiya	
2000	Re Daniel Dawal Migel 2	Migel	
2001	Pissu Pusoo		
2001	Jonsun and Gonsun	Jonson	
2001	Kolamba Koloppan	Tenny	
2002	Parliament Jokes	P.K Amaris	
2002	Somy Boys	Bean	
2002	Love 2002	Tom	
2002	Seethala Gini Kandu	Tamil policeman	
2003	Aladinge Waldin	Aladdin 'Dean Martin'	
2003	Taxi Driver		
2003	Hitha Honda Pisso	Sunny	
2003	Vala In London	Valentine 'Vala' / Professor Serpentine	
2004	Re Daniel Dawal Migel 3	008 / Migel	
2004	Ohoma Harida	Sathyapala	
2004	Clean Out	Bookie	
2005	James Bond	Jamies	
2007	Jundai Gundai	Gunda	
2007	Hai Master		
2007	Weda Beri Tarzan	Tarzan / Mesan	dual role
2008	Ai Oba Thaniwela		
2010	Hadawatha Mal Yayai		
2010	Ape Yalu Punchi Boothaya	Jeevan Gurunnanse	guest appearance
2010	Wada Bari Tarzan Mathisabayata	Tarzan	
2011	Kiwwada Nahi Nokiwwada Nahi	Sanath Perera	
2011	Thank You Berty	Berty	Cooray's first directorial role
2012	Jeevithe Lassanai	Kalyana / Ku.Ku.La (Kude Kudu Laos)	
2013	Ranja	Johnny	
2014	Supiri Andare	Andare / Gulliver	Dual Role
2014	Parapura	Dilanga's friend	Minor role
2015	Singa Machan Charlie	Charlie	
2015	Eya Thamai Meya	Roma	Second directorial role, Home Movie
2017	Kota Uda Express	Weere	
2017	Devani Warama	John	
2018	Yama Raja Siri	Martin	
2019	Nathi Bari Tarzan	Tarzan	
2019	Thiththa Aththa	Walisinghe's secretary	
2019	Sikuru Yogaya	Koha	
2019	Jaya Sri Amathithuma	Secretary Silva	
TBA	Adda Lanuwa Damma Kodiya †		
TBA	Ugulai Magulai †		
