= Bandu Samarasinghe =

Sri Lankan actor, director, singer and comedian

- බන්දු සමරසිංහ
- Born: Bandusena Samarasinghe; November 22, 1952 (age 73); Kegalle, Sri Lanka
- Education: St. Mary's College, Kegalle St. Servatius' College
- Alma mater: St. Servatius' College
- Occupations: Actor, director, producer, singer, screenplay writer
- Years active: 1971–present
- Political party: Sri Lanka Podujana Peramuna
- Awards: Kala Bhushana

Kala Bhushana Bandusena Samarasinghe, popularly known as Bandu (බන්දු සමරසිංහ, born 22 November 1952), is an actor in Sri Lankan cinema, theater and television. One of the most popular comedians in Sinhala cinema, Bandu is best known for comedy roles in several blockbuster film franchises such as Re Daniel Dawal Migel, Cheriyo, Jolly Halo as well as Somy Boys. In addition to acting, he also worked as a director, scriptwriter, singer, lyricist and producer.

In April 2022, he was appointed as the Consul General in Milan, Italy replacing Neela Wickramasinghe who died while serving in the relevant position. However, it was revealed that the Sri Lankan diaspora in Milan did not approve of this appointment.

== Personal life ==
Bandu was on born on 22 November 1952 in a family of five children. His father Kegalle Podi Mahaththya (1917–1980) was a mechanic and his mother Lellagaha Goda Iskole Hamine (1925–2007) was a teacher. His preschool education came through St. Savior Convent and secondary education by St. Mary's College, Kegalle. He is a B-grade singer in Sri Lanka Broadcasting Corporation.

Bandu is married to Swarna Samarasinghe where the couple has two daughters; Rasoga and Hiranga, and one son, Kumara Kanchana, who is also an actor and singer. Kanchana and Rasoga also acted in Bandu's fourth cinema direction Peeter One. In mid 2018, Kanchana released his first music video Sura Dewliye.

== Career ==
=== as an actor ===
Starting as early as 1971 at the age of 17 or so, Bandu started his cinema career with Sadahatama Oba Mage. He acted in slapstick comedies along with Freddie Silva in the 1980s. He acted in more than 98 Sri Lankan films up to 2018. Almost 95 percent of the films were comedies and very few were dramas.

He started stage drama career with the play No Problem directed by Nilanthi Dhammika and produced by Niroshan Devapriya. Its maiden show was staged at Nithyanjal in Kandana on February 26, 2000.

Bandu Samarasinghe and Tennison Cooray were able to build a formidable comic duo combination and both of them act number of films together such as Ra Daniyel Dawal Mige, Cheriyo, Kolompoor, Somy Boys, James Bond and Thank You Berty. Bandu acted several iconic roles in Sinhala cinema such as "Daniel" in Ra Daniel Dawal Migel, "Marmite" in Cheerio Doctor and "Ikke Karolis" in political comedy Parliament Jokes. In 2019, he was awarded as the best actor in a comic role in Derana Film Awards.

In 2018, Tennison acted in the film Yama Raja Siri with Bandu for the first time in 10 years.

=== As a director ===
Before his comedy partner, Tennyson Cooray moved to direction in 2013, Bandu started to showcase his talents in direction. His first direction film Rodaya released in 1995 and gained much attraction. In 1997, he made the film Pemmal Mala and then Left Right Sir in 2004. In 2010, he made his maiden television serial Dara Garaj which gained huge popularity.

In 2013, Bandu directed the comedy blockbuster Peter One where he introduced his son Kanchana and second daughter Rasoga into silver screen. The shooting work began on August 5, 2012 and the shooting was completed on November 1, 2012. Permission for the film was obtained from the Board of Directors on December 18. The media briefing was held on December 20, 2012. The film was screened on May 10, 2013.

=== Television ===
His first teledrama acting came under his own direction, through Dara Garaj. And he acted few teledramas like Roy de Silva's Tarzan Ape Man, Giriraj Kaushalya's Nana Kamare, Sikuru Lanthe and Nishantha Weerasinghe's Dankuda Banda. His first "Bandu Live In Concert" was held on 10 July 2005 and after 11 years, he performed his next Bandu Live in Concert on 27 August 2016 at BMICH.

Bandu along with Tennison and Yureni Noshika acted as hosts for Hiru Mega Star season 2. He also hosts the chat program Talks With Bandu telecast by Hiru TV.

== Filmography ==
Key
†	Denotes films that have not yet been released

Year	Film	Role	Notes
1971	Sadahatama Oba Mage	Assistant manager	Minor Role
1974	Kasturi Suwanda		Minor Role
1976	Nilla Soya		
1977	Chandi Putha		
1977	Yakadaya	Dancer	
1978	Chandi Shyama		
1978	Asha Dasin		
1980	Mal Kekulu		
1981	Chanchala Rekha	Kapila	Debut an Actor
1982	Halo Shyama		
1982	Mihidum Sihina		
1984	Bambara Patikki		
1986	Peralikarayo	Chuty Malli	Also as a playback singer
1986	Yali Hamuwennai		
1987	Nommara Ekai	Datha Khan	First Bandu-Tenny Dou
1987	Yukthiyada Shakthiyada		
1988	Angulimala	Basura	
1990	Thanha Asha	Perera	
1990	Dedunnen Samanaliyak		
1990	Hitha Honda Puthek	Bandu	
1990	Madhu Sihina	Appu	
1990	Weera Udara		
1991	Bambara Kalape		
1991	Paradise		Guest appearance
1991	Cheriyo Doctor	Marmite	
1991	Ali Baba Saha Horu 40		
1992	Ranabime Weeraya		
1992	Okkoma Kanapita	Kanapita	
1992	Sinhayangeth Sinhaya		
1992	Sakkara Sooththara		
1992	Raja Daruwo		
1993	Soorayan Athara Weeraya		
1993	Chaya	Johnny	
1994	1950 Mulleriyawa		
1994	Love 94	Bakar	
1994	Athma	Foreman's supporter	
1994	Sujatha		
1994	Hallo My Darling		
1995	Rodaya	Sudha	First direction and producing
1995	Mama Baya Ne Shyama	M.S. Anandan	
1995	Inspector Geetha		
1995	Vairayen Vairaya		
1995	Cheriyo Captain	Huntin / Fruit salad	Dual role
1996	Weediye Weeraya		
1996	Cheriyo Darling	Marmite	
1997	Pemmal Mala	Murichchi Silva	Second direction and producing. Also playback singing.
1998	Re Daniel Dawal Migel 1	Daniel	
1999	Kolompoor	A.S.P. Bandu	
1999	Koti Sana		
2000	Kauda Bole Alice	Janaka 'Alizina 'Alice' Almeida'	
2001	Hai Hui Babi Achchi	Bandu 'Miss Dimple Mylawa'	
2001	Re Daniel Dawal Migel 2	Daniel	
2001	Pissu Puso	Dougie / Prema 'Prem' Kumara Mahanama	Dual role
2001	Oba Koheda Priye	Princy	
2002	Parliament Jokes	E.K. Karolis	
2002	Cheriyo Holman		
2002	Pissu Double	Tintin	
2002	Jolly Hallo	Brando	Sarasaviya Award – Creative Performance
2002	Somy Boys	Bush/Bandusena Mudalali	Dual role
2002	Seethala Gini Kandu	Addiya	
2003	Ra Daniel Dawal Migel 3	"007" Daniel	
2003	Pissu Trible	Junda	
2003	Sepata Dukata Sunny	Sunny	
2003	Sundarai Adare	Towel Boy	
2003	Numba Nadan Apita Pissu	Baby Sam Talky / Mr. Almeida	
2004	Rajjumala	Sekara	
2004	Left Right Sir		Third direction
2005	James Bond	Bond aka Banda	
2006	Ali Patio Oyai Mamai	Theft	
2006	Rana Hansi		
2006	Supiri Balawatha	Eddie	
2007	Hai Master	Bandara	
2007	Jundai Gundai	Junda	
2008	Ai Oba Thaniwela		
2010	Ape Yalu Punchi Boothaya	Isurusiri-the Astrologist	
2011	Thank You Berty	Norty	
2013	Peeter One	Peeter	Fifth direction
2013	Seetha Man Awa	Rama	
2015	My Name is Bandu	Bandu	Nominated for "Derana Film Awards Best Comedy Role"
2018	Yama Raja Siri	John	
2024	Buffalo Travels		

== Director and actor ==
Year	Film	Note
1995	Rodaya	Producer
1997	Pemmal Mala	Producer
2004	Left Right Sir	Producer
2010	Dara Garaj	Director, producer
2013	Peter One	Co-producer

== Songs ==
Title	Film	Other(s)
Sinhayo Wagei Api	Peralikarayo	H.R. Jothipala
Visky Kade Pusa	Peralikarayo	–
Rubber Walalu Uda Yakada Godak	Nommara Ekai	Chandra Devadhithya
Mis Konda Kirilli	Nommara Ekai	–
Warella Warella	Nommara Ekai	Somasiri Fernando, Chandra Devadhithya
Kada Bendala	Yukthiyada Sahakthiyada	Freddy Silva
Goni Billa Ko	Hitha Honda Puthek	Freddy Silva, Ananda Perera
Raja Ubane Gona	Okkoma Kanapita	Freddy Silva
Aluth Irak Aluth Sandak	Madhu Sihina	Angeline Gunathilake, Mervyn Perera
Kasi Athe Kasi Nathe	Raja Wansen Ekek	Ranjan Ramanayake, Freddy Silva
Ehe Yanawa Kawruth Ehe Yanawa	Bambara Kalape	Freddy Silva
Lan Wela Lan Wela	Ali Baba Saha Horu 40	Angeline Gunathilake
Nawa Hiru Sandu Payala	Rodaya	Milton Mallawarachchi, Nihal Nelson
Me Rate Weddu	Inspector Geetha	Freddy Silva, Christien Gunawardena
Cheerio Kiyala Me Api Yanne	Cheerio Captain	Gratien Ananda, Freddy Silva
Wadath Agei Hithath Hondai	Cheerio Captain	Gratien Ananda
Ale Karannam Romiyo Mage	Cheerio Darling	Latha Walpola
Sanda Amathuma Widiyata Me Raye	Pem Mal Mala	Latha Walpola
Ne Ma Eda	Pem Mal Mala	Latha Walpola
Chuti Mage Podi Patto	Kauda Bole Alis	–
Roobara Siribara	Hai Hui Babi Achchi	Maya Damayanthi, Mervyn Malewana, Koreen Almeida
Doti Doti Bodime Doti	Hai Hui Babi Achchi	Sunil Perera, Gemunu Wijesuriya
Kawdai Kawdai	Re Daniel Dawal Migel 2	Sangeeth Wickramasinghe, Champa Kalhari, Kushani Sandarekha
Goori Boori Waada Bheeda	Oba Koheda Priye	Freddy Silva, Angeline Gunathilake, Latha Walpola
Gamaralai Moda Relai	Supiri Balawatha	H.R. Jothipala, Ananda Perera
Sulange Hemin Ennako	Peeter One	–
Tomiya Karawala	Peeter One	–
Pawee Enu Mena	My Name Is Bandu	
Tin Belekka	–	–
Lassana Mal Mal	–	Uresha Ravihari

== Awards ==
- Creative Performance – Sarasaviya Awards – 2001
- SLIM Nelson Peoples Award – 2006
- Kala Bhushana – 32rd Kala Bhushana Awards – 2016
- Signis Sri Lanka Saluation – 2015
- Derana Film Awards – Best Comedy Role – 2019
