= Reload (film) =

- Sinhala: රීලෝඩ්
- Directed by: Susantha Dharmapriya
- Written by: Harith Wasala
- Produced by: Kamal Dharmapriya; Mahinda Uduwana; Dhammika Priyadarshana
- Starring: Kumara Thirimadura; Dilhani Ekanayake; Roshan Pilapitiya
- Cinematography: Mahesh Karunaratne
- Edited by: Elmo Haliday
- Music by: Roshan Thisera; Kapila Maddegoda
- Production companies: Sarasavi Studio, Kelaniya
- Release date: 22 November 2019
- Country: Sri Lanka
- Language: Sinhala

Reload (Sinhala: රීලෝඩ්) is a 2019 Sri Lankan Sinhala comedy thriller film directed by Susantha Dharmapriya and co-produced by Kamal Dharmapriya, Mahinda Uduwana and Dhammika Priyadarshana. It stars Kumara Thirimadura, Dilhani Ekanayake in lead roles along with Roshan Pilapitiya and Tharuka Wanniarachchi. Music co-composed by Roshan Thisera and Kapila Maddegoda.

== Cast ==
- Kumara Thirimadura as Sadasarana Mudalige Alapatha
- Dilhani Ekanayake as Princy, Alapatha's wife
- Giriraj Kaushalya as Lekam
- Harith Wasala as Roy Alapatha, Alapatha's son
- Tharuka Wanniarachchi as Chaya, Yama's daughter
- Roshan Pilapitiya as Yama King
- Gayathri Dias as Tricksy
- Teddy Vidyalankara as Bonny
- Sarath Chandrasiri as driver Sanath Vipuladeva
- Mahinda Pathirage as Music teacher
- D.B. Gangodathenna as Doctor
- Hemantha Eriyagama as Police sergeant
- Chathura Perera as Alapatha's bodyguard
- Nandana Hettiarachchi as Drunken person
- Rajasinghe Loluwagoda as Buddhist monk
- Manjula Moragaha as Sampath
- Ariyasena Gamage as God beseecher
- Keerthi Bandara as Astrologer in hell
- Jeevan Handunneththi as Bus conductor
- Sanet Dikkumbura as Kapuwa

== Songs ==
The film consists with four songs.

No.	Title	Lyrics	Singer(s)	Length
1.	"Hora Boruwa Nisa"	Harith Wasala	Sandun Fernando
2.	"Samanala Katu"	Harith Wasala	Anjalika Sanjeewani
3.	"Bona Kana Yalu"	Wimalajith Dombagahawatte	Wimalajith Dombagahawatte
4.	"Nilankara Veediye"	Sandaruwan	Asanka Dhananjaya
