= Me Mage Sandai =

Me Mage Sandai මෙය මගේ සඳයි
- Directed by: Asoka Handagama
- Written by: Asoka Handagama
- Produced by: Upul Jayasinghe
- Starring: Saumya Liyanage; Dilhani Ekanayake; W. Jayasiri
- Cinematography: Channa Deshapriya
- Edited by: Ravindra Guruge
- Music by: Rohana Weerasinghe
- Release dates: 2000 (London Film Festival); August 10, 2000 (Sri Lanka)
- Running time: 102 minutes
- Country: Sri Lanka
- Language: Sinhala

Me Mage Sandai (This is My Moon) (Sinhala: මෙය මගේ සඳයි) is a 2000 Sri Lankan Sinhala drama film directed by Asoka Handagama and produced by Upul Jayasinghe for Nilwala Films. It stars Dilhani Ekanayake and Saumya Liyanage in lead roles along with W. Jayasiri and Linton Semage. Music composed by Rohana Weerasinghe. It is the 961st film in the Sri Lankan cinema.

== International screening ==
The second screening of the film was held at the Elphinstone Theatre, at 4.00 and 7.00 pm on 2 August 2001. The film represented Tokyo international film festival. It also screened at Cheirs Du Cinema, Autumn film festival in Paris as the inaugural film.

== Plot ==
A Sinhalese soldier (Saumya Liyanage) fighting against rebels struggling for Tamil independence is left behind by his company one night. While hiding in a bunker, he's discovered by a Tamil woman (Dilhani Ekanayake), who eventually get sexually abused by him. Due to stockholm syndrome, she proceeds to follow the soldier after he comes to the realization that his company isn't coming back, and he decides to leave the fighting behind and return home.

However, the soldier's return doesn't bring much joy to his village—his family, who imagined he was dead, was counting on his pension to help them dig their way out of poverty, while his fiancée refuses to have anything to do with a deserter. With no one willing to help him in his village, in his despair, the soldier finds himself turning to the Tamil woman for affection.

== Cast ==
- Dilhani Ekanayake
- Saumya Liyanage
- W. Jayasiri
- Linton Semage
- Hemasiri Liyanage
- Kaushalya Fernando
- Sunil Hettiarachchi
- Anoma Janadari

=== Awards ===
- 2001 Singapore International Film Festival
  - SFC Young Cinema Award
  - NETPAC/FIPRESCI
- 2001 Tokyo International Film Festival
  - Asian Film Award - Special Mention
