= Supiri Balawatha =

Supiri Balawatha සුපිරි බලවතා
- Directed by: Padmasiri Kodikara
- Written by: Padmasiri Kodikara
- Produced by: Anura Abeysekara
- Starring: Jeevan Kumaratunga; Ranjan Ramanayake; Bandu Samarasinghe; Cletus Mendis
- Cinematography: M.A Gafoor
- Edited by: Nishantha Pradeep
- Music by: Somapala Rathnayake
- Release date: 9 February 2006
- Country: Sri Lanka
- Language: Sinhala

Supiri Balawatha (Sinhala: සුපිරි බලවතා) is a 2006 Sri Lankan Sinhala comedy, action film directed by Padmasiri Kodikara and produced by Anura Abeysekara. It stars Jeevan Kumaratunga, Ranjan Ramanayake, Bandu Samarasinghe in lead roles along with Sunil Hettiarachchi and Cletus Mendis. Music composed by veteran composer Somapala Rathnayake. It is the 1065th Sri Lankan film in the Sinhala cinema.

== Cast ==
- Jeevan Kumaratunga
- Ranjan Ramanayake
- Bandu Samarasinghe
- Sunil Hettiarachchi as Florist mudalali
- Lionel Deraniyagala
- Cletus Mendis as Gajanayake
- Manel Wanaguru
- Alexander Fernando
- Lal Senadeera

== Soundtrack ==
No.	Title	Singer(s)	Length
1.	"Gamaralai Moda Ralai"	H. R. Jothipala, Bandu Samarasinghe, Ananda Perera
2.	"Obe Denayana"	H. R. Jothipala, Sujatha Attanayake
3.	"Ramaniya Kamaniya"	H. R. Jothipala, Latha Walpola
4.	"Jeevath Wee Palak Na"	Freddie Silva, S. Kalawathi
5.	"Parama Ramani Ape Ale"	H. R. Jothipala, Latha Walpola
