= Naga Kanya =

Naga Kanya නාග කන්‍යා
- Directed by: A.A. Junaideen
- Written by: A.A. Junaideen
- Produced by: A. N. J. Films
- Starring: Sanath Gunathilake; Dilhani Ekanayake; Arjuna Kamalanath
- Cinematography: Lalith M. Thomas
- Edited by: Kumarasiri de Silva
- Music by: Somapala Rathnayake; Asokaa Peiris
- Distributed by: CEL Theatres
- Release date: 6 January 2006
- Country: Sri Lanka
- Language: Sinhala

Naga Kanya (Sinhala: නාග කන්‍යා) is a 2007 Sri Lankan Sinhala horror romantic film directed by A.A. Junaideen and produced by P. Arooran for A. N. J. Films. It stars Sanath Gunathilake and Dilhani Ekanayake in lead roles along with Arjuna Kamalanath and Sriyantha Mendis. Music co-composed by Somapala Rathnayake and Asoka Peiris. It is the 1062nd Sri Lankan film in the Sinhala cinema.

== Cast ==
- Sanath Gunathilake as Saman
- Dilhani Ekanayake as Madhu
- Arjuna Kamalanath as Jagath
- Sriyantha Mendis
- Rex Kodippili
- Norbert Rathnasiri
- M.K. Sudakar
- K. Janaki
- Harinath
