= Jaya Sri Amathithuma =

- Sinhala: ජය ශ්‍රී ඇමතිතුමා
- Directed by: Nishantha Weerasingha
- Written by: Nishantha Weerasingha
- Produced by: Janitha Films
- Starring: Sriyantha Mendis; Tennyson Cooray; Kusum Renu
- Cinematography: Ayeshmantha Hettiarachchi; Ravindra Rohana
- Edited by: Pravin Jayaratne
- Music by: Sunil Perera
- Distributed by: CEL Theaters
- Release date: 11 September 2019
- Country: Sri Lanka
- Language: Sinhala

Jaya Sri Amathithuma (Sinhala: ජය ශ්‍රී ඇමතිතුමා) is a 2019 Sri Lankan political comedy film directed by Nishantha Weerasingha and produced by Janitha Marasinghe for Janitha Films. It stars Sriyantha Mendis and Tennyson Cooray in lead roles along with Kusum Renu and Damitha Abeyratne. The music was composed by Sunil Perera.

Initially scheduled to be released in April, the film was postponed due to the Easter Bombings. Then it was rescheduled to be released on 6 September and then finalized to be screened on 11 September in CEL theaters including Regal, Colombo, Lido, Borella and 50 cinemas island wide.

== Cast ==
- Sriyantha Mendis as Minister Galigamuwa
- Tennyson Cooray as Secretary Silva
- Kusum Renu as Godamune madam
- Damitha Abeyratne as Mrs. Galigamuwa
- Gayathri Dias as Samanlatha
- Luxman Amarasekara as Thug
- Ariyasena Gamage as Morris, Madam's secretary
- D.B. Gangodathenna as drunken person
- Jeevan Handunnetti as Jaya, body parts dealer
- Prasad Galappaththi as Doctor
- Chirantha Ranwala as Doctor
- Shiromika Fernando in uncredited role
- Shantha Gallage as Coconut plucker

== Songs ==
The film consist with one song.

No.	Title	Lyrics	Singer(s)	Length
1.	"Diyawanna Oye Inna"	Chandradasa Fernando	Sunil Perera
