= Koti Sana =

Koti Sana කොටි සනා
- Directed by: Ranjith Siriwardena
- Written by: Somapala Leelananda
- Based on: Somapala Leelananda
- Produced by: Sonia Films; Sunil T. Films
- Starring: Jeevan Kumaratunga; Dilhani Ekanayake; Anusha Damayanthi
- Cinematography: G. Nandasena
- Edited by: Kumarasiri de Silva
- Music by: Somapala Ratnayake
- Production companies: Dil Foses Lab; Sarasavi Lab
- Release date: 21 October 1999
- Country: Sri Lanka
- Language: Sinhala

Koti Sana (Sinhala: කොටි සනා) is a 1999 Sri Lankan Sinhala action thriller film directed by Ranjith Siriwardena and co-produced by Sonia Disa for Sonia Films and Sunil T. Fernando for Sunil T. Films. It stars Jeevan Kumaratunga and Dilhani Ekanayake in lead roles along with Anusha Damayanthi, Sonia Disa, and Bandu Samarasinghe. Music composed by Somapala Ratnayake. It is the 923rd Sri Lankan film in the Sinhala cinema.

== Cast ==
- Jeevan Kumaratunga as Koti Sana
- Dilhani Ekanayake
- Anusha Damayanthi
- Sonia Disa as Koti Sana's mother
- Bandu Samarasinghe
- Chunky Ipalawatte
- Cletus Mendis
- Nayana Kumari
- Harshani Dissanayake
- Thilak Jayaweera
- Susila Kottage
- Alexander Fernando
- Susan Fernando
- Eric Francis
- Premadasa Vithanage

== Soundtrack ==
No.	Title	Singer(s)	Length
1.	"Seetha Meedume Seetha Sakwale"	Gratien Ananda, Nirosha Virajini
2.	"Siripalalaa"	H. R. Jothipala, Asoka Peiris, Jagath Wickramasinghe, Walter Fernando, Lalith Ponnamperuma
3.	"Sungara Gee Raawa"	Jagath Wickramasinghe, Nirosha Virajini
