= Ohoma Harida =

2004 Sri Lankan comedy film

Ohoma Harida ඔහොම හරිද
- DVD cover
- Directed by: Sunil Soma Peiris
- Written by: Sunil Soma Peiris
- Produced by: Sunil T Films
- Starring: Tennyson Cooray; Dilhani Ekanayake; Arjuna Kamalanath
- Cinematography: Lalith M. Thomas; M. H. Gafoor
- Edited by: Kumarasiri de Silva
- Production company: Dil Process Lab
- Release date: 9 September 2004
- Country: Sri Lanka
- Language: Sinhala

Ohoma Harida (Sinhala: ඔහොම හරිද) is a 2004 Sri Lankan Sinhala comedy film directed by Sunil Soma Peiris and produced by Sunil T Fernando for Sunil T Films. It stars Tennyson Cooray and Dilhani Ekanayake in lead roles along with Arjuna Kamalanath and Rex Kodippili. It is the 1037th Sri Lankan film in the Sinhala cinema.

== Cast ==
- Tennyson Cooray as Sathyapala
- Arjuna Kamalanath as Mithrapala
- Mohan Hettiarachchi as Vasantha 'Driver'
- Rex Kodippili as Gajasinghe Mudalali
- Dilhani Ekanayake as Namali
- Vijaya Nandasiri as Namali's Father
- Sunil Hettiarachchi as Weerasinghe 'Mudalali'
- Anusha Damayanthi as Thushari
- Susila Kottage as Namali's Mother
- Upali Keerthisena as Kappuwa
- Rajitha Hiran as Vadda
- Kapila Sigera as Samson
- Samanthi Lanerolle as Weerasinghe Mudalali's wife
- Kusala Perera as Kumari
