= Parliament Jokes =

Parliament Jokes පාර්ලිමන්ට් ජෝක්ස්
- Directed by: Ranjan Ramanayake
- Written by: Ranjan Ramanayake
- Based on: Ranjan Ramanayake
- Produced by: Lak Films
- Starring: Ranjan Ramanayake; Bandu Samarasinghe; Tennyson Cooray
- Cinematography: Jayanath Gunawardena
- Edited by: Densil Jayaweera
- Music by: Somapala Rathnayake
- Distributed by: E.A.P Films
- Release date: 23 February 2002
- Country: Sri Lanka
- Language: Sinhala

Parliament Jokes (Sinhala: පාර්ලිමන්ට් ජෝක්ස්) is a 2002 Sri Lankan Sinhala comedy, action film directed by Ranjan Ramanayake and produced by Lal Kaluarachchi for Lak films. It stars Ranjan Ramanayake, comic duo Bandu Samarasinghe, and Tennyson Cooray in lead roles along with Ananda Wickramage, Wilson Karunaratne, Sasanthi Jayasekara and Sanoja Bibile. It is the 973rd Sri Lankan film in the Sinhala cinema.

== Plot ==
There is a public meeting on how people in a certain village should elect their leader. The meeting is handled by the village monk. The Father of the Church and the Muslim Mudali are supporting the Leader of the House, irrespective of ethnic or religious differences. But it was the insane politician, Walisundara (Wilson), who suddenly broke in. He threatened the Chief monk with his thuggery powers and threatened to give Walisundara preferential treatment.

Meanwhile, there are three brothers in the other side of the village. Eldest of the trio, Amaris (Tennyson) is a thief famous for smuggle coconuts. Second son Karolis (Bandu) is a drunk who smuggle toddy. The youngest one Lavaris (Ranjan) has a strange fond for girls. The trio who are without any employment rest on father's (G.R.) shoulders. After several comedy incidents, the three sons leave the house to plow the fields at the father's request. The trio moved into the paddy field and brought a political discourse to the paddy fields. They reached an election rally conducted by minister Pushpakumara (Ananda), interrupting the conversation of the three. The candidate informed one of the brothers to vote for him this time. Amaris took advantage of the opportunity, asking for a pocket of cash and a bottle

Meanwhile, Walisundara's election campaign is being carried out fraudulently. He consulted with his media advisor (Upali) on future elections. Pushpakumara was prepared to fight Walisundara face to face in the election. He relied on his henchmen and entered Walisundara's domain. The discussion of the three brothers was about raising money. Lavaris was determined to be president because he was the highest office of the president. After the fight, Pushpakumara fainted and brought to the bank of stream. During this time, he met the three brothers again. Pushpakumara asks them to be his assistants and they accepted it and moved to Pushpakumara's house. At the house, Lavaris saw minister's daughter (Sasanthi) and flirts on her. However with their ugly looking and protruded teeth, she hated them and threw them away.

The young girl was impressed when she saw the three handsome young men who worked out and taught English. The trio were in love with this girl. Despite the comforts of the comrades Pushpakumara, their aim was to divide Pushpakumara and Walisundara and go to the President. Pushpakumara launched his final rally in the run-up to the election campaign. Due to the lack of people at their meetings, the three brothers will be given a plan: When the people of Pushpakumara addressed him, he was bombed and stabbed to several places in the body. It was the plan and its responsibility was transferred to Walisundara, who won the election with a paltry margin of 3 votes.

The trio contributed to Pushpakumara's victory and rewarded with a small sum of Rs. 150. Then the trio were drawn to Walisundara. They took money from him and left for their hometown. As soon as they entered the village, they were captured by the villagers and ready to be punished for their robberies. They paid off all their theft losses before they were punished. The villagers finally got their preference because the trio were contesting the presidential election from the new party. Then parents brought to Colombo and have them comfort. Meanwhile, Karolis tries to get the girl he loves and the other two get angry. Karolis was able to win his girlfriend anyway. Pushpakumara took action to get the trio involved in the upcoming elections. With the support of the two brothers, Amaris ran for the 2001 presidential election.

== Cast ==
- Bandu Samarasinghe as Madduma 'Ikke Karolis'
- Tennyson Cooray as Puwakpitiya Kewatillage 'Pu. Ke.' Amaris 'Loku Aiyya'
- Ranjan Ramanayake as Lavaris 'Podi Eka'
- Ananda Wickramage as Minister Pushpakumara Karunathilake
- Wilson Karunaratne as Walisundara
- Sasanthi Jayasekara as Pushpakumara's daughter
- Sanoja Bibile as Pushapakumara's wife
- Rathna Sumanapala as Mother of three sons
- G.R Perera as Father of three sons
- Raja Sumanapala as Guneris
- Manike Attanayake as Guneris's Wife, Menike
- Janesh De Silva as Jothi
- Chathura Perera as Sumathi
- D.B. Gangodathenna as Mudalali
- Upali Keerthisena as Janamadhya Upadeshaka
- Rajasinghe Loluwagoda as Village monk
- Freddie Silva guest appearance

== Soundtrack ==
No.	Title	Lyrics	Singer(s)	Length
1.	"Manape Illa Api Awe"	Neil Warnakulasuriya	Sunflowers

== Remake ==
The remake of the film was released on 11 January 2019. The director explained about a possible sequel during an interview.
