= Rajjumala =

Rajjumala රජ්ජුමාලා
- Directed by: Anura Chandrasiri
- Written by: Anura Chandrasiri
- Produced by: Chithrani Hidurangala
- Starring: Bandu Samarasinghe; Dilhani Ekanayake; Suvineetha Weerasinghe
- Cinematography: Ruwan Costa
- Music by: Nalaka Anjana Kumara
- Distributed by: C. N. A. Enterprises
- Release date: 21 October 2004
- Country: Sri Lanka
- Language: Sinhala

Rajjumala (Sinhala: රජ්ජුමාලා) is a 2004 Sri Lankan Sinhala mystery, thriller film directed by Anura Chandrasiri and produced by Chithrani Hidurangala. It stars Bandu Samarasinghe and Dilhani Ekanayake in lead roles along with Suvineetha Weerasinghe, and Roshan Pilapitiya. Music composed by Nalaka Anjana Kumara. This is the first dramatic role played by Bandu Samarasinghe. It is the 1042nd Sri Lankan film in the Sinhala cinema. Amarasiri Peiris won the Sarasavi Award for the Best Singer in 2004. Shooting of the film was complete in and around the locations in Pelmadulla, Wadduwa and Panadura areas.

== Cast ==
- Bandu Samarasinghe as Sekara
- Dilhani Ekanayake as Punya
- Suvineetha Weerasinghe as Sekara's mother
- Roshan Pilapitiya
- Nirosha Herath
- G.R Perera
- Kumara Jayakantha

== Soundtrack ==
No.	Title	Lyrics	Singer(s)	Length
1.	"Rajjumala"	Chinthani Hindurangala	Amarasiri Peiris
2.	"Mudu Seetha"		Deepika Pryadarshani
