= Hai Master =

Hai Master හායි මාස්ටර්
- Directed by: Ranjith Siriwardena
- Written by: Ranjith Siriwardena
- Produced by: Suranga de Alwis
- Starring: Jeevan Kumaratunga; Dilhani Ekanayake; Bandu Samarasinghe; Tennyson Cooray; Freddie Silva
- Cinematography: Bandula Cooray
- Edited by: Kumarasiri de Silva
- Music by: Gratien Ananda
- Distributed by: Film Location Service; T.K Enterprises
- Release date: 3 August 2007
- Country: Sri Lanka
- Language: Sinhala

Hai Master (Sinhala: හායි මාස්ටර්) is a 2007 Sri Lankan Sinhala comedy, action film directed by Ranjith Siriwardena and produced by Suranga de Alwis. It stars Jeevan Kumaratunga, Dilhani Ekanayake, comic duo Bandu Samarasinghe, and Tennyson Cooray in lead roles along with Freddie Silva, Lionel Deraniyagala, Sunil Hettiarachchi and Wilson Karunaratne. It is the 1091st Sri Lankan film in the Sinhala cinema.

== Cast ==
- Jeevan Kumaratunga as Saman
- Dilhani Ekanayake as Surangani
- Bandu Samarasinghe as Bandara
- Tennyson Cooray as
- Roy de Silva as Master
- Freddie Silva as Pushpadeva
- Sunil Hettiarachchi as Arachchila servant
- Sumana Amarasinghe as Piyambika
- Lionel Deraniyagala
- Wilson Karunaratne
- Srinath Maldeniya
- M. S. Fernando
- Lal Senadeera
- Nihal Silva
- Susila Kuragama

== Soundtrack ==
No.	Title	Singer(s)	Length
1.	"Hai Ahanna Lassana Nona"	M. S. Fernando
2.	"Thanam Thanam Dena"	Champa Kalhari
3.	"Seetha Hada Arane"	Gratien Ananda, Maya Damayanthi
4.	"Rajunge Otunne"	Nuwan Gunawardana, Champa Kalhari
5.	"Palu Hada Arane"	Maya Damayanthi
