= Que Sera (film) =

- Sinhala: කේ සෙරා
- Directed by: Parakrama Jayasinghe
- Written by: Parakrama Jayasinghe
- Produced by: ELF Movies
- Starring: Dilhani Ekanayake; W. Jayasiri; Michelle Herft
- Cinematography: G. Nandasena
- Edited by: M. S. Aliman
- Music by: Somapala Rathnayake; Lelum Ratnayake; Mahesh Denipitiya
- Distributed by: CEL Theatres
- Release date: 19 September 2014
- Country: Sri Lanka
- Language: Sinhala

Que Sera (Sinhala: කේ සෙරා) is a 2014 Sri Lankan Sinhala dark comedy romance film directed by Parakrama Jayasinghe and co-produced by Mayali Jayasinghe and Rishini Jayasinghe for ELF Movies. It stars Dilhani Ekanayake and W. Jayasiri in lead roles along with Priyankara Perera and Cyril Wickramage. Music co-composed by Somapala Rathnayake, Lelum Ratnayake and Mahesh Denipitiya. The film runs with both English and Sinhala dialogues. It is the 1212th Sri Lankan film in the Sinhala cinema.

Yoshini Abeysekera made her debut acting in cinema with this film with the support of English theatre veteran Hans Billimoria. The film has won many awards at the film award ceremonies.

== Cast ==
- Dilhani Ekanayake as Tara
- W. Jayasiri as Ananda
- Michelle Herft as Sera
- Yoshini Abeysekera as Samantha
- Hans Bilimoria as Billy
- Priyankara Perera as Lakmal
- Sando Harris as James
- Amarasiri Kalansuriya
- Anura Bandara Rajaguru as Exorcist
- Cyril Wickramage
- Oshini Perera
- Chami Senanayake
- Bandula Suriyabandara
- Rahal Bulathsinhala
- K. A. Piyakaru as Nadan
- Anjela Seneviratne
- Manel Wanaguru
- Nita Fernando
- Damith Fonseka
- Srimal Wedisinghe
- Sandun Wijesiri

== Awards ==
- Best Actress at Derana Film Awards 2015 - Michelle Herft
- Best Director at Derana Film Awards 2015 - Parakrama Jayasingha
- Best Supporting Actor at Derana Film Awards 2015 - Hans Billimoria
