= Rex Kodippili =

Sri Lankan film actor and director (1938–2023)

Rex Kodippili රෙක්ස් කොඩිප්පිලි
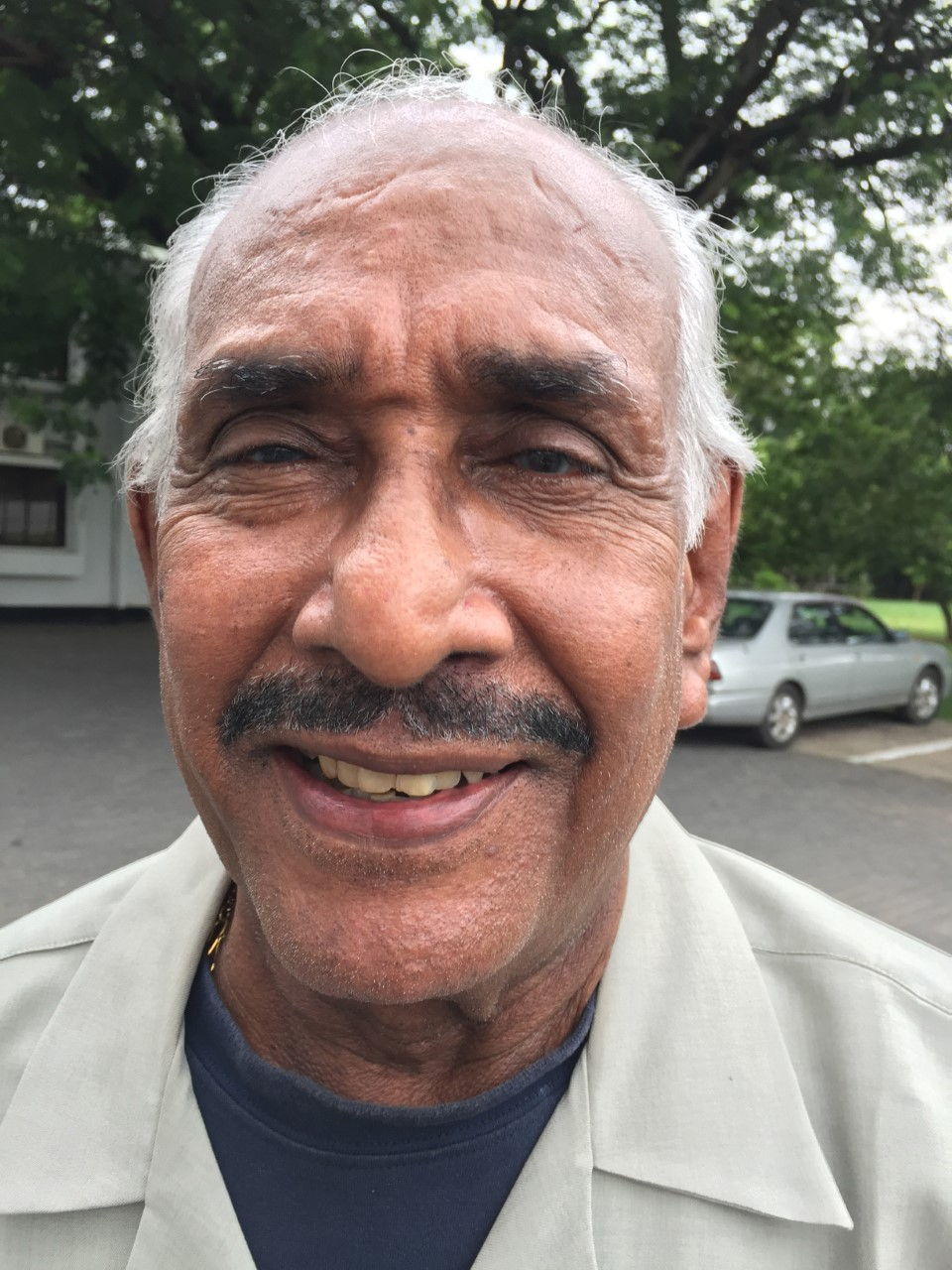
- Born: Rex Joseph Kodippili; 6 October 1938; Badulla, British Ceylon
- Died: 24 December 2023 (aged 85); Ja-Ela, Sri Lanka
- Other name: Rex
- Education: St. Bede's College; Sri Siddhartha Central College
- Occupations: Actor, producer, stuntman
- Years active: 1971-2023
- Spouse: Katherine Kodippili (m. 1986)
- Children: 3
- Awards: Best Supporting Actor; Best Actor in Negative role

Rex Joseph Kodippili (Sinhala:රෙක්ස් කොඩිප්පිලි; 6 October 1938 – 24 December 2023), was a Sri Lankan film actor and producer. Primarily acting as a villain for most of his career, Kodippili appeared in more than 130 films and produced two films. In 2019, he was honoured with Janabhimani Honorary Award at the Bandaranaike Memorial International Conference Hall.

== Personal life ==
Rex Joseph Kodippili was born on 6 October 1938 in Badulla, Sri Lanka as the youngest of the family. His father Don Henry Kodippili was a surveyor. His mother was Ethan Kodippili. His father died when he was 18 months old in a flood that occurred in Trincomalee district. Along with his two brothers, he was raised by his mother. He along with his two brothers completed education from St. Bede's College. Badulla. Though his brothers left the school early, Rex was boarded at the school. After Ordinary Level, he attended Sri Siddhartha Central College, Badulla.

After completing school life, he joined the police department. In 1958, he came to Colombo with the job. At the Apprentice Passing Out Ceremony, Rex finished second out of four hundred soldiers. He served for five years in the police department and departed in 1961. While in the military, he boxed, swam and was the leader of the first swimming team of the military police. Kodippili was a physical training instructor in the Military Police. He was then employed as a manager at the Marina Café and Hotel at Pettah, before becoming the manager at Salaka.

Kodippili was married to Katherine where he met on a marriage proposal. The couple had two daughters, Roshanthi and Sureka, and one son, Prasanna. His wife Katherine died in 2016.

Rex Kodippili died on 24 December 2023, at the age of 85.

== Acting career ==
According to him, he was much better at singing than acting. A gifted singer, he was popularly known as 'Badulla Mohideen Beg' in the Badulla area. He started singing when he was little, and also won second place in the grand final of the 'Adunika Peya' programme of the late 1950s radio commercial service where he received an award from the hands of the late prime minister S.W.R.D. Bandaranaike at the age of seven. He joined a drama circle named as "Rohana Dramatic Society" while at the Siddhartha College. They performed about five stage dramas including Maraka Daivaya and Sangeetha Pissa. After his five-year police service, he Joined the "Adunika Peya" of the Sri Lanka Broadcasting Corporation. In that competition, he won second place and Nanda Malini won first place. Then he got involved in programmes like Nevum Mihira as well as recording around five solo tracks.

While working at the Hotel Salaka, he became friends with Oswald Jayasinghe and Dommie Jayawardena. In 1969, while he was dropping Jayasinghe off at a film location in Nugegoda, the film's director, K. A. W. Perera, approached him and cast him in the role of a pick-pocket in the film Kathuru Muwath. In the meantime, he had the opportunity to do "double" roles in action scenes for the lead actors in movie fight scenes including stunt double for Senadheera Rupasinghe in the film Hathara Denama Soorayo. In 1972, he appeared in the film Lokuma Hinawa directed by K. A. W. During a stunt in the film, he broke his leg and was hospitalised for nine months.

However in 1973, he joined another stunt role in the film Aparadaya Saha Danduwama. In the film, Oswald Jayasinghe and Rex had a deadly fight where the scene was filmed on a big rock on Maligathenna hill. He fell to the ground with a quick blow from Oswald. As he was falling from the hill, he was lucky enough to hanging from a tree branch. The branch shattered into a pile of glass on the ground. Later, he was hospitalised with serious injuries and rested for three weeks. In the 1974 film Onna Babo Billo Enavo, he had a stunt scene where he climbed a helicopter with difficulty and fought with Gamini Fonseka. In the following years, he appeared in several action films such as Duppathage Hithawatha, Kalyani Ganga and Maruwa Samaga Wase.

In 1976, he made his first romantic role with the film Lassana Dawadak. Then he moved to more dramatic roles than action stunt roles. Some of his most notable character roles came through the characters such as: 'Kadira' in the film Muwan Pelessa, 'Daanu' in the film Raktha, 'Ratne Ayya' in the film Sagarika and 'Sergeant Silva' in the film Koti Waligaya. In 1987, he won the merit award at the 1987 Sarasaviya Awards for his performance in the film Koti Waligaya.

In 1982, he became a producer with the film Bicycale. In the film, he was also the screenwriter. The theme of the film is boxing, which had never been discussed in a movie. He acted in the teleplay titled Gini avi saha Gini keli which was aired on TV Derana.

=== Selected television serials ===
- Ahimi
- Charithayakata Paata Denna
- Deweni Inima
- Gauthami
- Gini Avi Saha Gini Keli
- Nadeeladiya
- Rala Bindena Thana
- Ran Kahawanu
- Samanalunta Wedithiyanna
- Wansakkarayo

== Filmography ==
Key
†	Denotes films that have not yet been released

=== As an actor ===
Year	Film	Role	Notes
1971	Kathuru Muwath		debut film appearance
1972	Ihatha Athmaya		
1972	Lokuma Hinawa		
1973	Hondai Narakai		
1973	Sunethra		
1973	Aparadaya Saha Danduwama		
1974	Duleeka		
1974	Rodie Gama		
1974	Sureka		
1974	Dinum Kanuwa		
1974	Onna Babo Billo Enawa		
1974	Sagarika		
1974	Duppathage Hithawatha	Lenin	
1975	Damayanthi		
1975	Lassana Kella		
1975	Chandani		
1975	Suraya Surayamai	Rex	
1975	Hitha Honda Minihek		
1975	Mage Nangi Shyama		
1976	Lassana Dawadak		first romantic role
1976	Kauda Raja		
1976	Adarei Mang Adarei		
1976	Diyamanthi		
1976	Nilla Soya	Disa Hamu	
1976	Uannath Dahai Malath Dahai		
1976	Hulawali	Second Maha Eka	
1976	Ran Thilaka		
1977	Hariyanakota Ohoma Thamai		
1977	Yakadaya	Police chief	
1977	Sakunthala		
1977	Maruwa Samaga Wase	Siemen Appu	
1977	Chin Chin Nona		
1977	Hithuwoth Hithuwamai		
1977	Niluka		
1977	Yali Epade		
1977	Chin Chin Nona		
1977	Honda Hitha		
1977	Yasoma		
1978	Chandi Shyama		
1978	Siripathula	King Nissankamalla	
1978	Asha Desin		
1978	Mage Ran Putha		
1978	Sara		
1978	Tikira	Lionel	
1978	Hithamithura		
1978	Deepanjali		
1978	Seetha Devi	Kamal aka Kumbakarna	
1979	Sugandi		
1979	Hari Pudumai	Janthuwa	
1979	Rosa Mal Thunak		
1979	Minisun Athara Minisek		
1979	Wisihathara Peya	Thomson Mudalali	
1979	Monarathenna	King	
1979	Geheniyak		
1979	Samanmalee	Lawyer	
1979	Muwan Pelessa		
1980	Raktha	Daanu	
1980	Mal Kekulu	Mahinda	
1980	Uthumaneni		
1980	Seetha		
1980	Sankapali	Village head	
1980	Mage Amma		
1980	Muwan Pelessa-2	Kadira	fought with a live sloth bear in one of the scenes
1981	Chanchala Reka		
1981	Jeewanthi		
1981	Ranga		
1981	Thavalama		
1982	Eka Diga Kathawak		
1982	Sudu Ayya		
1982	Bicykaley	Kalu mahaththaya	
1983	Sister Mary		
1983	Hithath Hondai Wedath Hondai		
1983	Chandi Sriya		
1983	Chandira	Sakkara Mama	
1984	Namal Renu		
1984	Rana Derana	Nikapitiye Bandara	
1984	Sasara Chethana		
1984	Thaththai Puthai	Saliya's father	
1985	Kiri Madu Wel		
1985	Araliya Mal	Police Inspector	
1985	Suradhuthiyo		
1985	Channai Kello Dennai		
1986	Koti Waligaya	Sargent Silva	
1986	Peralikarayo		
1987	Ahinsa		
1987	Kavuluwa		
1987	Raja Wedakarayo		
1987	Hitha Honda Chandiya		
1988	Satana		
1988	Sathutai Kurula Ape		
1989	Mamai Raja		
1990	Christhu Charithaya	Pontius Pilath	
1990	Veera Udara		
1990	Thanha Asha	Sydney	
1990	Wana Bambara		
1990	Hitha Honda Puthek		
1991	Salambak Handai		
1991	Raja Sellam		
1991	Uthura Dakuna	Rex de Silva	
1992	Rumathiyai Neethiyai		
1992	Ahimi Dadaman		
1992	Kadira		
1992	Sinhayageth Sinhaya		
1993	Jeevan Malli		
1993	Weli Sulanga		
1994	Nohandan Kumariye		
1994	Raja Wansen Ekek	Wilson	
1994	Nomiyena Minisun		
1994	Ahas Maliga		
1996	Sebe Mithura		
1996	Loku Duwa		
1996	Soora Daruwo		
1996	Bawa Sasara		
1996	Obatai Me Aradhana		
1997	Soorayo Wedakarayo		
1997	Apaye Thathpara Asu Haradahak		
1997	Rathtaran Minihek		
1997	Puthuni Mata Wasana	Doctor Perera	
1998	Dorakasa Marawa		
1999	Kolompoor	guest appearance	
2000	Anuragaye Ananthaya		
2000	Kauda Bole Alice	Nelson Fernando	
2001	Oba Koheda Priye	Madanayake	
2001	Pissu Puso	Mahanama	
2002	Somy Boys	Rex Mahaththaya	
2002	Pissu Double	Danapala	
2003	Pissu Trible	Police Inspector	
2003	Sonduru Dadabima	Police OIC	
2004	Underworld		
2004	Ohoma Harida	Gajasinghe Mudalali	
2004	Katawath Kiyannepa		
2004	Sumedha		
2005	Mata Thama Mathakai		
2005	One Shot	Minister Sallala Arachchi	
2005	Sanduni		
2006	Naga Kanya		
2006	Eka Malaka Pethi	Mahela's father	
2006	Anjalika	Kavya's father	
2007	Wada Bari Tarzan	Treasure hunter	
2007	Jundai Gundai		
2007	James Bond		
2008	Heart FM	Child specialist doctor	
2008	Superstar	Jayawardana	
2008	Rosa Diganthe		
2009	Ali Surathal	Mr. Senarathna	
2009	Juliya		
2009	Thushara remake	Sonia's father	
2010	Suwanda Denuna Jeewithe	Ayeshmantha's father	
2010	Jaya Pita Jaya	IP Saliya	
2011	Kiwwada Nahi Nokiwwada Nahi		
2011	Nidi Yahana Kelabei		
2011	Mahindagamanaya		
2012	Sakvithi Dadayama	Cyril	
2014	Ranja	OIC. guest appearance	
2015	Maharaja Ajasath	Purohitha	
2017	Devani Warama	Wickrama Karaliyadde	
2017	Dr. Nawariyan	Mr. Senanayake	
2018	Yama Raja Siri	Nilnayani's father	
2020	Ethalaya		
2023	Meka Puduma Kathawak		
TBA	Marukathara †		
TBA	Breaking News †		
TBA	Divorce †		
TBA	Rainbow †		
TBA	Black Male †		
TBA	Hamlet †	Post production.	
TBA	Bambara Wasanthe †		

=== As a producer ===
Year	Film	Notes
1974	Sihasuna	
1982	Bycikalaya	
