= Sando Harris =

Sri Lankan actor (1953–2021)

Sando Harris සැන්ඩෝ හැරිස්
- Born: 18 May 1963; Wellawatte, Sri Lanka
- Died: 11 June 2021 (aged 58); Colombo, Sri Lanka
- Education: Isipathana College; Zahira College, Colombo
- Occupations: Actor, singer, comedian, theatre director, stunt director
- Years active: 1988–2021
- Children: 3

Sando Harris (18 May 1963 – 11 June 2021; Sinhala: සැන්ඩෝ හැරිස්), popularly known by his stage names Sando Harris and Sergeant Nallathambi, was an actor in Sri Lankan cinema, theater, and television. With a career spanned more than three decades, Sando was a popular comedian in theater and cinema. Apart from comedy acting, he was also a stunt actor, producer, director and singer.

== Personal life ==
He was born on 18 May 1963 in Kirulapone, Sri Lanka to a family of eight. He received his primary education at Arethusa College, Wellawatte, and secondary education from Isipathana College and Zahira College, Colombo.

He died on 11 June 2021 at the age of 58. The cause is identified as a sudden cardiac arrest occurred when he was at his friend's residence in No. 291/47, Havelock Place, Colombo. After the post mortem at Kalubowila Hospital, the body was taken to the Dehiwala cemetery and the last rites was performed on 13 June 2021.

== Career ==
Sando entered the drama in association with Kirulapone when in the company of renowned comedian Nihal Silva. With Nihal's death, he took the role that Nihal created 'Sergeant Nallathambi' and later created a new stage play called Cheriyo Sergeant. The play staged more than 2500 scenes island-wide as well as in 23 countries.

He made his film debut in 1990 film Jayashakthi. Since then he has acted with many supporting and minor roles in more than 150 films including: Hitha Honda Putek, Ran Hadawatha, Raja Daruvō, Sathyā, Ekadā Væhi, Demōdara Pālama and Quē Serā. In 1997 he won the Best Actor Award for Wedage Kendare. Although he entered the film industry as a stuntman, he was also involved in stunt direction as well His first stunt direction came through the 1999 film Ekadā Væhi. He later directed stunts in the film Seethala Gini Kandu. He also made a supporting role in the 2013 critics acclaimed film A Common Man directed by Chandran Rutnam. In 2015 he won SriLankan 1st award best actor in comedy role award in Derana films award for "que sera" movie.the movie directed by Late Mr.Parakkrama Jayasinghe.

In television, he acted in the serials: Yuga Vilakkuwa. However, he became popular as a comedian shortly afterwards. He produced many comedy stage plays with the role 'Nallathambi' such as: Sergeanṭgē Nændammā, Doctor Chicāgō and Kōchchi Manamālayā. The play Doctor Chicago continued for about three years. In 2015, He won the best comedy actor award for the first time in Sri Lankan film festivals at the Derana Film Awards for the film Que Sera. Since 2017, he worked on his debut direction King of Diyawannawa which could not complete due to his demise.

In addition to acting, he also served as a Justice of the Peace.

== Filmography ==
Year	Film	Roles	Ref.
1990	Jaya Skakthi		
1991	Raja Sellan		
1992	Sathya		
1992	Sinhayangeth Sinhaya	Alex	
1992	Rajek Wage Puthek		
1993	Trishule		
1993	Juriya Mamai	Stunt Coordinator	
1994	Ekada Wahi		
1994	Sandamadala	Stunt Coordinator	
1995	Wasana Wewa	Stunt Coordinator	
1995	Vijay Saha Ajay	Henchman	
1995	Demodara Palama	Pissing henchman	
1995	Aege Vairaya	Stunt Coordinator, Smuggler	
1995	Hitha Honda Surayo		
1996	Sathi	Stunt Coordinator	
1996	Pem Mal Mala		
1997	Ninja Sri Lanka		
1998	Gini Avi Saha Gini Keli	Sergeant Nallathambi	
1998	Yudha Gini Meda	Stunt Coordinator, Tyaagu	
1999	Unusum Rathriya	Bonnie	
1999	Koti Sana	Stunt Coordinator	
2001	Hai Baby Hai	Henchman	
2001	Wasanthaye Kunatuwak	Stunt Coordinator	
2002	Seethala Gini Kandu	Stunt Coordinator	
2002	Somy Boys	Doctor Chicago	
2004	Left Right Sir	Ronnie	
2005	Mata Thawa Mathakai	Guruthuma	
2008	Machan	Hotel Guard	
2011	Putha Mage Suraya		
2013	A Common Man	D. Gopinath	
2014	Que Sera	James	
2015	Singa Machan Charlie	Sergeant Rivilsan	
2019	Thiththa Aththa		
2019	President Super Star	Film director	
2022	The Game	Tiger	
