= Somy Boys =

Somy Boys සොමි බෝයිස්
- Directed by: A. A. Junaideen
- Written by: A. A. Junaideen
- Produced by: Super Hits Films Private Limited
- Starring: Bandu Samarasinghe; Tennyson Cooray; Sanath Gunathilake; Rex Kodippili
- Cinematography: M. H. Gafoor
- Edited by: Kumarasiri de Silva
- Music by: Somapala Rathnayake
- Production company: Super Hits Films Pvt. Ltd
- Distributed by: Movie Producers & Importers Co (Pvt) Ltd
- Release date: 6 December 2002
- Running time: 120 minutes
- Country: Sri Lanka
- Language: Sinhala
- Budget: 10 Million
- Box office: 11 Million

Somy Boys (Sinhala: සොමි බෝයිස්) is a 2002 Sri Lankan Sinhala comedy family film directed by A. A. Junaideen and co-produced by N. Udaya Kumar, V. Anthony Raja, P. Arooran and J. S. Ravi Fernando for Super Hits Films Private Limited. It stars comic duo Bandu Samarasinghe, and Tennyson Cooray in lead roles along with Sanath Gunathilake, Rex Kodippili and Rajitha Hiran. Music for the film was by Somapala Rathnayake. The film became one of Sri Lanka's blockbuster movies with reaching more than 150 days in cinema theaters. It is the 995th Sri Lankan film in the Sinhala cinema.

== Plot ==
Rex, Bandusena and Sanath are businessmen living in hill country of Sri Lanka. Quarreling over money Rex accidentally kills Bandusena and he pretends Sanath did the murder. But Sanath's servant, Dadin Bidin sees the actual scene. Rex keeps asking for ransom from Bandusena telling he will reveal the murder.

Meanwhile, Bin (Tennison Kooray) and Bush (Bandu Samarasinghe) are youngsters who have left their homes to find jobs. They become friends with Sanath's servant (Rajitha Hiran) on their way and they run into many hilarious incidents.

Later truth about the murder is revealed and Sanath marries Bin's sister. Bush reveals that he is the son of the Bandusena. As Dadin Bidin complains the police about the actual murder, Police takes Rex.

Finally Bin and Bush marry alongside Sanath at his wedding.

== Cast ==
- Bandu Samarasinghe as Bush / Bandusena Mudalali
- Tennyson Cooray as Bean
- Sanath Gunathilake as Sanath
- Rex Kodippili as Rex
- Rajitha Hiran as Dadin Bidin
- Sunil Hettiarachchi as WWW Sugathapala, Bean's father
- Berty Gunathilake as Punyadasa
- Janesh Silva as Banda
- Sando Harris as Doctor Chicago
- Damitha Saluwadana as Bean's mother
- M. V. Balan as Factory manager
- Chathura Perera as Pinto
- Premadasa Vithanage as 100 year seeker
- Teddy Vidyalankara as Teddy
- Tyrone Michael as Michael
- Sunil Bamunuarachchi as Wedding fighter
- Raju Gamage as Wedding fighter

== Songs ==
No.	Title	Singer(s)	Length
1.	"Ma Adure Thaniwi Sitina"	Gratien Ananda, Uresha Ravihari
2.	"Nawa Gilunath Ban Chun"	Gratien Ananda, Sangeeth Wickramasinghe, Kalawathi, Suriya Kumar Muththalage
3.	"Aala Pane Ape Wade"	Gratien Ananda, Sangeeth Wickramasinghe, Kalawathi, Lelum Rathnayake
