= Udari Perera =

Sri Lankan Actress and model

- උදාරි පෙරේරා
- Born: 23 April 1984 (age 42)
- Education: St. Anne's Balika Maha Vidyalaya
- Occupations: Actress, Model
- Years active: 2007-Present
- Notable work: Pravegaya
- Spouse: Prasad Ranasinghe
- Children: 1
- Relatives: Shehani Perera (sister)
- Awards: Mrs. Sri Lanka (2016)

K. P. Shashika Udari Perera (born 23 April 1984) (Sinhala: උදාරි පෙරේරා), popularly known as Udari Perera, is a Sri Lankan film actress and model. In 2016, she won the title Mrs. Sri Lanka and subsequently participated in the Mrs. Universe pageant.

== Personal life ==
Udari has two younger sisters – Purnima and Shehani. She is married to Prasad Ranasinghe and the couple has one son, Jaydon. Purnima Perera is an air hostess. Her younger sister Shehani Perera is an actress who played the lead roles in two films Face to Pace and Ethalaya. Udari completed education from St. Anne's Balika Maha Vidyalaya, Wattala.

She worked as an air hostess before entering cinema.

== Mrs Universe 2016 ==
In 2016 Udari won the title of Mrs. Sri Lanka, at the national Mrs. Universe pageant held on 17 August 2016 at Ramada Hotel, Colombo and represented the country at the Mrs. Universe pageant in Guangzhou, China on 23 August 2016.

== Career ==
She is best known for her appearance in Ran Ran Ran Sela Anda of Iraj and Sangeeth's music video in 2007. She debuted acting in the television serial Sinindu Piyapath with a minor role. Her film debut was in Pravegaya, which was released in 2015 opposite to Hemal Ranasinghe.

== Filmography ==
Year	Film	Role	Ref.
2015	Pravegaya	Udari	
2018	Seya	Nirasha	
2018	Nela	Sundari	
2018	Bimba Devi Alias Yashodhara	Princess Nanda	
2020	Miss Jenis	Nimaya	
TBA	Paada Yathra †		
TBA	Yathra †		

=== Television serials ===
- Sinindu Piyapath as Saroja
- Iththo

== Awards ==
- Hiru Golden Film Awards - Most Popular Actress - 2016
