= Kota Uda Express =

- Official poster
- Sinhala: කොට උඩ එක්ස්ප්‍රස්
- Directed by: A.A Junaideen
- Written by: A.A Junaideen
- Produced by: Bright Films
- Starring: Tennyson Cooray; Dilhani Ekanayake
- Cinematography: G. Nandasena
- Edited by: M.S Aliman
- Music by: Sarath Dassanayake
- Release date: 31 March 2017
- Country: Sri Lanka
- Language: Sinhala

Kota Uda Express is a 2017 Sri Lankan comedy film directed by A.A Junaideen and produced by Bright Films. The film stars Tennyson Cooray and Dilhani Ekanayake in lead roles along with Dayasiri Hettiarachchi, Ananda Athukorale in supportive roles. The film screened on 31 March 2017, without a prior media publicity, as said by the director. It is the 1272nd Sri Lankan film in the Sinhala cinema.

== Cast ==
- Tennyson Cooray as Weere
- Dilhani Ekanayake as Pabawathi
- Dayasiri Hettiarachchi as Buddadhasa
- Ananda Athukorale as Sadiris
- Harith Wasala as Raja
- Gamini Mendis
- Giriraj Kaushalya
- Nayomi Thakshila as Susila
- Renuka Mayadunne
- Abinav AK

== Songs ==
No.	Title	Lyrics	Singer(s)	Length
1.	"Pissu Wikare"	Chandradasa Fernando	Sangeeth Wickramasinghe
2.	"Amma Mage"		Chandrika Siriwardena
