= Thank You Berty =

- Film poster
- Sinhala: තෑන්ක් යු බර්ටි
- Directed by: Tennyson Cooray
- Written by: Tennyson Cooray
- Produced by: Jagath M. Yapa
- Starring: Tennyson Cooray; Bandu Samarasinghe; Anusha Damayanthi; Dilhani Ekanayake; Ananda Wickramage; Anton Jude
- Cinematography: Lalith Thomas; Nimalsiri Rosa
- Edited by: Prasad Lad, Chennai
- Music by: Somapala Rathnayake
- Production company: Galuku Entertainment
- Distributed by: EAP Films
- Release dates: August 7, 2010 (Australia); November 25, 2011 (Sri Lanka)
- Running time: 120 minutes
- Country: Sri Lanka
- Language: Sinhalese

Thank You Berty (Sinhala: තෑන්ක් යු බර්ටි) is a 2010 Sinhalese language Sri Lankan action comedy film written by Tennyson Cooray as his directorial debut and starring a number of Sri Lankan comedians, including Bandu Samarasinghe, Dilhani Ekanayake, Ananda Wickramage, Mahendra Perera, Anusha Damayanthi, Nilanthi Dias, and Cletus Mendis. The film had its world premiere August 7, 2010, in Melbourne, Australia.

== Plot ==
The life of Berty, the middle aged bachelor, changes when he meets Sanda, a nursery school teacher, who hails from a very rich family. He falls madly in love with her, and Berty’s attempt to actualize this one sided love is the plot to the play.

Berty’s best friend, Norty, is married to Matilda. Being a father of nine children, Norty always attempts to make easy money. When Berty confides his secret love, the latter advises him to get rich to win the girls heart and invites him to join him in the journey of making quick and easy money.

Berty and Norty in their journey to make easy money brings fits of laughter during the incidents they encounters.

== Cast ==
- Tennyson Cooray as Birty
- Bandu Samarasinghe as Norty
- Dilhani Ekanayake as Harry's Daughter
- Anton Jude as Minister
- Ananda Wickramage as Mr. Harry
- Mahendra Perera as William Silancer, Sanda's Father
- Nilanthi Dias as Sandakomali
- Ronnie Leitch as Munidasa, Driver of Sanda's Father
- Priyankara Perera as Norty's Student
- Susila Kottage as Berty's Mother
- Anusha Damayanthi as Matilda, Norty's Wife
- Cletus Mendis as Police Inspector
- Manel Wanaguru as Opal
- Wimal Kumara de Costa as Security officer
- Ariyasena Gamage as Solbari
- Samanthi Lanerolle as Tamil servant
- Susila Kuragama as Kuri
- Premadasa Vithanage as Opal's Husband
- Rajitha Hiran
- Jeevan Handuneththi
- Mahinda Pathirage as SMS Reality show promoter
- Don Guy as Police Officer
- Teddy Vidyalankara
- Janesh de Silva as Police Constable
- Chathura Perera as Police Constable
- Kapila Sigera as Chandana, Silancer's servant

== Tracklisting ==
Composed by Somapala Rathnayake. Singers are Sangeeth Wijesuriya and Uresha Ravihari.

1. Chuttan Battichchi - Sangeeth Wijesuriya, Uresha Ravihari
