= Bimba Devi Alias Yashodhara =

Bimba Devi alias Yashodhara
- Promotional image for Bimba Devi alias Yashodhara
- Sinhala: බිම්බා දේවී හෙවත් යශෝධරා
- Directed by: Sunil Ariyaratne
- Written by: Sunil Ariyaratne
- Produced by: H. D. Premasiri
- Starring: Pallavi Subhash; Arpit Choudhary; Dineth De Silva; Sangeetha Thedani
- Cinematography: Channa Deshapriya
- Edited by: Rukmal Nirosh
- Music by: Rohana Weerasinghe
- Production company: Sarasavi Studios
- Distributed by: EAP Films; MPI Circuit; Rithma Films; CEL Circuit; LFD Circuit
- Release date: 26 April 2018
- Running time: 148 minutes
- Country: Sri Lanka
- Language: Sinhala

Bimba Devi alias Yashodhara (බිම්බා දේවී හෙවත් යශෝධරා) is a 2018 Sri Lankan Sinhala language epic, biographical drama film written and directed by professor Sunil Ariyaratne. This historical biographical film depicts the life of princess Yashodhara, the wife of Prince Siddhartha. It is the 1304th Sri Lankan film in the Sinhalese cinema.

The film stars Indian actress Pallavi Subhash (who is making her Sinhala language debut in the film) and Indian actor Arpit Choudhary in the lead roles. Other supporting crew includes Sri Lankan actors Dineth De Silva, Sangeetha Thedani, Ajith Weerasinghe, Udari Perera, and Kamal Deshapriya. This is directed by Sri Lankan film director Sunil Ariyaratne‍.

The filming of the movie took place at Ranmihithenna Telecinema Park, Sri Lanka. The film was released on 26 April 2018, simultaneously with upcoming Vesak festival. The film screened 74 theaters worldwide and passed 100 days successfully. Screening of the film ended on 9 August.

== Cast ==
- Pallavi Subhash as Princess Yashodhara (Voice by Ferni Roshini)
- Arpit Choudhary as Prince Siddhartha (Voice by Bimal Jayakody)
- Dineth De Silva as Devadatta
- Sangeetha Thedani as Mahapajapati Gotami
- Ajith Weerasinghe as King Shuddhodana
- Udari Perera as Princess Nanda
- Heshan Manula as Prince Nanda
- Shammu Kasun as Channa
- Kamal Deshapriya as King Suprabuddha
- Thumindu Dodantenna as Poet
- Ruvi Lakmali as Radhita
- Nethsuka Muluthenrala as Rahula
- Wilson Gunaratne as Asita
- Anasta Gray as Uttara
- Jayarathne Galagedara as Naimanthika
- Isura Nissanka as Kokalika

== Production ==
=== Development ===
Following the commercial success of director Sunil Ariyaratne's film Paththini (2016) starring Pooja Umashankar, Sunil Ariyarathne announced his next production. The film became the first Sri Lankan film to be screened in Singapore when it was released in Carnival Cinema Theatre, Singapore on 2 June 2018.
