= Kolompoor =

Kolompoor කොළොම්පූර්
- Directed by: Dinesh Priyasad
- Written by: Tennyson Cooray
- Produced by: Lalindra Films
- Starring: Bandu Samarasinghe; Tennyson Cooray; Freddie Silva; Dilhani Ekanayake
- Cinematography: Nimalasiri Rosa; Dinesh Priyasad
- Edited by: Dinesh Priyasad
- Music by: Somapala Rathnayake
- Production companies: Dil Forces International; Sarasavi Studio
- Release date: 20 August 1999
- Running time: 143 minutes
- Country: Sri Lanka
- Language: Sinhala

Kolompoor (Sinhala: කොළොම්පූර්) is a 1999 Sri Lankan Sinhala comedy, family film directed by Dinesh Priyasad and produced by Lalindra Wijewickrama for Lalindra Films. It stars comic duo Bandu Samarasinghe, and Tennyson Cooray in lead roles along with Dilhani Ekanayake, Freddie Silva and Tony Ranasinghe. Music for the film is done by Somapala Rathnayake. The film became one of Sri Lanka's blockbuster movies with reaching more than 150 days in cinema theatres. It is the 919th Sri Lankan film in the Sinhala cinema.

== Cast ==
- Bandu Samarasinghe as S.P Liyanagedara Bandu
- Tennyson Cooray as Thadawansa and 6 others. (kadukkama, minister, businessman, tamilan, farmer, homosexual boy)
- Freddie Silva as Freddie
- Tony Ranasinghe as Alpabet Danthanarayana
- Harsha Jayawardena as Pooja
- Dilhani Ekanayake as Tanisha
- Wimal Kumara de Costa as Costapal
- Sunil Hettiarachchi as I.Opatha
- Teddy Vidyalankara as Brando
- Robin Fernando as Detective
- Piyadasa Wijekoon as Lorry Munna
- Somapala Rathnayake as Poosari

== Soundtrack ==
No.	Title	Singer(s)	Length
1.	"Kohen Kohoma Hari"	Walter Fernando, Freddie Silva
2.	"Nelum Manel Made Pipila"	Latha Walpola
3.	"tipi Tipi Tinti Tipin"	Derick de Silva
4.	"Mama Wettukaraya"	Walter Fernando
5.	"Ambanaka Guti Kala"	Walter Fernando, Maurice Dahanayake, Ananda Perera, Freddie Silva, Sunil Hettiarachchi, Latha Walpola

== Distribution ==
The film successfully screened in 15 cinemas from its distribution date in Colombo. It was screened more than 150 days in three cinemas.
