= Chandani Seneviratne =

Sri Lankan actress (born 1962)

- චාන්දනී සෙනෙවිරත්න
- Born: 28 December 1962 (age 63); Boralesgamuwa
- Occupations: Actress, Presenter
- Years active: 1979–present
- Website: www.chandanisenevirathne.com

Chandani Seneviratne (born 28 December 1962: Sinhala: චාන්දනී සෙනෙවිරත්න) is an actress in Sri Lankan cinema, theatre and television.

== Early days ==
Seneviratne studied at Dharmapala Vidyalaya, Pannipitiya till grade 5 and St. Paul's Girls School, Milagiriya till her higher studies. She started her acting career as a Theatre Artist and made her film debut in Sathi Puja in 1985, for which she won the Presidential Award for best supporting Actress.

== Awards ==
She is the recipient of a Dubai International Film Award, a Presidential Award, a Sarasaviya Award, a Lanka Live Award and a Hiru Golden Film Award.

== Filmography ==
Key
†	Denotes films that have not yet been released

Year	Film	Role	Ref.
1984	Sathi Pooja	Suneetha	
1990	Saharave Sihinaya		
1991	Sthree		
1992	Sisila Gini Gani	Nun	
1996	Amanthaya	Ramani	
1998	Julietge Bhumikawa	Psychologist	
1999	Theertha Yathra		
2005	Sulanga	Margaret	
2006	Udugan Yamaya	Sirimal's mother	
2006	Sewwandi	Lalitha	
2007	Aganthukaya	Sampath's wife	
2007	Uppalawanna	Rathnapala's mother	
2008	Heart FM	Shakya's mother	
2008	Nil Diya Yahana	Shehara's mother	
2009	Ekamath Eka Rateka	Housemaid	
2009	Ira Handa Yata	Sachitra	
2010	Vidhu	Vidhu's mother	
2012	Kusa Pabha	Kudi	
2013	Siri Parakum	Dhobi mother	
2013	Nikini Vassa	Somalatha	
2015	Mage Yalu Malu	Sukiri's granny	
2015	Bora Diya Pokuna	Piyasili	
2017	Nino Live	Nimmi	
2017	A Level	Lady lawyer	
2018	Davena Vihagun	Sumana	
2018	Goal	Mrs. Samarasekara	
2019	Thaala		
2022	CineMa		
2022	Ran Kolla	Gnanawathi	
2023	Aasu		
2023	Kandak Sema		
2024	Minnu		
2024	Mandara	Mandara's mother	
2025	Tentigo	Kamala	
TBA	Sewanali †		
TBA	Suvisi Vivarana †		
TBA	Father †		

=== Selected Television series ===
- Akala Sandya
- Appachchi
- Bedde Kulawamiya
- Chess
- Doo Daruwo
- Kaluwara Gedara
- Maha Polowa
- Niranandaya
- One Way
- Pithru
- Piyasa
- Sahodaraya
- Sulanga Matha Mohothak
- Susum Rasthiyaduwa
- Take Care (Sri Lankan TV series)
- Thakshalawa
- Thara
- Weda Hamine
- Yakada Pahan Thira
- Genu Pirimi Mal Palathuru

== Awards and honors ==
=== Films ===
- Dubai International Film Festival - Jury's Special Mention of the Best Actress Award - Nikini Wessa (2012)
- Presidential Award for the Best Supporting Actress - Sathi Puja (1984)
- Sarasaviya Award for the Best Actress - Udu Gan Yamaya (2006)
- SIGNIS Gold award for Creative Acting (Female) - Udu Gan Yamaya (2006)
- Presidential Award for the Best Supporting Actress - Sulanga (2006)
- SIGNIS Special Merit Award - Sulanga (2006)
- Sarasaviya Award for the Best Supporting Actress - Uppalawanna (2007)
- Lanka Live Award for Best Actress - Nikini Wessa (2012)
- Hiru Golden Film Award for Best Actress - Nikini Wessa (2012)
- SIGNIS Award for Creative Performance (Female): Silver Award - Nikini Wassa (2012)
- SIGNIS Award for Most Creative Supporting Actress - Kusa Paba (2013)

=== Raigam Tele'es ===
Year	Nominee / work	Award	Result
2005	Punchi Rala	Best Actress	Won
2006	Jeewithayata Idadenna	Best Actress	Won
2007	Sulan Seenu	Best Director - Single Episode	Won
2008	Rala Bindena Thena	Best Actress	Won
2011	Thaksalawa	Best Supporting Actress	Won
2015	Chess	Best Actress	Won
2017	One Way	Best Supporting Actress	Won
2019	Sahodaraya	Best Actress	Won

=== Sumathi Awards ===
Year	Nominee / work	Award	Result
1996	Kasthirama	Best Actress	Won
1996	Sankranthi Samaya	Popular Actress	Won
1999	Nisala Wila	Best Actress	Won
2007	Sulan Seenu	Best Director - Single Episode	Won
2008	Rala Bindena Thena	Best Actress	Won
2011	Thaksalawa	Best Supporting Actress	Won
2021	Weera Gedara Ewith	Best Supporting Actress	Won

=== SIGNIS Awards ===
Year	Nominee / work	Award	Result
2006	Theth saha Viyali	Best Actress	Won
2008	Karuwala Gedara	Best Actress	Won
2009	Arungal	Best Actress	Won
2015	Chess	Best Actress	Won
2018	Bedde Kulawamiya	Best Supporting Actress	Won
