= Sumathi Best Teledrama Actress Award =

The Sumathi Best Teledrama Actress Award is presented annually in Sri Lanka by the Sumathi Group of Companies, in association with numerous commercial brands, to honor the best Sri Lankan actress in television of the year.

The award was first presented in 1995. Below is a list of winners of this prestigious title since then.

== Award winners ==
Year	Best Actress	Teledrama	Ref.
1995	Manel Jayasena	Eka gei Kurullo	
1996	Chandani Seneviratne	Kasthirama	
1997	Malani Fonseka	Pitagamkarayo	
1998	Vasanthi Chathurani	Durganthaya	
1999	Chandani Seneviratne	Nisala Wila	
2000	Nilmini Tennakoon	Isidasi	
2001	Malani Fonseka	Kemmura	
2002	Vasanthi Chathurani	Kulawamiya	
2003	Sasanthi Jayasekara	Hada Wila Sakmana	
2004	Duleeka Marapana	Depath Nai	
2005	Duleeka Marapana	Hima Katayam	
2006	Damitha Abeyratne	Keli Mandala	
2007	Chandani Seneviratne	Rala Bindena Thana	
2008	Vasanthi Chathurani	Sathgunakaraya	
2009	Duleeka Marapana	Ridee Ittankaraya	
2010	Himali Sayurangi	Thaksalawa	
2011	Samadhi Laksiri	Kadadora	
2012	Kanchana Mendis	Me Wasantha Kalayay	
2013	Paboda Sandeepani	Boralu Para	
2014	Thisuri Yuwanika	Sulanga Matha Mohothak	
2015	Nilmini Tennakoon	Amma	
2016	Umali Thilakarathne	Boheemiyamuwa	
2017	Nadhi Kammellaweera	Badde Kulawamiya	
2018	Thisuri Yuwanika	Minigandela	
2019	Samanalee Fonseka	Ado	
2020	Udari Warnakulasooriya	Sansararanya Asabada	
2021	Umali Thilakarathne	Sakarma	
2022	Nayomi Thakshila	Andungira	
2023	Semini Iddamalgoda	Eya Dan Bandala	
