= Marianela (novel) =

1878 novel by Benito Pérez Galdós

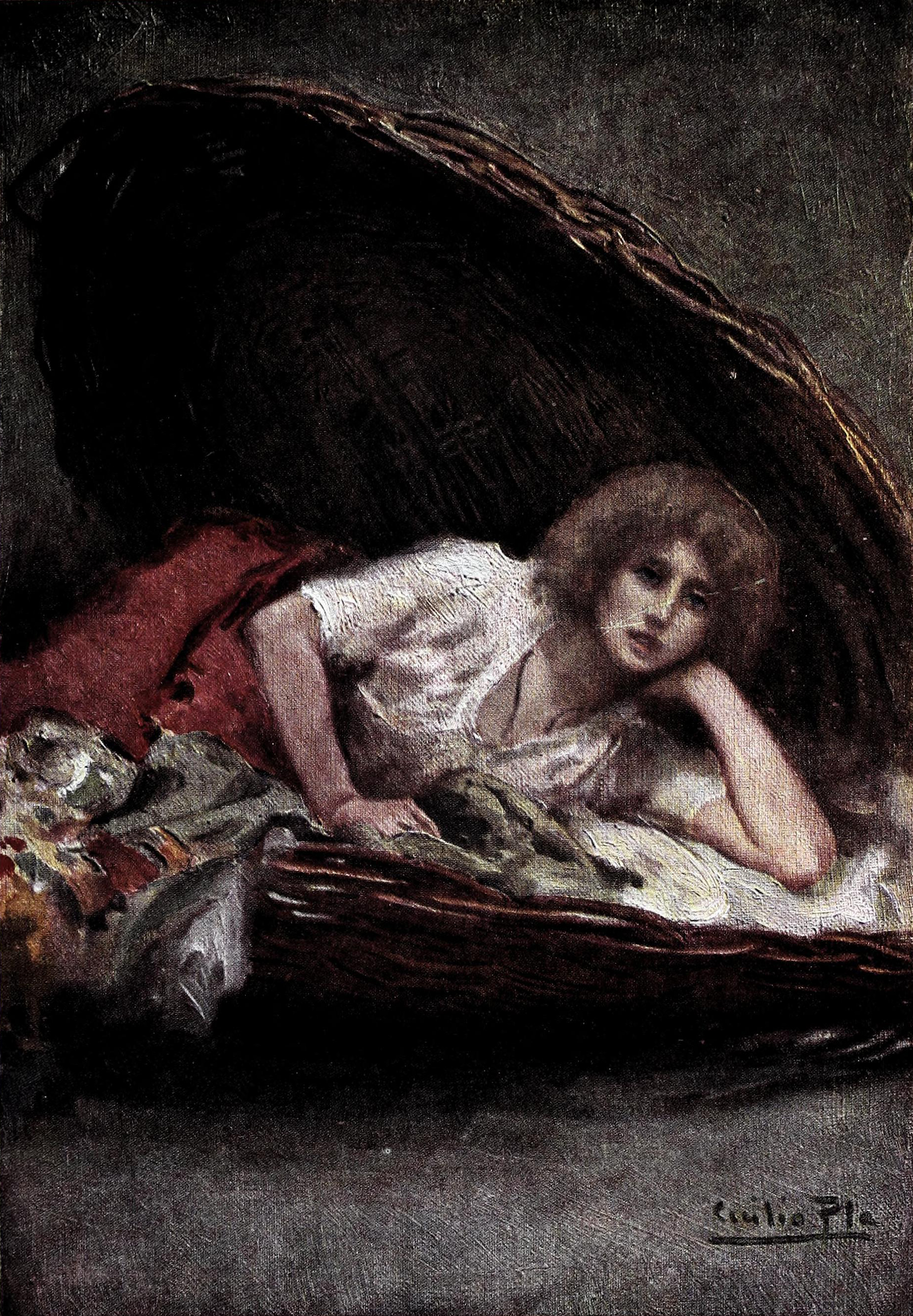
"Marianela" by Cecilio Pla.

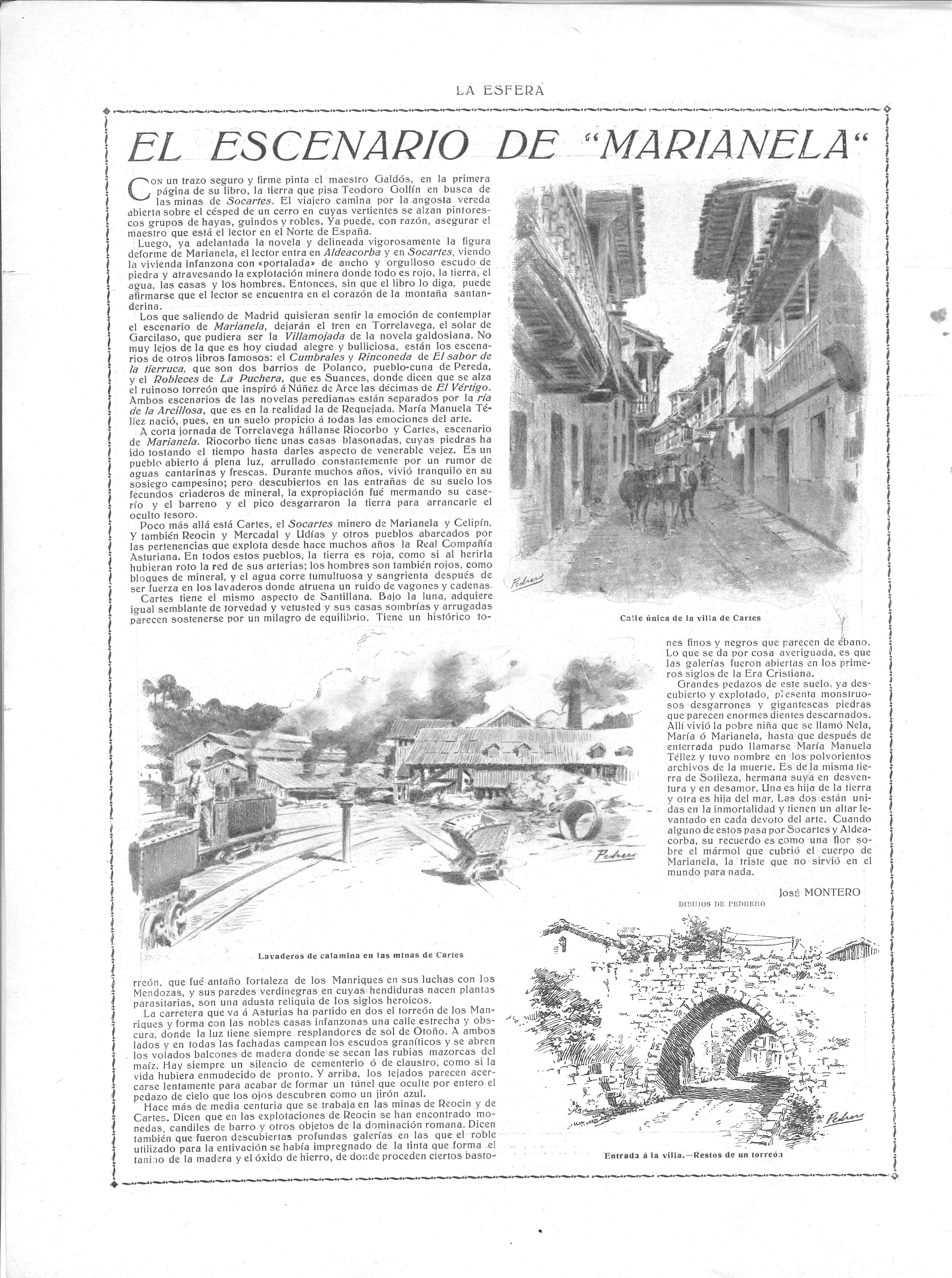
Article in Spanish by José Montero about Cartes and other mining locations that inspired the novel. Illustrations by Mariano Pedrero.

Marianela is a Spanish novel written by Benito Pérez Galdós in 1878. Several secondary characters appear in the novella that would become protagonists in his later novel cycle, Novelas españolas contemporáneas (Contemporary Spanish Novels).

== Plot ==
The novel takes place in the fictional town of Socartes, Spain. The town's name refers to the philosopher Socrates, and his ideas about internal and external beauty. It tells the story of Marianela (sometimes referred to as "Nela"), a poor orphan girl with an ugly face, and her love for Pablo, a blind boy, who also has romantic feelings towards Nela. Marianela frequently sings to Pablo, and he believes she is beautiful because of her voice and wild yet intelligible imagination.

Pablo's father asks a famous doctor, Teodoro Golfín, to examine Pablo to determine if his sight can be obtained. Pablo, full of hope at the prospect, promises Nela that he will marry her after the operation, if successful. He is convinced that Nela is beautiful, even when she tells him otherwise. In the meantime, Pablo's father plans for Pablo to marry his beautiful cousin, Florentina, but tells neither of them about it. Florentina comes to Socartes, and when Marianela first sees her, she mistakes her for the Virgin Mary because of her beauty. When Florentina is out walking with Pablo and Marianela, she expresses her pity for Nela because she is poor, abandoned and nobody loves her. She vows to take charge of Nela and clothe and educate her, and have Marianela live with her like a sister.

Pablo eventually gets the operation that gives him his sight. Before seeing Nela, he sees Florentina and assumes she was Nela but was corrected. He is completely entranced by Florentina's beauty and occasionally asks for Nela. Nela attempts suicide because she knows that now she is of no use, since Pablo has the ability to see and differentiate between beautiful and ugly, but she is saved by Dr. Golfín. He takes Nela to Pablo's villa and into Florentina's room (which used to be the room of the wife of Don Francisco) and takes care of her while she is hiding away from Pablo because of her looks. Then, due to Pablo's desire to see Florentina, Pablo finds his way to Florentina's room and serenades Florentina for all her beauty. He then has his attention drawn to Don Teodoro and Nela on the sofa and confuses her for "just a poor girl who Florentina took in from the street". Marianela then finally reveals herself and kisses Pablo's hand three times. Upon the third kiss, she dies of a broken heart and leaves Pablo distraught and shocked.

== Characters ==
- Marianela "(la) Nela" – A 16-year-old poor girl who looks like the age of 12 and has a passion for Pablo. She is not only his guide, but also his admirer.
- Pablo Penáguilas – A 20-year-old blind boy who has a passion for la Nela. Eventually regains his eyesight and because of her beauty, fancies his cousin Florentina instead, causing la Nela to die of a broken heart.
- Teodoro Golfín – The doctor who performs Pablo's eye surgery; he gives him his sight back.
- Carlos Golfín – Engineer of the mines where he lives.
- Francisco Penáguilas – Father of Pablo, cares for his son very much; he is also well respected and very rich.
- Manuel Penáguilas – The brother of Francisco and father of Florentina, the girl who marries Pablo.
- Florentina de Penáguilas – Pablo's cousin, who eventually marries him.
- Sra. Ana de Centeno – Also known as la Señana.
- Sr. Centeno – Nela's caretaker. He is the caretaker of all 60 mules for the mines.
- Celipín Centeno – The youngest of the Centeno children. Usually given money by Marianela. Wants to leave Socartes to get an education.
- Sofía de Golfín – Wife of Carlos.
- Maria Canela – Mother of Nela.

== Subject ==
The novella, in its scope of characters, is a study of the relations between pessimism, irrationalism, and fiction. These theories are embodied, respectively, in the novella's characters: Teodoro Golfín, Pablo, and Nela. The story contrasts their psychological analysis with a detailed description of nature, as an examination of the complexity of the world and its beauty.

== Film adaptations ==
In 1940, 1955 and 1972, the novel was adapted into films. A Mexican TV series based on the novel was filmed in 1961. In 1988 there was a second Mexican adaptation of Marianela as the soap opera Flor y Canela starring Edith Gonzalez (Florentina), Ernesto Laguardia (Pablo) and Daniela Leites (Marianela). There is also a teleteatro of Marianela starring Fernando Colunga as Pablo.

In 2018, Sri Lankan director Bennett Rathnayake directed the film Nela as an adaptation of the novel.

== Literary Analysis ==
Critics generally identify the novel Marianela as the pivotal novel that is situated as a juncture for many subjects within the 19th century literary and intellectual movements. These include Romanticism, Industrialization, Naturalism (literature), and a wave of enlightenment. Some analyses of this novel have suggested the shift from the sentimental idealism seen in the early 1800s to the emerging scientific rationalism. Literary critic Harrier Turner argues that Galdós wrote during a period of rapid modernization in Spain, which was marked by sciential, industrial, and medicinal expansion, and the spread of the economy which impacted all regions of Spain. She observes that Galdós's literature portrays the upheaval of traditional customs and beliefs, revealing tensions between the Romantic mode of thought and positive modernity or naturalist Romanticism. Galdós uses characters within the novela to employ themes of mining, medical science, Enlightenment rationalism, and social hierarchy, utilizing Marianela as a narrative to explore intersection of romanticism and modernism.

=== Marianela ===
Scholars argue that the Marianela embodies a number of aspects of pre-modernism; a Romantic worldview that quickly becomes marginalized as Spain enters Industrialization and a wave of emerging modern medicines. Marianela's character is a symbol of social groups left behind by this shift; people unable or unwilling to adapt from emotional intuitions, supernatural superstitions, the natural world, and illiteracy. She also serves as a symbol of spiritualism and environmental degradation.

Further, Marianela represents the ever-recurring theme of the conflict between internal and external beauty, which is illustrated through the contrast between Marianela and Florentina.

=== Teodoro Golfín ===
Teodoro Golfín, provides contrast to Marianela. His character represents the spread of modernism and the groups of people in the 1800s who were infatuated with industrialization, modern medicine, and other technological advancements, ignoring the social and environmental costs it brought forth. The advancement of medicine, which Teodoro brought forth to Pablo, corresponds to industrial and sciential progress. This progress, during the 18th century, was thought to encapsulate and alter all aspects of human society and was highlighted by many literatures written during this time.

=== Pablo Penaguilas ===
Scholars often interpret the character Pablo, as a figure who embodies groups in Spain that were able to adapt from their Romantic way of thought to scientific modernization in Marianela. His restored sight symbolizes the shift to the positivist way of thinking that was seen throughout Spain's adoption of modernization in the 19th century.

Disability

Disability plays a significant role in Marianela, appearing in both Marianela's facial disfigurement, and Pablo's blindness. Literary critic Linda M. Willem argues that the novel constructs disability through descriptive and narrative frameworks, that either through restoration or artificial alterations, or through removal. Pablo's blindness is resolved through Teodoro Golfín's medical intervention, while Marianela's death functions as what Willem describes as a removal of her disability. Willem interprets these restorations, either through the scientific correction or the termination of characters, is the way this novel corrects unbalanced social order.
