= Aganthukaya =

- Sinhala: ආගන්තුකයා
- Directed by: Vasantha Obeysekera
- Written by: Vasantha Obeysekera
- Based on: True story
- Produced by: A.G.A Films
- Starring: Saumya Liyanage; Chandani Seneviratne; Sanath Gunathilake
- Cinematography: Ruwan Costa
- Edited by: Ravindra Guruge
- Music by: Rohana Weerasinghe
- Distributed by: CEL Theatres
- Release date: 1 January 2007
- Running time: 100 minutes
- Country: Sri Lanka
- Language: Sinhala
- Budget: 6 million LKR

Aganthukaya (Sinhala: ආගන්තුකයා; English: The Outcast) is a 2007 Sri Lankan Sinhala drama film directed by Vasantha Obeysekera and produced by Anura Abeysekara for A.G.A Films with the funds of National Film Corporation of Sri Lanka. It stars Saumya Liyanage and Chandani Seneviratne in lead roles along with Sanath Gunathilake and Giriraj Kaushalya. Music composed by Rohana Weerasinghe. This is the last film directed by Vasantha Obeysekara. It is the 1087th Sri Lankan film in the Sinhala cinema.

The film has been shot in Kurunegala, for tireless seventeen days. The film has received mostly positive reviews from critics.

== Plot ==
The story revolves around a school principal who was transferred to a national school in a far flung area as a political punishment. Through his dedication and perseverance the principal develops the school with impressive academic results.

== Cast ==
- Saumya Liyanage as Sampath
- Chandani Seneviratne as Sampath's wife
- Sanath Gunathilake as Politician
- Giriraj Kaushalya
- Nimal Anthony
- Damayanthi Fonseka
- Somasiri Alakolange
- Chandrasoma Binduhewa

== Awards ==
- Sarasaviya Award for the Best Script
- Sarasaviya Award for the Best Film
