= Vedi Nowadina Lamai =

- promotional poster
- Sinhala: වෙඩි නොවදින ළමයි
- Directed by: Indika Ferdinando
- Written by: Indika Ferdinando; Piyal Kariyawasam
- Based on: a true incident
- Produced by: Deep Motion Pictures
- Starring: Kalana Gunasekara; Anasuya Subasinghe; Jayalath Manoratne; Hemasiri Liyanage
- Cinematography: Dimuthu Kalinga
- Edited by: Tissa Surendra
- Music by: Thilanka Gamage; Nadika Weligodapola
- Production company: IF Films
- Distributed by: EAP circuit
- Release date: 16 February 2023
- Country: Sri Lanka
- Language: Sinhala

Vedi Nowadina Lamai (Sinhala: වෙඩි නොවදින ළමයි; lit. 'Bulletproof Children') is a 2023 Sri Lankan Sinhala black comedy, musical thriller film directed by Indika Ferdinando and produced by Deepa Edirisinghe for Deep Motion Pictures as an EAP Film. It has ensemble cast of Kalana Gunasekara, Anasuya Subasinghe, Jayalath Manoratne, Hemasiri Liyanage, Dayadewa Edirisinghe, Mahendra Perera, Anula Bulathsinhala and Ashan Dias. It is the last film acted by late dramatist Jayalath Manoratne.

The film received mixed reviews from critics.

== Plot ==
The film revolves at the backdrop on 17 March 1996, when Sri Lanka cricket team won the 1996 ICC Cricket World Cup by defeating Australia. During this triumph. a series of events take place on a bus traveling from Colombo to Anuradhapura on the night.

== Cast ==
- Kalana Gunasekara as Piyasiri
- Anasuya Subasinghe as Piyasiri's wife
- Jayalath Manoratne as Dayaratne
- Hemasiri Liyanage as Liyanage
- Dayadewa Edirisinghe as Teacher
- Mahendra Perera as Army officer Sapumal Bandara
- Anula Bulathsinhala as lady with saline bottle
- Ashan Dias as Prabath
- Prabodini Chandrasena as Tharuka
- Sethika Gunasingha as Tharindu
- Stefan Thirimanna as Magician
- Randika Gunathilake as Bus conductor
- Sanjeewa Dissanayake as Bus driver
- Xavier Kanishka as Amila

== Production ==
The film "Bulletproof Children" made the second cinema direction of Indika Ferdinando after award-winning blockbuster Ho Gaana Pokuna. However, according to director, the screenplay of Wedi Nowadina Lamayi was written even before Ho Gana Pokuna. Ferdinando also made the screenplay along with Piyal Kariyawasam. The film is produced by Deepa Edirisinghe as her maiden cinema production with line producing by Malith Hegoda.

Cinematography of the film done by Dimuthu Kalinga, editing by Tissa Surendra and art direction by Kasun Mahawaduge. Costumes designed by Wasanthi Alwis, and makeup by Buwaneka Ranawaka. Anjana Ashubodha is the assistant production manager, and Maduranga Jagoda is the production manager. Tharindu Ranepura is the assistant director whereas sound department handled by Sasika Ruwan Marasinghe. Christopher Fernando did visual effects of the film and Dinindu Jagoda is the colorist. Music was co-composed by Thilanka Gamage and Nadika Weligodapola.

The filming took place for about 60 days in 2018. Most of the scenes have been shot during night time with 80% of them within a bus.

== Release ==
The trailer was launched at the Wellawatta Savoy Premiere Cinemas on 16 January 2023. The film was released on 16 February 2023 in EAP circuit cinemas island wide. The film generally received positive reviews from critics.

The world premier was held at 12th Bangalore International Film Festival 2020 in India. The film was also screened in Bangladesh in January 2022 at the Dhaka International Film Festival. Then the film was screened on November 24 in Xiamen, China.

== Awards and accolades ==
The film won the awards for Best International Debut Movie at the International Film Festival of Thrissur (2023) and was nominated for Best Foreign Language Film at the Golden Rooster Film Festival, China.
