= Api Marenne Na =

- DVD poster
- Sinhala: අපි මැරෙන්නේ නෑ
- Directed by: Mohan Niyaz
- Written by: K.B. Herath
- Based on: Story by Upali Udayasiri
- Produced by: Nilwala Films
- Starring: Palitha Silva; Semini Iddamalgoda; Kumara Thirimadura
- Cinematography: K.D. Dayananda
- Edited by: Buddhika Ranasinghe
- Music by: Parnath Shan
- Release date: 19 December 2014
- Country: Sri Lanka
- Language: Sinhala

Api Marenne Na (Sinhala: අපි මැරෙන්නේ නෑ) is a 2014 Sri Lankan Sinhala black comedy film directed by Mohan Niyaz and produced by Ruwan Rukmal Thilakarathne for Nilwala Films. It stars Palitha Silva and Semini Iddamalgoda in lead roles along with Kumara Thirimadura and Lucky Dias. It is the 1218th Sri Lankan film in the Sinhala cinema.

Shooting of the film was completed in and around Colombo, Kandy, Kalutara and Panadura.

== Cast ==
- Palitha Silva as Manoj Amarajeewa
- Semini Iddamalgoda as Amarajeewa's wife
- Kumara Thirimadura as Mangala Pushpakumara
- Lucky Dias as Ginige
- Sarath Kothalawala as Vidyaratne
- Anton Jude as Deepal
- D.B. Gangodathenna
- Sanoja Bibile as Ginige's wife
- Chanchala Warnasooriya
- Upali Keerthisena
- Roshan Jayasundara
- Sandali Sulakna
- Sugath Janaka
- Upali Senarathna
- Nirdha Uyanhewa
