= Kshema Bhoomi =

- Sinhala: ක්ෂේම භූමි
- Directed by: Vijaya Dharmasri
- Written by: Tissa Abeysekara
- Based on: Kshema Bhoomi by Iylin Siriwardena
- Produced by: Tissa Nagodavithana
- Starring: Jackson Anthony; Palitha Silva; Yashoda Wimaladharma
- Cinematography: Lal Wickramarachchi
- Edited by: Densil Jayaweera
- Music by: Premasiri Khemadasa
- Release date: 16 April 2010
- Running time: 120 minutes
- Country: Sri Lanka
- Language: Sinhala

Kshema Bhoomi (Sinhala: ක්ෂේම භූමි) is a 2010 Sri Lankan Sinhala drama film directed by Vijaya Dharmasri and produced by Tissa Nagodavithana. It stars Jackson Anthony, Palitha Silva and Yashoda Wimaladharma in lead roles along with Vijaya Nandasiri and Sriyantha Mendis. Music composed by Premasiri Khemadasa. It is the 1136th Sri Lankan film in the Sinhala cinema.

== Cast ==
- Asoka Peiris as Bandara
- Palitha Silva
- Jackson Anthony
- Thamara Dilrukshi
- Sangeetha Weeraratne
- Yashoda Wimaladharma as Damayanthi
- Vijaya Nandasiri
- Grace Ariyawimal
- Sriyantha Mendis
- Raja Sumanapala
- Jagath Chamila
- G.R Perera as Ralahamy
- Wasantha Wittachchi as Sumathipala
