= Aswesuma =

2001 film by Bennett Rathnayake

Aswesuma අස්වැසුම
- Directed by: Bennett Rathnayake
- Written by: Bennett Rathnayake
- Produced by: Samanmalee Hewapanna
- Starring: Joe Abeywickrama; Sangeetha Weeraratne; Jackson Anthony
- Cinematography: Channa Deshapriya
- Edited by: Stanley De Alwis
- Music by: Harsha Makalanda
- Distributed by: CEL Theaters
- Release date: 2001
- Country: Sri Lanka
- Language: Sinhala

Aswesuma (The Compensation) is a 2001 Sri Lankan crime drama film directed by Bennett Rathnayake and produced by his wife Samanmalee Hewapanna. It stars Joe Abeywickrama, Sangeetha Weeraratne, and Jackson Anthony in lead roles along with Saumya Liyanage and Mahendra Perera in supportive roles. The film was released on Visual Compact Disc (VCD) and Digital Video Disc (DVD) format by Torana Home Video in March 2003.

== Cast ==
- Joe Abeywickrama as Guneris – Old age
- Jackson Anthony as Guneris – Young
- Giriraj Kaushalya as Hunter
- Saumya Liyanage as Thug 2
- Mahendra Perera as Thug 1
- Douglas Ranasinghe as Police O.I.C.
- Ravindra Randeniya as Doctor
- Susil Gunarathna
- Edward Gunawardhana
- Gamini Hettiarachchi as Complaint officer
- Sangeetha Weeraratne as Menika
- Nalin Pradeep Udawela as Kaseem
- Hemasiri Liyanage as Appuwa
- G.R Perera as Arnolis

== Production and acclaim ==
The film is Based on John Steinbeck's novel The Pearl. It generally receives positive reviews from critics. The film was critically acclaimed and won the FIPRESCI Prize at the Bombay International Film Festival. In 2001, director Rathnayake won the Platinum award for the Best Director at the 34th Houston International Film Festival. In 2001, director won the critics award organised by the Federation of International Cinema Critics Association at the Mumbai International film festival.

The film was selected for the Montreal and Quebec City International Film Festivals as well as Moscow IFF, Singapore IFF, and Kerala IFF. In 2001, the film was selected as an entry in the competitive section at the 25th São Paulo International Film Festival in Brazil as well as 4th International film festival in India.

In 2002, film won the Don Quikoti, special jury award at the 7th Dhaka Film Festival. On 29 February 2002, the film was screened at Saint Joes Film festival and then at Tiburon International Film Festival in USA starting from 22 March 2002. In 2002, director won Golden Reel award for the Best Director at Tiburon International Film Festival held at the Tiburon Playhouse Theatre in USA from 22–28 March.

On 31 August 2002, the film was screened again at the Elphinston Theatre to donate a fund to help cancer patients. In November 2002, the film was screened at the Calcutta International Film Festival.
