= Sthuthi Nawatha Enna =

- Film poster
- Sinhala: ස්තූතියි නැවත එන්න
- Directed by: Sumith Rohana Thiththawelgala
- Written by: Sumith Rohana Thiththawelgala
- Starring: Bimal Jayakody; Damitha Abeyratne; Hemasiri Liyanage; Jagath Benaragama; Ramindu Benaragama
- Cinematography: Pushpakumara Bandara Rajaguru
- Edited by: Pravin Jayaratne
- Music by: Gayan Ganakadara
- Production companies: Rawana Films; Dil Films International
- Distributed by: CEL Theatres
- Release date: 19 February 2010
- Country: Sri Lanka
- Language: Sinhala

Sthuthi Nawatha Enna (Thank you, Come again) (Sinhala: ස්තූතියි නැවත එන්න) is a 2010 Sri Lankan Sinhala drama film directed by Sumith Rohana Thiththawelgala and produced by Mangala Madugalla for Rawana Films. It stars Bimal Jayakody and Damitha Abeyratne in lead roles along with Hemasiri Liyanage and Jagath Benaragama Ramindu Benaragama. Music composed by Gayan Ganakadara. It is the 1141st Sri Lankan film in the Sinhala cinema.

At the end of 50 days, the film grossed more than 80 SLR lakhs.

== Cast ==
- Damitha Abeyratne
- Bimal Jayakody as Keerthiratne
- Hemasiri Liyanage as Keerthiratne's father
- Jagath Benaragama
- Jayani Senanayake
- Udeni Alwis
- Keerthi Ranjith Peiris
- Asela Jayakody as Malkanthi
