= Bahu Bharya =

Bahu Bharya බහුභාර්යා
- DVD poster
- Directed by: Udayakantha Warnasuriya
- Written by: Udayakantha Warnasuriya
- Produced by: Ureka Films
- Starring: Ranjan Ramanayake; Sangeetha Weeraratne; Vasanthi Chathurani; Srinath Maddumage
- Cinematography: Jayanath Gunawardena
- Edited by: Stanley de Alwis
- Music by: Dilup Gabadamudalige
- Release date: 1 January 1999
- Running time: 85 minutes
- Country: Sri Lanka
- Language: Sinhala

Bahu Bharya (Polygyny) (Sinhala: බහුභාර්යා) is a 1999 Sri Lankan Sinhala adult suspense thriller film directed by Udayakantha Warnasuriya and produced by Ranjith Jayasuriya for Ureka Films. It stars Ranjan Ramanayake and Vasanthi Chathurani in lead roles along with Sangeetha Weeraratne and Srinath Maddumage. Music composed by Dilup Gabadamudalige. It is the 912th Sri Lankan film in the Sinhala cinema.

The film was loosely based on the film Fatal Attraction by Adrian Lyne.

== Plot ==
Kapila is a senior executive officer of a construction company and works in head office and occasionally visits sites. On a way to a site in the rain at night, his path is blocked by a tree collapsed to the road. He goes to a close by house to request an axe and to ask whether any male is there to help him. He gets the tool but no males at the house. When he works on cutting the tree and clear the path, Theja, a young woman at the house comes to help him. As both or their clothes are wet they goes to the house to change. There they get aroused by each other's bodies and have sexual intercourse. This relationship develops with the time and Theja wants to have him so in order to that she tries to kill his wife Navoda. In the attempt to take Navoda's life, Theja is killed by Navoda. Kapila takes to blame and goes to prison. After release he is reunited with his family.

== Cast ==
- Ranjan Ramanayake as Kapila
- Vasanthi Chathurani as Navoda
- Sangeetha Weeraratne as Theja
- Srinath Maddumage
- Janak Premalal
- Ranjith De Silva
- Susan Fernando as Samson
- Sudath Kumara
- Sulakkana Mihiripenna
- Sanduni Warnasuriya
