= Sumathi Best Teledrama Supporting Actress Award =

The Sumathi Best Teledrama Supporting Actress Award is presented annually in Sri Lanka by the Sumathi Group of Companies for the best Sri Lankan supporting television actress for that year.

The award was first given in 1995. The following is a list of the winners of this award since 1995.

Year	Best Supporting Actress	Teledrama	Ref.
1995	Nilanthi Wijesinghe	Kadawara	
1996	Suweneetha Wimalaweera	Niranandaya	
1997	Sabeetha Perera	Pitagamkarayo	
1998	Padmini Divithurugama	Durganthaya	
1999	Champa Shriyani	Badde Gedara	
2000	Seetha Kumari	Nannadunanni	
2001	Geetha Kanthi Jayakody	Kemmura	
2002	Nayana Kumari	Sanda Amawakai	
2003	Grece Ariyawimal	Derana	
2004	Sujani Menaka	Ramya Suramya	
2006	Sandeepa Sewmini	Sasara Sanda	
2007	Vishaka Siriwardana	Doovili Sulanga	
2008	Nilmini Buwaneka	Sudheera	
2009	Veena Jayakody	Sudu Kapuru Pethi	
2010	Nadee Chandrasekara	Ridee Ittankaraya	
2011	Chandani Seneviratne	Thaksalawa	
2012	Chathurika Peiris	Swayanjatha	
2013	Chamila Pieris	Sathkulu Pawwa	
2014	Nethalie Nanayakkara	Ihirunu Kiri	
2015	Nilmini Tennakoon	Girikula	
2016	Grace Tennakoon	Kaviya Numba	
2017	Gayani Gisanthika	Maddahana	
2018	Nirosha Thalagala	Eka Gei Minissu	
2019	Yashoda Rasaduni	Thaththa	
2021	Chandani Seneviratne	Weeraya Gedara Awith	
