= Saumya Liyanage =

Sri Lankan actor

- සෞම්‍ය ලියනගේ
- Born: Saumya Prabath Danwatta Liyanage; Sri Lanka
- Education: University of Kelaniya; Flinders University; La Trobe University
- Occupations: Actor, lecturer
- Years active: 1992–present
- Parent(s): Hemasiri Liyanage (father); Kusum Liyanage (mother)
- Relatives: Indrachapa Liyanage (brother)
- Awards: Best Actor; Best Supporting Actor

Saumya Prabath Danwatta Liyanage, popularly known as Saumya Liyanage (Sinhala: සෞම්‍ය ලියනගේ) is an actor in Sri Lankan cinema, stage drama and television. He is a senior lecturer and currently the Dean, Faculty of Graduate Studies in University of the Visual and Performing Arts by profession. Highly versatile actor mainly involved in dramatic roles, Saumya is the son of veteran dramatist Hemasiri Liyanage and brother of musician Indrachapa Liyanage.

== Personal life ==
Liyanage completed his bachelor's degree of arts (BA) from University of Kelaniya and then master's degree in Creative Arts from Flinders University, South Australia. He completed Phd. from La Trobe University, Melbourne in Drama Program under the guidance of Dr. Rob Conkie.

== Career ==
He started stage work early 1990s when he is an undergraduate at the Kelaniya University. After that, he became a continues leading actor in stage drama. His maiden television acting came through the drama Sittara Gurunnanse in 1992. He acted handful of television dramas and particularly rejecting soap operas and mega teledramas. He went Australia in 2010 for academic activities and returned in 2014. By 2010, he performed in Rajitha Dissanayake's stage play Apahu Harenna Ba, where he won the Best Actor Award at the State Drama Festival that year. Then he acted in Indika Ferdinando's stage play Colombo Colombo. The play was selected for the International Women's Drama Festival in India and held two seasons for Indian audiences in New Delhi and Mumbai.

Liyanage started his film career with Padadaya back in 1999, directed by Linton Semage. His most popular cinema acting came through films Aba, Walapatala and Nimnayaka Hudekalawa. The role in Aba as Habaraa was highly praised by the critics. In 2014, he appeared in the Asoka Handagama's play Antique Kadayaka Maranayak.

=== Selected theater works ===
- Clouds Nine (1994) Produced by the Department of English, University of Kelaniya
- N’Kruma Ni Africa Ni (1995)
- Kontharaththuwa (2005)
- Hansaintath Man Asai (1996)
- Daru Prashne Puthra Prashne (1997)
- Gabsawa (1998)
- Last Bus Eke Kathawa (1999)
- Mata Wedi Thiyan Nedda? (1999)
- Dawasa Thama Gewne Ne (1999)
- Mata Erehiwa Mama (2001)
- Closer (2001) (An Original Play by Patrick Maber) - Performed at the Flinders University, South Australia
- Horu Samaga Heluwen (2005)
- Weeraya Merila (2006)
- Apasu Herenna Be (2008)
- Colombo Colombo (2008)
- The Irresistible Rise of Mr. Signno (2016)

=== Selected television serials ===
- Sittara Gurunnanse (1992)
- Kalpanthayak (1993)
- Ramya Nagaraya (1995)
- Bambara Sakmana (1995)
- Manasthapaya (1996)
- Itipahan (1996)
- Imadiya Mankada (1997)
- Nikini Paluwa (1999)
- Mangalam (2001)
- Apparitions (2006)
- Diul Gase Kola Sulange Wisira Yathi (2007)
- The Lake (2025)

== Author work ==
- Fo Ranga Wedamulu: Theatre Workshops by Dario Foe
- Meditations On Acting: Theory Practice and Performance
- Lamp in a Windless Place: Phenomenology and Performance (2025)

== Filmography ==
Key
†	Denotes films that have not yet been released

Year	Film	Role	Ref.
1987	Padadaya	Home guard	
1999	Theertha Yathra		
2001	Aswesuma	Thug	
2001	Me Mage Sandai		
2001	Mathu Yam Dawasa	Dhammika	
2002	Mage Wam Atha	Kamal's boss	
2002	Salelu Warama	Darshan	
2005	Sulanga Enu Pinisa	Palitha	
2006	Udugan Yamaya		
2007	Aganthukaya	Sampath	
2007	Nisala Gira	Marko	
2008	Walapatala	Dr. Delgoda	
2008	Aba	Habaraa	
2008	Machan		
2010	Ira Handa Yata	Mahasen	
2010	Vidhu	Politician	
2017	Nimnayaka Hudekalawa	Vishwa	
2017	Heena Hoyana Samanallu	Aditya Wijebandara	
2025	Rani		
TBA	Chandarege Wife †		
TBA	Raavana †		
TBA	Father †		

== Awards and accolades ==
He has won several awards at the state theater festivals and local film festivals.

=== Sarasaviya Awards ===
Year	Nominee / work	Award	Result
2007	Aganthukaya	Best Actor	Won
2008	Walapatala	Best Supporting Actor	Won
2017	Nimnayaka Hudekalawa	Best Actor	Won

=== ADSA Awards ===
Year	Nominee / work	Award	Result
2011	‘My body taught me how to act – towards an epistemology of actor learning and apprenticeship	Best Paper	Won

=== 22nd Bunka Awards ===
Year	Nominee / work	Award	Result
2015	Drama/Acting	Creative activities in culture and arts	Won
