= Bambara Walalla =

- official poster
- Sinhala: බඹර වළල්ල
- Directed by: Athula Liyanage
- Written by: Athula Liyanage
- Starring: Athula Liyanage; Damitha Abeyratne; Mahendra Perera
- Cinematography: Thisula Deepa Thambawita
- Edited by: Ajith Ramanayake
- Music by: Kasun Kalhara
- Production companies: Human & Nature Films
- Distributed by: CEL Theaters
- Release date: 6 August 2010
- Running time: 108 minutes
- Country: Sri Lanka
- Language: Sinhala

Bambara Walalla (The Whirlwind) (Sinhala: බඹර වළල්ල) is a 2010 Sri Lankan Sinhala drama thriller film directed by Athula Liyanage and co-produced by Athula Liyanage, Nita Fernando, J.S.D Dammika, Daminda D. Madawala and Channa Deshapriya for Human & Nature Films. It stars Athula Liyanage, Damitha Abeyratne and Mahendra Perera in lead roles along with Bimal Jayakodi and Nita Fernando. Music composed by Kasun Kalhara. The film received positive reviews from critics. It is the 1142nd Sri Lankan film in the Sinhala cinema.

== Plot ==
In the beginning, an uneducated teenager Podi Eka ("young one") is shown living with his mother, sister and stepfather. He helps his stepfather in his "kasippu" (a local alcohol) business. Stepfather has been raping Podi Eka's elder sister but kept secret from him by both the sister and mother. One day Podi Eka returns home to find his sister screaming and locked up by inside by stepfather. Afterwards she hangs and kills herself. In anger, Podi Eka hits the rapist stepfather with a hoe in anger killing him, who is then sent in prison for 17 years.

Podi Eka's returns to his home village being released from the prison. His mother, who is now mentally ill, is seem to have been looked after by his uncle and the family. He find a living working for his uncle. He later develops feelings for the uncle's daughter and when revealed to her, is rejected and insulted by her, which causes him to cut her hair off in anger. He is then shown to be beaten up almost to death by a group, presumably the work of his uncle, but saved by the arrival of a Mr. Mel who gets Podi Eka to a hospital.

His house is also seen to be set on fire as his uncle and the family leaves the village. As Podi Eka is still in hospital, unable to walk, he informed that his house was lit and his mother might be deceased by fire. He is visited by Mr. Mel right after and is asked to come with him. He eventually starts working for Mel. He gets entangled in crime working for Mr. Mel, and is sent into hiding after murdering two people, where he meets a girl, Kumari.

Kumari and Podi Eka develops a relationship and eventually gotten married by Mel who although shown to express resistance to at first. On the wedding day, Kumari reveals Podi Eka that she was earlier married to Ralahami, a disabled man, of whom Podi Eka is informed to be Mel's son, is not actually not his son and also he was actually disabled by Mel. Podi Eka who is assigned for a robbery by Mel the next day succeeds in returning safe although after losing his companion. After the robbery, Mel tries to kill Podi Eka in his sleep but saved by Ralahami who shoots Mel. Jine, who was told to wait for the Podi Eka's body by Mel earlier, is visited by Podi Eka instead and told to burn Mel's body. At the end it's shown that Podi Eka now owns the funeral service and Ralahami, Jine and Kumari is also shown to be working there.

== Cast ==
- Athula Liyanage as Gonamadiththe Podi Eka
- Damitha Abeyratne as Kumari
- Nita Fernando as Mother
- Bimal Jayakody as Sunil
- Sriyantha Mendis as Jine
- Mahendra Perera as Mel
- Sarath Kothalawala
- Jayalath Manoratne as Podi Eka's uncle
- Sujeewa Priyalal as Youth at Parlor

== Awards ==
- 43rd World Fest International Houston Film Festival Remi award for the Best Director
- 43rd World Fest International Houston Film Festival Award for the Best Cinematography - Thisula Deepa Thambawita
