= Hemasiri Liyanage =

Sri Lankan actor

- හේමසිරි ලියනගේ
- Born: Hemasiri Danawaththa Liyanage; December 25, 1942 (age 83); Bulathsinhala, Sri Lanka
- Education: Vidyarathana College, Horana
- Occupations: Actor, dramatist, director, teacher
- Years active: 1967–present
- Known for: Acting
- Spouse: Kusum Liyanage
- Children: Saumya Liyanage; Aloka Liyanage; Saman Liyanage; Indrachapa Liyanage
- Relatives: Samanalee Fonseka (daughter-in-law)

Hemasiri Dhanawaththa Liyanage (Sinhala: හේමසිරි ධනවත්ත ලියනගේ, born December 25, 1942), is a Sri Lankan actor, dramatist, and former educator. Widely regarded as one of the finest actors on Sri Lankan stage, television and cinema, he is well known for his dramatic roles in the television series Thattu Gewal and Thaththa, as well as the feature films Sankranthi, Sthuthi Nawatha Enna, and Madhura Charika.

== Personal life ==
Hemasiri Liyanage was born on 25 December 1942 in Nahalla, Bulathsinhala, the third of four children. He completed his secondary education at Vidyarathana College in Horana. He later married Kusum Liyanage, a retired teacher. The couple had four sons: Saumya, an actor and academic; Saman, an artist; Aloka, a physician; and Indrachapa, a rock musician. His daughter-in-law is actress and social activist Samanalee Fonseka, who married his son Indrachapa in 2010.

== Career ==
=== Education and teaching career (1964-1980) ===
In 1964, Liyanage gained admission to the University of Kelaniya, graduating with a Bachelor of Arts. During his time at university, he founded the student drama organization National Drama Corporation. Following graduation, he worked as a teacher at Vidyarathana College in Horana, where he taught Advanced Level economics and drama as a supplementary subject. He lost his teaching position in July 1980 after participating in the nationwide general strike, during which President J. R. Jayewardene's government dismissed over 40,000 public sector workers.

=== Acting career (1967-present) ===
Liyanage began his theatre career in 1967 as a playwright, producer, and lead actor in the stage drama Kanakok Suda. He subsequently appeared in Rohana Beddage's play Balal Hasthaya. While studying, he produced the 1969 stage drama Nadagam Hewath Sudu Atha Awata Passe, which controversially earned second place in the Inter-school drama competition. In 1975, he produced Nariya Saha Keju; he and co-creator Vijaya Nandasiri received awards for Best Production and Best Music at the National Drama Festival that year. His final stage drama production was Chithrage Prema Kathwa in 1982.

Liyanage made his feature film debut in 1983 with a minor role in Siri Kularathna's Niliyakata Pem Kalemi. His early film career primarily consisted of cameo appearances, including roles in Doo Daruwo (1985), Sisila Gini Gani (1992), Kiyala Wadak Na (1992), Guru Gedara (1993), and Bawa Duka (1997). He later appeared in notable cinematic releases such as Aswesuma (2001), Me Mage Sandai (2001), Sulanga Enu Pinisa (2005), Sankranthi (2007), Sthuthi Nawatha Enna (2010), Madhura Charika (2018), and Sansare Dadayakkaraya (2019). In 2022, he featured in Sumith Rathnayaka's drama Ran Kolla.

His television career began in 1997 with a role in the international television film Mother Teresa: In the Name of God's Poor, directed by Kevin Connor. He subsequently established a prominent career in Sri Lankan television, starring in numerous serials including Amba Yahaluwo, Eka Iththaka Mal, Sanda Dev Diyani, Idorayaka Mal Pipila, Sindu Kiyana Una Pandura, Thattu Gewal, Kokila Sandwaniya, Ayal, Dahas Gawdura, and Thanamalvila Kollek. In 2018, Liyanage received a special tribute award at the Raigam Tele'es ceremony for his lifelong contributions to Sri Lankan television and cinema.

=== Selected television serials ===
- Amba Yahaluvo
- Amuthu Minissu
- Anantha
- Asalwasiyo
- Athuru Paara
- Ayal
- Chakraudhaya
- Dahas Gawdura
- Dambulugala Sakmana
- Eka Iththaka Mal
- Girikula
- Idorayaka Mal Pipila
- Jeewithaya Dakinna
- Kadathira
- Kampitha Vil
- Kasee Salu
- Kethumathi Neyo
- Kokila Sandwaniya
- Kulawamiya
- Mayaratne
- Mayavi
- Meedum Amma
- Minigan Dela
- Mini Palanga
- Ramya Suramya
- Pinketha
- Podu
- Sanda Dev Diyani
- Sandagira
- Sindu Kiyana Una Pandura
- Sisila Ima
- Suwanda Yahaluwo
- Thanamalvila Kollek
- Thaththa
- Thattu Gewal
- Wanawadule Wasanthaya

== Filmography ==
Key
†	Denotes films that have not yet been released

Year	Film	Role	Ref.
1983	Niliyakata Pem Kalemi	Master Mahathaya 'Kalwirale'	
1985	Doo Daruwo		
1991	Sthree		
1992	Sisila Gini Gani	Missionary	
1992	Kiyala Wadak Na	Jamis Appu	
1993	Saptha Kanya	Rony	
1993	Guru Gedara	Ukkuwa	
1994	Aragalaya	Wilson	
1997	Mother Teresa: In the Name of God's Poor	Gem Suleiman	
1997	Bawa Duka	Gabriel, Nona Hami's father	
1997	Bawa Karma	Nona Hami's father	
1998	Channa Kinnari		
1999	Nagaran	Master	
2001	Aswesuma	Appuwa	
2001	Anantha Rathriya	Appu	
2001	Me Mage Sandai		
2002	Salelu Warama	Suren's father	
2002	Sudu Sewaneli		
2003	Pura Sakmana		
2003	Sudu Kaluwara	Suddhana	
2005	Sulanga Enu Pinisa	Piyasiri	
2006	Kurulu Pihatu	Grand father	
2007	Sankranthi		
2008	Machan	Manoj's father	
2010	Sthuthi Nawatha Enna	Vidane	
2011	Mahindagamanaya	Mantha	
2013	Miles of a Dream	(french film)	
2014	Kalpanthe Sihinayak	Village monk	
2017	Heena Hoyana Samanallu	Tharaka's grandfather	
2018	Madhura Charika	Wilson Godamanne	
2018	Nidahase Piya DS	D.D. Pedris	
2019	Weli Pawuru	Sisira's father	
2019	Sansare Dadayakkaraya	Monk	
2019	Vishama Bhaga	Madiris	
2025	Sihina Sarungal		
2023	Vedi Nowadina Lamai		
TBA	Megha Warsha †		
TBA	Cricket Sadu †		

== Awards and accolades ==
=== Raigam Tele'es ===
Year	Nominee / work	Award	Result
2018	Contribution to cinema	Special Tribute	Won
