= Sulanga =

2005 film

Sulanga සුළඟ
- DVD poster
- Directed by: Bennett Rathnayake
- Written by: Bennett Rathnayake
- Produced by: Bennett Rathnayake
- Starring: Sanath Gunathilake; Dilhani Ekanayake; Chandani Seneviratne
- Cinematography: Biju Viswanath
- Edited by: Ravindra Guruge
- Music by: Rohana Weerasinghe
- Release date: 22 September 2005
- Country: Sri Lanka
- Language: Sinhala

Sulanga (The Wind) (Sinhala: සුළඟ) is a 2005 Sri Lankan Sinhala drama film directed and produced by Bennett Rathnayake. It stars Sanath Gunathilake and Dilhani Ekanayake in lead roles along with Chandani Seneviratne and Palitha Silva. Music composed by Rohana Weerasinghe. The film also staged debut acting of Rathnayake's children Sathya Erandathi Rathnayake and Udara Rathnayake. It is the 1165th Sri Lankan film in the Sinhala cinema.

The film has received mostly positive reviews from critics. The film won six awards at the Calcutta International Film festival, Montreal IFF and Rio International Film Festival in Brazil. In 2006, the film won the Silver Remi Award at the Houston International Film Festival. The film was selected to be screened in the competitive section of Pyongyang International Film Festival in September 2006.

The film was released in DVD and VCD by Torana Home Video with English subtitles is distributed by Torana Music Box in December 2006.

== Cast ==
- Sanath Gunathilake as Senarathne
- Dilhani Ekanayake as Crisanthi
- Chandani Seneviratne as Margaret
- Erandathi Rathnayake as Kumari
- Sriyani Amarasena as Judge
- Palitha Silva as Siripala
- Daya Alwis as Salesman
- Namel Weeramuni as Crisanthi's father
- Udara Rathnayake as Kumari's love interest
- Rangana Premaratne
- Roger Seneviratne as Donald
- Seetha Kumari
- Bandula Vithanage as Senarathne's father
- Jagath Chamila as Threewheel driver
- Sanoja Bibile
- Semini Iddamalgoda
