= Tissa Nagodavithana =

Sri Lankan film preservationist (1942–2020)

Tissa Nagodavithana තිස්ස නාගොඩවිතාන
- Born: Tissa Mahanama Nagodavithana; 10 January 1942; Galle, Sri Lanka
- Died: 25 March 2020 (aged 78); Colombo, Sri Lanka
- Other names: Ti. Na. (ති.නා.)
- Education: St.Thomas' College, Matara
- Alma mater: University of Ceylon
- Occupations: Film producer, film preservationist
- Years active: 1970–2018
- Spouse: Kumari Nagodavithana
- Children: Harith Kanishka, Harin Kanishka, Charith Abhishek

Tissa Mahanama Nagodavithana (10 January 1942 – 25 March 2020 as Sinhala: තිස්ස නාගොඩවිතාන) [Sinhala]), popularly known as Tissa Nagodavithana and Ti. Na., was a renowned film preservationist, film director, film producer and a singer. Considered as the leading film preservationist in Sri Lankan cinema, Nagodavithana contributed to preserve many rare Sinhala, Hindi, Tamil and English films of early cinema.

== Personal life ==
He was born on 10 January 1942 in Wekunugoda Road, Bope, Galle, Sri Lanka. One of his close relatives known as poet 'Bope Dasa' was a famous poet of the Colombo era. He first studied at Richmond College, Galle. Tissa taught Economics at the Sri Lanka College, Maradana for a while after obtaining a special degree in Economics from the University of Ceylon.

He was married to Kumari Nagodavithana and was a father of three sons. Eldest son Harith Kanishka works as a doctor at a Scottish hospital with his Scottish doctor wife. The second son, Harin Kanishka, and the youngest son, Charith Abhishek, are preserving 700 Sinhala films and about 300 teledramas with their mother. Charith is married to actress Bhagya Ratnayake, the daughter of film director Bennett Rathnayake. Bhagya is also an actress who has acted in several television serials such as Sanda Sakmana, Nimwalalla and films Sulanga and Ira Handa Yata. Harin was married to Dilini de Silva, sister of ABC (Asia Broadcasting Corporation) Network chairman Reynor Silva and politician Duminda Silva.

He died on 25 March 2020 at the age of 78 while receiving treatment at a private hospital. His remains were kept at a private funeral parlor in Borella and final rites took place on 26 March 2020 at 5.00 pm at the Borella Cemetery.

== Career ==
His passion for singing came to fruition when he sang on the radio programs Pibidena Gayaka Parapura and Maliban Guwan Thotilla in the mid seventies. He has sung the songs of his most beloved singer H. R. Jothipala in these programs and in the final round of Pibidena Gayaka Parapura, Nagodavithana sang Jothipala's song 'Me Desa Mage Pinvanthai' and later became the second runner-up. He released an album of his own songs titled 'Suba Upandinak Wewa' and sang the popular song "Wasana Lowak Genawa". The songs "Sudu Mudu Sumudu Pinyaraya" and "Suba Upun Dinayak" sung by Tissa on that album were also popular at that time.

Meanwhile, his interest on cinema grew largely after the influence with the journalist Ernest Waduge. In 1977 he was the production superintendent of the film 'Living with Maruwa' directed by Titus Thotawatte. In the film, he also involved as the playback singer. In 1978, he was part of the music crew in the film Kundala Keshi. In 1981, he co-directed the comedy film Kolankarayo with Sunil Ariyaratne. Then in 1984, he directed and produced the comedy film Kekkille Rajjuruwo. Meanwhile, he also produced Guththila Moosila and Mahadanamutta.

Apart from production and direction, he is most notable as the leading film preservationist of Sri Lanka. During 1970s, film producers had to wait for two or three years to make a film and screen it due to long the show queue. Therefore, Nagodavithana thought to buy old movies and screen them soon. First, he bought the film Manushyathwaya in 1977 from Robin Tampoe, the producer of the film after paying Rs. 100,000 for the rights. Then he took the rights to the film Raththaran Amma. Then he went to see producer Douglas Kothalawala five times to ask the rights of the blocksbuster film Deepashika. He always scolded and chased Nagodavithana away. When he went for the sixth time, Kothalawala gave Nagodavithana the rights of the film. Nagodavithana’s initials ති.නා. (Ti. Na.) can be found in most of the early Sinhala films. He purchased, renovated and preserved old films to watch them on television and in DVD for future generations.

In 1998, he was honored with "Namaskara Pooja" Special Award at the 25th Sarasaviya Awards. In 2001, he received Special Cinema Merit at 14th Presidential Film Awards.

In 2010, he produced the film Kreshma Bhumi, starring Cheruka Weerakoon, which received critics acclaim in that year. Then in 2012, Nagodavithana produced the film Kusa Paba which was directed by Sunil Ariyaratne. The film became the highest grossing film of that year and later won several awards at local film festivals. In 2018, he was awarded with Signis International Award at the 41st SIGNIS Sri Lanka Salutation Awards Ceremony.

== Filmography ==
Year	Film	Roles	Ref.
1977	Maruwa Samaga Wase	Production superintendent, Playback Singer	
1978	Kundala Keshi	Music Crew	
1981	Kolamkarayo	Director, Composer, Lyricist	
1984	Kekkille Rajjuruwo	Director, Playback Singer	
2010	Kshema Bhoomi	Producer	
2012	Kusa Pabha	Co-Producer	
TBD	Guththila	Supervisor	
