= Ran Kevita =

2007 Sri Lankan children's mystery film

Ran Kevita 1 රන් කෙවිට
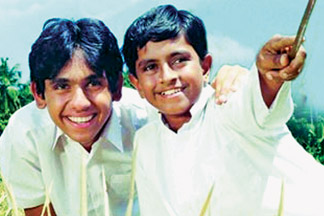
- Directed by: Udayakantha Warnasuriya
- Written by: Udaya kantha Warnasuriya
- Produced by: Millennium Entertainment
- Starring: Hisham Samsudeen; Vijaya Nandasiri; Srinath Maddumage
- Cinematography: Pravin Jayarathne
- Edited by: Pravin Jayarathne
- Music by: Sangeeth Wickramasinghe
- Distributed by: Millennium Entertainment
- Release date: 16 March 2007
- Running time: 120 minutes
- Country: Sri Lanka
- Language: Sinhala

Ran Kevita 1 (The Golden Rod), (Sinhala: රන් කෙවිට) is a 2007 Sri Lankan Sinhala children's fantasy film directed by Udayakantha Warnasuriya and co-produced by Pravin Jayarathne, Dilman Jayaratne, Janitha Marasinghe and Udayakantha Warnasuriya for Millennium Entertainment. Its sequel film Ran Kevita 2 directed by the same director released in 2013. It stars Harith Beddewela and Hisham Samsudeen in lead role along with Vijaya Nandasiri and Srinath Maddumage. Music composed by Sangeeth Wickramasinghe. It is the 1084th Sri Lankan film in the Sinhala cinema.

== Plot ==
12-year-old Suran comes from a village. His pen friend Janith lives in town and he visits Suran's rural village during school vacations. Going around the beautiful village Suran and Janith one day visit a friend's home. There they find a loris. Seeing the animal Suran is reminded of a story he had read in a book and the two friends start to dig out the truth of what he had heard. Getting together with a young novice monk in the temple the two friends find books that mention about a supernatural power that can be obtained using the tears of loris. With the help of the monk they prepare the application which could be used to see the guardian devil of bulls. They further realise if they can have access to the golden rod belonging to the devil they would be able to do wonders. Suran and Janith prepare the application and apply it on their eyelids, see the devil and obtain the rod.

== Cast ==
- Harith Baddewela as Suresh
- Hisham Samsudeen as Janith
- Srinath Maddumage as Vilba
- Vijaya Nandasiri as Suran's father
- Semini Iddamalgoda as Janith's mother
- Bennett Rathnayake as Janith's father
- Sarath Chandrasiri as Devil
- Ariyasena Gamage as Card player
- Saman Hemaratne as Dingiya
- Gunawardena Hettiarachchi
- Susantha Chandramali as Suran's mother

== Songs ==
පැන්සල් පොත් නෑලු - Raminda Dixy

== Soundtrack ==
No.	Title	Lyrics	Length
1.	"පැන්සල් පොත් නෑලු - Pansal Poth Nalu"	පැන්සල් පොත් නෑලු පාසැල් නෑ යාලු රෑ දාවල් උදේ හවා දැන් මුළු ගම අපේ තමා පෙන්නා අපේ හපන් කම් ඒදණ්ඩෙන් එහාට යං මාලු පැටව් උඩ කරනම් ගහන ඇලේ නාමු පීන පීනා අපි දාංගලේ ඉද්ච්ච අඹ නම් අර උඩ අත්තේ ගහට නගිමු දැන් කමු ඇති වෙනකන් වසු පැටියෝ අනේ ඉතිං අපි යමු අස්ස ගුඩුං ගුං
