= Walapatala =

Walapatala වලාපටල
- Directed by: Vijitha Gunaratne
- Written by: Vijitha Gunaratne
- Produced by: Kasheyapa Gunarathna; Nelum Gunarathna
- Starring: Jayalath Manoratne; Jayani Senanayake; Saumya Liyanage
- Cinematography: K. D. Dayananda
- Edited by: Ravindra Guruge
- Music by: Tharupathi Munasinghe
- Distributed by: CEL Theaters
- Release date: 27 May 2008
- Country: Sri Lanka
- Language: Sinhala

Walapatala (Penumbra) (Sinhala: වලාපටල) is a 2008 Sri Lankan Sinhala drama film directed by Vijitha Gunaratne and co-produced by Kasheyapa Gunarathna and Nelum Gunarathna. It stars Jayalath Manoratne and Jayani Senanayake in lead roles along with Saumya Liyanage and Gamini Haththotuwegama. Music composed by Tharupathi Munasinghe. It is the 1107th Sri Lankan film in the Sinhala cinema.

== Cast ==
- Jayani Senanayake as Sumana
- Gamini Haththotuwegama as Dr. Manoharan
- Jayalath Manoratne as Council member Victor Jayasundara
- Saumya Liyanage as Dr. Delgoda
- Lal Kularatne as Sergeant Banda
- Palitha Silva as Chartin
- Duleeka Marapana as Sheela
- Deepani Silva as Nurse
- Kumara Thirimadura - uncredited role
- Somasiri Alakolange
- Athula Liyanage as Amarapala
- Anton Jude as Piyasena
- Nalin Pradeep Udawela
- Dharmapriya Dias
- Swarna Mallawarachchi - guest appearance

== Awards ==
- 2008 Sarasaviya Award for the Best Director - Vjitha Gunaratne
- 2008 Sarasaviya Award for the Best Supporting Actor - Saumya Liyanage
- 2008 Sarasaviya Award for the Best Art Direction - Lal Harindranath
