= Joyful Journeys =

- Film poster
- Sinhala: මධුර චාරිකා
- Directed by: Udayakantha Warnasuriya
- Written by: Udayakantha Warnasuriya
- Produced by: Udayakantha Warnasuriya
- Starring: Hemasiri Liyanage; Nalin Pradeep Udawela; Madani Malwattege
- Cinematography: Ayeshmantha Hettiarachchi
- Edited by: Pravin Jayaratne
- Music by: Navaratne Gamage
- Release date: 16 March 2018
- Running time: 85 minutes
- Country: Sri Lanka
- Language: Sinhala

Joyful Journeys (Sinhala: මධුර චාරිකා, romanized: Madhura Charika) is a 2018 Sri Lankan Sinhala drama film directed and produced by Udayakantha Warnasuriya. It stars Hemasiri Liyanage in lead role along with Nalin Pradeep Udawela, Madani Malwattage and Kumara Thirimadura. Music composed by Navaratne Gamage.

The film has been shot around Nuwara Eliya, Colombo and Tharangani Cinema Hall. The film received mostly positive reviews from critics.

== Synopsis ==
The film about Wilson Godamanne, an 85-year old former film actor, who lives with his son, daughter in law and two grandchildren in the picturesque hill country of Sri Lanka.

The film captures the lives of ordinary folk. Nostalgically reaching out for his former glory, Wilson decides to attend a film festival showing one of his films. Accompanied by his 8-year-old grandson, Wilson arrives in time to see himself. On his way to catch his bus, he is stricken fatally by a heart attack. With only a helpless child at hand, Wilson experiences the compassion of strangers and friends. The film leaves behind a lasting impression of the need of humans to find value in themselves especially as the light of life begins to fade.

== Cast ==
- Hemasiri Liyanage as Wilson Godamanne
- Nalin Pradeep Udawela as Jaye
- Madani Malwattage as Sujaatha
- Sudam Katukitule as Wilson's grandson
- Sarath Chandrasiri as Sudath
- Kumara Thirimadura as Bus conductor
- Dharmapriya Dias as Threewheel driver
- Ramani Alakolanga
- Ajith Lokuge
- Chathura Perera
- Wilman Sirimanne as Rathne ayya, the bus driver
- Nilmini Tennakoon in special appearance
- Kelum Srimal as Announcer
- Ravindra Randeniya in special appearance
- Channa Perera in special appearance
- Udari Warnakulasooriya in special appearance
- Manjula Yalegama as Photographer
- Rajasinghe Loluwagoda as Servant

== Awards ==
- Amsterdam Film Festival - Jury Award
