= Katha Karana Heena =

- Sinhala: කතා කරන හීන
- Directed by: Somalatha Herath Menike
- Written by: Somalatha Herath Menike
- Produced by: Somalatha Herath Menike
- Starring: Buddhika Jayaratne; Semini Iddamalgoda; Chandrasoma Binduhewa
- Cinematography: Ajantha Ekanayake
- Music by: Sujith Milroy; Prasanna Sanjeewa
- Distributed by: Rithma Circuit
- Release date: 15 March 2019
- Country: Sri Lanka
- Language: Sinhala

Katha Karana Heena (Sinhala: කතා කරන හීන, lit. 'Dreams Without My Tears') is a 2019 Sri Lankan Sinhala children's film directed and produced by Somalatha Herath Menike. It stars Buddhika Jayaratne, Semini Iddamalgoda and Chandrasoma Binduhewa in lead roles along with many child actors. Music co-composed by Sujith Milroy and Prasanna Sanjeewa. It is the 1325th Sri Lankan film in the Sinhala cinema.

== Cast ==
- Buddhika Jayaratne
- Semini Iddamalgoda
- Chandrasoma Binduhewa
- Ananda Atukorale
- Maneesha Shymali
- Dinul Ransith
- Anjana Premaratne
- Buddhika Kalindu
- Ranil Prasad
- Mahinda Karunaratne
- Sujani Hettiarachchi
- Amaya Muyulasi
- Adeesha Rathnayake
