= Kawuruth Danne Na =

- Directed by: Bennett Rathnayake
- Written by: Bennett Rathnayake; Chulabhaya Shantha Kumara Herath
- Produced by: Bennett Rathnayake
- Starring: Bimal Jayakody; Udari Warnakulasooriya; Kumara Thirimadura; Sangeetha Weeraratne; Lucky Dias
- Cinematography: Dhanushka Gunathilake
- Edited by: Ajith Ramanayake
- Music by: Malinda Thennakoon
- Release date: 22 December 2021
- Running time: 128 minutes
- Country: Sri Lanka
- Language: Sinhala

Kawuruth Danne Na (lit. 'Nobody Knows'; Sinhala: කවුරුවත් දන්නේ නෑ) is a 2021 Sri Lankan Sinhalese-language political thriller film directed by Bennett Rathnayake and co-produced by director himself with Samanmalee Hewamanna for Benn Films. It stars Bimal Jayakody and Udari Warnakulasooriya in lead roles along with Kumara Thirimadura, Sangeetha Weeraratne and Lucky Dias made supportive roles. The film deals with corrupt and unfair rules and laws in several government officials, where a 17 years old poor schoolgirl goes to the probation prison for stealing 8 nuts of coconut, but nothing happened for corrupted officials, businessmen and drug lords.

== Cast ==
- Bimal Jayakody as Inspector Wikrama Lokubandara
- Sangeetha Weeraratne as Theja Madugalle
- Udari Warnakulasooriya as Jānu, Wickrama's wife
- Lucky Dias as Rohan gunawardena, Sub Inspector of Police
- Kumara Thirimadura as Council member
- Buddhika Jayaratne as Roy
- Gihan Fernando as Minister Rathnasurendra
- Buddhadasa Vithanarachchi as Lawyer Warnakulasuriya
- Duleeka Marapana as Probation officer
- Udara Rathnayake as Inspector Saman
- Darshan Dharmaraj as Jayādevan, minister's ally
- Isuru Lokuhettiarachchi as Lucky
- Jayani Senanayake as Anula, Sudheera's mother
- Nethalie Nanayakkara as Sudheera's granny
- Ann Nimeshika as Sudheerā
- Ajith Lokuge as Watchman
- Teena Shanell as Teena, Lucky's girlfriend
- Adam Adamally as Lawrence
- Uditha Gunaratna
- Lasantha Fancis as Minister's henchman
- Dinusha Rajapathirana as TV reporter
- Ferni Roshani
- Crystal Imera as Nilāni
- Aruni Me
- Malkanthi Jayasinghe as School Principal
- Sathya Ratnayake
- Dinusha Rajapathirana as News reporter

== Production ==
This is the fifth cinematic direction by Bennett Rathnayake. Danushka Goonetileke is the cinematographer. Prasanna Itthapana joins in the support direction whereas Sujiwa Gunaratne is the artistic director. Ashoka Ariyaratne contributes to the production management. Kumara Karawdeniya is a fashion designer and Priyantha Dissanayake joins the casting. Music composed by Milinda Tennakoon and sound design by Priyantha Kaluarachchi. Lyrics of the film songs done by Dr. Sunil Ariyaratne and background vocals by Dr. Nanda Malini. The film is edited by Ajith Ramanayake and Visual effects done by Chathara Weeraman and color combination by Dinidu Jagoda.

== Release ==
The trailer of the film was released on 27 January 2021 through YouTube. The premiere took place on January 31, 2021, in Melbourne, Australia. The film was released in Sri Lanka on 22 December 2021. Before that, the film was successfully screened in Australia and New Zealand. It is the first Sinhala film to receive a continuous multiple show Sunday screening slots in Australian theatres in Melbourne, Adelaide and Sydney as well as received housefull audience.
