= Seda Mawathe =

- සේද මාවතේ
- Directed by: Harsha Udakanda
- Written by: Harsha Udakanda
- Produced by: HU Creations; Hiruna Films
- Starring: Anuj Ranasinghe; Harshi Anjumala; Cletus Mendis; Damitha Abeyratne
- Cinematography: Janith Gunasekara
- Edited by: Thivanka Amarasiri
- Music by: Niroshan Sanjeewa
- Distributed by: LFD Theaters
- Release date: 20 February 2020
- Country: Sri Lanka
- Language: Sinhala

Seda Mawathe (Sinhala: සේද මාවතේ) is a 2020 Sri Lankan Sinhala action film directed by Harsha Udakanda and co-produced by director himself with Nishantha Jayawardena, Pushpa Silva and lead actor Anuj Ranasinghe for HU Creations and Hiruna Films. It stars Anuj Ranasinghe in lead role with newcomer Harshi Anjumala whereas Cletus Mendis and Damitha Abeyratne made supportive roles.

The media screening of the film was held at the Tharangani Cinema Hall of the National Film Corporation. The screening of the film halted due to prevailing COVID-19 pandemic in Sri Lanka. However, the film halls were reopened from 27 June 2020 and the film was re-released in film theaters.

== Cast ==
- Anuj Ranasinghe as Pawan Senanayake
- Harshi Anjumala as Hiruni Hansamali
- Cletus Mendis as CID Chief
- Damitha Abeyratne as Samanthi
- Ananda Athukorala as Mr. Samaranayake
- Thusitha Danushka as Shirash Ahamed
- Ryan Van Royan as Mohammad Azim
- Rajitha Hiran as Waiter
- Oshadhi Himasha in cameo appearance
- Sudesh Wasantha Peiris as Muslim leader Saheed Sarfaraz
- Nilu Manasa
- Menaka Arumapura as Fathima
- Mahinda Ihalagama
- Gayan Kanchana
- Manjula Senanayake
- Pabasara Sulochana
- Priyantha Muthukudaarachchi
- Yasodha Gunaratne
- Dilani Gunaratne

== Soundtrack ==
The film consists with two songs.

No.	Title	Lyrics	Singer(s)	Length
1.	"Seda Mawathe"	Harsha Udakanda	Manjula Siriwardena
2.	"Karume"	Ravishan Madappuli	Amila Muthugala, Ayomi Perera
