= Yakada Pihatu =

Yakada Pihatu යකඩ පිහාටු
- DVD poster
- Directed by: Udayakantha Warnasuriya
- Written by: Udayakantha Warnasuriya
- Produced by: EAP Films
- Starring: Ranjan Ramanayake; Anoja Weerasinghe; Semini Iddamalgoda
- Cinematography: Jayantha Gunawardena
- Edited by: Stanley de Alwis
- Music by: Ananda Perera
- Production companies: Prasad Color Lab, India
- Distributed by: EAP Theatres
- Release date: 27 August 2003
- Country: Sri Lanka
- Language: Sinhala

Yakada Pihatu (Iron Feathers) (Sinhala: යකඩ පිහාටු) is a 2003 Sri Lankan Sinhala action drama film directed by Udayakantha Warnasuriya and produced by Soma Edirisinghe for EAP Films. It stars Ranjan Ramanayake and Anoja Weerasinghe in lead roles along with Semini Iddamalgoda and Dilhani Ekanayake. Music for the film was composed by Ananda Perera.

The film was shot in Rambukkana, Kegalle Province. It is the 1016th Sri Lankan film in the Sinhala cinema.

== Plot ==
Nadeesha Kulasobana (played by Dilhani Ekanayake) is informed by the police that her fiancé, Romesh Jayawardena (Ranjan Ramanayake), has been hurt in an accident. She gets raped and murdered by three men while trying to visit her fiancé in hospital. After a trial, the three men are freed by the court. Romesh then finds and kills his fiancée's murderers before running away.

While traveling on a train, Romesh meets Manuja (Anoja Weerasinghe) and her son. They soon become friends and he visits her house in a rural village. Romesh spends his time helping Manuja and the villagers until he is tracked down and caught by the police. He is sentenced to serve time in prison. After he finishes his sentence, he visits the village again and they live happily ever after.

== Cast ==
- Ranjan Ramanayake as Romesh Jayawardena
- Anoja Weerasinghe as Manuja
- Sohan Warnasooriya as Pasindu
- Semini Iddamalgoda as Surangi
- Dilhani Ekanayake as Nadeesha Kulasobana
- D.B. Gangodathennaa as Manuja's mad stepfather
- Wilson Karunaratne as Gal Somey
- Suminda Sirisena as Wilson 'Aiyya'
- Quintus Weerakoon as Hector 'Loku Massina'
- Manike Attanayake as Loku Nena
- Nimal Anthony as Harry 'Mahaththaya'
- Somasiri Alakolange as Police Chief
- Somasiri Colombage as Gramasevaka
