= Jagath Benaragama =

Sri Lankan actor

Jagath Benaragama ජගත් බෙනරගම
- Born: Benaragama Vidanalage Jagath Champika Benaragama; June 2, 1972 (age 54)
- Occupations: Actor, Script writer, director
- Political party: Democratic Party
- Spouse: Renuka Pushpakumari Vithana (m. 2010)
- Relatives: Kokilani Benaragama (sister); Ravindra Yasas (brother-in-law); Kasun Chamara (cousin son)

Benaragama Vidanalage Jagath Champika Benaragama (born June 2, 1972 as ජගත් බෙනරගම) [Sinhala]), popularly known as Jagath Benaragama, is an actor in Sri Lankan cinema, television and theater. He is best known for the role Ukkuwa in Paba teledrama and the main protagonist in the critically acclaimed movie Prathiroo.

== Personal life ==
He is married to Renuka Pushpakumari Vithana, and the wedding ceremony was celebrated on 3 July 2010 at Paradise Inn Hotel, Delthawa, Piliyandala. His wife is from Hambantota district and worked in Ceylon Water Board. The couple has one daughter.

Jagath's sister Kokilani Benaragama is married to popular actor Ravindra Yasas. The couple has one son, Kasun Chamara who is also a renowned actor and singer, and started his career with musical the program Hapan Padura.

== Acting career ==
Benaragama started his career with a stage drama directed by Douglas Siriwardena. While acting, he also worked as an officer at the Presidential office. However, after a severe vehicle accident, he resigned from the office, where at that time, he is invited to play in a television serial by V. Sivadasan.

In 2014, Benaragama's character in television serial Pabasara, which was telecast on ITN has been theatrically killed as he is contesting from Sarath Fonseka's party in the election. He stated that this has happened intentionally because the channel is owned by the government and his election party is opposed to that.

=== Selected stage dramas ===
- Ransirige Sangramaya
- Meepura Wasiyo
- Thala Mala Pipila
- Guru Tharuva
- Andarela
- Sihina Walata Paatadenna
- Sellam Nirindu

=== Selected television serials ===
- Adaraya Ahasa Tharam
- Aparna
- Bhavana - Amuttha
- Brahma Muhurthiya as Rathnaya
- Chalo
- Damsaari
- Dangakara Tharu
- Deyyange Rate
- Diyawadana Maluwa
- Gini Avi Saha Gini Keli
- Hada Pudasuna
- Hopalu Arana
- Ihirunu Kiri
- Isuru Giri Tharanaya
- Kammiththa
- Kele Handa
- Maya Dunne
- Mama Saha Oba
- Nedeyo
- Nil Nethu
- Nisala Diya Sasala Viya
- Oba Mageya
- Paba as Ukkuwa
- Pabasara
- Parana Tawuma
- Pata Veeduru
- Pathok Paalama
- Purakalani
- Ransirige Sangramaya as Ransiri
- Sanda Nodutu Sanda
- Sansara Sakmana
- Saranganaa
- Sasara Ivuru
- Sithaka Mahima
- Sonduru Sitheththi as Liyana Mahaththaya
- Uthuwankande Sura Saradiyel
- Vasanthaya Avilla
- Vimukthi
- Vinivindimi

== Beyond acting ==
He has written two scripts, A Heenayata Awasarai and Laa Sanda Paamula. He directed a teledrama titled Sanda Nodutu Sanda.

Benaragama contested from Colombo district for the Western Provincial council elections.

== Filmography ==
Key
†	Denotes films that have not yet been released

Year	Film	Role	Ref.
1998	Gini Avi Saha Gini Keli	Attacked poster coverer	
1999	Nagaran	Ajith	
2000	Rajya Sevaya Pinisai	Dragged away shooter	
2003	Sudu Sewaneli		
2004	Bambara Sanakeli		
2005	Samanala Thatu	Drug dealer	
2008	Sandalu Thalen Eha		
2010	Sthuthi Nawatha Enna	Keerthirathna	
2010	Ira Handa Yata	LTTE Soldier	
2011	Gamani	Jagath	
2012	Prathiroo	Wickrama	
2012	Silent Letter (short film)		
2017	Cobbler's Dream (short film)		
2022	CineMa		
2024	Gini Avi Saha Gini Keli 2		
TBA	Rajanoo †		
TBA	Elakandiye Marcus †		
TBA	Angara †		
TBA	Magam Soli †		
TBA	Megha Warsha †		
