= Ran Kolla =

- Sinhala: රං කොල්ලා
- Directed by: Sumith Rathnayake
- Written by: Sumith Rathnayake
- Based on: Shanti Dissanayake's novel
- Produced by: Ma Films Lanka
- Starring: Okitha Damsath; Jayalath Manoratne; Iranganie Serasinghe; Chandani Seneviratne
- Music by: Darshana Ruwan Dissanayake
- Distributed by: EAP Films
- Release date: 18 November 2022
- Country: Sri Lanka
- Language: Sinhala

Ran Kolla (Sinhala: රං කොල්ලා; lit. 'Golden Boy') is a 2022 Sri Lankan Sinhala-language drama film directed by Sumith Rathnayake in his directorial cinema debut and produced by Madhuka Madawala for Ma Films Lanka. The film is based on the novel by the same name written by Shanti Dissanayake. It stars child actor Okitha Damsath with Jayalath Manoratne, Iranganie Serasinghe, and Chandani Seneviratne in lead roles along with Geetha Kanthi Jayakody, Hemasiri Liyanage, Sumith Rathnayake, Madani Malwattage in supportive roles.

The film was released on 18 November 2022. Before that, a special press screening was held at Tharangani Cinema Hall on 17 November 2022. The film received mixed reviews from critics.

== Plot ==
The film is based on a 5-year-old boy in a beautiful village close to Anuradhapura in the 1970s.

== Cast ==
- Okitha Damsath as Ran kolla
- Jayalath Manoratne as Kuda Rala
- Iranganie Serasinghe as Kavi amma
- Chandani Seneviratne as Gnanawathi
- Geetha Kanthi Jayakody as Ukku menika
- Hemasiri Liyanage as Thilakaratne's father
- Sarath Chandrasiri as Jayathuwa, the Yaka mama
- Susila Kottage as Kuda Rala's stepsister
- Sumith Rathnayake as Thilakarathna, Ran Kolla's father
- Madani Malwattage as Rankolla's elder mother
- Manjula Kumari as Ran kolla's mother
- Madhuka Madawala as Mangalika
- Anura Bandara Rajaguru as Kuda Rala's brother
- Nesta Maneth as Ukkun
- Subagi Kaulinya as Poddi

== Production ==
The film "Ran Kolla" made the directorial film debut for popular actor Sumith Rathnayake who previously directed two award-winning television serials: Maddahana and Maha Polowa. He also made the script, screenplay and song lyrics of the film. The film was produced by popular actress, and announcer Madhuka Madawala, who also contributed with Costume Design, Production and Production Management.

Co-Production done by Jaliya Samarakkodi, Production Contribution by Bandula Ekanayake, and direction assisted by W. Ravindra and Vernon Abeysinghe. Cinematography and Still Photography done by Thisara Thulwan with the assistance by Ananda Bandara Herath, Dilipa Rangana Amarasinghe, Muditha Withanage, Kasun Vimukthi Wickramasinghe, Mevan Nishantha Punchiheva, and Prasad Dayaratne. Jagath Weeratunga is the editor, Priyantha Dissanayake made feature composition and hair designs, whereas Bandula Weerasekera is the art director, Sashika Ruwan Marasinghe made sound design, and Dinindu Jagoda with color combination.

Darshana Ruwan Dissanayake is the music director, where Sashika Nisansala, Saman Lenin, Dulma Shankhabima Dissanayake made background vocals.
