= Leopard Do Not Bite =

- Poster
- සංසාරේ දඩයක්කාරයා
- Directed by: Prasanna Jayakody
- Written by: Prasanna Jayakody
- Based on: novel by Simon Navagattegama
- Produced by: Rashitha Jinasena
- Starring: Sanjeewa Upendra; Hemasiri Liyanage; Christina Britto
- Cinematography: Vishwa Balasooriya
- Edited by: Rangana Sinharage; Jeewantha Gunathilake
- Music by: Sumudu Guruge
- Distributed by: Mountain River Films
- Release dates: October 2015 (Busan); 4 July 2019
- Running time: 75 minutes
- Country: Sri Lanka
- Language: Sinhala
- Budget: $200,000

Leopard Do Not Bite (Sinhalese: Sansare Dadayakkaraya (සංසාරේ දඩයක්කාරයා)) is a 2015 Sri Lankan drama film directed by Prasanna Jayakody and co-produced by Rashitha Jinasena, Kapila de Silva and Wasantha Bandara. The film starring Sanjeewa Upendra, Hemasiri Liyanage, and Christina Britto. It depicts a conflict between a monk and a hunter, giving a ground to a philosophical exploration of death's place in life. The story was inspired by Simon Navagattegama's novel Dadayakkaraya’s story. It was screened at 20th Busan International Film Festival 2015.

== Cast ==
- Sanjeewa Upendra as Hunter
- Hemasiri Liyanage as Monk
- Christina Britto as Gomaree
- Isuru Navod
- Thusitha Laknath

== Synopsis ==
Dadayakkaraya depicts a clash between a philosophy of the one who lives in a jungle and hunts wild animals as fodder for the people and that of the one who lives in a temple and hunts people as fodder for a religion.

== Plot ==
The temple nestles in the folds of a dense jungle. The path from the village to the temple runs through it. In the name of merit and demerit, the villagers bow to the word of the monk. The only exception is the hunter who lives in the jungle. It is him who provides all of the meat required by the people in the village. And yet, he eats no meat.

It is the month of Vesak, and Gomari slips out of a group listening to a sermon to frolic with her paramour in the jungle. There they both fall prey to a leopard. The hunter, fully aware of what goes on under the jungle canopy informs the monk that the leopard had attacked Gomari and has now tasted human blood. He earnestly requests the monk to refrain from asking the people to come to the temple on Vesak Poya (full moon) day fearing that they too would fall victim to this leopard. The monks leaves such matters to fate (karma) and firmly refuses to stop the sila (observation of precept) program scheduled for the day.

Finally, the hunter, who never kills anything except as food for people, is forced to kill the hungry leopard as it hunts for prey even as the monk is delivering his sermon to the villagers on Vesak full moon day.

When the monk and the hunter go into the jungle the next day, all they see are the rotting corpses of Gomari and the monk.
