= Sandalu Thalen Eha =

Sandalu Thalen Eha සඳලු තලයෙන් එහා
- Directed by: Gamini Pushpakumara
- Written by: Gamini Pushpakumara
- Produced by: Super Films
- Starring: Jagath Benaragama; Asela Jayakody; Buddhika Indurugalla
- Cinematography: Buddhika Mangala
- Edited by: Sri Akalanka Jayasinghe
- Music by: Chaminda Malan
- Distributed by: Rithma and LFD Theatres
- Release date: 1 August 2008
- Country: Sri Lanka
- Language: Sinhala

Sandalu Thalen Eha (Sinhala: සඳලු තලයෙන් එහා) is a 2008 Sri Lankan Sinhala action thriller film directed and produced by Gamini Pushpakumara for Super Films. It stars Jagath Benaragama and Asela Jayakody in lead roles along with G.R Perera and Buddhika Indurugalla. Music composed by Chaminda Malan. The film recorded as the first all-male Sri Lankan movie to be screened. It is the 1110th Sri Lankan film in the Sinhala cinema.

== Cast ==
- Jagath Benaragama
- G.R Perera
- Asela Jayakody
- Buddhika Indurugalla
- Mapalagama Wimalaratne
- Kapila Sigera
- Podinilame Dedunu Pitiya
- Dilip Wickramasinghe
- Chamikara Bokaragoda
- Kumara Ranepura
- Vathika Perera
