= Wekande Walauwa =

2002 Sri Lankan drama film

Wekande Walauwa වෑකන්ද වලව්ව
- Ravindra, Malini, Paboda and Vasanthi starring.
- Directed by: Lester James Peries
- Screenplay by: Lester James Peries
- Produced by: Asoka Perera; Chandran Rutnam
- Starring: Malini Fonseka; Ravindra Randeniya; Vasanthi Chathurani
- Cinematography: K.A. Dharmasena
- Edited by: Gladwin Fernando
- Music by: Pradeep Ratnayake
- Release date: 22 May 2003
- Country: Sri Lanka
- Language: Sinhala

Wekande Walauwa (Mansion by the Lake) (Sinhala: වෑකන්ද වලව්ව) is a 2002 Sri Lankan Sinhalese language drama film directed by Lester James Peries. It stars Malini Fonseka, Vasanthi Chathurani, Sanath Gunathilake, Paboda Sandeepani, and Ravindra Randeniya. It was produced by Asoka Perera and Chandran Rutnam, and its score was composed by Pradeep Ratnayake.

The story, based on Anton Chekhov's play The Cherry Orchard (1904), depicts conflict within a wealthy Sri Lankan family. The film was screened out of competition at the 2003 Cannes Film Festival. It was Sri Lanka's first ever submission for voting in the Academy Awards.

== Cast ==
- Malini Fonseka as Sujata Rajasuriya
- Ravindra Randeniya as Lucas
- Vasanthi Chathurani as Sita
- Sanath Gunathilake as Gunapala
- Paboda Sandeepani as Aruni
- Iranganie Serasinghe as Aunt Catherine
- Lucky Dias as Muthugoda, a lawyer
- Elson Divithurugama as Gabriel
- Senaka Wijesinghe as Student Activist
- Ranjith Rubasinghe as Student Activist
- Chitra Warakagoda

== Production ==
The film was shot in the Bandaragama, Piliyandala and Panadura areas of Sri Lanka.

== Release ==
The film was screened at the grand finale of the Asian Film Festival in Mumbai on August 10, 2002. Its initial release was delayed due to the Sri Lankan parliamentary election on April 2, 2003.

== Reception ==
Wekande Walauwa was Sri Lanka's first ever submission for voting in the Academy Awards, competing in the Best Foreign Language Film category for the 75th ceremony in 2003. The film received the Golden Felini Award from UNESCO.

== Notes ==
- Film Review in Spirituality & Health by Frederic and Mary Ann Brussat
- Film Review in Slant Magazine
- Film de Culte
- Page in Rotten Tomatoes
- Asiatica Film Mediale 2003
- Le Domaine
- Asia-Pacific Arts

== See also ==
- List of Academy Award winners and nominees for Best International Feature Film
- Lester James Peries
