= Sankranthi (2007 film) =

Sankranthi සංක්‍රාන්ති
- Directed by: Anuruddha Jayasinghe
- Written by: Prof. Nimal Senanayake
- Produced by: N.S Productions
- Starring: Sangeetha Weeraratne; W. Jayasiri; Bimal Jayakody
- Cinematography: Ruwan Costa
- Edited by: Rukmal Nirosh; Ajith Ramanayake
- Music by: Navaratne Gamage
- Release date: 11 May 2007
- Running time: CEL Theatres
- Country: Sri Lanka
- Language: Sinhala

Sankranthi (The Tender Trap) (Sinhala: සංක්‍රාන්ති) is a 2007 Sri Lankan Sinhala drama film directed by Anuruddha Jayasinghe and co-produced by Prof. Nimal Senanayake and Dr. Withana P. Somasiri for N.S Productions. It stars Sangeetha Weeraratne, W. Jayasiri and Bimal Jayakody in lead roles along with Giriraj Kaushalya and Sunil Hettiarachchi. Music composed by Navaratne Gamage. The film was screened at 34th International Indian Film Festival in World Cinema category and also won numerous awards at film festivals. It is the 1165th Sri Lankan film in the Sinhala cinema.

The film was screened at the 34th International Indian Film Festival in December 2006.

== Cast ==
- Sangeetha Weeraratne as Pam
- W. Jayasiri as Dr. Gerad
- Bimal Jayakody as Sunimal
- Giriraj Kaushalya
- Sunil Hettiarachchi
- Hemasiri Liyanage
- Seetha Kumari
