= Ira Handa Yata =

- Sinhala: ඉර හඳ යට
- Directed by: Bennett Rathnayake
- Written by: Bennett Rathnayake; Sarath Gamlath
- Produced by: Ben Films
- Starring: Dharshani Tasha; Udara Rathnayake; Jagath Benaragama
- Cinematography: Kalinga Deshapriya Vithanage
- Music by: Rohana Weerasinghe; Nadeeka Guruge
- Distributed by: EAP Theaters
- Release dates: April 2010 (Singapore International Film Festival); 2 September 2010
- Country: Sri Lanka
- Language: Sinhala

Ira Handa Yata (Under the Sun and Moon) (Sinhala: ඉර හඳ යට) is a 2010 Sri Lankan Sinhala war drama film directed by Bennett Rathnayake and co-produced by Samanmalee Hewamanna and Bennett Rathnayake for Ben Films. It stars two debutantes Dharshani Tasha, and Udara Rathnayake in lead roles along with Saumya Liyanage, Jagath Benaragama and Damitha Abeyratne in supportive roles. Music co-composed by Rohana Weerasinghe and Nadeeka Guruge. It is the 1144th film in the Sri Lankan cinema.

The premiere screening of the film was held at 23rd Singapore International Film Festival. The film received positive reviews from critics. The screenplay and some critics reviews were released at 3 November 2010 at Mahaweli Centre, Colombo 7 at 3 pm.

== Cast ==
- Dharshani Tasha as Kiruba Devi
- Udara Rathnayake as Corporal Rakhitha
- Saumya Liyanage as Officer Mahasen
- Damitha Abeyratne as LTTE female cadre
- Jagath Benaragama as LTTE Soldier
- Sheryl Decker as Rekha, Rakhitha's fiancée
- Darshan Dharmaraj as LTTE soldier
- Sathischandra Edirisinghe as Monk
- Kaushalya Fernando as Bhanu
- Kriz Chris Henri Harriz as James Billworth NGO Worker
- Bimal Jayakody as LTTE area leader
- Mahendra Perera as Nimal
- Rangana Premaratne as Major
- Chandani Seneviratne as Sachitra
- Veena Jayakody
- Roger Seneviratne
- Palitha Silva as Lieutenant Silva
- Suminda Sirisena as Trader
- Kumara Thirimadura as Captain
- Suvineetha Weerasinghe as Herath Manike

== Soundtrack ==
No.	Title	Singer(s)	Length
1.	"Thuthi Geethikawaka"	Nadeeka Guruge

== Awards ==
- 2010 Los Angeles Film Festival Special Jury Honorary Award
