= Asela Jayakody =

Sri Lankan actor (1971–2011)

- අසේල ජයකොඩි
- Born: April 20, 1971; Colombo, Sri Lanka
- Died: November 27, 2011 (aged 40); Negambo
- Education: Karunaratne Buddhist School, Mattumagala
- Occupations: Actor, Dramatist
- Years active: 1998–2011
- Spouse: Chandani Jayakody
- Children: 2

Asela Jayakody (20 April 1971 – 27 November 2011 as අසේල ජයකොඩි) [Sinhala]) was an actor in Sri Lankan cinema, stage drama, and television. Notable works of his career included acting in the films Gamani and Salelu Warama.

He died on 27 November 2011 in an accident in Welisara at the age of 40.

== Personal life ==
He was born on 20 April 1971 in Colombo as the youngest of the family. His father, Wilfred Jayakody was a popular artist. His mother was Clera Bridget Jayakody (Née Senevirathne). He completed his education from Karunaratne Buddhist School, Mattumagala. At the time of his death, he was a father of two children: daughter Rishni Jayakody and son Binura Jayakody.

== Acting career ==
Jayakody started his drama career since school times. In 1998, along with another fellow actor Gihan Fernando, he went to a workshop conducted by Jayalal Rohana. Then, both were lucky to act in the stage drama, Bhoothawesha. He played vital roles in many television serials such as Synthetic Dreams, Romeo and Juliet Story, Fantasy Avenue, Sapiriwara, Sisila Ima, Sathkulu Pawwa, Gajamuthu, Ithin Eta Passe and Holman Bottuwa.

Jayakody started his film career with Vasantha Obeysekera's 2002 film Salelu Warama. Then he acted more than 10 films until his death in 2011. His most popular cinema acting came through films Salelu Warama, Gamani and Ran Kevita 2.

=== Television serials ===
- Arundathi
- Bath Amma
- Dadu Kete
- Deveni Athmaya
- Dhawala Yamaya
- Fantasy Avenue
- Gajamuthu
- Gini Weluma
- Hada Pudasuna
- Holman Bottuwa
- Ithin Eta Passe
- Kaha Ira Pamula
- Katu Kurullo
- Kethumathi Neyo
- Pini Bindu
- Rathi Virathi
- Romeo and Juliet Story
- Sandagira
- Sandali Saha Radika
- Sapirivara
- Sara
- Sathkulu Pawwa
- Sihina Aran Enna
- Siri Sirimal
- Sisila Ima
- Star Sri Lanka Histhanak
- Synthetic Dreams
- Wali Mankada

== Death ==
On of 27 November 2011 at about 4 am, his car was parked along the Colombo –Negombo road by facing Negombo and after having had some dealings. After it, he with a friend had tried to enter the vehicle to go to his residence in Nagoda, Kandana. At that moment, a speeding vehicle had knocked both of them, where the vehicle had fled. He was rushed to the Ragama Hospital with serious injuries where he died before admitting to the hospital. His friend however survived with fatal injuries and transferred to The Colombo National Hospital for further treatments.

His funeral took place on 30 November 2011, Wednesday afternoon at the Kandana Nagoda St. John Baptist burial grounds.

== Filmography ==
- No. denotes the Number of Sri Lankan film in the Sri Lankan cinema.

Year	No.	Film	Role	Ref.
2002	990	Salelu Warama	Suren's roommate	
2002	992	Rosa Patikki		
2003	1015	Sonduru Dadabima	Captain Wickrama	
2008	1110	Sandalu Thalen Eha	Evil police officer	
2010	1141	Sthuthi Nawatha Enna		
2010	1143	Ape Yalu Punchi Boothaya	Premaratne	
2010	1145	Sara		
2011	1160	Gamani	Head Grama Arakshaka	
2013	1192	Ran Kevita 2	Thief	
2015	1222	Bora Diya Pokuna		
2019		Bhavatharana		

=== Raigam Tele'es Awards ===
Year	Nominee / work	Award	Result
2008	Jury Appreciation Award	Acting	Won
