= Vasanthi Chathurani =

Sri Lankan actress and producer (born 1959)

Vasanthi Chathurani වසන්ති චතුරානි
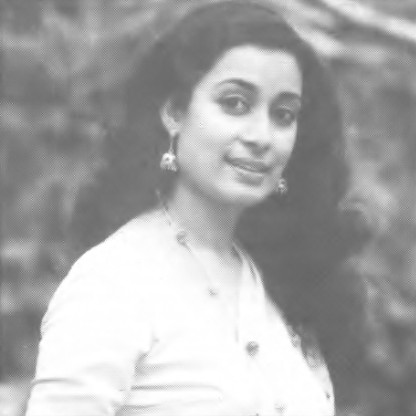
- Born: Vasantha Doreen Peterson; 18 October 1959 (age 66); Gampaha, Sri Lanka
- Education: Holy Cross Convent; Holy Cross College Gampaha
- Occupations: Actress, producer
- Years active: 1978–present
- Spouse: Kumarasiri Gunawardhana
- Children: Kavinda Gunawardhana
- Parents: Stanley Peterson (father); Lilavathi Peterson (mother)
- Awards: Best Actress

Vasantha Doreen Peterson (born 18 October 1959: Sinhala: වසන්ති චතුරානි), popularly known as Vasanthi Chathurani, is an actress in Sri Lankan cinema and television. An extremely natural actress, Vasanthi Chathurani is one of the most successful personalities on Sri Lanka's silver and small screen. At the age 16, she made her debut as a teenager in Sumitra Peiris's Gehenu Lamai.

== Personal life ==
She was born on 18 October 1959 in Bandarawatta, Gampaha, Sri Lanka. Her father Stanley Peterson, served in the Army, and her mother Lilavathi Peterson, died when she was a child. She had one older sister, Vinita Helen. Both of them grew up in the house of her grandmother, Maggie Nona and grandfather, K.K. Albert. She completed education from Holy Cross Convent, Gampaha.

At the age of 20, she married the businessman Kumarasiri Gunawardhana on October 18, 1981 by an arbitrary decision. They have one son named Kavinda Asanga Gunawardena, a graphic designer. Her husband died suddenly on February 10, 1992, when Vasanthi was 33 years old.

== Career ==
Chathurani was a school girl when director Sumitra Peiris chose her for a lead role in Gehenu Lamai in 1978. Her most acclaimed role in the silver screen was that of 'Nirmala', a mentally-ill girl in the blockbuster Ganga Addara opposite late Vijaya Kumaratunga in 1980. She was mere nineteen-year-old at that time. I 1981, she was awarded Best Actress for her performance in this film, at the Sarasaviya Awards Festival and Presidential Awards.

She won the Sumathi Most Popular Actress Award in 1997 and the Sumathi Best Teledrama Actress Award in 1998, 2002 and 2009. Her career came to a temporary halt, when she got married in 1979, but was once again welcomed by her fans with her performance in Adara Hasuna. Some of her other successful films include Gehenu Lamai, Duwata Mawaka Misa and Sudu Sevanali. Vasanthi played dramatic roles in the films Amal Biso, Siribo Aiya, Hansa Vilak and Bththi Hathara. In 2003, she starred in the Lester James Peiris drama film Wekande Walauwa which received critic acclaim.

Chathurani also made her mark as a teledrama actress, in shows such as Māyā Mandira, Iṭipahan, Chala Achala, Durgānthaya, Giraya, Hingana Kollā, Kadulla, Gajaman Nōnā and Kulavamiya. Chathurani recently got into teledrama productions, financing successful teledramas such as Aga Pipi Mal, Sedona and Ranga Soba. All three of them were directed by Premakumara Jayawardene and written by Sumitra Rahubadde. She has acted many genre television serials in Sri Lanka.

=== Selected TV serials ===
- Aga Pipi Mal
- Dahas Gawdura
- Denuwara Manike
- Dhawala Kadulla
- Diya Matha Ruwa
- Durganthaya
- Gajaman Nona.
- Giraya
- Idorayaka Mal Pipila
- Ilandariyo
- Ira Handa Payana Lokaya
- Itipahan
- Kadulla
- Kulawamiya
- Mano Mandira
- Pem Piyawara
- Ranga Madala Samu Gani
- Ranga Soba
- Sedona
- Senehase Geethaya
- Senehase Nimnaya
- Ulamage Rathriya
- Uththamavi
- Walakulu
- Yaddehi Gedara
- Yaso Mandira

== Filmography ==
Key
| † | Denotes films that have not yet been released |

| Year | Film | Role | Ref. |
|---|---|---|---|
| 1978 | Gehenu Lamai | Kusum Liyanage | |
| 1978 | Ahasin Polowata | Pushpa's sister | |
| 1979 | Amal Biso | | |
| 1979 | Chuda Manikya | Vajira | |
| 1980 | Siribo Ayya | Biso | |
| 1980 | Parithyaga | Rohini | |
| 1980 | Ganga Addara | Nirmala Atapattu | |
| 1980 | Para Dige | Madhu | |
| 1980 | Hewanali Ada Minissu | Piyawathi | |
| 1980 | Hansa Vilak | Samanthi Weerasinghe | |
| 1981 | Samawenna | Nimalka 'Nimmi' | |
| 1982 | Ayachana | Sarojini | |
| 1982 | Biththi Hathara | Mallika | |
| 1984 | Kakille Rajjuruwo | Daughter | |
| 1986 | Dinuma | Sujatha Senarath | |
| 1986 | Aadara Hasuna | | |
| 1987 | Mangala Thegga | Thilina | |
| 1988 | Satana | | |
| 1990 | Saharawe Sihinaya | | |
| 1990 | Madhu Sihina | Madhu | |
| 1990 | Himagiri | Menaka Abeydheera | |
| 1990 | Wana Bambara | | |
| 1990 | Awaragira | Vasantha | |
| 1991 | Uthura Dakuna | Sarojani | |
| 1991 | Raja Sellan | | |
| 1992 | Sinha Raja | | |
| 1992 | Kiyala Wadak Na | Kushari | |
| 1992 | Kula Geya | Suchithra | |
| 1992 | Sargant Nallathambi | Kalawathi | |
| 1993 | Sasara Sarisarana Thek Oba Mage | | |
| 1994 | Ambu Samiyo | Subhadra | |
| 1994 | Dhawala Pushpaya | Soba | |
| 1995 | Awaragira | Wasantha | |
| 1996 | Raththaran Malli | | |
| 1996 | Thunweni Ahe | | |
| 1997 | Duwata Mawaka Misa | | |
| 1997 | Punaruthpaththiya | | |
| 1997 | Visidela | Police Inspector's Daughter | |
| 1998 | Julietge Bhumikawa | Saroja | |
| 1999 | Bahu Bharya | Navoda | |
| 2001 | Kinihiriya Mal | Renuka | |
| 2001 | Poronduwa | Pooja | |
| 2002 | Sansara Prarthana | | |
| 2002 | Sudu Sewaneli | Podi Menika | |
| 2003 | Wekande Walauwa | Sita | |
| 2003 | Sakman Maluwa | | |
| 2004 | Sumedha | Sumedha | |
| 2007 | Yahaluvo | Burgher music teacher. Also as playback singer | |
| 2011 | Challenges | Ranuk's mother | |
| 2018 | Vaishnavee | Laxmi's mother | |
| 2019 | Sangile | Lady monk | |
| TBA | Kondadeniye Hamuduruwo † | | |
| TBA | Gunananda Himi Migettuwatte † | | |

== Awards ==
=== Sarasaviya Awards ===
| Year | Nominee / work | Award | Result |
|---|---|---|---|
| 1980 | Ganga Addara | Best Actress | Won |

=== Sumathi Awards ===
| Year | Nominee / work | Award | Result |
|---|---|---|---|
| 1997 | People's Vote | Most Popular Actress | Won |
| 1998 | Durganthaya | Best Actress | Won |
| 2002 | Kulawamiya | Best Actress | Won |
| 2006 | Aga Pipi Mal | Best Actress | Won |

=== Raigam Tele'es ===
| Year | Nominee / work | Award | Result |
|---|---|---|---|
| 2005 | Sedona | Best Actress | Won |
| 2006 | Aga Pipi Mal | Best Actress | Won |
