= Palitha Silva =

Sri Lankan actor

Palitha Silva පාලිත සිල්වා
- Born: Garanduwa Baarage Palitha Silva; 31 August 1967 (age 59); Sri Lanka
- Occupation: Actor
- Years active: 1984–present
- Spouse: Namalee Silva
- Children: 4
- Awards: Best Actor/ most popular actor

Garanduwa Baarage Palitha Silva (born August 30, 1967, as පාලිත සිල්වා) [Sinhala]) is a Sri Lankan actor, dramatist, producer, director, scriptwriter, and author.

He started his career at 15 when he was chosen to train at the Professor Solomon Fonseka's school of Acting. Silva has acted in more than 400 television serials and is best known for his roles in the teledramas Keetaya, Deweni Inima, and as the lead actor in the biographical film Anagarika Dharmapala Srimathano.

In June 2019, he was awarded the honorific title Maanava Hithavadee Keerthi Sri Veeraputra Deshabandu and then Kalaashubana Janaranjana Keerthi Sri Deshamanya in July 2021 for his service towards Buddhism in Sri Lanka.

== Personal life ==
He is married to his longtime partner, Namalee Silva. She is the Deputy Chief Superintendent of the Marketing Division of Sri Lanka Insurance. She went to Holy Family Convent in Bambalapitiya and Devi Balika Vidyalaya in Colombo. Then Namalee graduated with a marketing degree from the Chartered Institute of Marketing, London. She knew Palitha since 10 years of age. They both lived in the same village, Mount Lavinia and both attended the same Dhamma School, Mount Lavinia Dhammodaya Dhamma School.

== Theater career ==
His entry to theater and drama came through Dharmasiri Bandaranayake's drama Ekadhipathy. Winning his first state youth award for script writing, directing and acting in Thawath ek wiroopiyek, at the young age of 16, in 1983, at 18 years old, he went on to act in Sri Lanka's most critically acclaimed stage drama Sargent Nallathambi alongside Nihal Silva. . Silva also studied and acted under the directorship of Helena Lehtimäki in her productions of Bertolt Brecht's Mr Puntila and his Man Matti and William Shakespeare's Midsummer Night's Dreams. In 1988, Silva was nominated for the best actor award at the National State Drama festival for playing the character of Estragon in a production of Samuel Beckette's Waiting for Godot. In 1994, Silva won the Best Actor Award at the State Drama festival for Kaspa.

In 1984, his maiden theater direction came through the play Ballangen Pravesam Wenu., the play gained much awards and accolades at the National Youth Drama festival. He also directed stage plays for many schools such as Holy Family Convent, Bambalapitiya and S. Thomas' College, Mount Lavinia. He has also worked with many British and German dramatists.

After 28 years, he directed another stage play called Circus Karayo, which was first presented at Lionel Wendt Theater on 31 July 2012.

=== Notable works ===
- Ekadhipathy
- Ballangen Pravesam Wenu
- Circus Karayo
- Security Sinnathambi
- Sihina Deshayen
- Saree Gete
- Caspaar - accompany with German dramatist
- Kelani Palama
- Sihina Rangahala

== Television career ==
In 1998, Silva directed the tele film, Amuththek Awith which won awards. In 2000, he directed Thrasthawadinge Ghathanaya for Swarnavahini. He became more popular through the drama mystery television serial Keetaya which was telecasted on Independent Television Network. Currently, he acting in the soap opera Deweni Inima as cricket coach.

=== Notable works ===
- Abhisamaya
- Ada Ada Ei Maru
- Adaraneeya Amma
- Ahasin Watuna Gahaniyak
- Ambu Daruwo
- Apuru Sahodaraya
- Asanwara Wessak
- Athma Senehasa
- Chanchala Rekha
- Chandra Vinsathi
- Dambulugala Sakmana
- Dedunu Sihina (2008)
- Deweni Inima as Ekanayake Sir (2016-2019)
- Diya Matha Ruwa
- Diya Sewaneli
- Diya Suliya
- Durganthaya
- Eka Iththaka Mal
- Gamane ya (2020)
- Ganga Addara Kele
- Gini Avi Saha Gini Keli (2014)
- Golu Hadawatha
- Guru Geethaya
- Ira Awara (2015)
- Jeewithaya Horu Aran
- Kadupul Mal (2002)
- Kampitha Vill (2008)
- Katu Imbula as Sugatha Banda
- Keetaya 1,2,3,4
- Kinnara Damanaya
- Kiripabalu Vila
- Mahathala Hatana (2007)
- Magul Sakwala (1998) as Senaka
- Manikkawatha
- Maya Ranaga
- Maya Roo (2010)
- Mayura Asapuwa
- Meeduma (2003)
- Mini Palanga (2003)
- Nidikumba Mal
- Nil Mal Viyana (2004)
- Nim Walalla
- Once Upon a Time in Colombo (2021)
- Paata Kurullo (2024)
- Pethi Ahulana Mala
- Piniwassa
- Ran Poruwa
- Roda Hatara Manamalaya (2004)
- Romeo And Dante (2012)
- Samanalayano
- Sanda Gomman Re (2007)
- Sanda Sanda Wage
- Sayaweni Patumaga
- Senakeliyay Maya
- Shoba (2007)
- Sikuru Udanaya (1998)
- Sinasenna Mata
- Sisila Ima
- Situ Gedara
- Sivusiya Gawwa (2001)
- Sudu Kaluwara as Dingiri Banda (2003)
- Suseema as Ranga (1980s)
- Suwanda Hamana Manamali
- Thalaya Soyana Geethaya (2005)
- Urumayaka Aragalaya (2018)
- Veera Puran Appu (2017–18)
- Vinivindimi
- Visi Ekwana Horawa
- Wanawadule Wasanthaya (2000)
- Wara Peraliya (2005)
- Wes Benduma (2003)
- Yuga Wilakkuwa (1997)

== Beyond acting ==
He worked as the Workshop director of The Young Learners' Center at the British Council. He stated that his greatest ambition is to be a writer. He has published two novels, E Deegeka Giyaya in 1998 and the Athek Barata Henduvak on 8 October 2004. He also works as director, scriptwriter and a lecturer on cinematography.

== Filmography ==
Silva started his film career with Kawuluwa in 1987, directed by Jackson Anthony with a minor role. His most popular cinema acting came through films Sir Last Chance, Anagarika Dharmapala Srimathano and Maharaja Ajasath. The role in Maharaja Ajasath as Arahat Devadatta was highly praised by the critics. He was also cast in the international film Shadow of the Cobra starring Art Malik, Michael Woods and Arthur Dignam.

Key
†	Denotes films that have not yet been released

Year	Film	Role	Ref.
1987	Kawuluwa		
1993	Sargent Nallathambi	Nanapala	
1994	Ekada Wahi		
1994	Nohadan Landune		
1995	Edath Chandiya Adath Chandiya		
1995	Maruthaya	Dinesh	
1996	Sihina Desayen		
1996	Hiru Sanduta Medi Wee		
1998	Gini Avi Saha Gini Keli	Willie	
1999	Seetha Sameere	Janaka	
2000	Sanda Yahanata		
2000	Anuragaye Ananthaya	Kamal Kanchana Swarnadipathi	
2003	Le Kiri Kandulu	Prosecutor	
2003	Sudu Kaluwara	Dingiri Banda	
2005	Sulanga	Siripala	
2006	Ammawarune	AGA officer	
2008	Walapatala	Chartin	
2009	Sir Last Chance	Don Ladan 'George Washingpowder'	
2010	Kshema Bhoomi	Anura Suriyabandara	
2010	Ira Handa Yata	Lieutenant Silva	
2010	Kawulu Dora		
2011	Sinhawalokanaya	Heen Appo	
2012	Kusa Pabha	King Madu	
2012	Daruwane	Doctor	
2012	Prathiroo	Buddhist monk	
2013	Siri Parakum	King Vijayabahu III	
2014	Anagarika Dharmapala Srimathano	Anagarika Dharmapala	
2014	Parapura	Police officer Sathyapala	
2014	Api Marenne Na	Manoj Amarajeewa	
2015	Maharaja Ajasath	Rev. Devadatta Thero	
2016	Sinhaya	Sabhapathithuma	
2017	Nilanjana	Dananjaya	
2017	Nimnayaka Hudekalawa	Army officer	
2018	Nela		
2018	Nidahase Piya DS	F. R. Senanayake	
2019	President Super Star		
2022	Hithumathe Jeewithe	Marasinghe	
2024	Gini Avi Saha Gini Keli 2	Nihal	
TBA	Surangana Lowin Awilla †	Jayashan's Father	
TBA	Gunananda Himi Migettuwatte †		
TBA	Thanapathilage Gedara †		
TBA	Adventures of Ricky Deen †	Heavies	
TBA	Tharu Athara †		
TBA	Marukathara †		
TBA	Pashchima Yamaya †		
TBA	Oscar †		

== Awards and accolades ==
He has won several awards at the local stage drama festivals and television festivals, both for acting and direction.

=== Awards ===
Year	Nominee / work	Award	Result
	Induru Dora	Best Actor	Nominated
	Durganathaya	Best Actor	Nominated
	Gamata Amuththek Avith	Best Stage Actor	Won
	Gamata Amuththek Avith	Best Single-Episode Director	Won
