= Ran Kevita 2 =

- Sinhala: රන් කෙවිට
- Directed by: Udayakantha Warnasuriya
- Written by: Udayakantha Warnasuriya
- Produced by: Millenium Entertainments
- Starring: Hisham Samsudeen; Harith Samarasinghe; Ananda Wickramage
- Cinematography: Pravin Jayarathne
- Edited by: Pravin Jayarathne
- Music by: Mahesh Denipitiya
- Production company: Sunflower films
- Distributed by: NFC & CEL Theaters
- Release date: 23 August 2013
- Country: Sri Lanka
- Language: Sinhala

Ran Kevita 2, distributed as Ran Kevita II - Gopaluge Wickrama in CEL and NFC Theatres, (Sinhala: රන් කෙවිට 2) is a 2013 Sri Lankan Sinhala children's fantasy film directed by Udayakantha Warnasuriya and co-produced by Pravin Jayarathne, Ranjith Jayasooriya, Janitha Marasinghe and Udayakantha Warnasuriya for Millenium Entertainments. It is the sequel to 2007 film Ran Kevita directed by the same director. It stars Hisham Samsudeen and Harith Samarasinghe in lead roles along with Ananda Wickramage and Asela Jayakody. Music composed by Mahesh Denipitiya. It is the 1192nd Sri Lankan film in the Sinhala cinema.

The film has been shot in and around Colombo with the latest camera technology of Red camera.

== Plot ==
Suran goes to town to spend the next vacation with Janith, and he takes Gopalu Yaka with him. They manage to hide Gopalu in the house but in town the demon hardly gets any place to hide from the sunlight which is unbearable to him. However at night, Gopalu become normal and active.

== Cast ==
- Isham Samsoodeen as Janith
- Harith Samarasinghe as Suran
- Suneth Chithrananda as Gopalu (voice)
- Ananda Wickramage as Suran's father
- Susantha Chandramali as Suran's mother
- Bennett Rathnayake as Janith's father
- Sangeetha Basnayake as Janith's mother
- Madushani Janatree as Janith's sister
- Damitha Saluwadana as Sundari amma
- Asela Jayakody as Thief
- Don Gai as Thief
- Ananda Athukorala as Police sergeant
- Kumara Thirimadura as Supermarket thief
- Janesh Silva as Police sergeant
- Chathura Perera as Anton
- Nilmini Kottegoda as Complaint
- Chaminda Vaas in cameo appearance

== Soundtrack ==
No.	Title	Singer(s)	Length
1.	"Katath Majic Wage"	Himasha Manupriya, Eshan Denipitiya
2.	"Ran Ran Ran Ran Kevita"	Himasha Manupriya, Eshan Denipitiya

== Box office ==
The film successfully passed 75 days of screening and more than 6 lakhs of people have been watched the movie at that period.
