= Udara Rathnayake =

Sri Lankan filmmaker

Udara Rathnayake උදාර රත්නායක
- Born: June 21, 1986 (age 40); Colombo, Sri Lanka
- Education: D. S. Senanayake College; Stafford International School
- Alma mater: University of Colombo; University of Essex
- Occupations: Actor, politician
- Years active: 1986–present
- Political party: United National Party
- Spouse: Dinali Kariyapperuma (m. 2015)
- Children: 1
- Parents: Bennett Rathnayake (father); Samanmalee Hawapanna (mother)

Udara Rathnayake is an actor in Sri Lankan cinema and television as well as a businessman and politician by profession. He is most notable for the roles in films Ira Handa Yata and Nela directed by his father.

== Personal life ==
He was born on 21 June 1986 as the second of the family. His father Bennett Rathnayake is a veteran film director who has produced several critically acclaimed award-winning films. His mother Samanmalee Hawapanna is a film producer. Udara has one elder sister, Erandathi; and one younger sister, Bhagya, both are actresses.

Educated at D. S. Senanayake College and then Stafford International School, Rathnayake did his Undergraduate in the UK at the University of Essex in Business Management. Upon completing his degree he returned to Sri Lanka he completed a master's degree in Development and Politics at the University of Colombo.

== Acting career ==
Udara started his career as an actor, with many lead roles in Sinhala Teledramas, Udara also acted in movies, with the lead role in the movie Ira Handa Yata. It is for this role that he was nominated for the best performance at Singapore Film Festival.

== Political career ==
He is a graduate of University of Essex and University of Colombo. He won a seat on the Western Provincial Council after running for election in the Western Province Council Elections in 2014 under the United National Party.

He is a founding member of Sri Lanka United and currently serving as the Vice President of the United National Party-affiliated Young Professionals Association. He ran for the 2014 Western Provincial Council elections under the United National Party. On 29 March 2014 Udara Rathnayake was elected into the Western Provincial Council of Sri Lanka.

== Filmography ==
Year	Film	Roles	Ref.
2005	Sulanga	Kumari's love interest	
2010	Ira Handa Yata	Corporal Rakhitha	
2014	Siri Daladagamanaya	King Kirti Sri Megavanna (King Kithsirimevan)	
2018	Porisadaya	Vishwa Basnayake	
2018	Nela	George	
2021	Kawuruth Danne Na		

=== Selected Television Serials ===
- Wehi Pabalu Sela
