= Damitha Abeyratne =

Sri Lankan actress

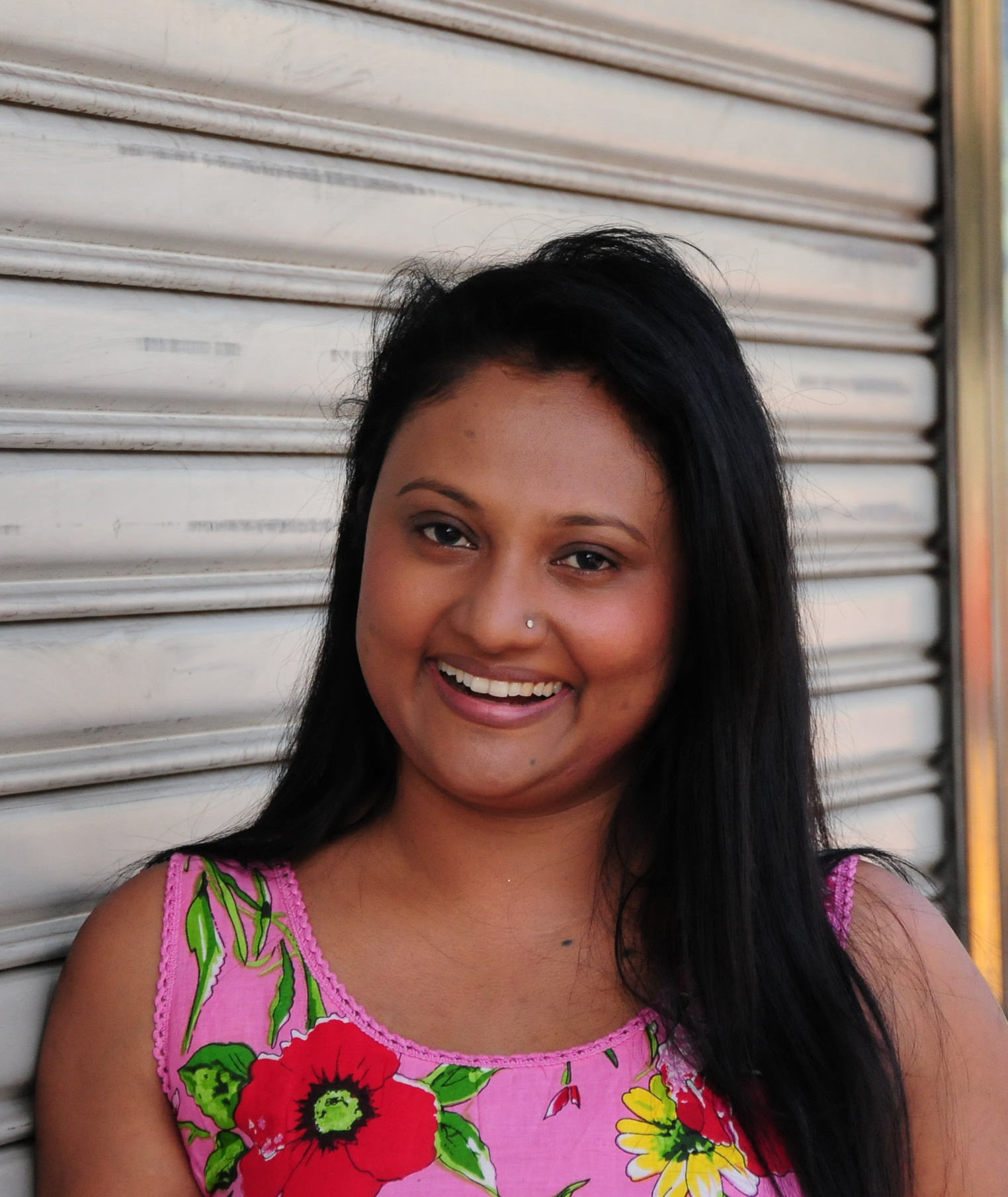
- Born: Sedhavi Mudiyanselage Damitha Buddhini Abeyratne Bandara; 14 September 1975 (age 51); Colombo, Sri Lanka
- Education: Samudradevi Balika Vidyalaya; St. Paul’s Girls School
- Occupation: Actress
- Years active: 1987–Present
- Political party: Samagi Jana Balawegaya (2023 - 2024); Democratic National Alliance (Present)
- Spouse: Lenily Johnson (m. 2014)
- Awards: Sarasaviya Best Actress Award (2003); Sumathi Best Actress Award (2006)
- Website: Damitha Abeyratne's Biography in Sinhala Cinema Database

Sedhavi Mudiyanselage Damitha Buddhini Abeyratne Bandara (Sinhala: දමිතා අබේරත්න; born 14 September 1975), popularly known as Damitha Abeyratne, is a Sri Lankan actress, who appears in Sri Lankan cinema and television.

== Career ==
She schooled at Samudradevi Balika Vidyalaya, Nugegoda and St. Paul’s Girls School, Milagiriya. In 1987, she made her acting debut as an eight-year-old in the teledrama Passe Gena Manamali and later appeared in her first film Meeharaka directed by I. Hewawasam in 1993. However, she only played a significant role with Inoka Sathyangani's 2003 film Sulang Kirilli. This won her the Sarasaviya Best Actress Award, SIGNIS Best Actress Award and many other international awards. She was also won awards for the dramatic roles of Dandubasnamanaya television series and Mee Haraka film. Abeyratne played her debut role as director with the teledrama serial Sasara Sarani, where she was the producer as well. She also played the title role in Batti teledrama, which broadcast on ITN.

== Arrests and Controversies ==
In 2012, an intimate relationship between Abeyratne and Ven. Ruwanwelle Sobhitha thero was revealed after radio station Neth F.M. Balumgala broadcast several vulgar tapes of the alleged monk, trying to recruit a personal secretary.

In 2013, actress Semini Iddamalgoda sued Abeyratne for Rs 50 million having allegedly defamed her during an interview with a Ran F.M. radio channel. In 2014, Abeyratne demanded Rs. 100 million as damages from Iddamalgoda for allegedly defaming her. The case was taken at the Colombo District Court on 24 February 2014. On 14 October 2014, both withdrew their civil suits.

On 5 November 2015, she was asked to make a statement due to a complaint on fraud and corruption at SriLankan Airlines. She went to Presidential Commission of Inquiry to Investigate and Inquire into Serious Acts of Fraud, Corruption and Abuse of Power and State Resources and Privileges (PRECIFAC) and made a statement regarding an irregularity in food supply for a show.

In 2022, Abeyratne was arrested by the Criminal Investigation Department for forcibly entering the presidents secretariat and obstructing the duties of the police officers during 2022 Sri Lankan protests.

In February 2024, musician Iraj Weeraratne unraveled a massaging scandal involving Abeyratne and two months later, Abeyratne and her spouse were arrested by the Criminal Investigation Department facing charges related to a fraud amounting to Rs 3 million, falsely promising employment opportunities in South Korea.

== Filmography ==
Key
†	Denotes films that have not yet been released

Year	Film	Role	Ref.
1994	Mee Haraka	Soma	
1999	Mandakini		
2003	Sulang Kirilli	Rathi	
2007	Nisala Gira	Poddi	
2008	Adara Meena	Also as Playback singer.	
2009	Ekamath Eka Rateka		
2010	Dakina Dakina Mal	Mandakini	
2010	Sthuthi Nawatha Enna		
2010	Bambara Walalla	Kumari	
2010	Ira Handa Yata	LTTE female cadre	
2011	Sinhawalokanaya	Sirimal Ethana	
2011	Gamani	Crouched shooter	
2013	Samanala Sandhawaniya	Punya's roommate	
2014	Rupantharana	Radha	
2015	Maharaja Gemunu	Rohini	
2015	Pravegaya	Brando's wife	
2015	Suhada Koka	Lady in queue	
2016	July 7	Damitha	
2016	Ulath Ekai Pilath Ekai	Roshan's Mother	
2016	Maya 3D	Shantha's fiancée	
2019	Jaya Sri Amathithuma	Mrs. Galigamuwa	
2020	Seda Mawathe	Samanthi	
2022	Hithumathe Jeewithe	Rasika	
2023	Thattu Deke Iskole		
2023	Midunu Vishwaya	Dr. Mahadewa's wife	
2024	Sihinayaki Adare	Varuni Fernando	
2024	Sri Siddha		
2025	Ice Cream		
2025	Bahuchithawadiya	Kanthi	
TBA	Elakandiye Marcus †		
TBA	Suvisi Vivarana †		
TBA	Rosa Kale Api Yan †		
TBA	Room No 106 †		

=== Notable television works ===
- Ambu Daruwo
- Ammai Thaththai
- Anantha
- Apuru Sahodaraya
- Batti
- Bharyawo
- Bhavana - Thunkal Mayawa
- Bhavathra
- Chakrandi
- Dandubasnamanaya
- Depath Nai
- Deveni Athmaya
- Hada Pudasuna
- Hitha Langa Hinahuna
- Ingi Bingi
- Issaraha Gedara
- Jodu Gedara
- Kokila Ginna
- Kiripabalu Vila
- Nedeyo
- Nisala Diya Sasala Viya
- Nisala Vilthera
- Passe Gena Manamali
- Pata Sarungal
- Pork Veediya
- Prakampana
- Rathi Virathi
- Raththarana Neth
- Rejina
- Ridee Tharaka
- Sadisi Tharanaya
- Sahas Gaw Dura
- Salsapuna
- Sanda Dev Diyani
- Sandagira
- Sasara Sarani
- Senehewanthayo
- Sihinaya Wasanthayak
- Sikuru Wasanthe
- Situwarayo
- Sulanga Maha Meraka
- Sulangata Madivee
- Suwanda Obai Amme
- Swayanjatha
- Varana Kambili
- Wala Wettuwa
- Wansakkarayo

== Awards and accolades ==
She has won several awards at the local theater, television and film festivals.

- 2005 - Vishva Keerthi Award For Winning Two International Awards for film Sulang kirilli
- 2005 - Outstanding Young Personality Junior Chamber Sri Lanka for the contribution to the Art

=== SIGNIS OCIC Awards ===
Year	Nominee / work	Award	Result
1995	Dandubasnamanaya	Best Actress	Won
2003	Sulang Kirilli	Best Actress	Won
2010	Dakina Dakina Mal	Best Actress	Won

=== Swarna Sanka Awards ===
Year	Nominee / work	Award	Result
1995	Mee Haraka	Best Supporting Actress	Won

=== Presidential Film Awards ===
Year	Nominee / work	Award	Result
2005	Sulang Kirilli	Best Actress	Won

=== Sarasaviya Awards ===
Year	Nominee / work	Award	Result
1996	Mee Haraka	Merit Award	Won
2004	Sulang Kirilli	Best Actress	Won
2015	Pravegaya	Best Supporting Actress	Won

=== Sumathi Awards ===
Year	Nominee / work	Award	Result
2006	Keli Madala	Best Actress Award	Won

=== Dhaka International Film Festival ===
Year	Nominee / work	Award	Result
2004	Sulang Kirilli	Best Actress Award	Won

=== Tamil Nadu International Film Festival ===
Year	Nominee / work	Award	Result
2004	Sulang Kirilli	Best Actress Award	Won

=== Raigam Tele'es ===
Year	Nominee / work	Award	Result
2012	Swayanjatha	Best Actress	Won
