= Nela (film) =

- promotional poster
- Sinhala: නෙලා
- Directed by: Bennett Rathnayake
- Written by: Bennett Rathnayake
- Based on: Marianela by Benito Pérez Galdós
- Produced by: Benn Films
- Starring: Shalani Tharaka; Udara Rathnayake; Tharuka Wanniarachchi
- Cinematography: Ruwan Costa
- Edited by: Ajith Ramanayake
- Music by: Suresh Maliyadde
- Distributed by: CEL Theatres
- Release date: 14 February 2018
- Country: Sri Lanka
- Language: Sinhala

Nela (Sinhala: නෙලා) is a 2018 Sri Lankan Sinhala romance film directed and produced by Bennett Rathnayake for Benn Films. It stars Shalani Tharaka and Udara Rathnayake in lead roles along with Tharuka Wanniarachchi and Roshan Pilapitiya. Music composed by Suresh Maliyadde.

The story is based on novel Marianela by Benito Pérez Galdós in Indrani Rathnasekara's translation from Spanish. Film screened on 54 cinema theatres of CEL Theatre Board. It is the 1296th Sri Lankan film in the Sinhala cinema.

== Cast ==
- Shalani Tharaka as Nela
- Udara Rathnayake as George
- Tharuka Wanniarachchi as Isabella
- Roshan Pilapitiya as Charles
- Anura Dharmasiriwardena as De Souza, George's father
- Thumindu Dodantenna as Doctor
- Palitha Silva as Rengasamy
- Semini Iddamalgoda
- Udari Perera as Sundari, Nela's mother
- Thimothi O’reilly as Taylor
- Pramuditha Udayakumara as Saping

== Songs ==
No.	Title	Singer(s)	Length
1.	"Man Heenayen Diwa Ga"	Kasun Kalhara
