= Heena Hoyana Samanallu =

- Sinhala: හීන හොයන සමනල්ලු
- Directed by: Rohan Perera
- Written by: Rohan Perera
- Produced by: Sunil T Films
- Starring: Dilhani Ekanayake; Saumya Liyanage; Nethalie Nanayakkara; Vinath Thesath; Anjana Dilsara
- Cinematography: Ruwan Costa
- Edited by: Tissa Surendra
- Music by: Navaratna Gamage
- Distributed by: EAP Theatres
- Release date: 11 August 2017
- Country: Sri Lanka
- Language: Sinhala

Heena Hoyana Samanallu (Sinhala: හීන හොයන සමනල්ලු, lit. 'Dreaming Butterflies') is a 2017 Sri Lankan Sinhala family drama film directed by Rohan Perera and produced by Sunil T Fernando for Sunil T Films. It stars Dilhani Ekanayake and Saumya Liyanage in lead roles along with many child actors. Music composed by Navaratna Gamage. The film was released on 11 August 2017, where the premier show was celebrated at Savoy Premier Cinema Hall, Wellawatte. It is the 1284th Sri Lankan film in the Sinhala cinema.

== Cast ==
- Dilhani Ekanayake as Madhavi Wijebandara
- Saumya Liyanage as Aditya Wijebandara
- Nethalie Nanayakkara as Tharaka's grandmother
- Hemasiri Liyanage as Tharaka's grandfather
- Lucien Bulathsinhala as Specialist doctor
- Jayani Senanayake as Village teacher
- Umali Thilakarathne as Village teacher
- Jayantha Muthuthanthri
- Aruni Mendis as Nurse

=== Child cast ===
- Vinath Thesath as Shehan Wijebandara
- Anjana Dilsara as Tharaka
- Supun Kawishka
- Lakshitha Aravinda
- Yohan Harshana
- Tharupathi Nadun

== Songs ==
No.	Title	Lyrics	Singer(s)	Length
1.	"Sisila Laba"	Kularatne Kariyawansa	Rooney
2.	"Sanda Naewidin Ahasata"	Ajith Krishantha	Uresha Ravihari
