= Sumathi Best Teledrama Single Episode Award =

The Sumathi Best Teledrama Single Episode Award is presented annually in Sri Lanka by the Sumathi Group for the best Sri Lankan single episode in television.

The award was first given in 1995. Following is a list of the winners since then.

Year	Best Episode	Director	Ref.
1995	Ran Thelambuwa	Parakrama Niriella	
1996	Hari Janayo	Ananda Abenayake	
1997	Sellam Geya	Sunil Costa	
1998	Nonagathayaka Nimawa	Inoka Sathyangani	
1999	Gamata Amuththek Awith	Palitha Silva	
2000	Bhoothakshi	Bertram Nihal	
2001	Sil Suwanda	Ananda Abenayake	
2002	Jeewithaya Dutuwemi	Ananda Abenayake	
2003	Magiyaa	Ananda Abenayake	
2004	Vishama Bhaga	Lalith Rathnayake	
2005	Himidiri Kaluwara	Ananda Abenayake	
2006	Punchi Upasikawa	Ananda Abenayake	
2007	Theggen Thegga	Athula Peiris	
2008	Minissu	Ananda Abenayake	
2009	Jeewithayata Amuththek	Ananda Abenayake	
2010	Vidarshana	Chamara Jayaweera	
2011	Wishnu Sankranthiya	Ananda Abenayake	
2012	Manushaya	Santhusa Liyanage	
2013	Tin Patau	Mohanji Ranganath	
2014	Jeewithayaka Kedapathak	Roshan Ravindra	
2015	Nawathum Pola	Santhusa Liyanage	
2016	Pasuthavilla	Ananda Abenayake	
2017	Maathu Padan Peethu Padan Namami	Niwantha Prasara	
2018	Avalokanaya	Lasitha Kariyawasam	
2019	Pavithranige Premaya	Athula Pieris	
2020	Biththara Vee	Sumith Rathnayake	
2021	Senehasaka Nimnaya	Irusha de Silva	
2022	Paramal Suwanda	Chaminda Arambegedara	
2023	Girikulakinuba Mata	Kelum Uduwawala	
