= Semini Iddamalgoda =

Sri Lankan actress (born 1973)

- සේමිණි ඉද්දමල්ගොඩ
- Born: Semini Dinusha Palihawadana; June 19, 1973 (age 53); Colombo
- Education: Niyagama Primary School
- Occupation: Actress
- Years active: 1994–present
- Spouse: Dhammika Keerthi Bandara (m. 1994)
- Children: Kumali Aseka
- Parent(s): K.M.P. Bandara (father); Nesta Palihawadana (mother)

Semini Dinusha Palihawadana née Iddamalgoda (born June 19, 1973, as සේමිණි ඉද්දමල්ගොඩ) [Sinhala]), popularly known as Semini Iddamalgoda, is an actress in Sri Lankan cinema, theater and television. Performing in both dramas to comedies, she is best known for the role Roshini in television sitcom Yes Boss, role Kumari in the film Sinhawa Atharin and as Suddi in film 28.

She participated in reality programs Sirasa Dancing Stars and Hiru Mega Stars

== Personal life ==
Semini Iddamalgoda was born on 19 June 1973 in Colombo as the eldest of the family for K.M.P. Bandara and Nesta Palihawadana. She has a younger brother, Gihan Menaka. She started education from Niyagama Primary School, Elpitiya.

She is married to Dhammika Jayalal Keerthi Iddamalgoda, who is a Police officer. He was born on April 27, 1967, as the youngest of three siblings. His father, Weerasiri Kularatne Iddamalgoda was a Co-operative Inspector and Internal Auditor, and his mother was Fransisca Jayawardane of Weralupa, Ratnapura. Dhammika studied at Sivali Central College, Ratnapura. He joined the Police in 1988 at the age of 21. Just after finishing A/L for Semini, they married on 15 December 1994 and the couple has one daughter, Kumali Aseka born in 2001.

== Acting career ==
In 2001, she is invited to act in the teledrama Irabatu Tharuwa by Sriyani Amarasena. She acted in the stage drama Punchi Adara Balakirima and won the award for the best actress in state drama festival. Hansa Geethaya directed by V. Sivadasan became her first teledrama production.

=== Selected television serials ===
- Abhisamaya
- Amuthu Dosthara
- Amuthu Minissu
- Dedunu Sihina
- Dekona Gini
- Dewana Maw
- Gimhana Tharanaya
- Gini Pupuru
- Irabatu Tharuwa as Punni
- Kadupul Mal
- Kammiththa
- Karuwala Gedara as Podi Hami
- Kinduru Adaviya
- Kiripabalu Vila
- Kuwera Wara
- Maada Nubamaya
- Maya Agni
- Netra Mangalyaya
- Nim Walalla
- Nonimi Yathra
- Pawara Menuwara
- Randoli
- Rangana Vijithaya
- Ran Mehesi
- Samanala Yaya
- Sathya
- Swayanjatha
- Tharupaba
- The Lake
- Ukusso
- Visirunu Renu
- Wara Mal
- Yakada Pahanthira
- Yasa Isuru
- Yes Boss as Roshini

=== Selected stage dramas ===
- Punchi Adara Balakirima

== Beyond acting ==
She was the Second-Runner-Up of the Mrs. Sri Lanka pageant in 1999. In 2006, she hosted the television program Semini Samaga Mathaka Mawatha telecast on TV Derana.

== Controversy ==
In 2013, Iddamalgoda sued fellow actress Damitha Abeyratne for Rs 50 million having allegedly defamed her during an interview with a Ran FM radio channel on January 13, 2013. In 2014, Abeyratne demanded Rs. 100 million as damages from Iddamalgoda for allegedly defaming her. The case was taken at the Colombo District Court on 24 February 2014. On 14 October 2014, both withdrew their civil suits.

== Filmography ==
Her maiden cinematic experience came through a supportive role in 2001 film Rosa Wasanthe, directed by Udayakantha Warnasuriya. Some of her popular films are Sudu Hansi, 28 and Sinahawa Atharin.

Key
†	Denotes films that have not yet been released

Year	Film	Role	Ref.
2001	Rosa Wasanthe	Mihiri	
2003	Yakada Pihatu	Surangi	
2005	Asani Warsha	Kanthi	
2005	Sulanga		
2006	Nilambare	Nimal's wife	
2006	Samaara	Ruwina	
2007	Ran Kevita	Janith's mother	
2009	Ali Surathal	Manju	
2009	Ekamath Eka Rateka		
2010	Sudu Hansi	Shami	
2010	Dakina Dakina Mal	Chamathka	
2010	Suwanda Denuna Jeewithe	Item song	
2011	King Hunther	Neetha	
2014	Ko Mark No Mark	Mrs. Palatupana	
2014	Api Marenne Na	Amarajeewa's wife	
2015	Sinahawa Atharin	Kumari	
2017	28	Suddi	
2017	Paha Samath	Mrs. Meegaspe	
2018	Nela		
2019	Katha Karana Heena		
2022	Ashawari		
2023	Visangamanaya	Rukshani	
2023	Swara		
2024	Seeruwen	adulterous mother	
2024	Mandara	Mamaa	
TBA	Replica †	Ashan's mother	

== Awards and accolades ==
She has won several awards at the local stage drama festivals and television festivals.

=== Sumathi Awards ===
Year	Nominee / work	Award	Result
2001	Irabatu Tharuwa	Best Upcoming Actress	Won
2012	Ithin Mata Awasarai	Merit Award	Won

=== Sarasaviya Awards ===
Year	Nominee / work	Award	Result
2001	Yakada Pihatu	Merit Award	Won

=== State Drama Festival Awards ===
Year	Nominee / work	Award	Result
	Punchi Adara Balakirima	Best Actress	Won

=== Presidential Film Awards ===
Year	Nominee / work	Award	Result
2015	Sinahawa Atharin	Best Actress	Nominated
