= Bennett Rathnayake =

Sri Lankan filmmaker

Bennett Rathnayake බෙනට් රත්නායක
- Born: 24 October 1957 (age 68); Matale, Sri Lanka
- Education: University of Moratuwa
- Occupations: Actor, director, producer, screenwriter
- Years active: 1986–present
- Spouse: Samanmalee Hawapanna
- Children: 3 including Udara Rathnayake

Bennett Rathnayake (Sinhala: බෙනට් රත්නායක; born 24 October 1957), is a filmmaker in Sri Lankan cinema and a television director. He has produced several critically acclaimed award-winning films such as Aswesuma, Sulanga and Ira Handa Yata. He is also the former chairman of the Sri Lanka Film Directors Association.

== Personal life ==
Rathnayake was born on 24 October 1957 in Matale. He worked at the Department of Customs, Sri Lanka for a few years since 1978. Later, he followed a Diploma in Science of Gems at the University of Moratuwa.

He is married to Samanmalee Hawapanna and the couple has one son, Udara and two daughters – Erandathi and Bhagya.

His son Udara Rathnayake is a popular artist and a Member of the Western Provincial Council and was born on 21 June 1986. He completed his education from D. S. Senanayake College and completed his A/L education in politics as well as a postgraduate degree in Political Development. He is also a graduate of Stafford International School, University of Essex. Later he joined the United National Party. He also served as the vice president of the Young Professionals Forum. In 2014, he contested for the Western Province Council Elections in 2014 from the Colombo District from the United National Party. Before entering cinema, he was engaged in business activities related to export sector. Udara is married to Dinali, daughter of Priyantha Kariyapperuma, the former Director General of the Telecommunications Regulatory Commission. The wedding was celebrated on 30 November 2015. The couple has one son, Dishen.

His daughter, Bhagya is also an actress who has acted in several television serials such as Sanda Sakmana, Nimwalalla and films Sulanga and Ira Handa Yata. Bhagya is married to Charith Nagodavithana, son of renowned film producer and conservator Tissa Nagodavithana and his wife Kumari Nagodavithana. Before entering acting, Bhagya worked as a production executive at Coca-Cola Company.

== Career ==
In 1986, Rathnayake followed the cinematography program conducted by the OCIC. At the end of the course, he produced a 25-minute drama called Piyawaru saha Puththu. In 1987, the drama won the award for the best non-serial creation at the O.C.I.C Awards Ceremony. The confidence gained by the award moved him towards National Television and Independence Television channels to produce many television serials in the early 1990s including Tharu which was telecast over MTV. He has produced many notable television serials Tharu, Grahanaya, Kalu Hansayo, Makara Vijithaya, Kadumuna, Palingu, and www.com. In 1988, he directed the serial with 5 episodes, titled Sayuren Eha. In 1994, he established his own institution "Ben Films", as a production institute for teledramas and cinema creation.

In 2001, he became a filmmaker with the maiden film Aswesuma. In that year, he won the Sarasaviya award for Best Director and the film won many awards at several local film festivals including the Platinum Award for the Best First Feature at the 34th Houston International Film Festival. It generally receives positive reviews from critics. The film was critically acclaimed and won the FIPRESCI Prize at the Bombay International Film Festival. In 2001, director Rathnayake won the Platinum award for Best Director at the 34th Houston International Film Festival. In 2001, he won the critics award organised by the Federation of International Cinema Critics Association at the Mumbai International film festival. The film was selected for the Montreal and Quebec City International Film Festivals as well as Moscow IFF, Singapore IFF, and Kerala IFF. In 2001, the film was selected as an entry in the competitive section at the 25th São Paulo International Film Festival in Brazil as well as 4th International film festival in India. In 2002, the film won the Don Quixote, special jury award at the 7th Dhaka Film Festival. On 29 February 2002, the film was screened at San Jose Film Festival and then at Tiburon International Film Festival in USA starting from 22 March 2002. In 2002, director won Golden Reel award for the Best Director at Tiburon International Film Festival held at the Tiburon Playhouse Theatre in USA from 22 to 28 March.

Later in 2005, he directed his second film Sulanga, which acclaimed critical appreciation at the Houston International Cinema Festival. In the mid-2000s, Rathnayake made two television serials – Sudheera and Senda Sakmana. The film has received mostly positive reviews from critics. The film won six awards at the Calcutta International Film festival, Montreal IFF and Rio International Film Festival in Brazil. In 2006, the film won the Silver Remi Award at the Houston International Film Festival. The film was selected to be screened in the competitive section of Pyongyang International Film Festival in September 2006.

In 2010, Rathnayake directed the war-related film Ira Handa Yata. In 2009, it was premiered at the 23rd Singapore International Film Festival and nominated for the Silver Screen Award as well. The film received positive reviews from critics and won the award of ‘Honourable Mention’ at the Los Angeles International Film Festival in 2010. He introduced his son Udara to the Sri Lankan cinema through the film. The film also won the best film award at the first edition of the Identita Film Festival, Italy. In 2013, the film won the Best Film Award at Fiji Film Festival.

After screening Ira Handa Yata in 2010, he tried to make a film called Sath Ima in 2013. The film could not be completed due to several interruptions. So Rathnayake was in a shocking mood for several years. It was at that time when he made the film Nela where the film production was completed in October 2016. He has created the film based on the novel "Nela" translated into Sinhala by Indrani Ratnasekera based on the novel "Marianella" written by Benito Feroz Galdos. However, he waited about a year and a half for the film to be screened on 14 February 2018. The premiere of the film was held at the Regal Cinema Hall in Colombo.

Rathnayake has acted in few films including, Ran Kevita, Ran Kevita 2, Aswesuma, Rajya Sevaya Pinisai and The Wife In 2012, he directed the TV serial Romeo and Dante.

In January 2017, Rathnayake was invited to be part of the jury panel of the 15th International Film Festival of Pune, India (IFFI). In 2019, he directed the television serial Palingu Piyapath.

== Filmography ==
=== As a director ===
Year	Film	Other roles	Ref.
2001	Aswesuma	screenwriter, producer	
2005	Sulanga	screenwriter, producer	
2010	Ira Handa Yata	screenwriter, producer	
2018	Nela	co-producer, dialogue, screenwriter	
2021	Kawuruth Danne Na	producer, screenplay	

=== As an actor ===
Year	Film	Other roles	Ref.
2007	Ran Kevita	Janith's father	
2005	Ran Kevita 2	Janith's father	
2005	Aswesuma		
2005	The Wife		

== Accolades ==
=== Youth Services Council ===
Year	Nominee / work	Award	Result
1975		Best Costume Designer	Won
