= Re Daniel Dawal Migel (film series) =

Sri Lankan comedy media franchise

- Created by: Roy de Silva
- Original work: Re Daniel Dawal Migel (1998)

Films and television
- Film(s): List of films

Audio
- Soundtrack(s): See below

Re Daniel Dawal Migel is a Sri Lankan film series centered on a series of comedy action films, produced by EAP Films and distributed by EAP cinema theaters.

== Overview ==
The franchise consists of three films in the Re Daniel Dawal Migel series, Re Daniel Dawal Migel (1998), Re Daniel Dawal Migel 2 (2000) and Re Daniel Dawal Migel 3 (2004). All three films of the franchise was directed by Roy de Silva with his story, screenplay and dialogues. Cinematography of the first film by G. Nandasena and Lalith M. Gomez and edited by Densil Jayaweera and Pradeep Mahesh. The second film cinematography by G. Nandasena and edited by Densil Jayaweera. Third film cinematography done by G. Nandasena and Lalith M. Gomez and edited by Densil Jayaweera and Pradeep Mahesh.

== History ==
Film	SL release date	Director(s)	Producer(s)	Story by	Composer(s)	Status
Re Daniel Dawal Migel series
Re Daniel Dawal Migel	March 27, 1998	Roy de Silva	Soma Edirisinghe	Roy de Silva	Somapala Rathnayake	Released
Re Daniel Dawal Migel 2	March 31, 2000	Roy de Silva	Soma Edirisinghe	Roy de Silva	Somapala Rathnayake	Released
Re Daniel Dawal Migel 3	May 27, 2004	Roy de Silva	Soma Edirisinghe	Roy de Silva	Somapala Rathnayake	Released

== Timeline ==
Year	Feature films
1998	Re Daniel Dawal Migel
2000	Re Daniel Dawal Migel 2
2004	Re Daniel Dawal Migel 3

== Films ==
=== Re Daniel Dawal Migel (1998) ===
Daniel (Bandu) and Migel (Tennyson) are two kind-hearted but mischievous thieves in the village. They are known for stealing chickens, goats, cattle, and doing other canny things, and they are caught by the village headmaster. After these incidents, they begin to leave the village and move to town.

After moving to town, two detectives, Cobra and his ally (Roy and Lietch), are looking for Daniel and Migel to arrest them. Meanwhile, Daniel and Migel are caught by gangs through a woman, Madhuri (Sangeetha). After a fight, Daniel and Migel become friends with Madhuri. The gang is led by Chandi Ayya (Ranjan), and they have come to find Madhuri. Daniel and Migel rescue Madhuri, and Chandi Ayya also leaves the gang and becomes their friend.

After many incidents, the four of them escape from the two detectives several times and fall in love with women from higher noble families, pretending they are also very rich. Soon the lovers realise the truth and reject them. The final battle with Chandi Ayya's former group takes place, and the four realise their lies. Daniel and Migel are arrested during the end credits.

=== Re Daniel Dawal Migel 2 (2000) ===
At the end of the first film, Daniel (Bandu) and Migel (Tennyson) were jailed for more than 1,700 years. But they enjoyed their life in prison by dancing and singing songs with the other prisoners. The two were released after two years in jail by the President's pardon.

Just after coming out of jail, the two are attacked by the tailor who gave them their suits prior to their arrest. They run away naked after giving back the suits and are met by a newly wedded couple. They move to a hotel and act like two Indian superstars, and soon they are arrested by the police due to causing a nuisance to the public.

At the police station, the two see Chandi Ayya and ask what happened to him and Madhuri after their imprisonment. Chandi Ayya tells the story that he went to commit suicide and was rescued by Lathara's daughter, Wasana (Vasana). Madhuri went to see her mother-in-law with Sanjaya, and not much is known about her.

The three are released by the police, and they start to look for Madhuri. Chandi Ayya welcomes his two friends to Uncle Lathara's house. Lathara (Gemunu) is a musician who always plays the harmonium.

Meanwhile, Madhuri is caught by Richard, who is a drug dealer, and Detective Cobra's ally (Lietch) investigates her case and tells the story to Chandi Ayya and the duo. The three go to see Madhuri, and a fight takes place. Madhuri is rescued and brought back to Sanjaya, and she explains the past. The two reunite again and finally get married.

=== Re Daniel Dawal Migel 3 (2004) ===
Daniel and Migel started looking for a new life, calling themselves 007 and 008. The two began helping people by listening to their problems. They have a new friend, Pin Pon (Rajitha), who is the broker of all these problems.

Silva (Jayantha) and his friend (Damayantha) settled in Lathara's house, and Silva fell in love with Lathara's daughter (Dilhani). But Lathara does not like him and asks him to bring 2 lakhs and become a rich man, and then he will decide whether to allow them to marry.

Meanwhile, Victor (Ananda) is planning the death of his wife, Moreen (Sanoja), to acquire her millions in property and marry a new girl. Victor asks 007 and 008 to kill his wife, promising to pay them for it. The two try many ways to kill her, but none of them succeed.

Silva is also planning to kidnap the rich Moreen and demand money from Victor. However, with the help of Daniel and Migel, Moreen is kidnapped and explains her husband's secret life. Moreen is very disappointed and asks Daniel and Migel to punish him.

Finally, after a series of incidents, Victor is captured through the fake death of Moreen, which was staged as a drama to catch him and recover the money. Victor is jailed, Daniel and Migel get the money, and Lathara accepts Silva as his son-in-law.

== Cast ==
Characters	Films & Actors		
Characters	Re Daniel Dawal Migel (1998)	Re Daniel Dawal Migel 2 (2000)	Re Daniel Dawal Migel 3 (2004)
Daniel	Bandu Samarasinghe	Bandu Samarasinghe	Bandu Samarasinghe
Migel	Tennyson Cooray	Tennyson Cooray	Tennyson Cooray
Chandi Ayya	Ranjan Ramanayake	Ranjan Ramanayake	
Madhuri	Sangeetha Weeraratne	Sangeetha Weeraratne	
Sanjaya	Maduranga Chandimal	Maduranga Chandimal	
C.I.D. Cobra	Roy de Silva	Roy de Silva	
C.I.D. Cobra's helper	Ronnie Leitch	Ronnie Leitch	
Mrs. Kulawansha	Sumana Amarasinghe	Sumana Amarasinghe	
Nirosha	Ruwanthi Mangala		
Wasana		Vasana Danthanarayana	
Richard	Lal Kumara	Lal Kumara	
Lathara		Gemunu Wijesuriya	Gemunu Wijesuriya
Lathara's daughter			Dilhani Ekanayake
Moreen			Sanoja Bibile
Victor			Ananda Wickramage
Pin Pon			Rajitha Hiran
Silva			Jayantha Bopearachchi

== Technical crew ==
Technical aspect	Film & crew		
Technical aspect	Re Daniel Dawal Migel (1998)	Re Daniel Dawal Migel 2 (2000)	Re Daniel Dawal Migel 3 (2004)
Assistant director	Anton Kingsley	Anton Kingsley; Pradeep Mahesh	
Make-up	Rohan Mudannayake	Imal Shanaka Peiris	Rohan Mudannayake
Sound coordination	George Manatunga	Lionel Gunaratne	George Manatunga
Sound Engineer	M. A. A. Alwis		
Stunt direction	Lal Kumara		
Choreography	Wasana Thalpavila		Wasana Halgahagoda
Art direction	Mohan Adams		
Lyrics	Hemasiri Halpita		

== Soundtracks ==
=== Re Daniel Dawal Migel ===
No.	Title	Lyrics	Singer(s)	Length
1.	"Semata Pihitawana"	Hemasiri Halpita	Nuwan Gunawardana, Gratien Ananda, Champa Kalhari
2.	"Sihilal Adara Pawane"	Hemasiri Halpita	Samitha Mudunkotuwa
3.	"Mal Mal Sihinaya"	Hemasiri Halpita	Nuwan Gunawardana, Gratien Ananda, Champa Kalhari
4.	"Hitha Pathanaa Pathum"	Hemasiri Halpita	Nuwan Gunawardana, Champa Kalhari
5.	"Maa Rahasin Amatha"	Hemasiri Halpita	Gratien Ananda, Latha Walpola

=== Re Daniel Dawal Migel 2 ===
No.	Title	Lyrics	Singer(s)	Length
1.	"Api Pisso Raja Pisso"	Hemasiri Halpita	Nuwan Gunawardana, Sangeeth Wickramasinghe
2.	"Atom Bomb"	Hindi Song	Nuwan Gunawardana, Champa Kalhari
3.	"Shri Devi Nam"	Hemasiri Halpita	Nuwan Gunawardana, Champa Kalhari
4.	"Kauday Kauday"	Hemasiri Halpita	Nuwan Gunawardana, Sangeeth Wickramasinghe, Champa Kalhari, Kushani Sandarekha, Bandu Samarasinghe
5.	"Kaudo Kiya Ma Danne Na"	Hemasiri Halpita	Nuwan Gunawardana, Champa Kalhari
6.	"Ira Eliya Watena"	Hemasiri Halpita	Nuwan Gunawardana, Kushani Sandarekha, Nirosha Virajini

=== Re Daniel Dawal Migel 3 ===
No.	Title	Lyrics	Singer(s)	Length
1.	"Ra Daniel Dawal Migel"	Hemasiri Halpita
2.	"Sandawage Lassanai"	Hemasiri Halpita	Nuwan Gunawardana and Uresha Ravihari
3.	"Apita Hulan"	Hemasiri Halpita
4.	"Adare Karamu (baila)"
