= U.W. Sumathipala Awards =

The Sumathi U.W. Sumathipala Memorial Award is presented annually by the Sumathi Group of Companies associated with many commercial brands for the artists who devoted their life to the improvement of Sri Lankan cinema, theatre and television in every aspect. The award named in honour of U. W. Sumathipala, the father of current Sumathi Group owner and the founder of Sumathi Awards, Thilanga Sumathipala.

The award was first given in 1996, and in some years the award has been given to more than one person individual. The following is a list of the winners of this award.

== Award winners ==
Year	Award Winner	Notable work	Ref.
1996	Titus Thotawatte	Director, actor and founder of Sri Lankan dubbing cartoon history.	
1997	Gamini Fonseka	Actor, director, politician and first crowned king of Sinhala cinema.	
1998	Denawaka Hamine	Actress and the grand old lady of Sinhala cinema.	
1998	Hugo Fernando	Actor, lyricist, assistant director and music director.	
1999	K. A. W. Perera	Producer, director and screen play writer.	
1999	Joe Abeywickrama	Actor, author and second crowned king of Sinhala cinema.	
2000	Tony Ranasinghe	Actor, screen play writer and third crowned king of Sinhala cinema.	
2000	Christy Leonard Perera	Actor, musician and renowned comedian.	
2001	Iranganie Serasinghe	Actress, journalist, teacher and granny of Sinhala cinema.	
2001	Malani Fonseka	Actress, director, producer and the Queen of Sinhala cinema.	
2002	Henry Jayasena	Actor, screenplay writer, director and one of the most influential theater actors.	
2002	Ravindra Randeniya	Actor and politician, who awarded more than 6 times as the best actor.	
2003	Sathischandra Edirisinghe	Veteran actor, filmmaker, teledrama director with 50 years service in Sri Lankan art.	
2003	Robin Fernando	Veteran actor, and pioneer of Sri Lankan stunts.	
2004	Wijeratne Warakagoda	Veteran actor, director and icon in Sinhala stage plays.	
2004	Latha Walpola	Veteran singer rated as the Nightingale of Sri Lankan Music industry.	
2006	Shanthi Lekha	Actress who appeared over 350 Sinhala films as the mother.	
2006	Shan Wickremesinghe	Media mogul, broadcaster, broadcast engineer, who is the founder of Sri Lanka's first television station.	
2007	Nanda Malini	Singer, lecturer, music director and one of the most influential singers in Sri Lankan music industry.	
2007	Stanley Perera	Actor, who appeared in more than 40 films in Early phase of Sinhala cinema.	
2008	Roy de Silva	Veteran actor, director, producer, screen play writer, rated as one of the most successful film makers in the Sri Lankan cinema.	
2008	Rex Kodippili	Veteran actor, who appeared in more than 50 films as the villain in Sinhala cinema.	
2009	Clarice de Silva	Actress, who appeared in the Sinhala cinema in the early phase.	
2009	Jeevarani Kurukulasuriya	Actress, who appeared in the Sinhala cinema in the early golden phase.	
2010	Sunil Ariyaratne	Scholar, film director, author, poet, lyricist and one of Sri Lankan most influential senior artists.	
2010	Sriyani Amarasena	Veteran actress, director, producer who appeared many highly rated blockbuster films.	
2011	Anula Karunathilaka	Veteran actress best noted for the role Dammi in blockbuster film Golu Hadawatha.	
2011	Angeline Gunathilake	Veteran singer and composer, who was one of the leading playback singers of Sinhala cinema.	
2012	Cyril Wickramage	Veteran actor, director and singer, known for participating mainly in artistic Sinhala cinema.	
2012	Victor Rathnayake	Veteran singer, violinist, music director, composer, lyricist, who is the first Sri Lankan musician to hold a live one-man concert.	
2013	Punya Heendeniya	Veteran actress, who considered as a legend in Sinhala cinema.	
2013	Sanath Nandasiri	Veteran singer, music director, composer, lyricist, who is one of the leading singers in Sri Lankan music industry.	
2014	Rohana Weerasinghe	Veteran musician, composer and singer, one of Sri Lanka's leading composers in the history.	
2014	Sujatha Attanayake	Music Director, Lecturer, Veteran singer, who is one of the leading singers in Sri Lankan music industry.	
2015	A. D. Ranjith Kumara	Veteran artist, journalist, designer who covered over 300 cover designs.	
2015	Indrani Wijebandara	Veteran singer, who is one of the leading singers in Sri Lankan music industry.	
2016	Amarasiri Kalansuriya	Veteran actor, who is renowned for award winning dramatic roles in Sinhala cinema.	
2016	Anoja Weerasinghe	Veteran actress, producer and a social activist who is one of the most influential actors in Sinhala art.	
2017	Nita Fernando	Veteran actress, and producer who is renowned for award winning dramatic roles in Sinhala cinema.	
2017	Swarna Mallawarachchi	Veteran actress, who is considered as the Golden star of Sinhalese cinema.	
2018	Tissa Wijesurendra	Veteran award winning actor highly popularized during 1970s.	
2018	Geetha Kumarasinghe	Veteran actress and politician, who is the recipient of Sarasaviya Award in four times.	
2019	Alexander Fernando	Veteran actor, one of the action heroes in early Sinhala cinema.	
2019	Sumana Amarasinghe	Veteran actress, considered as the Sweet Girl of Sinhala cinema.	
2020	Douglas Ranasinghe	Veteran actor, one of the popular actor in 1970s Sinhala cinema.	
2020	Manel Wanaguru	Veteran actress, one of the popular actress in 1970s Sinhala cinema.	
2023	Indrani Perera	Veteran songstress, dominated 1980s of Sinhala songs.	
2023	Sanath Gunathilake	Veteran actor, dominated Sinhala cinema in 1980s and 1990s.	
2024	Dharmasiri Bandaranayake	Prominent film director and playwright.	
2024	Priya Suriyasena	Veteran singer, dominated both indoor and outdoor music for four decades.	
