= Sujatha Aththanayaka =

Sri Lankan - Indian singer (born 1942)

Dr. Sujatha Attanayake
- ආචාර්ය සුජාතා අත්තනායක
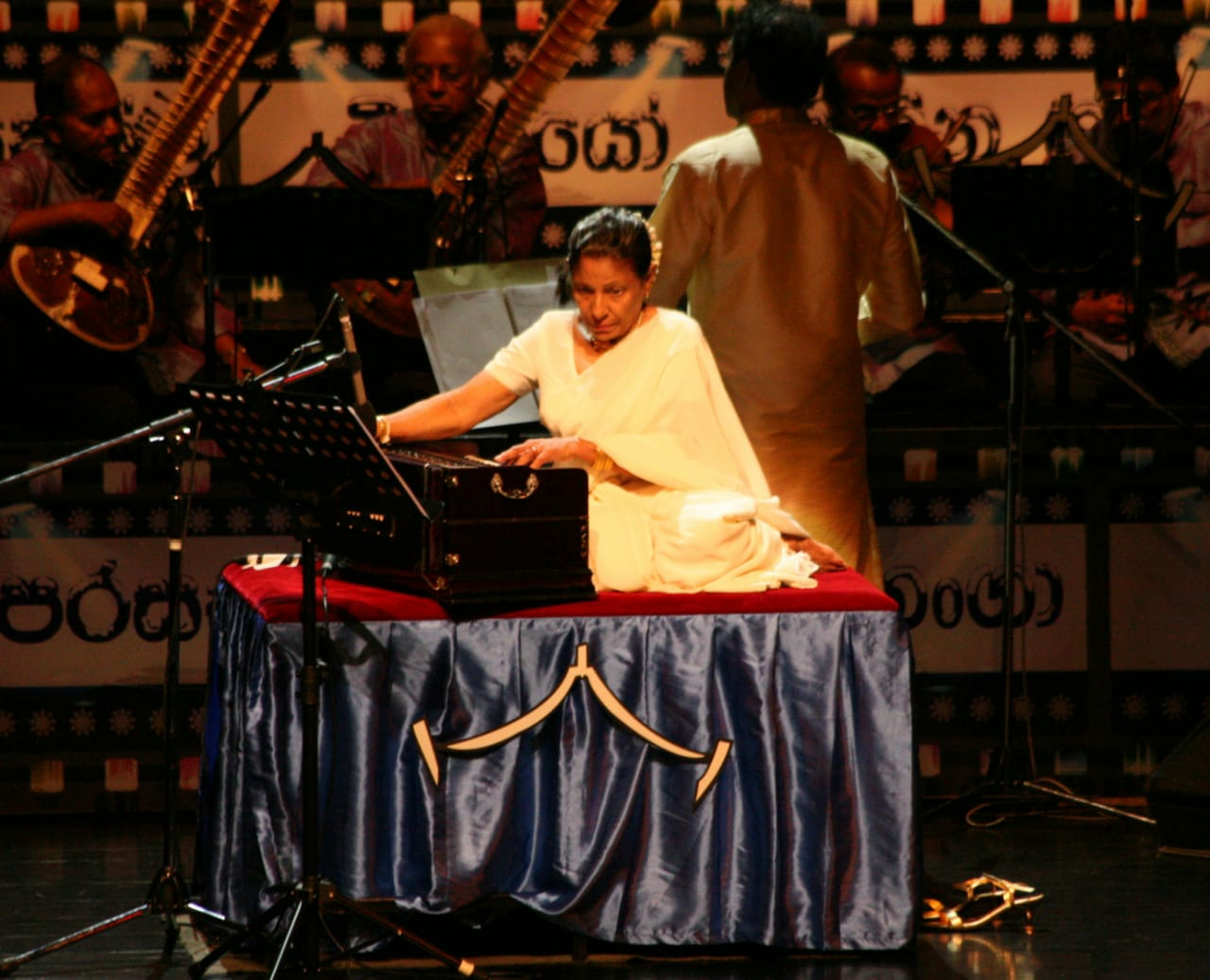
- Born: Mudunkotuwa Munasinghe Arachchige Sujatha Perera; 12 May 1942 (age 84); Kelaniya, Sri Lanka
- Education: Heywood Institute of Art; Bhatkhande Music Institute
- Occupations: Singer, lecturer, Director of Ministry of Education
- Spouse: Navaratne Aththanayaka
- Children: 3
- Parents: Dharmadasa Perera (father); Vimala Kantha (mother)
- Awards: Doctor of Philosophy (Fine Arts) Honoris Causa (University of the Visual & Performing Art-2019)
- Musical career
- Genres: Pop; soul; rhythm and blues; Indian classical music
- Instruments: Vocals, sitar, tabla, violin, guitar, haromonium
- Years active: 1950–present
- Labels: Nilwala; MEntertainment

Mudunkotuwa Munasinghe Arachchige Sujatha Perera (born 12 May 1942: as සුජාතා අත්තනායක), colloquially known as Sujatha Aththanayaka, is a Sri Lankan singer. She is a playback singer in Sinhala cinema and also in Sri Lankan and Indian Tamil cinema. Considered the golden bell of Sinhala music, she holds the record for the most number of cassettes produced by a Sri Lankan woman singer with more than 115 cassettes in a career spanning more than seven decades. She is the first female music director in Sri Lanka. She contributed for nearly 400 Sinhala films and 20 Sri Lankan-Indian Tamil Films as a playback singer. She sang more than 6000 Sinhala songs and more than 1000 songs in 9 different languages.

== Personal life ==
She was born on 12 May 1942 in Kelaniya as the third of five siblings. Her father Mudunkotuwa Munasinghe Arachchige Dharmadasa Perera was a police sergeant. Her mother Gertrude Margaret Wolboff a.k.a. Vimala Kantha was a tower hall actress and singer. She started education in 1947 from Wedamulla Maha Vidyalaya, Kelaniya. She has two sisters and two brothers.

She is married to Navaratne Aththanayaka. She met Navaratne at the State College of Music. The couple has three sons - Hely Sajeewa, Chanaka, Samin. Her second son Captain Chanaka Sanjeewa died on September 25, 1992, in Pooneryn during Eelam War II. Since his death, Aththanayaka quit singing and start to wear white sarees.

After his son's death, she left Sri Lanka for America in 1992. Due to the huge fan demand, she performed a series of successful concerts titled Jeevana Vila Meda in 2012.

== Music career ==
In 1950, she sang Malse Dileva for a feature program in SLBC. After school life at the age of 18, she studied at the State College of Aesthetic and then at State College of Music in 1960. At first she was a lecturer at the Kalutara Teachers Training College and then became a Director of Education (Music) at Ministry of Education, Sri Lanka. In 1967 she went to India to complete a master's degree and "Visharadha" Exams from Lucknow College of Music in singing and playing sitar. After returning, she started to work at Radio Ceylon becoming the only female singer to perform classical music programs on Sri Lanka Radio. He retired as the Director of Aesthetic Education. In 1958 she became the first Sinhalese singer who sang a Hindi song for the program "Bal Sakha".

In 1975, she became the first Sri Lankan female music director and directed music for films such as Hariyata Hari and Sanda Kinduru. Apart from music direction, Aththanayake involved as a playback singer and radio drama singer for many years started with 1956 film Sohoyuro at the age of 14. She sang several popular playback film songs such as Jeewana Vila Meda, Maligawe Ma Rajini, Onchilla Thotili, Guwan Thotille, Herde Rasa Malige, Parawunu Mal Wala and Puthune Me Ahaganna. She recorded four playback songs for four films in one day, which is a record in Sri Lanka. The first song was recorded at Kandana S. P. M. studio. The second song was done in the afternoon at Hendala Vijaya Studios. The third song was recorded at the University of Kelaniya studio and the fourth song was recorded at Lanka Studios. She sang playback songs for nearly 400 Sinhala Films. In 1979, a special music test conducted by the Sri Lanka Broadcasting Corporation won the first place in the rankings, beating all other singers.

She is the only singer to perform in India where she sang in different languages such as Hindi, Tamil, Urdu, Telugu, Malayalam, Marathi, English and Nepali. In 1980, she had the opportunity to sing the song Subha Kamina at the President's House when Nepal King Birendra and Queen Vimla arrived Sri Lanka. She was the first Sinhala singer to perform a Nepali song in the Asian Hindi Service. She also performed a Tamil one-man concert Swaram in Bambalapitiya as well as an Islam concert Ilampirai Geethangal in Maradana. She sang Tamil songs for 20 Tamil Films. She sang playback songs for Indian actresses like Radhika Sarathkumar, Thanuja Mukherjee and Vaijayanthimala.

Her husband was the musician in some of her popular songs including Aganthuka Kurulla, Bolan Podi Nangi Tikak Hitapan, Jeewathwana Thuru Ma, Neth Wasa and Wessata Themi Themi. Apart from singing, she is a talented Katak dancer who studied under Sirimathi Rasadari. In 1985, she represented Sri Lankan cultural delegation at the SAARC Summit. In 1992, after the death of her son, she launched a cassette "Yuda Bima Kandulak" to commemorate her son's first death anniversary.

She sang more than 6000 Sinhala songs and 1000 Tamil songs. She was also involved with many popular duets including; Obe Namin, Banda Jaya Keheli with Amaradeva Sandun Sihil, Adara Pujasane with Victor Rathnayake, Koho Koho Kohe Idan with Sanath Nandasiri, Bonda Meedum Kandurelle with Abeywardena Balasuriya, Chandrame Ra Paya Awa, Ghana Andakarayen Midi with H.R. Jothipala, Piruna Hada Santhane, Gangawe Neela Jale with Harun Lanthra, Madhura Yame with R. Muttusamy, Pera Athmayaka with Milton Perera and Pushpa Makarandaya with Narada Disasekara.

In 2016, she directed the music for the Sri Lanka Police theme song and later she composed the theme song of the Sri Lanka Special Task Force (STF).

== Concerts ==
In 1974 she started her first solo concert "Asi Mihira"

- Asi Mihira - First Solo Concert - From 1974
- Swaram - Solo Tamil Songs Concert
- Ilampirei Geethangal - Solo Islam Songs Concert
- Gee Pooja - This concert was performed for the people displaced by the war and for the soldiers during the war period.
- Sujatha Gee - This Concert was performed in foreign countries like America, France, New Zealand etc.
- Sujatha Swara Sangeet - India Nagpur
- Jeevana Vila Meda (2012 - 2013)

== Awards and accolades ==
In 1965, she was awarded the Swarna Sanka Award for Best Singer of the Year for the song Duka Eka Eka Peralila in the film Yata Giya Dawasa. In 1966, she won the award for the song Paravunu Mal Wala in the film Parasathumal at Sarasaviya Film Festival. She was awarded with "Pan Mai Kokilam" by Sri Lanka Muslim Artiste Front. In 2021, she was honored with a lifetime achievement award during the ceremony held for 21 artists who made an invaluable contribution to Sinhala cinema in the early decades of Sinhala Cinema.

=== Sarasaviya Awards ===
Year	Nominee / work	Award	Result
1966	Parawunu Mal Wala (Parasthu Mal)	Best Female Singer	Won
1974	Puthune Me Ahaganna (Kalyani Ganga)	Best Female Singer	Won
1974	Puthune Me Ahaganna (Kalyani Ganga)	Most Popular Singer	Won
2016	Contribution to Cinema	Ranathisara Award	Won

=== Swarna Sankha Award ===
Year	Nominee / work	Award	Result
1965	Duka Ena Kala (Yatagiya Dawasa)	Best Female Singer	Won
1966	Parawunu Mal Wala (Parasathu Mal)	Best Female Singer	Won

=== Defence Awards ===
Year	Nominee / work	Award	Result
1994	Sri Lanka Navy	Sudheera Matha Award	Won
1994	Sri Lanka Army	Abhimana Award	Won
2012	Sri Lanka Navy	Honorary Award	Won
2013	Sri Lanka Army	Gawrawa Prasada Sannasa	Won
2014		Suwanda Padma Honorary Award	Won
2014		Widulipura Honorary Award	Won
2015	Sri Lanka Police	Honorary Award	Won
2019	Sri Lanka Army	Weera Matha Award	Won
1965		Best	Won
1965		Best	Won

=== Miscellaneous Awards ===
Year	Nominee / work	Award	Result
1972	Best Female Singer	Kumarathungu Memorial Award	Won
1972	Most Popular Singer	Deepashika Award	Won
1974	Best Female Singer	Presidential Award	Won
2012		Kalyani Prasadini Award	Won
2013		Tower Hall Foundation Honorary Award	Won
2014	Sumathi Awards	U.W. Sumathipala Memorial Award	Won
2014	Dr.Lional Edirisinghe Memorial Award	University of the Visual and Performing Arts	Won
2015		People's Honorary Award	Won
2016		Youth Honorary Award	Won
2012		Maliban Honorary Award	Won
2014		Bank of Ceylon Honorary Award	Won
2016	State Music Awards	Sunil Shantha Memorial Award	Won
2017		Sujatha Attanayake Abhinandana Award	Won

2009 - Vidhyalankara Honorary Award

2011 - Dheemathi Award

2015- Susara Pranama Award

2017 - ADTF Honorary Award

2017 - Prathibha Pranama Award

2017 - OSCAR Pooja Pranama Award

2018 - Kalabhushana Award

2019 - Honorary Award - Hansa Kalaashram

2019 - Honorary Doctorate - University of the Visual and Performing Arts

2020 - Kalabhimani Award

2020 - Jeevana Prashansa Honorary Award

In 2017, Amila Lokumannage wrote her biopic Sujatha Deshaye Madurathama Swaraya.

Attanayake's Book Launch ceremony entitled "Sujatha Attanayake Abhinandana" was held on 11 November 2017, at the Sri Lanka Foundation Institute where she launched her biography, "Sujatha Deshaye Madhurathama Swaraya" and a Catalogue of her songs titled "Sujatha Attanayake Geethawaliya", written by Amila Lokumannage.

In 2019, Aththanayake was honored as a heroic mother who was gifted a heroic son who sacrificed his life for the country. In the same year, she was awarded honorary doctorate from University of the Visual and Performing Arts.

== Filmography ==
=== Playback singing ===
Year	Film	Notes
1958	Sohoyuro	
1958	Shobha	
1958	Daskama	
1960	Vana Mala	
1961	Daruwa Kageda?	
1961	Vaedi Bima	
1962	Sansare	
1962	Suhada Divi Piduma	
1963	Sudu Sande Kalu Wala	
1963	Sikuru Tharuwa	
1964	Kala Kala De Pala Pala De	
1964	Dheewarayo	
1964	Sulalitha Sobhani	
1964	Suba Sarana Sepa Sithe	
1964	Samiya Birindage Deviyaya	
1964	Sithaka Mahima	
1964	Sujage Rahasa	
1965	Sudo Sudu	
1965	Yata Giya Dawasa	
1965	Hithata Hitha	
1965	Allapu Gedara	
1965	Satha Panaha	
1965	Sweep Ticket	
1965	Sekaya	
1965	Landaka Mahima	
1966	Segawena Sewanella	
1966	Maha Ra Hamuwu Sthriya	
1966	Mahadena Muththa	
1966	Athulweema Thahanam	
1966	Sihina Hathak	
1966	Kinkini Paada	
1966	Kapatikama	
1966	Seegiri Kashyapa	
1966	Parasathu Mal	
1966	Sudu Duwa	
1966	Sanda Nega Eddi	
1966	Layata Laya	
1967	Hathara Kendare	
1967	Manamalayo	
1967	Daru Duka	
1967	Segawunu Menika	
1967	Amathaka Unada	
1967	Pipena Kumudu	
1967	Magul Poruwa	
1967	Sarana	
1967	Saru Bima	
1967	Ran Rasa	
1967	Ipadune Ai?	
1967	Iwasana Dana	
1967	Sura Chauraya	
1968	Pini Bindu	
1968	Singithi Surathal	
1968	Punchi Baba	
1968	London Hamu	
1968	Amathikama	
1968	Hangi Hora	
1968	Indunila	
1968	Ruhunu Kumari	
1968	Dehadaka Duka	
1968	Adarawanthayo	
1968	Ataweni Pudumaya	
1969	Oba Nathinam	
1969	Kohomada Wede	
1969	Narilatha	
1969	Hari Maga	
1969	Hathara Peraliya	
1969	Baduth Ekka Horu	
1969	Surayangeth Suraya	
1969	Binaramali	
1969	Uthum Sthriya	
1969	Pancha	
1970	Lakseta Kodiya	
1970	Dan Mathakada	
1970	Athma Pooja	
1970	Geetha	
1970	Suli Sulang	
1971	Kesara Sinhayo	
1972	Sujeewa	
1972	Singapore Charlie	
1972	Hithaka Pipunu Mal	
1972	Hathara Wate	
1972	Veeduru Gewal	
1972	Me Desa Kumatada	
1973	Matara Achchi	
1973	Thushara	
1973	Gopalu Handa	
1973	Hathdinnath Tharu	
1973	Sunethra	
1974	Surekha	
1974	Hadawath Naththo	
1974	Kalyani Ganga	
1974	Susee	
1974	Senakeliya	
1975	Hitha Honda Minihek	
1975	Aese Idiripita	
1975	Obai Mamai	
1975	Kaliyuga Kale	
1975	Raththaran Amma	
1975	Sukiri Kella	
1975	Kohoma Kiyannada	
1975	Cyril Malli	
1975	Lassana Kella	
1976	Pradeepe Ma Wewa	
1976	Ganga	
1976	Harima Badu Thunak	
1976	Duhulu Malak	
1976	Loka Horu	
1976	Haratha Hathara	
1976	Asha	
1976	Hariyata Hari	
1976	Mangala	
1977	Neela	
1977	Sakunthala	
1977	Sudu Paraviyo	
1977	Deviyani Oba Kohida	
1977	Yali Ipade	
1977	Aege Adara Kathawa	
1977	Tom Pachaya	
1977	Niwena Ginna	
1977	Yakadaya	
1978	Chandi Shyama	
1978	Mage Ran Putha	
1978	Deepanjali	
1978	Apeksha	
1978	Kumara Kumariyo	
1979	Minisun Athara Minisek	
1979	Palagetiyo	
1979	Anusha	
1979	Subhani	
1980	Kanchana	
1980	Silva	
1980	Anuhasa	
1980	Sasaraka Pathum	
1980	Mage Amma	
1980	Hondin Inna	
1980	Miyurige Kathawa	
1981	Sayuru Thera	
1981	Ajasaththa	
1981	Ek Dawasak Ra	
1981	Senasuma	
1981	Sudda	
1982	Mihidum Sihina	
1982	Sandaa	
1982	Re Manamali	
1982	Pradeepa	
1982	Situ Diyaniyo	
1982	Miss Mallika	
1982	Kadawunu Poronduwa remake	
1983	Chandira	
1984	Kokila	
1984	Namal Renu	
1984	Hadawathaka Wedana	
1985	Aeya Waradida Oba Kiyanna	
1985	Adarayaka Mahima	
1986	Mal Warusa	
1986	Dew Duwa	
1989	Okkoma Rajawaru	
1989	Shakthiya Obai Amme	
1990	Veera Udara	
1992	Malsara Dhoni	
1993	Jeevan Malli	
1993	Come or Go Chikago	
1994	Nohadan Landune	
1994	Soorayangeth Sooraya	
1998	Aeya Obata Barai	
2001	Daru Upatha	
2003	Cheriyo Holman	
2016	Jeewithe Lassanai	

== Playback film tracks ==
Year	Film	Song	Duet	Ref.
1970	Geetha	Pena Pena Ena		
1970	Geetha	Masitha Vil Thera Chanchala We	with H. R. Jothipala	
1970	Suli Sulang	Kohedo Kohedo Aetha	with H. R. Jothipala	
1971	Kesara Sinhayo	Heeneki Jeewithe		
1972	Sujeewa	Atha Wana Petha Sarasala		
1972	Singapore Charlie	Wasanthaye Jeewana Liya Gomuwe	with Tony Hassan	
1972	Singapore Charlie	Aradhana Se Hamuwanna	with Nihal Jayawardena	
1972	Hithaka Pipunu Mal	Chanchala Nu Pura Kinkini		
1972	Hithaka Pipunu Mal	Tamil song		
1972	Hathara Wate	Sakwala Gala Mepita Upan	with Sanath Nandasiri, Narada Disasekara, K. Sena	
1972	Veeduru Gewal	Geewith Yauwana Yame	with Harun Lanthra	
1972	Veeduru Gewal	Ma Thani Vee		
1972	Me Desa Kumatada	Ghana Andhakarayen Midi	with H. R. Jothipala	
1973	Matara Achchi	Sandun Sihina Sihil Arana		
1973	Thushara	Ran Tharu Se	with Harun Lanthra	
1973	Thushara	Kawudo Me Awe	with H. R. Jothipala, Angeline Gunathilake	
1973	Gopalu Handa	Gantheere Gangawe	with Harun Lanthra	
1973	Gopalu Handa	Tharuna Sithaka Arume		
1973	Gopalu Handa	Kaansiye Mahansiye	with R. Muttusamy	
1973	Gopalu Handa	Mandire Pem Sendelle	with Harun Lanthra	
1974	Surekha	Oba Mage Nam Mama Obe Nam	with H. R. Jothipala	
1974	Hadawath Naththo	Udagirin Paaya Dinapathida		
1974	Kalyani Ganga	Puthune Me Ahaganna Puthune		
1974	Susee	Dan Dan Awile Gini		
1974	Susee	Pudumai Hari Pudumai		
1974	Senakeliya	Sithuvili Yahanaka Sethapena	with Milton Mallawarachchi	
1974	Senakeliya	Bol Pini Meda		
1975	Hitha Honda Minihek	Ma Gee Gayana Mohothakado		
1975	Hitha Honda Minihek	Mage Ahinsaka Podi Duwe	with H. R. Jothipala	
1975	Aese Idiripita	Laye Miyagiya Mage Sihine		
1975	Obai Mamai	Madara Mal Kumari	with H. R. Jothipala	
1975	Obai Mamai	Anuraga Otunu Peladi	with H. R. Jothipala	
1975	Obai Mamai	Kuludul Wanamal Malwara	with H. R. Jothipala	
1975	Kaliyuga Kale	Hemin Hemin Depa Thiya		
1975	Raththaran Amma	Hada Sal Gase Ethena	with H. R. Jothipala	
1975	Sukiri Kella	Seedevi Gimhana Kale	with H. R. Jothipala	
1975	Sukiri Kella	Seedevi Geta Awe		
1975	Sukiri Kella	Tharupathi Wata Tharu Keta		
1975	Kohoma Kiyannada	Nawa Sanda Pun Sanda Wei	with Milton Perera	
1975	Kohoma Kiyannada	Mediyam Ra Diyaweddi		
1975	Kohoma Kiyannada	Neth Basin Kee Hangum		
1975	Cyril Malli	Pegena Apa Hata Athwel		
1976	Harima Badu Thunak	Muwe Mee Nura Ken		
1976	Duhulu Malak	Bonda Meedum Kandurelle		
1976	Loka Horu	Randola Gebaki	with Milton Perera	
1976	Haratha Hathara	Atha Bhawaye Rama Seetha	with Victor Rathnayake	
1976	Haratha Hathara	Johana Kenadi	with Freddy Silva	
1976	Asha	Athura Supem Kekulu	with Victor Rathnayake	
1976	Hariyata Hari	Methek Helu Duk Kanduleli		
1976	Mangala	Selena Hadawathe		
1976	Mangala	Kuludul Adare Rahasa Denuna	with Milton Mallawarachchi	
1977	Neela	Sondure Hadamal Hee Wedila	with H. R. Jothipala	
1977	Neela	Aradhana Sansaraye		
1977	Sakunthala	Athmayen Athmayata	with H. R. Jothipala	
1977	Sakunthala	Herde Rasa Malige		
1977	Sakunthala	Adara Lowe Asiri	with H. R. Jothipala	
1977	Sakunthala	Seethala Rate Meeduma Wete		
1977	Sakunthala	Seethala Pawe Mal Samaye	with Victor Rathnayake	
1977	Sudu Paraviyo	Visithuru Sihina Lowe	with H. R. Jothipala	
1977	Deviyani Oba Kohida	Adara Poojasane	with Victor Rathnayake	
1977	Yali Ipade	Sansare Vindi Sahane	with Milton Perera	
1977	Yali Ipade	Puruwe Athmayaka Bedi		
1977	Aege Adara Kathawa	Oba Mage Neth Deka Wage	with H. R. Jothipala, Siri Perera	
1977	Aege Adara Kathawa	Oba Mage Neth Deka Wage		
1977	Tom Pachaya	Hade Prema Asha	with H. R. Jothipala	
1977	Tom Pachaya	Nona Kageda Kage	with Milton Perera, Angeline Gunathilake, Freddy Silva	
1977	Niwena Ginna	Chanchala Desaka Wasana	with Victor Rathnayake	
1977	Niwena Ginna	Hadak Soyan Yamin Gaman	with Victor Rathnayake	
1977	Yakadaya	Sithu De Pathu De Ituwi Yay	with H. R. Jothipala	
1977	Yakadaya	Asha Reli Dese Weli	with H. R. Jothipala	
1978	Chandi Shyama	Karumeki Upanne Lowe		
1978	Chandi Shyama	Ho Enu Mena Lanvila	with H. R. Jothipala	
1978	Mage Ran Putha	Sanda Paaya	with Sisira Senaratne	
1978	Deepanjali	Sanda Paane Madahase	with H. R. Jothipala	
1978	Apeksha	Sonduru Lowata Mal Wehela	with H. R. Jothipala	
1978	Kumara Kumariyo	Neela Desa Thavuthisawe	with Milton Mallawarachchi	
1978	Kumara Kumariyo	Supem Sendelle	with H. R. Jothipala, Milton Mallawarachchi, Angeline Gunathilake	
1979	Minisun Athara Minisek	Ma Pethum Pirena Vilase	with H. R. Jothipala	
1979	Minisun Athara Minisek	Mage Mathake Obe Ruwa Aede	with H. R. Jothipala	
1979	Palagetiyo	Mal Pipunata Lowa	with Victor Rathnayake	
1979	Anusha	Saman Sugande Wimasanna	with H. R. Jothipala, Indrani Perera	
1979	Anusha	Kumareki Inne Kumariye	with Roy de Silva	
1979	Subhani	Neela Nayana Sele	with H. R. Jothipala	
1980	Kanchana	Jeewana Hada Ambare	with Milton Mallawarachchi	
1980	Silva	Piyum Vile Pini Kandule	with H. R. Jothipala	
1980	Sasaraka Pathum	Sasara Thurulle	with H. R. Jothipala	
1980	Mage Amma	Natala Gayala Weda Keruwa	with Harun Lanthra	
1980	Hondin Inna	Balaporoththuwe Sihina Malu		
1980	Hondin Inna	Diwa Re Deke	with Harun Lanthra	
1980	Miyurige Kathawa	Sudo Mama Adarei		
1981	Ajasaththa	Magadha Desha Bimbisara		
1981	Ek Dawasak Ra	Edath Mage Adath Mage		
1981	Senasuma	Adaraye Mal Pipila	with H. R. Jothipala	
1981	Senasuma	Podi Puthu Randa		
1982	Sandaa	Vile Mukulu Vila Mathupita		
1982	Re Manamali	Muthulelle Me Ahunado		
1982	Pradeepa	Malsara Hee Dahare	with Asoka Ponnamperuma	
1982	Pradeepa	Ambiliya Gena		
1982	Situ Diyaniyo	Paabedi Noopura Minigigiri		
1982	Mihidum Sihina	Seetha Hima Relle	with H. R. Jothipala	
1982	Miss Mallika	Ai Oba Mata Metharam	with H. R. Jothipala	
1982	Kadawunu Poronduwa	Is Issara Wela	with Eddie Jayamanne	
1983	Chandira	Man Romeo	with Gratien Ananda, Gunadasa Kapuge, Indra Liyanage	
1984	Kokila	Aloke Jeewithe		
1984	Kokila	Mage Jeewithe Mage Adare	with H. R. Jothipala, Harun Lanthra	
1984	Kokila	Aho Kimado Mese Une		
1984	Namal Renu	Kuludul Noyidul Senehasa	with H. R. Jothipala	
1985	Adarayaka Mahima	Pipunu Mala Wage Suwadai	with H. R. Jothipala	
1985	Adarayaka Mahima	Gimhana Yamaye		
1985	Adarayaka Mahima	Hadaka Mahima Dehadak Ekvila	with H. R. Jothipala	
1986	Mal Warusa	Mal Wesse Themi Themi	with H. R. Jothipala	
1989	Okkoma Rajawaru	Madhura Prema Nimnaye	with Gratien Ananda	
1989	Shakthiya Obai Amme	Akasa Nadee There	with Tony Hassan	
1989	Shakthiya Obai Amme	Podi Puthu Ipadunu Dine	with Tony Hassan, Uresha Ravihari	
1990	Veera Udara	Wasanawa Pedi		
1990	Veera Udara	Nisha Yame Hima Wala Theere	with Gratien Ananda	
1990	Veera Udara	Kurullaneni Kirilli Kohe	with Gratien Ananda, Maya Damayanthi, Victor Vijayantha	
