= Re Daniel Dawal Migel =

- DVD Poster
- Directed by: Roy de Silva
- Written by: Roy de Silva
- Produced by: E.A.P Films
- Starring: Bandu Samarasinghe; Tennyson Cooray; Ranjan Ramanayake; Sangeetha Weeraratne
- Cinematography: G. Nandasena; Lalith M. Gomez
- Edited by: Densil Jayaweera; Pradeep Mahesh
- Music by: Somapala Rathnayake
- Distributed by: E.A.P Films
- Release date: 23 March 1998 (Colombo)
- Country: Sri Lanka
- Language: Sinhala

Re Daniel Dawal Migel (Sinhala: රෑ දනියෙල් දවල් මිගෙල්) is a 1998 Sri Lankan Sinhala comedy, action film directed by Roy de Silva and produced by Soma Edirisinghe for E.A.P Films. It is the first film of Re Daniel Dawal Migel film franchise. It stars comic duo Bandu Samarasinghe, and Tennyson Cooray in lead roles along with Ranjan Ramanayake, Sangeetha Weeraratne and Maduranga Chandimal. Music for the film is done by Somapala Rathnayake. The film became one of Sri Lanka's blockbuster movies with reaching more than 150 days in cinema theatres. It is the 894th Sri Lankan film in the Sinhala cinema.

== Plot ==
Daniel (Bandu) and Migel (Tennyson) are two kind-hearted but mischievous thieves in the village. They are known for stealing chickens, goats, cattle, and doing other canny things, and they are caught by the village headmaster. After these incidents, they begin to leave the village and move to town.

After moving to town, two detectives, Cobra and his ally (Roy and Lietch), are looking for Daniel and Migel to arrest them. Meanwhile, Daniel and Migel are caught by gangs through a woman, Madhuri (Sangeetha). After a fight, Daniel and Migel become friends with Madhuri. The gang is led by Chandi Ayya (Ranjan), and they have come to find Madhuri. Daniel and Migel rescue Madhuri, and Chandi Ayya also leaves the gang and becomes their friend.

After many incidents, the four of them escape from the two detectives several times and fall in love with women from higher noble families, pretending they are also very rich. Soon the lovers realise the truth and reject them. The final battle with Chandi Ayya's former group takes place, and the four realise their lies. Daniel and Migel are arrested during the end credits.

== Cast ==
- Bandu Samarasinghe as Ra Daniyel
- Tennyson Cooray as Dawal Migel
- Ranjan Ramanayake as Chandi Ayya
- Sangeetha Weeraratne as Madhuri
- Maduranga Chandimal as Sanjaya
- Roy de Silva as C.I.D Cobra
- Sumana Amarasinghe as Sanjaya's mother
- Ronnie Leitch as Cobra helper
- Ruwanthi Mangala as Nirosha
- Feliz Premawardena

== Soundtrack ==
No.	Title	Lyrics	Singer(s)	Length
1.	"Semata Pihitawana"	Hemasiri Halpita	Nuwan Gunawardana, Gratien Ananda, Champa Kalhari
2.	"Sihilal Adara Pawane"	Hemasiri Halpita	Samith Mudunkotuwa
3.	"Mal Mal Sihinaya"	Hemasiri Halpita	Nuwan Gunawardana, Gratien Ananda, Champa Kalhari
4.	"Hitha Pathanaa Pathum"	Hemasiri Halpita	Nuwan Gunawardana, Champa Kalhari
5.	"Maa Rahasin Amatha"	Hemasiri Halpita	Gratien Ananda, Latha Walpola

== Sequel ==
Two more films of the franchise have been released. The second installment Re Daniel Dawal Migel 2 was released on 2000 and third and final installment Re Daniel Dawal Migel 3 was released on 2004.
