= Cheriyo Doctor =

Cheriyo Doctor චෙරියෝ ඩොක්ටර්
- Directed by: Roy de Silva
- Written by: Roy de Silva
- Produced by: TK Films
- Starring: Joe Abeywickrama; Sanath Gunathilake; Sabeetha Perera; Bandu Samarasinghe
- Cinematography: S. A. Gafoor
- Edited by: S. V. Chandran
- Music by: Somapala Rathnayake
- Production company: Hong Kong Color Movie Lab
- Release date: 11 October 1991
- Country: Sri Lanka
- Language: Sinhala

Cheriyo Doctor (Sinhala: චෙරියෝ ඩොක්ටර්) is a 1991 Sri Lankan Sinhala romantic comedy film directed by Roy de Silva and produced by Thilak Atapattu for TK Films. It is the first film of Cheriyo film series, which continued with three more films in 1995 (Cheriyo Captain), 1996 (Cheriyo Darling) and 2002 (Cheriyo Holman). It stars Joe Abeywickrama, Sanath Gunathilake and Sabeetha Perera in lead roles along with Bandu Samarasinghe, Tennison Cooray and Freddie Silva. Music for the film is done by Somapala Rathnayake. It is the 734th Sri Lankan film in the Sinhala cinema.

== Plot ==
Cheriyo Doctor, centering on the incidents occur within a mental hospital run by Professor. Incidents starts when Nurse Surangi falls in love with one of fake patient Chaminda Randenigala. After series of comedy incidents, Chaminda's friend Nalin also attended to the hospital with fake illness and Chaminda's realized that his sister Madhu falls in love with Nalin. However, Chaminda's mother Nayana Randenigala opposes their romantic behaviors and locked Madhu. With the help of hospital staff, Chaminda and Nalin fight against Nayana's thugs and win their fiancees.

== Cast ==
- Joe Abeywickrama as Professor
- Sanath Gunathilake as Chaminda Randenigala
- Sabeetha Perera as Surangi
- Bandu Samarasinghe as Marmite
- Tennison Cooray as Hospital attendant
- Freddie Silva as Doctor Coco and Virindu singer
- Nihal Silva as Doctor Ko
- Shashi Wijendra as Nalin
- Nadeeka Gunasekara as Madhu
- Sumana Amarasinghe as Nayana Randenigala
- Cletus Mendis as Cleet
- Mark Samson as Mark
- Lilian Edirisinghe as Head nurse
- Teddy Vidyalankara as Chance's henchman
- Hugo Fernando as Patient
- Mabel Blythe as Mrs. Saparamadu
- Manel Chandralatha as Nurse
- Samanthi Lanarole as Nurse
- Nawanandana Wijesinghe as Patient
- Gothami Pathiraja as Dracula nurse
- M. V. Balan as Security guard
- Lionel Deraniyagala as Chance
- Jayalath Fernando as 'Thaddiya' guard
- Lakmal Fonseka as Crossdresser
- Vishaka Siriwardana as Nurse
- Sunil Bamunuarachchi
- Jinadasa Perera

== Songs ==
The film consists with six songs.

No.	Title	Singer(s)	Length
1.	"Gee Nada Pawethe"	Gratien Ananda, Latha Walpola
2.	"Sihina Lathaviya"	Ananda Perera, Maya Damayanthi
3.	"Latin American song"	Sunil de Silva
4.	"Sakala Sarin Piri"	Freddie Silva
5.	"Vikara Loke"	Freddie Silva
6.	"Bar Bar Eken Bila"	Freddie Silva
