= Cheriyo =

Sri Lankan comedy media franchise

- Created by: Roy de Silva
- Original work: Cheriyo Doctor (1991)

Films and television
- Film(s): List of films

Audio
- Soundtrack(s): See below

Cheriyo is a Sri Lankan film series centered on a series of comedy action films, produced by TK Films and RS Films and distributed by EAP cinema theaters.

== Overview ==
The franchise consists of four films in the Cheriyo series, Cheriyo Doctor (1991), Cheriyo Captain (1995), Cheriyo Darling (1996) and Cheriyo Holman (2002). The first three films of the franchise was directed by Roy de Silva with his screenplay and dialogues. The film Cheriyo Doctor was produced by Thilak Atapattu for TK Films, cinematography by S. A. Gafoor and edited by S. V. Chandran. The second film Cheriyo Captain was produced again by Thilak Atapattu, cinematography by G. Nandasena and edited by Densil Jayaweera. Third film Cheriyo Darling was co-produced by director Roy de Silva with his wife Sumana Amarasinghe for Roy-Sumana Films (RS Films). The film cinematography done by J.J. Yogaraja and edited by Densil Jayaweera. The final film of the franchise, Cheriyo Holman was directed by Parakrama Jayasinghe and co-produced by Raj Ranasinghe and Thilak Atapattu. Cinematography by G. Nandasena and edited by M. S. Aliman. All four films were music directed by Somapala Rathnayake.

== History ==
| Film | SL release date | Director(s) | Producer(s) | Story by | Composer(s) | Status |
Cheriyo series
| Cheriyo Doctor | October 11, 1991 | Roy de Silva | Thilak Atapattu | Roy de Silva | Somapala Rathnayake | Released |
| Cheriyo Captain | October 13, 1995 | Roy de Silva | Thilak Atapattu | Roy de Silva | Somapala Rathnayake | Released |
| Cheriyo Darling | October 25, 1996 | Roy de Silva | Sumana Amarasinghe | Roy de Silva | Somapala Rathnayake | Released |
| Cheriyo Holman | May 24, 2002 | Parakrama Jayasinghe | Thilak Atapattu; Raj Ranasinghe | Clive Martens | Somapala Rathnayake | Released |

== Timeline ==
| Year | Feature films |
|---|---|
| 1991 | Cheriyo Doctor |
| 1995 | Cheriyo Captain |
| 1996 | Cheriyo Darling |
| 2002 | Cheriyo Holman |

== Films ==
=== Cheriyo Doctor (1991) ===
Cheriyo Doctor, centering on the incidents occur within a mental hospital run by Professor. Incidents starts when Nurse Surangi falls in love with one of fake patient Chaminda Randenigala. After series of comedy incidents, Chaminda's friend Nalin also attended to the hospital with fake illness and Chaminda's realized that his sister Madhu falls in love with Nalin. However, Chaminda's mother Nayana Randenigala opposes their romantic behaviors and locked Madhu. With the help of hospital staff, Chaminda and Nalin fight against Nayana's thugs and win their fiancees.

=== Cheriyo Captain (1995) ===
Cheriyo Captain, centering on the incidents occur between an army group and a guerrilla group. Army group led by Captain Doson commands seven funny soldiers - Huntin, Ping Pong, Bantum, Kang Kung, Pabul, Tom Tom accompany with Tarzan. Guerrilla group led by Alphonsus who kidnap Varuni, only daughter of General Tagore. Captain Doson has informed to rescue Varuni and bring the guerrillas down. Along the course, Varuni's boyfriend Rahal and his friend joined the army troop at the jungle. After series of comedy events, army troop rescued Varuni and meantime destroy the bridge that connect the Army territory and Alphosus territory.

=== Cheriyo Darling (1996) ===
Cheriyo Darling, centering on the incidents occur when a popular actress Miss Sweetie attends to the mental hospital run by Professor. All the male workers at the hospital start to flirt around her to win her heart. Meanwhile, Sweetie's boyfriend enters to the hospital with a fake mental illness. However, after series of comedy incidents Gulliver and his henchman rushed to the hospital and looking to kidnap Miss Sweeties. With the final battle initiated by hotel workers, Gulliver flees with his troop and Miss Sweetie joins with her boyfriend and leave the hospital.

=== Cheriyo Holman (2002) ===
Cheriyo Darling is set in a hotel. Many people visit the hotel and reserve their rooms. Meanwhile the hotel is haunted by a ghost, "Mohini" (Dilhani) and all people are afraid of her horror incidents. Further information about the ghost is exhibited in the last part of the film. Until that moment, the film revolves around comedic incidents as well as hotel workers flirting with a beautiful girl, later known as the ghost.

== Cast and characters ==
| Cast | Film & Character | | | |
| Cast | Cheriyo Doctor (1991) | Cheriyo Captain (1995) | Cheriyo Darling (1996) | Cheriyo Holman (2002) |
|---|---|---|---|---|
| Bandu Samarasinghe | Marmite | Huntin / Fruit Salad | Marmite | |
| Tennison Cooray | Hospital attendant | Bantum | Doctor Dunath Mala | |
| Joe Abeywickrama | Professor | Captain Doson | Professor | |
| Freddie Silva | Doctor Coco / Virindu singer | Ping Pong | Doctor Coco | |
| Sumana Amarasinghe | Nayana Randenigala | Teena | Madam | |
| Nawanandana Wijesinghe | Patient | Tom Tom | Formalin | |
| Manel Chandralatha | Nurse | Nancy | Nurse | |
| Cletus Mendis | Cleet | Alphonsus | | |
| Sanath Gunathilake | Chaminda Randenigala | Rahal | | |
| Sabeetha Perera | Surangi | Varuni | | |
| Shashi Wijendra | Nalin | Rahal's friend | | |
| M. V. Balan | Security guard | Pabul | | |
| Wimal Kumara de Costa | | Kang Kung | Vegemite | |
| Susila Kottage | | Guerrilla girl | | |
| Mark Samson | Mark | Alphonsus' henchman | | |
| Lilian Edirisinghe | Head nurse | Mrs. Rambo | | |
| Teddy Vidyalankara | Chance's henchman | | | |
| Nihal Silva | Doctor Ko | | | |
| Nadeeka Gunasekara | Madhu | | | |
| Sunil Hettiarachchi | | Tarzan | | |
| Mervyn Jayathunga | | General Tagore | | |
| Sanoja Bibile | | | Miss Kitty | |
| Ronnie Leitch | | | Madha Kess | |
| Baptist Fernando | | | Mr. Fernando | |
| Bertrum Perera | | | Gulliver | |
| Ravindra Randeniya | | | Professor | |
| Dilhani Ekanayake | | | Miss Sweetie | Mohini |
| Ananda Wickramage | | | | |
| Manel Wanaguru | | | | |

== Technical crew ==
| Technical aspect | Film & crew | | | |
| Technical aspect | Cheriyo Doctor (1991) | Cheriyo Captain (1995) | Cheriyo Darling (1996) | Cheriyo Holman (2002) |
|---|---|---|---|---|
| Assistant director | Anton Kingsley; Nishantha Pradeep | | Chandana Edisiringhe | Saman Silva |
| Make-up | Ebert Wijesinghe | | Hemantha Gamage | Manoj Selvaraj |
| Sound coordination | George Manatunga | | | Lionel Gunaratne |
| Sound Engineer | M. A. A. Alwis | | | Lionel Gunaratne |
| Stunt direction | Teddy Vidyalankara | | Lal Kumara | |
| Choreography | Ronald Fernando | | Channa Wijewardena | |
| Art direction | Mohan Adams | | | Saliya Dias; Roshan Warnakulasuriya |
| Lyrics | Premakeerthi de Alwis; Somapala Leelananda; Alanson Mendis | Hemasiri Halpita; Somapala Leelananda | Hemasiri Halpita; Ananda Padmasiri | |

== Soundtracks ==
=== Cheriyo Doctor ===
| No. | Title | Singer(s) | Length |
|---|---|---|---|
| 1. | "Gee Nada Pawethe" | Gratien Ananda, Latha Walpola |
| 2. | "Sihina Lathaviya" | Ananda Perera, Maya Damayanthi |
| 3. | "Latin American song" | Sunil de Silva |
| 4. | "Sakala Sarin Piri" | Freddie Silva |
| 5. | "Vikara Loke" | Freddie Silva |
| 6. | "Bar Bar Eken Bila" | Freddie Silva |

=== Cheriyo Captain ===
| No. | Title | Singer(s) | Length |
|---|---|---|---|
| 1. | "Lo Balana Devide" | Latha Walpola |
| 2. | "Sansara Gee Raavaye" | Gratien Ananda, Latha Walpola |
| 3. | "Cheriyo Kiyala Me Api Yanne" | Gratien Ananda, Freddie Silva, Bandu Samarasinghe, Jayantha Rathnayake, Yohan Arjun |
| 4. | "Wedath Agei Hithath Hondai" | Gratien Ananda, Bandu Samarasinghe, Yohan Arjun |

=== Cheriyo Darling ===
| No. | Title | Singer(s) | Length |
|---|---|---|---|
| 1. | "Me Eka Eka Jathiye Leddu" | Freddie Silva, Ronnie Leitch |
| 2. | "Muhude Inne Eka Maluwado" | Ronnie Leitch |
| 3. | "Ruwa Manamalai" | Nirosha Virajini |
| 4. | "Monalisa Monalisa" | Ananda Perera |
| 5. | "Sudu Suranganavi" | Gratien Ananda, Latha Walpola |
| 6. | "Me Asai Bayai Mage" | Freddie Silva and film crew |
