= Somapala Rathnayake =

Sri Lankan music director

Somapala Rathnayake සෝමපාල රත්නායක
- Born: Rathnayake Arachchilage Somapala; 7 November 1947; Kadugannawa, Kandy, Sri Lanka
- Died: July 18, 2017 (aged 69); Colombo National Hospital
- Education: Kadugannawa Maha Vidyalaya
- Occupations: Actor; composer
- Spouse: Mary Margaret Mayadunne (m. 1970)
- Children: 4
- Parents: Rathnayake Arachchilage Don James (father); Abeykoon Mayadunnelage Sumanawathi (mother)
- Relatives: Victor Rathnayake (brother); Jayantha Rathnayake (nephew); Lelum Rathnayake (nephew)
- Awards: Sarasaviya Best Composer
- Musical career
- Genres: Pop; soul; rhythm and blues; Indian classical music
- Instruments: violin, harmonium, cello
- Years active: 1969–2016

Rathnayake Arachchilage Somapala (Sinhala:සෝමපාල රත්නායක; 7 November 1947 – 18 July 2017), popularly known as Somapala Rathnayake, was a Sri Lankan actor, composer, lyricist and musician.

== Personal life ==
Rathnayake was born on 7 November 1947 in a small village near Kadugannawa as the fourth of the family with 10 siblings. His father was Rathnayake Arachchilage Don James. He was popularly known as Rathnayake Veda Mahaththaya, was an apothecary and sang "noorthi gee," a type of Sinhala folk songs. His mother was Abeykoon Mayadunnelage Sumanawathi. He was educated at Kadugannawa Junior School and then attended to Kadugannawa Maha Vidyalaya for secondary education. He learned music under K.M. Sugathapala at the school.

One of his elder brothers, Victor Rathnayake is a renowned musician in Sri Lanka. Victor has two daughters and two sons from first marriage with Chithra Rathnayake. His daughter Chandani is a dancer and a vocalist. His elder son Jayantha Rathnayake was a renowned musician and composer. Jayantha started his music career as the keyboard player in Sihashakthi musical band. Jayantha was married as has one daughter and one son. His younger son Lelum is also a musician and singer who worked in a musical band. On 6 April 2020, Jayantha Rathnayake died at the age of 52 while receiving treatments at Apeksha Hospital, Maharagama.

In 1960s, he joined with farmer's army. After few years of work, then he joined with Wildlife Department. He worked in the job for only one month. He was married to longtime partner, Mary Margaret Mayadunne. He met Mary during music classes at Heywood academy. They married in September 1970. It was the only day that he shaved his beard completely. She is a retired music teacher. The couple has four children, where one died at very small age. His daughter and two sons are not related to music.

On 17 July 2017, he was admitted to the Colombo National Hospital due to a sudden illness. He died on 18 July 2017 at the age of 69 while receiving treatments. The remains were placed at his residence at No: 78/C, Bopitiya Road, Uswetakeiyawa. The funeral took place on 20 July 2017 at the Hunupitiya Cemetery.

== Music career ==
He went to M.G.P music academy to learn music under Ananda Perera's father. In 1968, he attended to the State Music College, now known as the Institute of Aesthetic Studies. Then he learned Western music under R.A. Chandrasena. At that time, he attended to the music classes conducted by Premasiri Khemadasa. He started to play cello under the guidance of M. K. Rocksamy and then from Miss Joyce at Ceylon Symphony. He became the only cello artist in the preceding years of 60s and 70s in every film.

Rathnayake joined cinema as a backing violin player under Khemadasa for the film Hanthane Kathawa directed by Sugathapala Senarath Yapa in 1969. The country's first cartoon film, Dutugemunu by Givantha Arthasadge was his first film as a musical director. Unfortunately, the film was only screened one day. Subsequently, he composed music for the blockbuster film Handaya. The film won several awards and received positive reviews from critics. His composed the popular song Kawuruda Kawuruda Dan Lokko in that film.

Rathnayake was the music director for many films directed by Gamini Fonseka such as Uthumaneni, Sagarayak Meda, Koti Waligaya and Nomiyena Minisun. He composed the song Paaradise sung by H.R. Jothipala and Desmond Rodrigo. He made the lyrics for the song Mihipita Bim Agalak sung by W.D. Amaradeva for the film Nomiyena Minisun.

He was the music director for all the films directed by Dinesh Priyasad including, Demodara Palama and Peralikarayo. Then he continued to work in many blockbuster commercial films of Roy de Silva such as Re Daniel Dawal Migel film series, Jonsun and Gonsun, Cheriyo film series and Sepata Dukata Sunny. He had to compose music for Hindi tunes in certain Sinhala films such as Jaya Mangalam Suba Mangalam song sung by Jothipala for the film Peralikarayo This song was the last film song written by Karunaratne Abeysekera. Jothipala has sung to his music in many films such as Ridee Thella, Waradata Danduwam, Paaradise and Peralikarayo.

He was also awarded the Sarasaviya Award for Best Music Director for the film Ekada Wahi directed by Parakrama Jayasinghe. He also acted in that film. Rathnayake's maiden cinema acting came through the 1992 film Raja Daruwo directed by Daya Wimalaweera. For that film, he composed the popular song Dilidune Daruwane Mage sung by Gratien Ananda. He also composed music for several television serials such as Sannaliyane and acted in the serial Kiri Kandulak.

Apart from that, Rathnayake also composed music for television cartoons. His song Muhuda Mage Goda Bimai in the cartoon "Dosthara Honda Hitha" gained large popularity. He composed the most number of Christian songs as a Buddhist.

== Filmography ==
Year	Film	Roles
1969	Hanthane Kathawa	Violinist
1976	Nilla Soya	Lyricist
1979	Dutugemunu	Composer
1979	Handaya	Composer
1979	Podi Malli	Celloist ("Kohe Sita")
1980	Uthumaneni	Composer
1981	Sagarayak Meda	Composer
1981	Ridee Thella	Composer
1983	Subodha	Composer
1984	Podi Ralahami	Composer
1984	Sahodariyakage Kathawa	Composer
1986	Peralikarayo	Composer
1986	Koti Waligaya	Composer
1987	Sathyagrahanaya	Composer
1987	Kele Kella	Composer
1987	Nommara Ekai	Composer
1989	Okkoma Rajawaru	Composer
1989	Waradata Danduwam	Composer
1990	Hondin Naththam Narakin	Composer
1990	Honda Honda Sellam	Composer
1990	Hitha Honda Puthek	Composer
1991	Paaradise	Composer
1991	Hithata Dukak Nathi Miniha	Composer
1991	Cheriyo Doctor	Composer
1992	Oba Mata Wishwasai	Composer
1992	Raja Daruwo	Actor
1993	Weli Sulanga	Composer, Music supervisor
1993	Surayan Athara Veeraya	Composer
1993	Come O'Go Chicago	Composer
1993	Bambasara Bisaw	Composer
1994	Nohadan Landune	Composer
1994	Nomiyena Minisun	Composer
1994	Love 94	Composer
1994	Eka Da Wahi	Composer, Actor
1994	Hello My Darling	Composer
1995	Ira Handa Illa	Composer
1995	Demodara Palama	Composer
1995	Edath Chandiya Adath Chandiya	Composer, music supervisor
1995	Cheriyo Captain	Composer
1995	Chandani	Composer
1995	Vijay Saha Ajay	Composer
1996	Hiru Sanduta Madivee	Music Arranger
1996	Naralowa Holman	Composer
1996	Seema Pawuru	Composer
1996	Cheriyo Darling	Composer
1997	Puthuni Mata Wasana	Composer
1997	Ramba Saha Madhu	Composer
1997	Aparaye Thappara 84000k	Composer
1998	Re Daniel Dawal Migel	Composer
1998	Anthima Reya	Composer
1998	Sexy Girl	Composer
1998	Mohothin Mohotha	Composer
1999	Kolompoor	Composer, Poosari (acting)
1999	Koti Sana	Composer
2000	Anuragaye Ananthaya	Music Arranger
2000	Re Daniel Dawal Migel 2	Composer
2000	Kauda Bole Alice	Composer
2000	Pem Kekula	Composer
2001	Hai Baby Hai	Composer
2001	Oba Magema Wewa	Composer
2001	Pissu Puso	Composer
2001	Jonsun and Gonsun	Composer
2002	Parliament Jokes	Composer
2002	Mamath Geheniyak	Composer
2002	Sansara Prarthana	Composer
2002	Cheriyo Holman	Composer
2002	Kama Suthra	Composer
2002	Onna Babo	Composer
2002	Love 2002	Composer
2002	Somy Boys	Composer, music supervisor
2003	Ping Pong	Composer
2003	Sepata Dukata Sunny	Composer
2003	Numba Nadan Apita Pissu	Composer, music supervisor
2003	Jim Pappa	Composer
2004	Re Daniel Dawal Migel 3	Composer
2004	Selamuthu Pinna	Composer
2005	One Shot	Composer
2006	Naga Kanya	Composer
2006	Supiri Balawatha	Composer
2010	Dakina Dakina Mal	Composer
2010	Thank You Berty	Composer
2012	Daruwane	Composer
2013	Kauda Machan Alice	Composer
2013	Doni	Composer
2014	Que Sera	Composer
2014	Duwana Muwan	Composer
2016	Sinhaya	Composer
