= Jayantha Rathnayake =

Sri Lankan musician (1969–2020)

Jayantha Rathnayake ජයන්ත රත්නායක
- Born: Rathnayake Arachchilage Jayantha Rathnayake; 8 August 1968; Colombo, Sri Lanka
- Died: 6 April 2020 (aged 51); Colombo, Sri Lanka
- Education: D. S. Senanayake College
- Occupation: Musician
- Father: Victor Rathnayake
- Relatives: Somapala Rathnayake (uncle)
- Musical career
- Genres: Pop; soul; rhythm and blues; Indian classical music
- Instruments: Vocals, keyboard
- Years active: 1983–2019
- Labels: Nilwala; Ransilu

Rathnayake Arachchilage Jayantha Rathnayake (Sinhala: ජයන්ත රත්නායක; 8 August 1968 – 6 April 2020), popularly known as Jayantha Rathnayake, was a renowned music composer, music director and a singer. One of the most popular musicians in Sri Lanka, Jayantha rose to prominence with the musical band Siha Shakthi.

== Personal life ==
He was born on 8 August 1968 in Colombo, Sri Lanka as the eldest child in a family with four siblings. He completed education from D. S. Senanayake College, Colombo 8. He was married and was a father of one son and one daughter.

He has been receiving treatment for cancer at the Apeksha Hospital in Maharagama for a long time. The first cancer-related chemotherapy was done in July 2018. After that he had to stay in the hospital for two days for every two weeks while continuing to take the medicine. In his final years, Jayantha and Lelum had a rift with his father, because of his father's second marriage. Meanwhile, the father obtained a legal notice banning all songs from singing.

He died on 6 April 2020 at the age of 51 while receiving treatments. His remains were kept at the Mahinda Panagoda Florist, Koswatta, Thalangama. The funeral took place on 8 April 2020 at Talahena, Malabe public cemetery.

== Family background ==
His father Victor Rathnayake is one of the most respected musicians in Sri Lanka. In a career spanning for more than five decades, Victor has contributed to the background music for many films as well as composed several memorable tunes. His mother Chithra Rathnayake was a housewife. Jayantha has two sisters, Chandani, Manjula and one brother, Lelum. Chandani Rathnayake was a dancer and a vocalist. His brother Lelum is also a musician and singer who worked in a musical band.

His uncle Somapala Rathnayake was a renowned musician in Sri Lanka, who worked mostly in background music for many Sinhala films and television serials. He died in July 2016 at the age of 70.

== Career ==
Even though his parents forced him to do medicine, his passion was towards music grew since his child age. During school times, he became a regular member in the school choir and works at several school concerts. At the age of 12 under the guidance of Premakeerthi de Alwis, he created a melody for his father to sing in ‘Aradhana Swara Dehena’ radio program. Meanwhile, he played Melodica for the two songs, Thani Wennata Mage Lowe and Thuru Lapalu Lathawo in the SA concert.

After school, Jayantha lead the band 'Rajantha Miyasiya'. After few years, he joined 'Shakthi' band which later became 'Siha Shakthi'. During this period, he associated with renowned musicians such as Ananda Perera, Anthony Surendra, Sangeeth Wickramasinghe and Jayantha Gallage. He served as the keyboard player in the Sihashakthi band for many years and made the popular songs Oraire, Nilambare Sudu Paravi, Parasidu Karaliyadda, Sanda Muwawela and Sriya Manamath Vee. Meanwhile, he became a usual member of his father's SA Concert. The song Podi Kumarihamiye was sung at the concert with just two musical instruments, Tabla and Harmonium. In that song, Jayantha became the successor to Alien de Zoysa to play the Harmonium. Later, he became the event manager and overall music director of SA concert.

After some years, Jayantha recorded few original songs including the patriotic song Ruwan Bima and a set of romantic songs. In all the songs, he composed music and recorded for his first CD. He also joined with Sri Lanka Rupavahini Corporation and contributed many children's programmes with melodies. Along with his brother Lelum, he released a CD called 'Esala Nil Sanda'. He also provided music for many musical programs, chat programs and advertisements. In 2013, he became the music director for the film Peeter One directed by Bandu Samarasinghe.

On 7 April 2019, a musical concert was held at the RIT Alles Auditorium, DS Senanayake College to contribute towards medical expenditure for his cancer treatment.
