= It's a Matter of Love =

2011 film directed by Roy de Silva

- Film poster
- Directed by: Roy de Silva
- Written by: Roy de Silva
- Produced by: Sumana Amarasinghe
- Starring: Anarkali Akarsha; Saranga Disasekara; Vijaya Nandasiri
- Cinematography: Pushpakumara Bandara
- Edited by: Pravin Jayaratne
- Release date: 2 June 2011
- Country: Sri Lanka
- Language: English

It's a Matter of Love is a 2011 Sri Lankan English romantic comedy film directed by Roy de Silva and produced by his wife Sumana Amarasinghe. It stars Anarkali Akarsha and Saranga Disasekara in lead roles along with Vijaya Nandasiri and Lucky Dias. It is the sequel to 1990 film It's a Matter of Time, which is Sri Lanka's first English film directed by a Sinhalese director.

The film marks the debut acting of popular actor Ronnie Leitch's daughter, Keishiya Leitch. The movie premiered at LA’s Vista cinema hall and then screened in other theaters around the country.

== Cast ==
- Anarkali Akarsha as Natasha
- Saranga Disasekara as Malan
- Vijaya Nandasiri as Robert
- Lucky Dias as Malan's father
- Rosy Senanayake as Natasha's mother
- Iranganie Serasinghe as Chathuri's grandmother
- Ronnie Leitch as Jennifer's father
- Nehara Pieris as Jennifer
- Corrine Almeida as Jennifer's mother
- Keishiya Leitch as Chathuri
- Sudharshana Bandara as Shaun
- Sumana Amarasinghe
