= Gemunu Wijesuriya =

Sri Lankan actor (1934–2007)

- ගැමුණු විජේසූරිය
- Born: 5 August 1931; Dewalapola, Sri Lanka
- Died: March 19, 2007 (aged 75); Colombo
- Education: Udugampola Maha Vidyalaya
- Occupations: Broadcaster, comedian
- Employer: Radio Ceylon / Sri Lanka Broadcasting Corporation
- Known for: Acting, singing and producing radio programmes

Gamunu Mahinda Wijesuriya (5 August 1934 – 19 March 2007: as Sinhala: ගැමුණු විජේසූරිය), was an actor in Sri Lankan cinema, theatre, radio and television as well as a broadcaster, comedian, singer and radio program producer.

== Personal life ==
Wijesuriya was born on 5 August 1934 in Dewalapola, Sri Lanka. He studied at Udugampola Maha Vidyalaya. He was married to Maali and had two children.

Wijesuriya died on 19 March 2007 in Colombo.

== Career ==
He started his career as a radio artist joining the Radio Ceylon (currently known as Sri Lanka Broadcasting Corporation) with Lama Pitiya, a popular radio programme produced by Karunaratne Abeysekera for the children of the country. He was a popular radio artist and comedian who contributed the radio programmes like Muwanpalassa and Vinoda Samaya and he contributed to the Sinhala Cinema as an actor for Sinhala films like Dulika, Thun Man Handiya, Hara Lakshaya, Handaya, Binaramalee and Re Daniel Dawal Migel 2.

Wijesuriya gave his voice for some Tele-Cartoons like Dosthara Hondahita and Pissu Poosa produced by Titus Thotawatte for Rasaara telecast by Sri Lanka Rupavahini Corporation. He was capable of performing with many different voices to different characters in the same programme.

== Filmography ==
Year	Film	Role	Ref.
1966	Kapatikama	Appuhamy	
1967	Hathara Kendare		
1968	Bicycle Hora		
1969	Binaramalee	Ranhamy	
1970	Thewatha		
1970	Thunman Handiya	Aisey	
1972	Lokuma Hinawa	Benjamin	
1974	Duleeka		
1977	Maruwa Samaga Wase	Seema	
1979	Muwan Palessa	Veddah Mahathaya	
1979	Handaya	Abaran, Susie's husband	
1980	Muwan Palessa 2	Gurunnnanse Mama / Pina	
1983	Muwan Palessa 3	Pina	
1984	Sahodariyakage Kathawa		
1990	Walawwe Hamu		
2000	Re Daniel Dawal Migel 2	Uncle Lathara	
2001	Hai Hui Babi Achchi	Bab C. Walgampaya aka Babi Achchi	
2001	Jonsun and Gonsun	Rathnayake Mudiyanse	
2003	Vala in London	Helped slumdweller's husband	
2004	Re Daniel Dawal Migel 3	Uncle Lathara	
2009	Leader		

== See also ==
- Karunaratne Abeysekera
- Titus Thotawatte
