= Hai Hui Babi Achchi =

2001 film by Herbert Ranjith Peiris

Hai Hui Babi Achchi හායි හූයී බබි ආච්චී
- Directed by: Herbert Ranjith Peiris
- Written by: Herbert Ranjith Peiris
- Based on: Herbert Ranjith Peiris
- Produced by: Lalindra Films
- Starring: Bandu Samarasinghe; Gemunu Wijesuriya; Sanjeewa Mallawarachchi
- Cinematography: G. Nandasena
- Edited by: Srilal Priyadeva
- Music by: Sarath de Alwis
- Release date: 3 July 2001
- Country: Sri Lanka
- Language: Sinhala

Hai Hui Babi Achchi (Sinhala: හායි හූයී බබි ආච්චී) is a 2004 Sri Lankan Sinhala comedy masala film directed by Herbert Ranjith Peiris and produced by Lalindra Wijewickrama for Lalindra Films. It stars Bandu Samarasinghe in lead role along with Sanjeewa Mallawarachchi, Gemunu Wijesuriya, and Quintus Weerakoon. Music composed by Sarath de Alwis. It is the 956th Sri Lankan film in the Sinhala cinema.

== Cast ==
- Bandu Samarasinghe as Sahabandu 'Miss Dimple Mylawa'
- Gemunu Wijesuriya as Baby C. Walgampaya 'Babi Achchi'
- Quintus Weerakoon as Talwathu Mohandiramge Bandara Kimbulapitiya
- Sanjeewa Mallawarachchi as Rupika
- Rathna Sumanapala as Dottie Auntie 'Chin Chin Nona'
- Wimal Kumara de Costa as Costa
- Sunil Hettiarachchi as Pussella
- Ronnie Leitch as Malu Kade Jora 'Wickramabahu Podi Appu'
- Sunil Perera as Bele Kade Saima 'Kapirimudukuwe Gotaimbre'
- Anura Bandara Rajaguru as Titty Boy
- Sasanthi Jayasekara as Payodara
- Swarnamali Jayalath as Yasodara

== Soundtrack ==
No.	Title	Singer(s)	Length
1.	"Pinbara Roobara Siriyawiye"	Bandu Samarasinghe, Maya Damayanthi, Mervyn Malewana, Corrine Almeida
2.	"Ae Dimple Nangiya"	Rohini Kuruwita, Maya Damayanthi, Mervyn Malewana, Victor Vijayantha
3.	"Dotti Dotti Bodime"	Sunil Perera, Bandu Samarasinghe, Gemunu Wijesuriya
