= Jonsun and Gonsun =

2001 film by Roy de Silva

Jonsun and Gonsun ජොන්සන් ඇන්ඩ් ගොන්සන්
- Directed by: Roy de Silva
- Written by: Roy de Silva
- Starring: Ranjan Ramanayake; Tennyson Cooray; Sangeetha Weeraratne
- Cinematography: G. Nandasena
- Edited by: Densil Jayaweera
- Music by: Somapala Rathnayake
- Distributed by: E.A.P Films
- Release date: 26 July 2001
- Country: Sri Lanka
- Language: Sinhala

Jonsun and Gonsun (Sinhala: ජොන්සන් ඇන්ඩ් ගොන්සන්), or colloquially as Jonson and Gonson, is a 2001 Sri Lankan Sinhalese romantic comedy film directed by Roy de Silva. It stars Ranjan Ramanayake, Tennyson Cooray, and Sangeetha Weeraratne in lead roles along with Gemunu Wijesuriya, Jayantha Bopearachchi and Sunil Hettiarachchi. Music composed by Somapala Rathnayake. It is the 959th Sri Lankan film in the Sinhalese cinema.

== Plot ==
Sanjay Ranasinghe, son of a high class family and Dingiri Manika, daughter of a cultured village family; met accidentally at a Railway Station. As both of them miss the train, they had to wait at the station all night. As both of them went to their respective houses, they found their suitcases exchanged. Sanjay and his relative brother, Jonsun went to Manika's house to get the suitcase. Sanjay fell in love with Manika and plans a strategy to stay in Manika's house pretending to be guards. In the house, they meet a talking cow named Jonsun who helps them in their strategy. The story continues as how Sanjay and Manika protects their love beside the pressure of their families.

== Cast ==
- Ranjan Ramanayake as Sanjay Ranasinghe
- Tennyson Cooray as Jonson
- Sangeetha Weeraratne as Rathnayake Mudiyanselage Dingiri Menika and Inspector Durga
- Gemunu Wijesuriya as Rathnayake Mudiyanse 'Ralahamy'
- Sumana Amarasinghe as Mrs. Ranasinghe
- Sunil Hettiarachchi as Awatheva
- Jayantha Bopearachchi as Ranjuka de Silva
- Ruwanthi Mangala as Kumari
- Mangala Premaratne as Heen Banda
- Ronnie Leitch as Thatta Sira
- Sandeepa Sewmini as Thatta Sira girlfriend
- Upali Keerthisena as Mr. Pusari
- Roy de Silva as Station Master
- Shiromi Priyadarshani as Station Master's wife
- Nirosha Thalagala in dance crew

== Soundtrack ==
No.	Title	Length
1.	"Sarigama Padanee"

No.	Title	Length
2.	"Sanda Raye"

No.	Title	Length
3.	"Ayi Mister Mage Passen Enne"

No.	Title	Length
4.	"Ahuwe Kiwwe Thaththa Hodin"
