= Peeter One =

- Sinhala: පීටර් වන්
- Directed by: Bandu Samarasinghe
- Written by: Bandu Samarasinghe
- Produced by: Akmal Wikramanayaka, Sisira S Senarathne
- Starring: Bandu Samarasinghe; Nilanthi Dias; Veena Jayakody; Rodney Warnakula
- Cinematography: Ruwan Costa
- Edited by: Sampath Wickramasinghe
- Music by: Jayantha Ratnayake
- Production companies: Films Lab Studio; Sarasavi Studio; Magic Lantern Studio
- Distributed by: E.A.P Films
- Release date: 11 May 2013
- Running time: 100 minutes
- Country: Sri Lanka
- Language: Sinhala

Peeter One (Sinhala: පීටර් වන්) is a 2013 Sri Lankan Sinhala comedy, family film directed by Bandu Samarasinghe and produced by Akmal Wikramanayaka and Executive Producer Sisira S Senarathne for Swarna Films. It stars Bandu Samarasinghe in lead role along with Veena Jayakody, Rodney Warnakula and Nilanthi Dias. Music for the film is done by Jayantha Rathnayake. The film became one of Sri Lanka's blockbuster movies with reaching more than 150 days in cinema theatres. It is the 1188th Sri Lankan film in the Sinhala cinema. This is the fourth film direction by Bandu Samarasinghe. His son Kanchana Samarasinghe and second daughter Rasoga Samarasinghe also introduced to the first time in cinema.

== Cast ==
- Bandu Samarasinghe as Peeter
- Nilanthi Dias as Sherine
- Rodney Warnakula as Waiter Jonty
- Veena Jayakody as Elizabeth Briganza
- Lakshman Mendis as Lorenso Sylvester
- Manel Wanaguru as Dalryn, Bryan's mother
- Sarath Kulanga as Chief Chef
- Kanchana Samarasinghe as Bryan
- Susil Perera as Peeter's friend
- Rasoga Samarasinghe as Monika
- Sunil Perera in cameo appearance
- Sisira S Senarathne as a Guest

== Soundtrack ==
No.	Title	Singer(s)	Length
1.	"Sulange Hemin Ennako"	Bandu Samarasinghe
2.	"Lassana Malakata"	Uresha Ravihari, Kumara Samarasinghe, Bandu Samarasinghe
3.	"Sanda Se Hiru Se"	Uresha Ravihari
4.	"Tomiya Kaluwara"	Bandu Samarasinghe
