= Cheriyo Holman =

Cheriyo Holman චෙරියෝ හොල්මන්
- Directed by: Parakrama Jayasinghe
- Written by: Clive Martens
- Produced by: Raj Ranasinghe; Thilak Atapattu
- Starring: Bandu Samarasinghe; Ananda Wickramage; Susila Kottage; Dilhani Ekanayake
- Cinematography: G. Nandasena
- Edited by: M. S. Aliman
- Music by: Somapala Rathnayake
- Production companies: Film Location Service; Sarasavi Studio
- Release date: 24 May 2002
- Country: Sri Lanka
- Language: Sinhala

Cheriyo Holman (Sinhala: චෙරියෝ හොල්මන්) is a 2002 Sri Lankan Sinhala comedy horror film directed by Parakrama Jayasinghe and co-produced by Raj Ranasinghe and Thilak Atapattu. It is the fourth and last film of Cheriyo film series, which is sequel to Cheriyo Darling. It stars Bandu Samarasinghe, Dilhani Ekanayake and Ananda Wickramage. Music for the film is done by Somapala Rathnayake. It is the 979th Sri Lankan film in the Sinhala cinema.

== Cast ==
- Bandu Samarasinghe
- Dilhani Ekanayake
- Ananda Wickramage
- Manel Wanaguru
- Susila Kottage
- Teddy Vidyalankara
- Janesh Silva
- Chathura Perera
- Upali Keerthisena
- Rajitha Hiran
