= Selamuthu Pinna =

Selamuthu Pinna සැලමුතු පින්න
- Directed by: Roy de Silva
- Written by: Roy de Silva
- Produced by: G. R. Padmaraj
- Starring: Athula Adhikari; Indika Upamali; Sanath Gunathilake
- Cinematography: G. Nandasena
- Edited by: Elmo Haliday
- Music by: Somapala Rathnayake
- Distributed by: EAP Theaters
- Release date: 22 August 2004
- Country: Sri Lanka
- Language: Sinhala

Selamuthu Pinna (Sinhala: සැලමුතු පින්න) is a 2004 Sri Lankan Sinhala romantic drama film directed by Roy de Silva and produced by G. R. Padmaraj. It stars two popular singers Athula Adhikari and Indika Upamali in lead roles along with Sanath Gunathilake and Cletus Mendis. Music composed by Somapala Rathnayake. It is the 1034th Sri Lankan film in the Sinhala cinema.

== Cast ==
- Indika Upamali as Mali
- Athula Adhikari as Janu
- Sanath Gunathilake as Sanath sir
- Cletus Mendis
- Rajitha Hiran
- Sumana Amarasinghe
- Damayantha Perera
- Sunil Hettiarachchi
