= Cheriyo Darling =

Cheriyo Darling චෙරියෝ ඩාලිං
- Directed by: Roy de Silva
- Written by: Roy de Silva
- Produced by: RS Films
- Starring: Joe Abeywickrama; Dilhani Ekanayake; Damith Fonseka; Bandu Samarasinghe
- Cinematography: J.J. Yogaraja
- Edited by: Densil Jayaweera
- Music by: Somapala Rathnayake
- Production companies: Film Location Service; Sarasavi Studio
- Release date: 25 October 1996
- Running time: 127 minutes
- Country: Sri Lanka
- Language: Sinhala

Cheriyo Darling (Sinhala: චෙරියෝ ඩාලිං) is a 1996 Sri Lankan Sinhala medical mystery romantic comedy film directed by Roy de Silva and co-produced by director himself with his wife Sumana Amarasinghe for RS Films. It is the third film of Cheriyo film series, which is sequel to Cheriyo Captain. It stars Joe Abeywickrama, Dilhani Ekanayake and Bandu Samarasinghe in lead roles along with Tennison Cooray, Ronnie Leitch, Freddie Silva, Wimal Kumara de Costa, Ravindra Randeniya, Sanoja Bibile, Sumana Amarasinghe & Damith Fonseka in supporting roles. Music for the film is done by Somapala Rathnayake and it is the 863rd Sri Lankan film in the Sinhala cinema. Widely regarded as one of the greatest Sri Lankan films ever made, Cheriyo Darling is the only Sri Lankan film in history to get a rating of 90% in the official 'Films.lk' Sinhala Cinema Database.

== Plot ==
State mental hospital is in chaos. Junior Doctors Dr. Coco & Dr. Dunnoth Mala gives anatomy lectures to nurses in a horny way. The head of Doctors: Emeritus Professor also flirts with the nurses. Hospital's head attendant Marmite drops a patient from the ambulance on his way to a surgery due to gross negligence. During the operation, Dr. Coco extracts a centipede from patient's abdomen while Professor drops his wrist watch and they stitch the patient. Meanwhile Madame, the Director of hospital holds an inquiry on Marmite. Dr. Dunnoth Mala and Marmite's girlfriend nurse Kitty tries to save him from being punished. The deputy head attendant Vegemite is caught trying to consume some Cola from a patient. Junior attendant Medha Kess accidentally pierce an injection to the buttocks of Head Nurse. In the wards at night, nurses, hospital staff and patients sing, dance and enjoy themselves. Dr. Dunnoth Mala misdiagnoses a patient dead and orders Marmite to take the corpse to the morgue where the patient wakes up and scares attendants. Professor investigates and declares in future, if there are similar doubts, the body should be embalmed and the benefit of the doubt should always go to the dead body. During another surgery, Dr. Dunnoth Mala takes opinions from attendants Marmite, Vegemite & Carbide and extracts a fish from an obese patient.

Meanwhile, popular film actress Miss Sweetie catches her wealthy boyfriend red handed with a prostitute and becomes furious. Simultaneously, she is bitten by the love bug to such an extent that she suffers from a mental imbalance and has to be admitted to the mental hospital. Madame calls a special meeting and arranges special care to her and during the meeting, the romance between Marmite and Nurse Kitty is revealed by fellow nurses when they sing Indrani Perera's song Ha Ha Hore Danuna. Following a grand welcome, all the male staff in the hospital are mesmerized by her beauty and are madly in love with her. This creates an unhealthy competition in the hospital. A Professor of Clinical Endocrinology is hired from another hospital and he observes that love pressure of Miss Sweetie has increased to Nahuthaya (Note: Increased to Nahuthaya (Sinhala: නහුතෙට නැගලා) is indicated when something is exponentially increased. In ancient Sinhala numerals Nahuthaya is equivalent to a Sextillion or 10^{21}.), and diagnoses her with a sexual arousal or in his own terminology an 'acute case of the taxidermy of the philanthropy of Mesopotamia'. Elated, Emeritus Professor and Miss Sweetie proceeds to court at night.

Dr. Dunnoth Mala orders Marmite to fetch a heart to the operation theater and he creates a mockery dropping it following a kiss from an off duty nurse and a dog scavenging the dropped heart. Nurse Kitty flirts with Marmite who is in an urgent need to urinate and tells she wants him to be a Doctor one day but due to the delaying and since the toilets are occupied, he urinates outside a window pane and drenches a patient. When some of the male staff tries to flirt with Miss Sweetie, she resists and this is heard by Nurse Kitty who tells Marmite she will become a Bhikkhunī if she is not loved by him. Marmite surrenders and she kisses him passionately. Meanwhile Dr. Dunnoth Mala proposes to Madame but she insists the romance to be kept a secret only until they are distracted by a man who brings a large Boa constrictor to the hospital to get it treated. Medha kess confuses two skeletons when he collides with Marmite and when Marmite seeks advise to differentiate the gender of those two, he gets scolded by Madame.

The Next day a group of bodybuilders, powerlifters and weightlifters arrive at the hospital and Miss Sweetie gets infatuated by their leader Gulliver. The main ward is distracted by a rodent who scares all the nurses. Nurse Kitty takes an overdose of a prescribed medication and turns into a vampire. Another meeting is called by madame and they decide that Gulliver is not a suitable partner for Miss Sweetie and since Nurse Kitty was still recovering from the overdose, they unanimously recommend Marmite to intervene. They try Medical students and nurses to convince Miss Sweetie but she only agrees that if anyone defeats Gulliver in a one on one fight, she will fall in love with the winner. After a ferocious battle, Gulliver overhead presses and slams Marmite who gets severely injured. At the same time, Miss Sweetie's boyfriend enters to the hospital with a fake mental illness and Gulliver and his henchmen kidnap Miss Sweetie. A final battle erupts involving all the staff and patients of the hospital and collectively they defeat Gulliver who flees with his troop. Miss Sweetie joins with her boyfriend and leave the hospital. Dr. Dunnoth Mala gives a rose to Madame and Nurse Kitty wins her love and kisses Marmite.

== Cast ==
- Joe Abeywickrama as Professor, Academic head of the hospital and Emeritus Professor of Neurophysiology and Cognitive Psychology
- Dilhani Ekanayake as Miss Sweetie, a popular film actress who gets sick
- Bandu Samarasinghe as Marmite, the head attendant
- Tennison Cooray as Doctor Dunnoth Mala
- Freddie Silva as Doctor Coco
- Shammi Fernando as Doctor Omelette
- Wimal Kumara de Costa as Vegemite, the deputy head attendant
- Ronnie Leitch as Medha Kess, a junior attendant
- Nawanandana Wijesinghe as Formalin, a junior attendant
- Baptist Fernando as Carbide, a junior attendant
- Mahesh Jayasinghe as a trainee attendant
- Susil Perera as a trainee attendant
- Susila Kuragama as Head Nurse
- Sanoja Bibile as Nurse Kitty, Marmite's girlfriend
- Shashikala Hettiarachchi as a Nurse
- Pushpa Gunawardena as a Nurse
- Chandrika Rathnamali as a Nurse
- Biyanka Shyamini as a Nurse
- Manel Chandralatha as Medical student
- Sumana Amarasinghe as Madame, the Director of hospital
- Ravindra Randeniya as Professor of Clinical Endocrinology
- Bertrum Perera as Gulliver
- Lal Kumara as Gulliver's henchman
- Baptist Fernando as Gulliver's sports manager
- Damith Fonseka as Miss Sweetie's boyfriend
- Anusha Damayanthi as Prostitute
- Don Guy as Charlie Chaplin patient
- Sunil Premadasa as Patient without teeth
- Joseph Seneviratne as Patient with broken leg

== Songs ==
The film consists of six songs.

No.	Title	Singer(s)	Length
1.	"Me Eka Eka Jathiye Leddu"	Freddie Silva, Ronnie Leitch	2:34
2.	"Muhude Inne Eka Maluwado"	Ronnie Leitch	3:15
3.	"Ruwa Manamalai"	Nirosha Virajini	4:10
4.	"Monalisa Monalisa"	Ananda Perera	3:02
5.	"Sudu Suranganavi"	Gratien Ananda, Latha Walpola	2:27
6.	"Me Asai Bayai Mage"	Freddie Silva and film crew	2:52
