= Sumana Amarasinghe =

Sri Lankan actress (1948–2022)

Sumana Amarasinghe සුමනා අමරසිංහ
- Born: Denipitiya Vithanage Sumana Amarasinghe; 21 February 1948; Kandy, Ceylon
- Died: 5 June 2022 (aged 74); Colombo, Sri Lanka
- Education: Mount Lavinia Buddhist Girls' College
- Occupations: Actress, film producer, assistant editor
- Years active: 1975–2022
- Spouse: Roy de Silva (1975–2018)

Denipitiya Vithanage Sumana Amarasinghe (Sinhala: සුමනා අමරසිංහ; 21 February 1948 – 5 June 2022) was an actress in Sri Lankan cinema and television. Performing in drama to comedy, she is usually known as the Sweet girl in Sinhala cinema. She also worked as an assistant director, production manager, costume designer and as a producer. She was also the only actress to contribute to the production, singing, co-directing, and co-editing of Sri Lankan cinema.

== Personal life ==
Sumana was born on 21 February 1948 in Ranawana, Katugastota, Kandy, Sri Lanka, as the second child in a family with six siblings. Her father worked in the Inland Revenue Department. Since her family could not stay in Kandy, they came to Colombo and stayed in a rented house in Mt. Lavinia. She first went to the Mount Lavinia Buddhist Girls' College and later to Kalubowila Buddhaghosha Maha Vidyalaya. She has one sister and four brothers.

Amarasinghe was married to Roy de Silva, who was also a renowned actor and director. She met de Silva during the 1969 film Hathara Peraliya. The wedding was celebrated on 30 August 1975. The couple had no children.

De Silva died on 30 June 2018 while treated for a heart attack at Sri Jayawardenepura General Hospital. His remains were buried on 2 July 2018 at Borella Cemetery.

In 2014, Amarasinghe was admitted to the hospital due to sudden illness. During her tour to India for a film, she is known to have had a drink which contained a germ. It has affected her liver as well as her heart. At one point her heart even stopped but she was able to recover slowly.

She was the owner of two beauty salons.

Amarasinghe died on 5 June 2022 at the age of 74 while receiving treatment at the Sri Jayewardenepura Hospital due to a sudden illness.

== Acting career ==
She contested the beauty pageant "Lassana Muhuna", while she was in school times and won the title. Then she acted in the film Hathara Peraliya directed by L.M. Perera. Her maiden cinematic experience came through 1967 film Pipena Kumudu, directed by Ruby de Mel. Her father allowed Sumana to go only for that movie due to Ruby de Mel. However, she lied to her father and later played a lot of other movies such as Rena Giraw, Dahasak Sithuvili, Samanala Kumariyo and Hathara Peraliya.

In addition to acting, she was involved in the beauty industry, where she learned beauty courses in India, Singapore, Canada in 1980. Her first major breakthrough came through 1975 film Sukiri Kella, which earned her nickname "Sweet girl in Sinhala cinema".

She acted in a few films with her real husband, which made a cult in Sinhala cinema. Then she joined Tissa Wijesurendra in many popular films screened for more than 100 days which include Sudu Paraviyo and Sithaka Suwanda. In 1982, she acted in Kadawunu Poronduwa remake, where she acted the role previously acted by Rukmani Devi. Even though she started film career with dramatic roles, she turned to comedy roles in later stages particularly through films directed by her husband. Some of her popular films are Binaramalee, Sunethra, Jonsun and Gonsun and Re Daniel Dawal Migel trilogy.

After the July 1983 riots, many producers left the film industry, however Sumana contributed to the production of films such as Tom Pachayā, Thaṇa Giravi, Sudu Piruvaṭa and Jonsan hā Gonsan. In addition, she has been a Production Executive, Line Producer, Local Coordinator, Singer, Editor, Assistant, Hairstylist and Costume Designer. She excelled in her artistic career and was one of the pioneers in founding the corporation "Hela Nalu Nili Coalition" in 1969 and fought for the establishment of a state corporation for the film industry for the manifesto of Sirimavo Bandaranaike's policies in the 1970 general election.

== Filmography ==
=== As actress ===
Year	Film	Role	Ref.
1967	Pipena Kumudu		
1967	Rena Giraw	Dissa's sister	
1968	Dahasak Sithuvili	Sagara's office receptionist	
1969	Hathara Peraliya		
1969	Binaramalee	Sobani	
1970	Sumudu Bharya		
1970	Den Mathakada	Somawathie	
1971	Samanala Kumariyo Samaga Api Kawadath Soorayo		
1972	Singappuru Chali		
1972	Hathara Wate		
1972	Me Desa Kumatada	Mala	
1972	Lokuma Hinawa	Renuka	
1973	Suhada Pathuma		
1973	Sinawai Inawai		
1973	Sunethra	Sunethra	
1974	Duleeka	Mano	
1974	Sheela	Anula Karunaratne	
1975	Mage Nangi Shyama		
1975	Sukiri Kella	Geetha / Sujee Gunathilake	
1975	Obai Mamai	Samanthie 'Saman' Jayasinghe	
1975	Ranwan Reka		
1975	Sadhana		
1975	Hadawathaka Wasanthaya		
1976	Mangala		
1976	Ran Thilaka		
1977	Pom Pachaya	Kalyani	
1977	Sudu Paraviyo	Kumari	
1977	Niwena Ginna		
1977	Honda Hitha		
1977	Neela		
1978	Sithaka Suwanda	Surekha Samson	
1978	Mage Ran Putha		
1978	Geethanjali		
1979	Nuwan Renu	Amitha	
1979	Samanmalee	Nithinda's wife	
1979	Anusha	Asha	
1980	Jodu Walalu	Sumana	
1980	Silva		
1981	Hondama Naluwa		
1981	Ajasaththa	Kosala Devi	
1981	Bamba Ketu Hati	Menika's Akka	
1982	Mihidum Sihina	Rajini	
1982	Pethi Gomara	Purnika	
1982	Kadawunu Poronduwa	Ranjani Jayasena	
1982	Rahasak Nathi Rahasak		
1982	Thana Giravi	Nayana Kulasekara / Daisy	
1983	Sumithuro		
1984	Hadawathaka Wedana		
1984	Birinda		
1984	Hitha Honda Kollek		
1985	Sudu Mama		
1985	Aya Waradida Oba Kiyanna		
1987	Thaththi Man Adarei		
1987	Ahinsa	Indu	
1988	Gedara Budun Amma	Menike	
1988	Angulimala		
1989	Okkoma Rajawaru		
1990	Christhu Charithaya	Herodias	
1990	Hitha Honda Puthek	Manike	
1990	Madhu Sihina		
1991	Cheriyo Doctor	Nayana Randenigala	
1992	Rumathiyai Neethiyai	Lawyer	
1992	Sathya		
1992	Okkoma Kanapita		
1993	Sasara Serisaranathek Oba Mage		
1993	Mawila Penewi Roope		
1994	Sudu Piruvata	Sujatha Ediriweera	
1994	Love 94	Mrs. Wickramasinghe	
1994	Nohadan Kumariye		
1995	Cheriyo Captain	Teena	
1996	Cheriyo Darling	Madam	
1997	Ramba Saha Madhu		
1998	Re Daniel Dawal Migel	Mrs. Kulawansha	
2000	Sansara Prarthana		
2000	Re Daniel Dawal Migel 2	Mrs. Kulawansha	
2001	Jonsun and Gonsun	Mrs. Ranasinghe	
2002	Love 2002		
2004	Clean Out		
2004	Ra Daniel Dawal Migel 3		
2004	Selamuthu Pinna		
2007	Mr Dana Rina		
2007	Hai Master	Piyambika	
2009	Sir Last Chance		
2011	It's a Matter of Love		

=== As producer ===
Year	Film
1982	Kadawunu Poronduwa
1977	Tom Pachaya
1982	Thana Giravi
1994	Sudu Piruvata
1996	Cheriyo Darling
2011	It's a Matter of Love

== Awards ==
=== Sarasaviya Awards ===
Year	Nominee / work	Award	Result
1970	Binaramalee	Merit Award	Won

=== Signis OCIC Awards ===
Year	Nominee / work	Award	Result
2018	Contribution to the cinema	International Felicitation Award	Won

=== Sumathi Awards ===
Year	Nominee / work	Award	Result
2019	Contribution to the cinema	U.W. Sumathipala Awards	Won
