= Sarungale =

Sarungale සරුංගලේ
- Directed by: Sunil Ariyaratne
- Written by: George Lesley Ranasinghe
- Based on: Dharmasiri Gamage
- Produced by: Y.M. Karunathilake; Ranjith Palansuriya
- Starring: Gamini Fonseka; Veena Jayakody; M. Abbas; Wimal Kumara de Costa
- Cinematography: W. A. B. de Silva
- Edited by: Gladwin Fernando
- Music by: Victor Ratnayake
- Release date: 2 March 1979
- Running time: 120 minutes
- Country: Sri Lanka
- Languages: Sinhala; Tamil

Sarungale (The Kite) (Sinhala: සරුංගලේ) is a 1979 Sri Lankan Sinhala drama thriller film directed by Sunil Ariyaratne and produced by Y.M. Karunathilake. It stars Gamini Fonseka and Veena Jayakody in lead roles along with M. Abbas] and Wimal Kumara de Costa. Music composed by Victor Ratnayake. It is the 413th Sri Lankan film in the Sinhala cinema.

The film deals with the inter-ethnic, communal violence between Sinhalese and Tamils. It demonstrate the ambivalence of the Sinhala socio-political establishment towards the Tamil people.

The film won several awards at OCIC film awards ceremony including Best Script. Farina Lai won the Live Talent Award, while Wimal Kumara de Costa and Gamini Fonseka won Special Jury Award at the ceremony. The film also won the Best Actor award and Best Supporting Actress award at 10th Sarasaviya Film Awards held on March 29, 1980, finished fifth with 27978 votes.

== Cast ==
- Gamini Fonseka as Nadarajah
- Farina Lai as Thangamani
- M. Abbas as Razan
- Wimal Kumara de Costa as Simon
- Veena Jayakody as Susheela
- Sriyani Amarasena as Soma, Simon's wife
- Rinsley Weeraratne as Gal Wathe Sira
- Karunaratne Hangawatte as Gune
- Somasiri Dehipitiya as Susheela's father 'Mr. Jayasekara'
- Shanthi Lekha as Susheela's mother
- Harry Wimalasena as Arresting Police Inspector
- Sisira Kumaratunga as Sira's accomplice
- Richard Weerakody as Sira's accomplice

== Songs ==
The film consists with four songs.

No.	Title	Lyrics	Singer(s)	Length
1.	"Bambarindu Bambarindu Kumata Wadinne"	Gamini Fonseka	W.D. Amaradeva, Nanda Malini
2.	"Isuru Devindu Umayangana"	Thillakaratne Kuruwita Bandara	Abeywardena Balasuriya, Niranjala Sarojini
3.	"Upan Hadaviye"	Kularatne Ariyawansa	M.S. Fernando
4.	"Tamil song"	Yoga Balachandra	P. Kalawathie
