= Handaya =

Handaya හඳයා
- Directed by: Titus Thotawatte
- Written by: Titus Thotawatte
- Based on: Story by Damith Totawatte
- Produced by: Totawatte Salaroo
- Starring: Henry Jayasena; J.H. Jayawardena; U. Ariyavimal
- Cinematography: Andrew Jayamanne
- Edited by: Titus Thotawatte; Sujatha Thotawatte
- Music by: Somapala Rathnayake
- Release date: 16 November 1979
- Running time: 135 minutes
- Country: Sri Lanka
- Language: Sinhala

Handaya (Sinhala: හඳයා) is a 1979 Sri Lankan Sinhala black-n-white children's film directed and produced by Titus Thotawatte for Thotawatte Salaroo. The film is cited as a legend in Sinhala cinema history. It stars many child actors along with Henry Jayasena, J.H.Jayawardana and Pearl Wasudevi in lead roles along with U. Ariyavimal and Gemunu Wijesuriya. Music composed by Somapala Rathnayake. It is the 434th Sri Lankan film in the Sinhala cinema.

The film received mainly positive reviews from critics and awarded in many local and international film festivals. Handaya received 8.8 of ratings from IMDb database.

== Background ==
Before screening in film halls, the film was screened few times for children orphanages around the country. The premiere screening of the film was celebrated on 2 November 1979 on 10am onward at the Savoy Cinema Hall with the presence of prime minister Ranasinghe Premadasa and lady Hema Premadasa. Film was released to public on 16 November 1979 on 6.30pm at Majestic Cinema with the presence of whole film crew. Film completed the showtime nearly for 150 days around 15 cinema halls of the fifth board.

== Television release ==
The film was telecasted on Rupavahini on every Saturday from 7 to 7.30pm as a six episode film.

== Cast ==
- U. Ariyavimal as Yousuf Nana
- Fantalian De Soysa as Thadi Piya
- G.B. Ilangakoon as Doctor
- Henry Jayasena as Mr. Perera
- P.G. Jayawardana as Teacher
- J.H. Jayawardena as Marshall
- Jayalath Manoratne as Commentator
- Karunaratne Abeysekera as Commentator
- Ivoen Panditharathna as Judge
- Rekha Samaratunga as Layisa
- Pearl Vasudevi as Suzee Akka
- Gamini Wickramanayake as Kota
- Gemunu Wijesuriya as Abaran
- Bandara K. Wijethunga as Double Kolama
- Ranjith Yainna as Serpinu
- Daya Alwis as Commentator box viewer

=== Child cast ===
- Pradeep Roshan Fernando as Sena (Lead)
- Kithsirimevan Jayasena as Sooppuwa (Lead)
- Dharshana Panangala as Ukkuwa
- Kasun Madurasingha as Chutte
- Viranga Indunil Galpihilla as Sister
- Sanjaya Abeygunawardana as Giya
- Sunny Nawagaththegama as Jine
- Shanthapriya de Silva as Sooppuwa's friend
- Nimal Kingsly Wijesingha as Anta
- Muditha Ranasingha as Bolaya
- Ekiyan Bacho as Tommy
- Suresh Ratnasingham as Sena's Friend

== Songs ==
No.	Title	Lyrics	Singer(s)	Length
1.	"Sihina Lowe Sita Aa Handaya"	Sunil Ariyaratne	Lalith Kumar Danchuwasekara, Kelum Wijesuriya, M. Mahingoda
2.	"Kawuruda Kawuruda Dan Lokko"	Arisen Ahubudu	Lalith Kumar Danchuwasekara, Kelum Wijesuriya, M. Mahingoda

== Awards and accolades ==
Handaya is the first Sri Lankan film to be awarded at the Italy International Film Festival, which was won in 1980.

- Best Children's Film 1980 at Italy International Film Festival.
- Special Jury Award for the Best Film at Presidential Award Ceremony.
- 1980 Sarasaviya Best Director Award
- 1980 Sarasaviya Award for the Best Producer
- 1980 Sarasaviya Award for the Best Script
- 1980 Sarasaviya Award for the Best Editor
- 1980 Sarasaviya Award for the Best Cinematography
- 1980 Sarasaviya Award for the Best Lyrics
- 1980 Sarasaviya Award for the Best Supporting Actor
- OCIC Award for the Creative Direction
