= Prostitution in Sri Lanka =

Prostitution is not illegal in Sri Lanka, however, related activities such as soliciting, procuring, and brothels are outlawed. It is also illegal to traffic persons for prostitution, especially minors. Prostitution is not as widespread in Sri Lanka as in some neighbouring countries. It is estimated that there are 40,000 prostitutes (known as "ගණිකාව" (Ganikawa)) in the country, and nearly half of them operate in Colombo.

Child Sex tourism and human trafficking are problems in Sri Lanka.

An Integrated Biological and Behavioural Survey (IBBS) conducted in 2013 revealed that the percentage use of condoms at last act of sex with a client was 93%, and an equally high percentage of 90% was revealed with non-paying partners. In an in-depth study of 30 sex workers in 2013, the majority (18 out of 30) of respondents pointed out that the police searched for condoms while questioning them, and arrested them, citing condoms as evidence of sex work. However, significant efforts have been made by the National STD/AIDS Control Programme (NSACP) in Sri Lanka to educate & train police on this matter, and the prevalence of this by police has been significantly reduced.

UNAIDS are running a programme to promote safe sex to the prostitutes.

== Legal situation ==
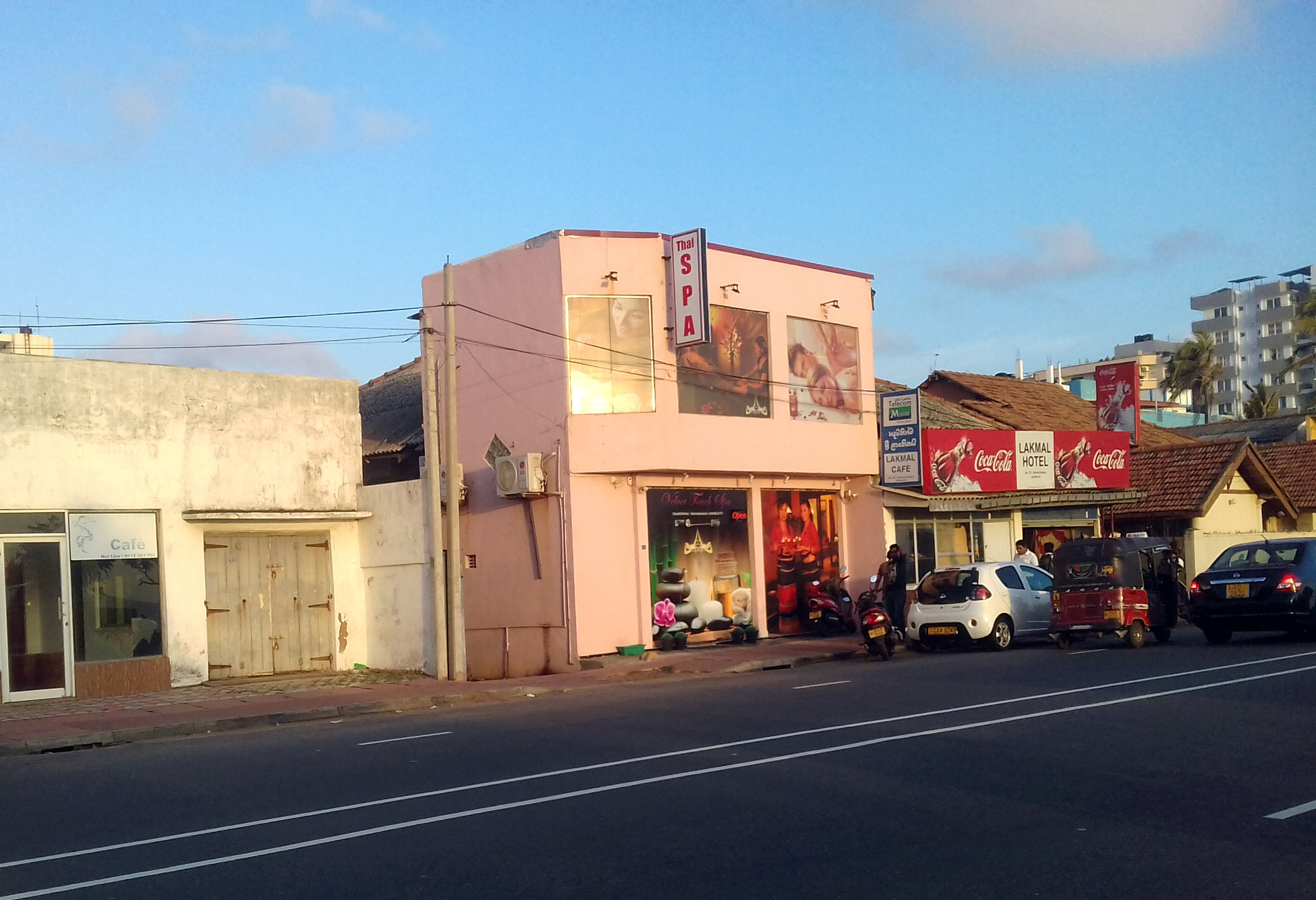
It is a typical Thai spa in Colombo. Massage clinics in Colombo could be part of prostitution in Sri Lanka.

Much of Sri Lanka's law surrounding prostitution dates back to the days of British rule.

The Vagrants Ordinance was introduced in 1842. Two sections are relevant to prostitution:

S2 – Punishment of persons behaving riotously or disorderly in the public streets.

Every person behaving in a riotous or disorderly manner in any public street or highway shall be liable to a fine not exceeding five rupees.

S7 – Soliciting and acts of indecency in public places.

(a) any person in or about any public place soliciting any person for the purpose of the commission of any act of illicit sexual intercourse or indecency, whether with the person soliciting or with any other person, whether specified or not;
(b) any person found committing any act of gross indecency, or found behaving with gross indecency, in or about any public place.

In 1889 the Brothels Ordinance was introduced. It provides punishment for any person who:

(a) keeps or manages or acts or assists in the management of a brothel; or
(b) being the tenant, lessee, occupier or owner of any premises, knowingly permits such premises or any part thereof to be used as a brothel, or for the purpose of habitual prostitution; or
(c) being the lessor or landlord of any premises or the agent of such lessor or landlords, lets the same, or any part thereof, with the knowledge that such premises or some part thereof are or is to be used as a brothel, or is willfully a party to the continued use of such premises or any part thereof as a brothel,

Section 360A of the Penal Code defines and prohibits procuring, Section 360B Deals with the sexual exploitation of children and Section 360C deals with human trafficking. In addition Section 365A (grave sexual offences), strengthens the legislation on sex with children and trafficking. (all added 1995).

== Sex trafficking ==
Sri Lanka is primarily a source, destination, and, to a lesser extent, a transit country for women and children subjected to sex trafficking. Some Sri Lankan women are subjected to forced prostitution in Cyprus, Maldives, Malaysia, Singapore, Thailand, and elsewhere. Within the country, women and children are subjected to sex trafficking in brothels. Boys are more likely than girls to be exploited in commercial sex in coastal areas for child sex tourism. In recent years, a small number of women from other Asian and Central Asian countries have been subjected to forced prostitution in Sri Lanka. Police reportedly accept bribes to permit brothels to operate, some of which exploit trafficking victims. Sub-agents collude with officials to procure fake or falsified travel documents to facilitate travel of Sri Lankans abroad.

The United States Department of State Office to Monitor and Combat Trafficking in Persons ranks Sri Lanka as a 'Tier 2' country.

== Bibliography ==
- A Study of Sex workers in Sri Lanka; An Example of Using Public Health Methodologies in Behavioral Research, Zeilan Press, USA (2007) – ISBN 978-0979362408
