= Cheriyo Captain =

Cheriyo Captain චෙරියෝ කැප්ටන්
- Directed by: Roy de Silva
- Written by: Roy de Silva
- Produced by: TK Films
- Starring: Joe Abeywickrama; Sabeetha Perera; Cletus Mendis
- Cinematography: G. Nandasena
- Edited by: Densil Jayaweera
- Music by: Somapala Rathnayake
- Release date: 13 October 1995
- Country: Sri Lanka
- Language: Sinhala

Cheriyo Captain (Sinhala: චෙරියෝ කැප්ටන්) is a 1995 Sri Lankan Sinhala comedy film directed by Roy de Silva and produced by Thilak Atapattu for TK Films. It is the second film of Cheriyo film series, which is sequel to Cheriyo Doctor. It stars Joe Abeywickrama, Sabeetha Perera and Cletus Mendis in lead roles with Sanath Gunathilake and Bandu Samarasinghe. Music for the film is done by Somapala Rathnayake. It is the 839th Sri Lankan film in the Sinhala cinema.

== Plot ==
Varuni (Sabeetha) is the only daughter of Major (Mervyn). During a party, former army man Alphosus (Cletus) kidnap Varuni and ask Major that he needs to marry Varuni. Major does not accept it and recruit captain doson (Joe) and his team to save Varuni from Alphosus. Captain doson with his seven army man start searching Varuni at a vast jungle. Meanwhile, Varuni's boyfriend Rahal (Sanath) with his friend (Shashi) also come to know that Varuni is kidnapped by Alphonsus. They also started to search her. The film then revolves around how Captain Doson's funny army crew save Varuni from Alphonsus with the help of Rahal and destroy the bridge that connect the Army territory and Alphosus territory.

== Cast ==
- Joe Abeywickrama as Captain Doson
- Sabeetha Perera as Varuni
- Cletus Mendis as Alphonsus
- Bandu Samarasinghe as Huntin/ Fruit salad
- Sanath Gunathilake as Rahal
- Freddie Silva as Ping Pong
- Tennison Cooray as Bantum
- Shashi Wijendra as Ravi, Rahal's friend
- Wimal Kumara de Costa as Kang Kung
- Harshana Nanayakkara as Tuntun
- Mervyn Jayathunga as General Tagore
- Sumana Amarasinghe as Teena
- Sunil Hettiarachchi as Tarzan
- Susila Kottage as Guerrilla girl
- Mark Samson as Alphosus right-hand man
- Navanandana Wijesinghe as Tom Tom
- M. V. Balan as Pabul
- Udaya Kumari as Kumari
- Manel Chandralatha as Nancy
- Chitra Wakishta as Party goer
- Lilian Edirisinghe as Mrs. Rambo
- Berty Gunathilake as Party goer
- Lionel Deraniyagala as Party goer

== Songs ==
The film consists with four songs.

No.	Title	Singer(s)	Length
1.	"Lo Balana Devide"	Latha Walpola
2.	"Sansara Gee Raavaye"	Gratien Ananda, Latha Walpola
3.	"Cheriyo Kiyala Me Api Yanne"	Gratien Ananda, Freddie Silva, Bandu Samarasinghe, Jayantha Rathnayake, Yohan Arjun
4.	"Wedath Agei Hithath Hondai"	Gratien Ananda, Bandu Samarasinghe, Yohan Arjun
