= Re Daniel Dawal Migel 3 =

- DVD Poster
- Directed by: Roy de Silva
- Written by: Roy de Silva
- Produced by: E.A.P Films
- Starring: Bandu Samarasinghe; Tennyson Cooray; Dilhani Ekanayake; Wasantha Bopearachchi
- Cinematography: G. Nandasena; Lalith M. Gomez
- Edited by: Densil Jayaweera; Pradeep Mahesh
- Music by: Somapala Rathnayake
- Production company: V.K Studio
- Distributed by: E.A.P Films
- Release date: 27 May 2004
- Running time: 142 minutes
- Country: Sri Lanka
- Language: Sinhala

Re Daniel Dawal Migel 3 (Sinhala: රෑ දනියෙල් දවල් මිගෙල් 3) is a 2004 Sri Lankan Sinhala comedy-action film directed by Roy de Silva and produced by Soma Edirisinghe for E.A.P Films. It is the third and final film in the Re Daniel Dawal Migel film franchise and the sequel to the 2000 Re Daniel Dawal Migel 2 film. The comic duo Bandu Samarasinghe and Tennyson Cooray reprised lead roles along with Dilhani Ekanayake, Jayantha Bopearachchi and Sanoja Bibile. The music for the film is done by Somapala Rathnayake. The film also became one of Sri Lanka's blockbuster hits in cinemas but failed when comparing the first two installments. It is the 1031st Sri Lankan film in the Sinhala cinema.

== Plot ==
Daniel and Migel started looking for a new life, calling themselves 007 and 008. The two began helping people by listening to their problems. They have a new friend, Pin Pon (Rajitha), who is the broker of all these problems.

Silva (Jayantha) and his friend (Damayantha) settled in Lathara's house, and Silva fell in love with Lathara's daughter (Dilhani). But Lathara does not like him and asks him to bring 2 lakhs and become a rich man, and then he will decide whether to allow them to marry.

Meanwhile, Victor (Ananda) is planning the death of his wife, Moreen (Sanoja), to acquire her millions in property and marry a new girl. Victor asks 007 and 008 to kill his wife, promising to pay them for it. The two try many ways to kill her, but none of them succeed.

Silva is also planning to kidnap the rich Moreen and demand money from Victor. However, with the help of Daniel and Migel, Moreen is kidnapped and explains her husband's secret life. Moreen is very disappointed and asks Daniel and Migel to punish him.

Finally, after a series of incidents, Victor is captured through the fake death of Moreen, which was staged as a drama to catch him and recover the money. Victor is jailed, Daniel and Migel get the money, and Lathara accepts Silva as his son-in-law.

== Cast ==
- Bandu Samarasinghe as 007 Daniyel
- Tennyson Cooray as 008 Migel
- Dilhani Ekanayake as Laethara's daughter
- Jayantha Bopearachchi as Silva
- Gemunu Wijesuriya as Uncle Laethara
- Sanoja Bibile as Moreen
- Rajitha Hiran as Pin Pon 000
- Nilanthi Diaz
- Ananda Wickramage as Victor
- Teddy Widyalankara
- Damayantha Perera as Silva's friend
- Upali Keerthisena as Mudalali
- Sumana Amarasinghe

== Soundtrack ==
No.	Title	Lyrics	Singer(s)	Length
1.	"Ra Daniel Dawal Migel"	Hemasiri Halpita
2.	"Sandawage Lassanai"	Hemasiri Halpita	Nuwan Gunawardana and Uresha Ravihari
3.	"Apita Hulan"	Hemasiri Halpita
4.	"Adare Karamu (baila)"
