= Re Daniel Dawal Migel 2 =

Re Daniel Dawal Migel
- Directed by: Roy de Silva
- Written by: Roy de Silva
- Produced by: E.A.P Films
- Starring: Bandu Samarasinghe; Tennyson Cooray, Ranjan Ramanayake; Sangeetha Weeraratne
- Cinematography: G. Nandasena
- Edited by: Densil Jayaweera
- Music by: Somapala Rathnayake
- Distributed by: E.A.P Films
- Release date: 31 March 2000 (Colombo)
- Running time: 150 minutes
- Country: Sri Lanka
- Language: Sinhala

Re Daniel Dawal Migel 2 (Sinhala: රෑ දනියෙල් දවල් මිගෙල් 2) is a 2000 Sri Lankan Sinhala comedy, action film directed by Roy de Silva and produced by Soma Edirisinghe for E.A.P Films. It is the second film of Re Daniel Dawal Migel film franchise and sequel to 1998 Re Daniel Dawal Migel 1 film and prequel to 2004 Re Daniel Dawal Migel 3 film. Actors from first film reprises their roles. It stars comic duo Bandu Samarasinghe, and Tennyson Cooray in lead roles along with Ranjan Ramanayake, Sangeetha Weeraratne and Maduranga Chandimal. Music for the film is done by Somapala Rathnayake. The film also became one of Sri Lanka's blockbuster hit with reaching more than 100 days in cinema theaters. It is the 932rd Sri Lankan film in the Sinhala cinema.

== Plot ==
At the end of the first film, Daniel (Bandu) and Migel (Tennyson) were jailed for more than 1,700 years. But they enjoyed their life in prison by dancing and singing songs with the other prisoners. The two were released after two years in jail by the President's pardon.

Just after coming out of jail, the two are attacked by the tailor who gave them their suits prior to their arrest. They run away naked after giving back the suits and are met by a newly wedded couple. They move to a hotel and act like two Indian superstars, and soon they are arrested by the police due to causing a nuisance to the public.

At the police station, the two see Chandi Ayya and ask what happened to him and Madhuri after their imprisonment. Chandi Ayya tells the story that he went to commit suicide and was rescued by Lathara's daughter, Wasana (Vasana). Madhuri went to see her mother-in-law with Sanjaya, and not much is known about her.

The three are released by the police, and they start to look for Madhuri. Chandi Ayya welcomes his two friends to Uncle Lathara's house. Lathara (Gemunu) is a musician who always plays the harmonium.

Meanwhile, Madhuri is caught by Richard, who is a drug dealer, and Detective Cobra's ally (Lietch) investigates her case and tells the story to Chandi Ayya and the duo. The three go to see Madhuri, and a fight takes place. Madhuri is rescued and brought back to Sanjaya, and she explains the past. The two reunite again and finally get married.

== Cast ==
- Bandu Samarasinghe as Ra Daniyel
- Tennyson Cooray as Dawal Migel
- Ranjan Ramanayake as Chandi Ayya
- Sangeetha Weeraratne as Madhuri
- Maduranga Chandimal as Sanjaya
- Roy de Silva as C.I.D Cobra
- Ronnie Leitch as Cobra helper
- Sumana Amarasinghe as Mrs. Kulawansha
- Vasana Danthanarayana as Wasana, Chandi Ayya love interest
- Gemunu Wijesuriya as Lathara, Wasana's father
- Lal Kumara as Richard

== Soundtrack ==
No.	Title	Lyrics	Singer(s)	Length
1.	"Api Pisso Raja Pisso"	Hemasiri Halpita	Nuwan Gunawardana, Sangeeth Wickramasinghe
2.	"Atom Bomb"	Hindi Song	Nuwan Gunawardana, Champa Kalhari
3.	"Shri Devi Nam"	Hemasiri Halpita	Nuwan Gunawardana, Champa Kalhari
4.	"Kauday Kauday"	Hemasiri Halpita	Nuwan Gunawardana, Sangeeth Wickramasinghe, Champa Kalhari, Kushani Sandarekha, Bandu Samarasinghe
5.	"Kaudo Kiya Ma Danne Na"	Hemasiri Halpita	Nuwan Gunawardana, Champa Kalhari
6.	"Ira Eliya Watena"	Hemasiri Halpita	Nuwan Gunawardana Kushani Sandarekha, Nirosha Virajini

== Sequel ==
The third and final installment of the franchise Re Daniel Dawal Migel 3 was released on 2004.
