= Victor Rathnayake =

Sri Lankan singer and composer

Victor Rathnayake වික්ටර් රත්නායක
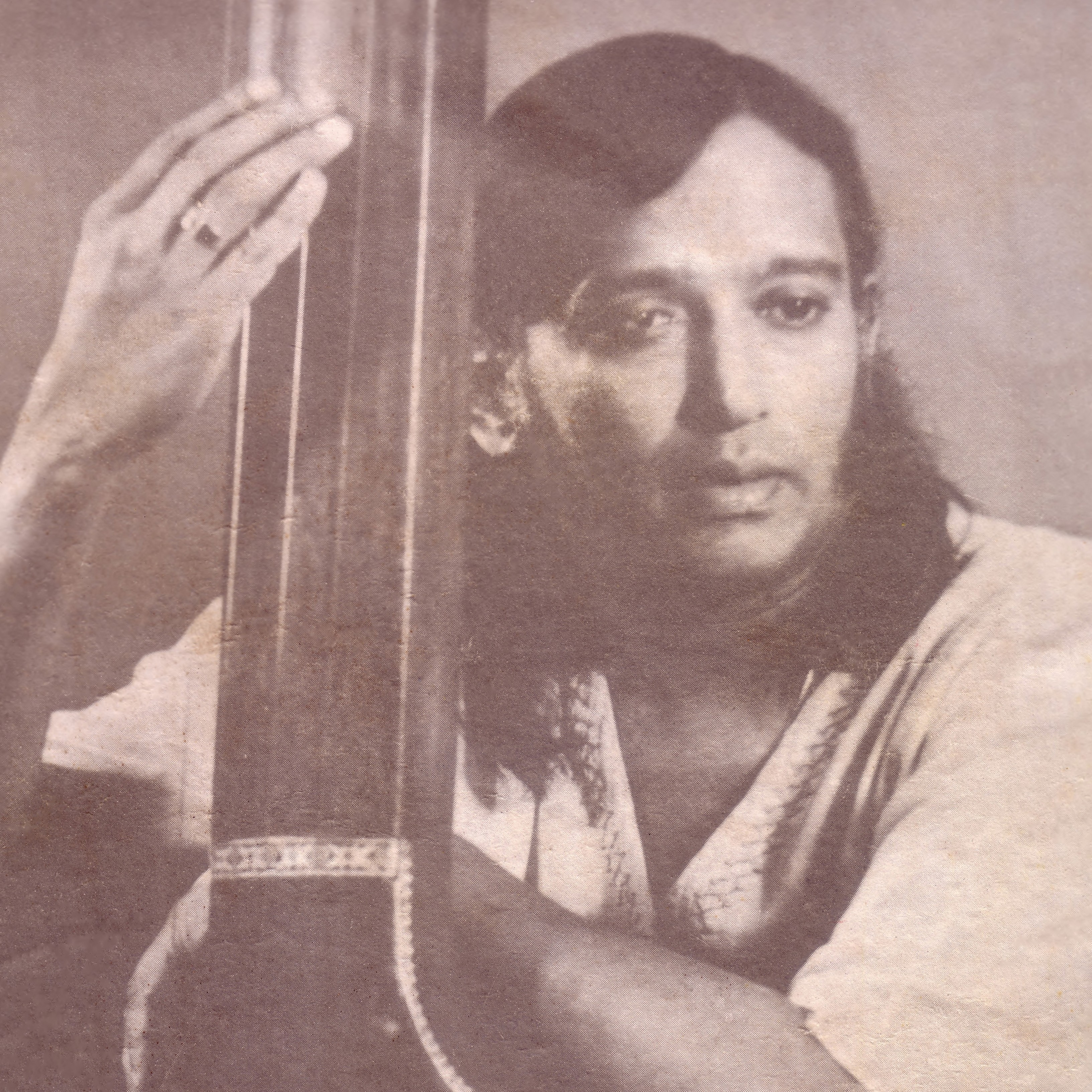
- Born: Rathnayake Arachchilage Victor; 18 February 1942 (age 84); Kadugannawa, Kandy, British Ceylon
- Education: Kadugannawa Maha Vidyalaya
- Occupations: Singer; composer
- Spouses: Chithra Rathnayake; Hashini Amendra
- Children: 4
- Parents: Rathnayake Arachchilage Don James (father); Abeykoon Mayadunnelage Sumanawathi (mother)
- Relatives: Somapala Rathnayake (brother); Jayantha Rathnayake (son); Lelum Rathnayake (son)
- Musical career
- Genres: Pop; soul; rhythm and blues; Indian classical music
- Instruments: Vocals, harmonium, violin
- Years active: 1958–present
- Labels: Nilwala; Ransilu
- Website: www.victorratnayake.lk

Rathnayake Arachchilage Victor (Sinhala:වික්ටර් රත්නායක; born 18 February 1942), popularly known as Victor Rathnayake, is a Sri Lankan singer, composer, lyricist and a renowned musician. He was the first Sri Lankan artist to hold a solo concert; His concert known as "SA" was first performed in 1973, and was an instant success. Rathnayake credits his success to his "fitting blend of Western music with Ragadari classical music." His songs deal with diverse themes that vary from love, to patriotism and Buddhism.

Matara Achchi is the first film he composed music for and its Sandakada Pahana song sung by Sunil Edirisinghe is still very popular among Sinhala music fans. Rathnayake also has composed music for films like Siribo Aiya, Podi Malli, Sarungale, Hulavali and Athuru Mithuru.

== Personal life ==
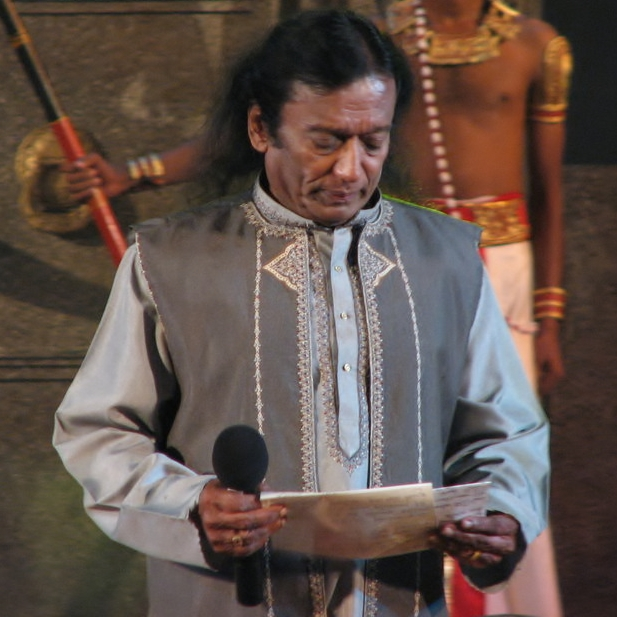
Ratnayake at a recent musical show

Rathnayake was born on 18 February 1942 in a small village near Kadugannawa as the third of the family with 10 siblings. His father was Rathnayake Arachchilage Don James. He was popularly known as Rathnayake Veda Mahaththaya, was an apothecary and sang "noorthi gee," a type of Sinhala folk songs. His mother was Abeykoon Mayadunnelage Sumanawathi. Victor was educated at Kadugannawa Junior School and then attended Kadugannawa Maha Vidyalaya for secondary education.

One of his brothers, Somapala Rathnayake was a renowned musician in Sri Lanka, who worked mostly in background music for many Sinhala films and television serials.

Rathnayake has one daughter and two sons from first marriage with Chithra Rathnayake. His daughter Chandani (d. 2016) was a dancer and a vocalist. His elder son Jayantha Rathnayake was a renowned musician and composer. Jayantha started his music career as the keyboard player in Sihashakthi musical band. Jayantha was married as had one daughter and one son. His younger son Lelum is also a musician and singer who worked in a musical band. On 6 April 2020, his elder son Jayantha Rathnayake died at the age of 52 while receiving treatments at Apeksha Hospital, Maharagama.

Rathnayake is currently married to Hashini Amendra, 40 years younger than him. Rathnayake was 75 years old at the marriage. Hashini is a bank employee.

== Early music career ==
His first music teacher was D.A.D. Dharmadasa. Under the guidance of school music teacher K. M. Sugathapala, Rathnayake performed first in both the 1958 and 1959 solo singing competitions of the All Island Inter-School Musical Competition. Victor got his first instrument at the age of nine when his father presented him a harmonium for his birthday. He studied singing and various instruments under musician Cyril Perera at the M.G.P. Institute in Mulgampola in his teens. In 1963, he began attending the State Music College, now known as the Institute of Aesthetic Studies. He wrote his first song, an ode to Buddha, in 1964; it received play on radio stations run by the Sri Lanka Broadcasting Corporation.

In 1969, Rathnayke joined the Ministry of Education as a music instructor, and was assigned to a post at Eththalapitiya Maha Vidyalaya in Bandarawela in 1966. He would later look back to his days as a teacher in his song "Sihil Sulang Ralle," which described the beauty of his surroundings that he noted as he travelled on the train to the school. The lyrics were penned by Sena Weerasekera on Rathnayake's recollections.

Rathnayke first recorded a song as a singer for the radio play Manichora by veteran lyricist Piyasena Costa. The song was Devangana Paradana Komala Katha. The first radio disc in Victor's name was in "Pancha Madhura" program produced by Madawala S. Peiris. The song Hade Susuman Pathitha Weemen was composed by the musician DR Peiris, written by Dalton Alwis. Then veteran lyricist Arisen Ahubudu wrote two songs for Rathnayake, Sende Binde Mohaduru Paapa and Golu Muhude Muthu Aete. He sang two songs in his maiden musical show as a professional artist. Mahagama Sekara was the first person to introduce Ratnayake into playback singing. Rathnayake sang the song Sara Sonduru Mal Patali with Nanda Malini for the film Hanthane Kathawa.

== 1970s ==
=== Sa Concert ===
By 1973, Rathnayake was a trained musician and noted that there were no concerts of solo artists. The closest was "Shravanaradhana" a joint concert by Amaradeva and Nanda Malini. On the urging of his friends Premakirthi de Alwis, Sunil Ariyaratne, K.D.K Dharmawardena, R.R. Samarakoon, Chintana Jayasena and Bandara K. Wijetunga, Victor decided to attempt such an event. The first Sa concert was held on July 20, 1973, at the Lumbini Theatre, Havelock Town. It is widely considered a turning point in Sri Lankan music.

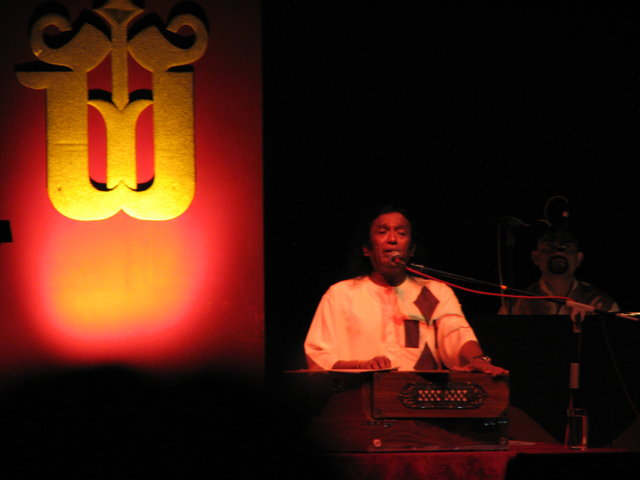
Ratnayake performing in his "Sa" concert

The name "Sa" came from the root or tonic note sa in the Indian music scale and was suggested by Chintana Jayasena. Jayasena pointed to the fact that no Sri Lankan drama, film or work of art bore a name of just one syllable at the time and believed that it would bring luck.

"Sa" was highly popular, and Rathnayke's gained many fans following its inception. One female fan wrote "Do you know that I treasure 49 hairs of yours?" in a fan letter, expressing how many times she has seen Rathnayake's show. Critics described the show as "exquisite insanity" and a "melodic lunacy" because of the fervor shown by Rathnayke's fans, who would sometimes attack auditoriums where he was playing when they couldn't get in.

Rathnayake's style was influenced by musicians like Sunil Shantha, Ananda Samarakone and C. T. Fernando who he considered "pioneers in the music field" for their use of "classical Ragadari and Hindustani music" as their starting point.

SA would feature his best known songs such as "Api Okkoma Rajawaru," "Api Marenne Nae," "Kurullanta Gee," "Podi Kumarihamiye," "Thotupola Aine," etc. Victor recorded these songs also for a multitude of labels in the 1970s and also recorded them for the SLBC. He would continue to produce material into the 1980s and 1990s.

=== Film Work ===
Victor Ratnayake debuted as a film music director with Mathara Achchi in 1973. With this film he would introduce Sunil Edirisinghe the brother of the director with the song "Sandakada Pahana." Victor himself would sing the fast-paced "Andura Bindinnata" for the film. Sunil would continue to be featured in other Victor Ratnayake helmed soundtracks of the 1970s such as Hulawali and Rajagedera Paraviyo. Victor would compose one of his most memorable songs for Sri Madhara (1978) - "Gaha Kola Mal" which he sang with Latha Walpola. Another major song from his film work was "Kohe Sita Oba" which he did for Podi Malli (1979). This song was featured in the movie with a taped performance from Sa of Victor performing the song.

=== Recent Events ===
Rathnayake continues to be a popular musician in the 2000s; After 39 years of success in Sri Lanka and in many other countries, Victor finally ended the concert on July 20, 2012 at the Lumbini theater where it started with the 1450th concert. His latest album 'Nil Kandu Yaaya' was released in February 2012.
He performed live at the BMICH on 13 December 2014 for an event, Victor Adasiyawasa, organised by himself.

== Albums ==
- Thani Tharuwe (1984)

== Filmography ==
=== As composer ===
| Year | Film | Other roles | Ref. |
|---|---|---|---|
| 1973 | Matara Achchi | Playback Singer | |
| 1975 | Rajagedara Paraviyo | Playback Singer | |
| 1976 | Haaratha Hathara | Playback Singer | |
| 1976 | Hulavali | | |
| 1977 | Sri Madara | Playback Singer | |
| 1978 | Anupama | Playback Singer | |
| 1979 | Sarungale | | |
| 1979 | Podi Malli | Playback Singer | |
| 1980 | Siribo Ayya | | |
| 1981 | Thawalama | Playback Singer | |
| 1981 | Sayuru Thera | Playback Singer | |
| 1981 | Vajira | Playback Singer | |
| 1986 | Athuru Mithuru | Playback Singer | |
| 1994 | Ambu Samiyo | | |
| 2003 | Irasma | | |
| 2018 | Adarei Man | Playback Singer | |

== See also ==
- W.D. Amaradeva
- Nanda Malini
- Sanath Nandasiri
- T.M. Jayaratne
- Gunadasa Kapuge
- Neela Wickramasinghe
