= Roy de Silva =

Sri Lankan actor and film director (1937–2018)

- රෝයි ද සිල්වා

Personal details
- Born: Chathurartha Devadithya Gardiyawasam Lindamulage Roy Aloysius Felix de Silva; 30 August 1937 Yatawatta, British Ceylon
- Died: 30 June 2018 (aged 80) Sri Jayawardenepura General Hospital, Sri Jayawardenepura Kotte, Sri Lanka
- Resting place: Kanatte Cemetery, Colombo
- Spouse: Sumana Amarasinghe (m. 1975)
- Children: 2
- Education: Yatawatta Sinhala School; St. Sebastian's College, Moratuwa; Saint Joseph's College, Colombo
- Occupation: Actor; director; producer; screenplay writer

Chathurartha Devadithya Gardiyawasam Lindamulage Roy Aloysius Felix de Silva, popularly known as Roy de Silva (රෝයි ද සිල්වා; 30 August 1937 – 30 June 2018), was a Sri Lankan actor and film director in Sri Lankan cinema. He entered the film industry as an actor in 1964 with Sujage Rahasa, directed by Palaniyaandi Neelakantan. He later moved towards cinema directing, becoming one of the most successful film makers in the Sri Lankan film industry. His blockbuster movies such as Re Daniel Dawal Migel series, Cheriyo series, Clean Out, and Sir Last Chance were economically successful and made hallmarks in the industry.

== Personal life ==
Born on 30 August 1937, as Chathurartha Devadithya Gardiyawasam Lindamulage Roy Aloysius Felix de Silva, he quickly changed his name to Roy de Silva in the beginning of his cinema career. He was born in Yatawatta, Matale as the fourth of seven siblings.

He first attended Yatawatta Sinhala School, and then moved to St. Sebastian's College, Moratuwa and completed advanced level from St. Joseph's College, Colombo. Just after completing school, he started to act in many stage dramas such as Narbona Hee Ranaweera Sebala and Surath Liliya.

He was married to fellow Sri Lankan actress Sumana Amarasinghe and they have two children. Roy died on 30 June 2018 at the age of 80. Sumana Amarasinghe died on 5 June 2022 at the age of 74 while receiving treatment at the Sri Jayewardenepura Hospital due to a sudden illness.

== Career as an actor ==
De Silva came to the silver screen through Sujage Rahasa directed by P. Neelakantan, a famous South Indian director who accompanied MGR as well. The film was released on 24 December 1964 and received a positive reception from critics. His success was achieved through stylish acting, Tamil Indian actor like personality and fluency in Tamil. This in turn gave him many opportunities to act under many Tamil directors in his early days.

In 1972, de Silva's film Sujeewa surpassed the gross earnings of Edath Suraya Adath Suraya, starring the most famous Sri Lankan actor of that time, Gamini Fonseka.

De Silva's acting career mostly came under directors like Joe Dev Anand, Danny Mariyadasan, M S Anandan, K Venkat, Kingsley Rajapakse, Robin Tampoe, Lenin Morayes, and Cyril P. Abeyratne.

De Silva had the ability to remember long dialogues.

== As a singer ==
Apart from direction and acting, De Silva also performed as a playback singer on a few occasions, such as in the films Tom Pachaya and Minisun Athara Minisek.

== Death and legacy ==
On 30 June 2018, De Silva died while being treated for a heart attack at Sri Jayawardenepura General Hospital. His remains were cremated on 2 July 2018 at Kanatte Cemetery.

On 1 September 2018, de Silva's autobiography was launched at Tharangani Hall. The book is titled Ada Siyawasaka Sadadara Roy.

On 5 July 2020, de Silva's wife Sumana Amarasinghe organized an alms giving at an old house in Colombo in two year commemoration of his death.

== Filmography ==
- No. denotes the number of Sri Lankan films in the Sri Lankan cinema.

Year	No.	Film	Role
1964	116	Sujage Rahasa	
1966	152	Sudu Duwa	
1966	155	Sanasili Suwaya	
1967	162	Sangawunu Menika	
1968	193	Ruhunu Kumari	
1969	213	Uthum Sthree	Mahindayaa
1969	212	Pick Pocket	Asoka
1970	222	Sumudu Bharya	
1970	227	Geetha	
1971	237	Dawena Pipasaya	
1971	247	Samanala Kumariyo	
1972	255	Sujeewa	Samantha
1972	256	Singapuru Charlie	
1972	260	Hathara Wate	Rohana
1972	263	Me Dasa Kumatada	Doctor Roy de Silva
1973	277	Sinawai Inawai	
1973	278	Sunethra	Upul Mahinda Seneviratne
1974	287	Sheela	Tissa Gunawardena
1975	306	Obai Mamai	Suminda Wijegunaratne
1975	312	Sukiri Kella	Senaka Dharmapala
1975	316	Mage Nangi Shyama	
1975	321	Ranwan Rekha	
1976	358	Ran Thilakaa	
1977	361	Sudu Paraviyo	Chandi
1977	371	Honda Hitha	
1977		Saazish	
1978	387	Mage Ran Putha	
1978	403	Deepanjalee	
1979	410	Samanmali	Amitha
1979	312	Minisun Athara Minisek	Keerthi
1979	427	Anusha	Sarath
1980	443	Silva	Chamika
1980	447	Adara Rathne	Lal
1981	531	Mihidum Sihina	Sinna
1981	484	Sanasuma	
1982	517	Pethi Gomara	
1985	624	Obata Diwura Kiyannam	
1987	670	Ahinsa	Jaye
1988	671	Rasa Rahasak	
1988	676	Amme Oba Nisa	
1988	677	Angulimala	
1989	688	Okkoma Rajawaru	
1990	704	Hondin Naththam Narakin	
1990	710	Madu Sihina	
1990	712	Christhu Charithaya	Caiaphas
1991	723	Obata Pamanay Adare	
1992	744	Jaya Sri We Kumariye	
1992	762	Suranimala	
1992	764	Muwan Palasse Kadira	
1993	773	Sagara Thilina	
1993	779	Chaya Maya	
1993	774	Prathingya	
1993	776	Sasara Sarisarana Thek Oba Mage	
1993	777	Mawila Penewi Roope	
1993	780	Come O' Go Chicago	Mr. Wickremasinghe
1993	781	Yasasa	
1994	798	Nohadan Kumariyo	
1994	813	Aathma	
1994	814	Sudu Piruwata	
1997	881	Apaye Thappara 84000k	
2002	975	Sansara Prarthana	
2015	1239	My Name Is Bandu	Sinhabahu

== As a director ==
De Silva was primarily a director of comedy films, which made him one of Sri Lanka's promising directors in Sri Lanka cinema industry. His first direction was of the 1977 film Tom Pachaya, co-directed with Stanley Perera. Up to 2016, he directed 33 films, with more than 70 percent of the films easily passing 100 days and becoming blockbuster hits. De Silva's first English film direction was It's a Matter of Time in 1991.

Year	No.	Film	Role
1977	379	Tom Pachaya	Chaminda Edward
1982	507	Thana Girawi	
1982	531	Mihidum Sihina	Sinna
1982	541	Kadawunu Poronduwa	remake
1983	547	Sumithuro	
1984	588	Hitha Honda Kollek	
1987	657	Thaathi Man Adarei	
1987	674	Gedara Budun Amma	Samantha
1990	710	Madhu Sihina	Sinna
1990	714	Hitha Honda Puthek	
1991		It's a Matter of Time	
1991	734	Cheriyo Doctor	
1992	758	Okkoma Kanapita	
1993	778	Soorayan Athara Veeraya	
1993	783	Jeevan Malli	
1994	815	Love 94	Baby's Father
1995	822	Vijay Saha Ajay	
1995	839	Cheriyo Captain	
1996	863	Cheriyo Darling	
1997	875	Ramba Saha Madu	
1998	894	Re Daniel Dawal Migel 1	Detective Cobra
2000	932	Re Daniel Dawal Migel 2	Detective Cobra
2000	944	Pem Kekula	
2001	959	Jonsun and Gonsun	Station Master
2002	991	Love 2002	
2003	1006	Sepata Dukata Sunny	
2004	1026	Clean Out	
2004	1034	Selamuthu Pinna	
2004	1034	Re Daniel Dawal Migel 3	
2006	1075	Sonduru Wasanthe	Jayawardena
2007	1083	Mr Dana Rina	
2009	1122	Sir Last Chance	
2011		It’s a Matter of Love	
