= List of Sri Lankan films of the 2010s =

This is a list of films produced in Sri Lanka in the 2010s.

== 2010 ==
Title	Director	Cast	Genre	Notes
2010
Sudu Hansi	Mohamad Shaffraz	Semini Iddamalgoda, Arjuna Kamalanath, Ameesha Kavindi, Muthu Tharanga, Neil Alles	Family	Released on 8 January
Uththara	Sandun Rajakaruna	Sanath Gunathilake, Suraj Mapa, Hashini Gonagala, Sahan Ranwala, Upeksha Swarnamali, Janith Wickramage	Family	Released on 4 February
Hadawatha Mal Yayai	Ananda Wickramasinghe	Channa Perera, Chathurika Peiris, Tennison Cooray, Sanath Gunathilake, Mahinda Pathirage, Rathna Sumanapala	Romance	Released on 4 March
Mago Digo Dai	Sri Lal Priyadeva	Vijaya Nandasiri, Anarkalli Aakarsha, Sanath Gunathilake, Sanjula Diwarathna, Gamini Susiriwardana, Anton Jude, Ronnie Leitch	Comedy	Released on April 16
Kshema Bhoomi	Vijaya Darma Sri	Jackson Anthony, Sriyantha Mendis, Asoka Peiris, Yashoda Wimaladharma, Palitha Silva, Vijaya Nandasiri, Jagath Chamila, G.R Perera	Drama	Released on 16 April
Dakina Dakina Mal	V. Siwadasan	Roshan Pilapitiya, Roger Seneviratne, Semini Iddamalgoda, Damitha Abeyratne, Udeni Alwis, Nilanthi Dias, Sahan Wijesinghe	Drama	Released on 23 April
Suwanda Denuna Jeewithe	Dhammika Siriwardana	Roshan Ranawana, Pooja Umashankar, Ishan Gammudali, Himali Siriwardena, Gayathri Dias, Maureen Charuni, Pubudu Chathuranga, Ramani Siriwardana	Family	Released on 11 June
Jaya Pita Jaya	Sunil Soma Peiris	Arjuna Kamalanath, Ameesha Kavindi, Rex Kodippili, Susila Kottage, Susantha Chandramali, Janesh Silva, Chathura Perera	Drama	Released on 18 June
Sthuthi Nawatha Enna	Sumith Rohana Thiththawelgala	Hemasiri Liyanage, Damitha Abeyratne, Bimal Jayakody, Jagath Benaragama, Jayani Senanayake	Family	Released on 24 June
Bambara Walalla	Athula Liyanage	Athula Liyanage, Damitha Abeyratne, Dasun Madushanka, Nita Fernando, Mahendra Perera, Bimal Jayakody, Sarath Kothalawala, Jayalath Manoratne	Drama	Released on 6 August
Ape Yalu Punchi Boothaya	Sri Lal Priyadeva	Ananda Wickramage, Tennison Cooray, Bandu Samarasinghe, Danushka Iroshini, D.B. Gangodathenna	Children's	Released on 11 August
Ira Handa Yata	Benet Rathnayaka	Dharshani Tasha, Udara Ratnayake, Sheril Decker, Kevin Nugera, Veena Jayakody, Chandani Seneviratne, Nadaraja Sivam	War	Released on 2 September
Sara	Pradeep Nishantha	Sujani Menaka, Pubudu Chathuranga, Maureen Charuni, Asanga Perera, Asela Jayakody	Drama	Released on 23 October
Suba	Ariyadasa Peiris	Manjula Moragaha, Muthu Tharanga	Family	Released on 5 November
Tikiri Suwanda	Sunil Aruna Weerasiri	Jayalal Rohana, Joe Abeywickrama, Anula Karunathilaka, Duleeka Marapana, Rodney Warnakula, Sarath Kothalawala	Drama	Released on 10 October
Viyapath Bambara	Gayan Ranadheera	Rupun Ranadheera, Anura Dharmasiriwardena, Uthpala Gunatileke	Drama	Released on 3 December
Vidhu	Asoka Handagama	Saumya Liyanage, Chandani Seneviratne, Gamini Hettiarachchi	Drama	Released on 10 December

== 2011 ==
Title	Director	Cast	Genre	Notes
2011
Sinhawalokanaya	Suneth Malinga Lokuhewa	Delon Jayasinghe, Raini Charuka Gunathilaka, Menaka Rajapakse, Tillakaratne Dilshan, Ashen Manjula, Jayalal Rohana, Dilhani Ekanayake, Kusum Renu, Kumara Thirimadura	History, Sports	Released on 14 January
Dawala Pawura	Luxman Arachchige	Luxman Arachchige, Sunil Saliya Ranaweera, Clarice De Silva, Sandun Wijesiri, Hyasinth Wijeratne	Adult, Drama	Released on 21 January
Pitasakwala Abirahasa	Nirmal Rajapaksha	Lasantha Kamalsiri, Shamila Vijini, Vimukthi Udara, Maduri Poornima, Arosha Kanchana	Science fiction, fantasy	Released on February
Nidi Yahana Kelabei	Sudesh Wasantha Peiris	Robin Fernando, Nadeeka Gunasekara, Rex Kodippili, Sandun Wijesiri, Nishani Gamage	Adult, Drama	Released on 4 March
Flying Fish (Igillena Maluwo)	Sanjeewa Pushpakumara	Kaushalya Fernando, Rathnayaka Marasinghe, Sampath Jayaweera, Gayesha Perera, Siththi Mariyam, Sanjeewa Dissanayake, Sumathy Sivamohan, Nilanka Dahanayake	Drama.	The film was banned in Sri Lankan theaters. But it gained worldwide attraction and was nominated for several categories in film festivals.
Challenges	Udayakantha Warnasuriya	Pubudu Chathuranga, Sheshadri Priyasad, Roshan Ranawana, Lucky Dias, Vasanthi Chathurani, Sangeetha Weeraratne	Romantic comedy	Released on March 11
Angara Dangara	Nalin Rajapaksha	Shanudrie Priyasad, Roger Seneviratne, Nadeeka Gunasekara, Sachini Ayendra, Nilmini Kottegoda, Susila Kottage, Kumara Thirimadura	Comedy, Drama	Released on 1 April
Muthu Salamba	Kusum Chandra Gamage	Lal Weerasinghe, Anusha Damayanthi, Udith Abeyratne, Chanchala Warnasooriya, Nalin Pradeep Udawela, Dilani Madurasinghe, Jeevan Handunnetti	Adult, Drama	Released on 28 April
Mahindagamanaya	Sanath Abeysekara	Jeevan Kumaratunga, Dilhani Ekanayake, Roshan Ranawana, Joe Abeywickrama, Udayanthi Kulatunga, Roshan Pilapitiya, Menaka Rajapakse, Kumara Thirimadura	History, Biography	Released on May 18
King Hunther	Jayaprakash Sivagurunathan	Vijaya Nandasiri, Mahendra Perera, Anarkali Akarsha, Giriraj Kaushalya, Kumara Thirimadura, Semini Iddamalgoda, Sanath Gunathilake	Comedy, Fantasy	Released on 27 May
Sweet Angel	Eranga Senaratne	Deepa Chandi, Chillie Thilanka, Wasantha Kumaravila, Susan Fernando, Manel Wanaguru, Ananda Wickramage, Nilmini Kottegoda, Sarath Kulanga	Drama	Released on 8 July
Gamani	Rear Admiral Sarath Weerasekara	W. Jayasiri, Dilhani Ekanayake, Bimal Jayakody, Sanath Gunathilake, Suminda Sirisena, Veena Jayakody, Damitha Abeyratne, Sarath Kothalawala, Jayani Senanayake, Jagath Chamila, Jagath Benaragama, Asela Jayakody, Darshan Dharmaraj	War, Comedy, Action	The film was critically acclaimed by many critics. It also features one of the longest film cast over 30 popular actors and actresses in Sri Lanka. It is the highest-grossing film of year 2011 and won many awards in all local award ceremonies.
Suseema	Rohan Welivita	Paboda Sandeepani, Suraj Mapa, Saranga Disasekara, Robin Fernando, Upeksha Swarnamali, Amila Abeysekara, Robin Fernando	Musical, Drama	Released on 26 August
Kiwwada Nahi Nokiwwada Nahi	Lal Priyadeva	Ranjan Ramanayake, Menaka Pieris, Tennyson Cooray, Arjuna Kamalanath, Chanchala Warnasooriya, Eardley Wedamuni, Rex Kodippili, Teddy Vidyalankara	Comedy	Released on September 5
Dheewari	Salinda Perera	Joe Abeywickrema, Sangeetha Weeraratne, Cyril Wickremage, Trilicia Gunawardena, Jackson Anthony, Veena Jayakody	Adult, Drama	Released on 30 September
Putha Mage Suraya	Ranjith Jayasinghe	Shashi Wijendra, Anusha Sonali, Veena Jayakody, Cletus Mendis	Action	Released on 28 October
Ethumai Methumai	Nishantha Weerasinghe	Priyantha Seneviratne, Rodney Warnakula, Anarkalli Aakarsha, Duleeka Marapana, Ananda Wickramage, Anton Jude, Mahinda Pathirage, Susila Kottage, Ronnie Leitch	Adult, Drama	Released on November 15
Selvam	Sanjaya Leelarathna	Joe Abeywickrama, Malini Fonseka, Jayani Senanayake, Shalani Tharaka, Chandika Nanayakkara, N. Puvanalogany, Nadaraja Sivam	Drama	The film awarded for the best Asian film for the year 2011 and the award for the Best Upcoming Director at Kuala Lumpur Film Festival.
Thank You Berty	Tennyson Cooray	Bandu Samarasinghe, Tennyson Cooray, Nilanthi Dias, Dilhani Ekanayake, Ananda Wickramage, Ronnie Leitch, Kumari Senarathna, Mahendra Perera	Comedy	Released on November 25
Angam (Documentary Film)	Rasanga Weerasinghe		Documentary	

== 2012 ==
Title	Director	Cast	Genre	Notes
2012
Sakvithi Dadayama	Sumith Galhena	Vijaya Nandasiri, Arjuna Kamalanath, Anusha Damayanthi, Rex Kodippili, Susila Kottage	Comedy	Released on January 12
Matha	Boodee Keerthisena	Darshan Dharmaraj, Yasodha Radhakrishnan, Dharmapriya Dias, Thumindu Dodantenna, Raja Ganeshan, Buddhika Jayarathne, Vimukthi Jayasundara, Mahendra Perera, Ravindra Randeniya	War	Released on January 20
Kusa Pabha	Sunil Ariyaratne	Jackson Anthony, Pooja Umashankar, Ravindra Randeniya, Roshan Ranawana, Veena Jayakody, Chandani Seneviratne, Kusum Renu, Palitha Silva, Mahinda Pathirage, Mahendra Perera	History, Biography	Won SIGNIS Awards for Most Creative Supporting Actress - Chandani Seneviratne, Derana Film Awards for Best Supporting Actress - Veena Jayakody
Wassane Senehasa	Densil Jayaweera	Chandika Nanayakkara, Umayangana Wickramasinghe, Wijeratne Warakagoda, Janak Premalal, Rodney Warnakula, Veena Jayakody, Mihira Sirithilaka	Romance	Released on 9 March
Kurumittek Awilla	A.A. Junaideen	Chandana Edirisinhe, Cletus Mendis, Veena Jayakody, Richard Weerakkody, Nuwangi Liyanage, Rajasinha Loluwagoda	Children's, Science fiction	Released on March 30
Vijaya Kuweni	Sugath Samarakoon	Roger Seneviratne, Dulani Anuradha, Ravindra Randeniya, Sriyantha Mendis, Buddhadasa Vithanarachchi, Duleeka Marapana, Wasantha Dukgannarala	History, Biography	Released on May 6
Super Six	Udara Palliyaguruge	Saranga Disasekara, Roshan Ranawana, Hemal Ranasinghe, Paboda Sandeepani, Aruni Rajapaksha, Maleeka Sirisenage, Suneth Chithrananda	Drama, Action	Released on 17 May
Sihinaya Dige Enna	Chandrarathna Mapitigama	Amila Abeysekara, Udari Warnakulasooriya, Sanath Gunathilake, Veena Jayakody, Rajitha Hiran, Manel Wanaguru, Bandula Wijeweera, Nayana Kumari	Romance	Released on July 20
Daruwane	V.Siwadasan	Jayalath Manoratne, Duleeka Marapana, Nadeeka Gunasekara, Janaka Kumbukage, Palitha Silva, Vishwa Kodikara, Thisuri Yuwanika	Family, Drama	Released on July 26
Colour	Isuru Weerasingha	Kamal Addararachchi, Sadani Sulakna, Udayanthi Kulathunga, Jayani Senanayake, Janaki Wijerathne, Anjela Senevirathne	Drama, Art	Released on 24 August
Senasuru Maruwa	Udayakantha Warnasuriya	Channa Perera, Sheshadri Priyasad, Buddhika Jayarathne, Lucky Dias, Nadeeka Gunasekara, Indika Ginige	Drama	Released on October 11
Karma	Prasanna Jayakody	Jagath Manuwarna, Michelle Herft, Nadeeka Guruge, Avanthi Dilrukshika, Nadeesha Yapage, Lelum Rathnayake, Priyantha Rathnayake	Adult, Drama	Released on 12 October. The film awarded many local and overseas academics for the best film and best actress categories.
Prathiroo	Kapila Sooriyaarachchi	Malani Fonseka, Jagath Benaragama, Joe Abeywickrama, Sriyantha Mendis, Palitha Silva, Jagath Chamila, Himali Sayurangi, Veena Jayakody, Giriraj Kaushalya, Wijeratne Warakagoda, Damayanthi Fonseka, Sujeewa Priyalal	War, Drama	Released on November 23
Mouse	Wasantha Moragoda	Kaushalya Fernando, Wasantha Moragoda, Robin Fernando, Roshan Ravindra, Srimal Wedisinghe, Awanthi Aponso, Jayani Senanayake	Children's	Released on December 14
Ini Avan	Asoka Handagama	Darshan Dharmaraj, Subashini Balasubramaniyam, Niranjani Shanmugaraja, Raja Ganeshan, Malcolm Machado, King Rathnam	War	Released on December 21
Jeevithe Lassanai	Sudesh Wasantha Peiris	Ranjan Ramanayake, Menaka Maduwanthi, Maheshi Madushanka, Ruwangi Rathnayaka, Anton Jude, Tennyson Cooray, Ananda Wickramage, Wilson Gunaratne, Chathura Perera	Comedy	Released on December 21

== 2013 ==
Title	Director	Cast	Genre	Notes
2013
Sri Siddhartha Gautama	Saman Weeraman	Anshu Malik, Gagan Malik, Anchal Singh, Ranjan Ramanayake, Roshan Ranawana, Saranga Disasekara, Sanjula Diwarathna, Kumari Senarathna,	Documentary	Released on January 24
Bomba Saha Rosa	Anuruddha Jayasinghe	Vishwa Kodikara, Upeksha Swarnamali, Bimal Jayakody, Mahendra Perera, Darshan Dharmaraj, Kumara Thirimadura, Sarath Kothalawala	Drama, Thriller	Released on February 14
Anithya	Nalaka Vithanage	Menik Wijewardhana, Vishwa Lanka, Roger Seneviratne, Sangeetha Weeraratne	18+, Drama	Released on 22 March
Kauda Machan Alice	Lesli Siriwardana	Wimal Kumara de Costa, Ronnie Leitch, Harshani Perera, Wilson Gunaratne, Samanthi Lenarol	Comedy	Released on 29 March
Abhinikmana	Hector Kumarasiri	Sudarshana Bandara, Joe Abeywickrama, Iranganie Serasinghe, W. Jayasiri, Mahendra Perera, Lochana Imashi	Drama, Philosophical	Released on 19 April
Peeter One	Bandu Samarasinghe	Bandu Samarasinghe, Nilanthi Dias, Rodney Warnakula, Sarath Kulanga, Kumara Samarasinghe, Lakshman Mendis, Veena Jayakody	Comedy	Released on 11 May
Siri Parakum	Somaratne Dissanayake	Akhila Dhanuddhara, Chandani Seneviratne, Giriraj Kaushalya, Palitha Silva, Pramuditha Udaya Kumara, Sachini Ayendra, Senali Fonseka	History	Released on 30 May
Nikini Vassa	Aruna Jayawardana	Chandani Seneviratne, Thumindu Dodantenna, Bimal Jayakody, Jagath Manuwarna	Drama	Released on 7 June. Won Jury's Special Mention of the Best Actress Award at Dubai International Film Festival, Lanka Live Award for Best Actress, Hiru Golden Film Award for Best Actress, SIGNIS Award for Creative Performance (Female): Silver Award - Chandani Seneviratne
Igillenna Ai Dagalanne	Arjuna Kamalanath	Arjuna Kamalanath, Ameesha Kavindi, Sapna Kareem, Sudath Wijesekara, Chami Senanayake, Rashmi Pushpika, Marian Elizabeth	18+, Drama	Released on 18 July
Ira Laga Wadi	Chandrarathne Mapitigama	Sanath Gunathilake, Dilhani Ekanayake, Sanath Wimalasiri, Wijeratne Warakagoda, Rajitha Hiran	Adult, Drama	Released on August 16
Ran Kevita 2	Udayakantha Warnasuriya	Harith Samarasinghe, Hisham Samsudeen, Susantha Chandramali, Don Gai, Asela Jayakody, Damitha Saluwadana, Suneth Chithrananda	Children's	Released on August 23
Seetha Man Awa	Jayasekara Aponso	Jayasekara Aponso, Bandu Samarasinghe, Sanoja Bibile, Rodney Warnakula, Chanchala Warnasooriya, Kumara Thirimadura, Bandula Wijeweera	Comedy	Released on September 13
Samanala Sandhawaniya	Jayantha Chandrasiri	Uddika Premarathna, Yashoda Wimaladharma, Pubudu Chathuranga, Soorya Dayaruwan, Wilson Gunaratne, Buddhadasa Vithanarachchi, Roger Seneviratne	Romance, Drama	Released on October 4
Double Trouble	Dinesh Priyasad	Shiwanka Weddikkara, Sheshadri Priyasad, Dinakshie Priyasad, Wilson Gunaratne	Comedy	Released on October 24
Raja Horu	Suranga De Alwis	Ranjan Ramanayake, Arjuna Kamalanath, Ariyasena Gamage, Buddhika Jayarathna, Himali Siriwardena	Action, Comedy	Released on November 22
Doni	V. Siwadasan	Kamal Addararachchi, Sangeetha Weeraratne, Sanath Gunathilake, Rangana Premaratne, Ananda Wickramage	Drama	Released on December 19

== 2014 ==
Title	Director	Cast	Genre	Notes
2014
Parawarthana	Jayanath Gunawardana	Dulani Anuradha, Somy Rathnayake, Pubudu Chathuranga, Geetha Kanthi Jayakody, Bimal Jayakody	18+, Drama	Released on January 19
Rupantharana	Nalaka Vithanage	Amila Karunanayake, Ranjan Ramanayake, Ravindra Randeniya, Shaila Nathaniel, Tissa Wijesurendra, Damitha Abeyratne	Action, War, Thriller	Released on February 15
Samige Kathawa	Priyankara Vittanchchi	Jagath Chamila, Nilmini Buwaneka, Sanath Gunathilake, Menik Kurukulasuriya, Kusum Perera, Thesara Jayawardane	Drama, Comedy	Worldwide release in 2011, but released in Sri Lanka in 2014. Chamila was awarded the best actor's award at the New York City International Film Festival for his role in the film.
Siri Daladagamanaya	Sanath Abeysekara	Ravindra Randeniya, Heshan Manula, Dilhani Ekanayake, Madhumadhawa Aravinda, Sureni Ayangika, Jeewan Kumaranatunga, Geetha Kumarasinghe	Epic, History, Thriller	Released on March 7
WarigaPojja - The Clan	Thushara Thennakoon	Jagath Manuwarna, Nadeeshani Nilukshi, Nayana Hettiarachchi, Somaweera Gamage, Poopalasingham Pradeepan	Adventure, Drama	Released on March 21
Supiri Andare	Mitchell Fonseka	Tennyson Cooray, Lakshika Jayawardena, Rodney Warnakula, Sanoja Bibile, Tissa Wijesurendra	Comedy	Released on April 17
Kosthapal Punyasoma	Udayakantha Warnasuriya	Mahendra Perera, Duleeka Marapana, Gamini Hettiarachchi, Chathura Perera, Ronnie Leitch, Menik Wijewardena	Comedy	Released on May 2
Ranja	Sudesh Wasantha Pieris	Ranjan Ramanayake, Himali Siriwardena, Wasantha Kumaravila, Srimal Wedisinghe, Piyumi Botheju, Rex Kodippili	Action, Thriller	Released on May 28
Rassa Kale	Siri Kularathna	Sanath Gunathilake, Nita Fernando, Malintha Wijewardena, Trishuna Perera, Ravindu Sathsarana, Piyumi Sankalani, Quintus Weerakoon	Children's	Released on 31 July
Ahelepola Kumarihami	Sugath Samarakoon	Jackson Anthony, Buddhadasa Vithanarachchi, Dulani Anuradha, Sriyantha Mendis, Lucky Dias, Cletus Mendis, Vishaka Siriwardana	Epic, History	Released on 1 August
Parapura	Cletus Mendis	Ranjan Ramanayake, Kanchana Mendis, Jeewan Kumaranatunga, Maureen Charuni, Buddhadasa Vithanarachchi	Drama	Released on August 8
Anagarika Dharmapala Srimathano	Sanath Abeysekara	Palitha Silva, Hyasinth Wijeratne, Lucky Dias, Sriyantha Mendis, G.R Perera	Biographical, History	Released on September 5
Que Sera	Parakrama Jayasinghe	Srimal Wedisingha, Oshini Perera, Michelle Herft, Dilhani Ekanayake	Drama	Released on September 19
Thanha Rathi Ranga	Nilendra Deshpriya	Kumara Thirimadura, Sarath Kothalawala, Namal Jayasinghe, Sulochana Weerasinghe, Swarna Mallawarachchi, Anoja Weerasinghe, Nita Fernando, Kamal Addararachchi	Drama, Thriller	Released on October 17. The film awarded best film, best script, best actor and many more awards at Derana Film Awards 2014.
Sathiyakata Mata Rata Baradenda	Somarathna Ramanayaka	Kumari Dandeniya, Sudeera Rathnayaka, Rohana Samansiri, Richard Weerakkodi, Joe Livera, Wijeratne Warakagoda	Comedy	Released on October 31
Kalpanthe Sihinayak	Channa Perera	Channa Perera, Chaithra Chandranth, Sanath Gunathilake, Iranganie Serasinghe, Nihal Fernando	Mystery, Romance, Fantasy	Released on November 7
Duwana Muwan	Indra Weerasekara	Uddika Premarathna, Pabhasara Diddeniya, Ferny Roshini, Nilmini Kottegoda, Nissanka Diddeniya, Maureen Charuni, Peter Gunasekara, Kaushalya Nirmana	Children's	Released on 27 November
Ko Mark No Mark	Jayaprakash Sivagurunadan	Vijaya Nandasiri, Dilhani Ekanayake, Giriraj Kaushalya, Mihira Sirithilaka, Semini Iddamalgoda, Gihan Fernando, Kumara Thirimadura, Palitha Perera	Comedy, Political	Released on December 12
Api Marenne Na	Mohan Niyaz	Lucky Dias, Palitha Silva, Semini Iddamalgoda, Kumara Thirimadura, Sarath Kothalawala, Anton Jude	Comedy	Released on December 19

== 2015 ==
Title	Director	Cast	Genre	Notes
2015
Bonikka	Luvi Vanderstraaten	Malinda Perera, Gayesha Perera, Sanju Samarasinghe, Shalika Edirisinghe, Anoja Weerasinghe, Rashmi Pushpika Sumanasekara	Drama, Romance	Released on 16 January
Mage Yalu Malu	Lal Priyadewa, Sudesh Wasantha Peris	Chandani Seneviratne, Sarath Chandrasiri, Chillie Thilanka, Jeevan Handunnetti	Children's	Released on 22 January
Maharaja Gemunu	Jayantha Chandrasiri	Jackson Anthony, Uddika Premarathna, Yashoda Wimaladharma, Kusum Renu	Historical, Biographical	Released on 23 January
Bora Diya Pokuna	Sathyajith Maitipe	Kaushalya Fernando, Duminda De Silva, Dharmasiri Bandaranayake, Dilani Abeywardana, Chandani Seneviratne	Adult, Drama	Released on 14 February. Kaushalya Fernando won award for the best actress at Derana Film Awards 2015.
Spandana	Suneth Malinga Lokuhewa	Roshan Ranawana, Shalani Tharaka, Dilhani Ekanayake, Mahendra Perera, Darshan Dharmaraj, Nimanthi Porage	Horror	Released on 18 March
Sanjana	Hemasiri Sellapperuma	Anarkali Akarsha, Manjula Kumari, Sameera Randeniya, Wilson Karunaratne, Sanka Peiris, Kusum Renu, Anusha Damayanthi	Drama, Romance	Released on 20 March
Gindari (Bahubuthayo 2)	Udayakantha Warnasuriya	Paboda Sandeepani, Mahendra Perera, Rodney Warnakula, Richerd Manamudali, Sriyantha Mendis, Lochana Imashi, Ravindra Yasas	Comedy, Horror	Released on 24 April
Sinahawa Atharin	Sanath Gunathilake	Semini Iddamalgoda, Sanath Gunathilake, Chris Henri, Jayani Senanayake, Alfred Perera, Chandrika Perera, Wimal Jayaweera, Gamini Rajanayake	Drama, Romance	Released on 30 April
Mangala Gamana	Nandana Hewapanna	Chami Senanayake, Shenali Perera, Nissanka Udayakumar, Gayan Mapalagama, Rohitha Samaraweera, Gamini Costa	Drama	The film awarded special recognition award at Canada International Film Festival, Vancouver, Canada (2015). This film has been released only in one theater for one screening on purpose of a Guinness World Record.
Pravegaya	Donald Jayantha, P. Sarov	Hemal Ranasinghe, |Jackson Anthony, Mahendra Perera, Udari Perera, Jayalath Manoratne, Gajan Ganesshan	Action, Masala	Hemal won the award for the most popular actor and special jury award at Derana film awards 2015.
Ira Sewaya	Rodney Widanapathirana	Wimal Alahakone, Rebeka Nirmali, Maureen Charuni, Ishara Amerasinghe, Stanley Krisharathna	Drama	Released on 19 June
None Mage Sudu None	Eranga Senarathna	Wilson Gunaratne, Anusha Damayanthi, Mihira Sirithilaka, Mahinda Pathirage, Sanjula Diwarathne, Sanju Rodrigo	Comedy	Released on 17 July
Me Wage Adarayak	Chandran Rutnam	Dinakshie Priyasad, Anuj Ranasinghe, Heshan Don	Romance	Released on 24 July
Anatha Dupatha	Somaratna Malimbada, Nandana Wijeyakumara	Malshi Nimasha, Pubudu Gamage, Chamara Priyadarshana	Mystery	Released on 5 August
Maharaja Ajasath	Sanath Abeysekara	Jeewan Kumaranatunga, Sabeetha Perera, Gayan Wikramathilake, Hashini Gonagala, Palitha Silva, Roshan Ranawana	Historic, Biography	Released on 21 August
Aathma Warusha	Kusum Chandra Gamage	Lal Weersinghe, Anusha Damayanthi, Robin Fernando, Cletus Mendis, Vishaka Siriwardana, Miyuri Samarasinghe	Drama, Thriller	Released on 27 August
Oba Nathuwa Oba Ekka	Prasanna Vithanage	Shyam Fernando, Anjali Patil, Maheshwari Ratnam, Wasantha Moragoda	Post war, Drama	Released on 12 July
Lantin Singho	Aruna Mahendra	Ananda Wickramage, Wimal Kumara de Costa, Kumara Thirimadura, Dilhani Ekanayake, Sanoja Bibile, Duleeka Marapana, Giriraj Kaushalya	Comedy	Released 25 September
Suhada Koka	Giriraj Kawshalya	Vijaya Nandasiri, Kusum Renu, Rodney Warnakula, Sathischandra Edirisinghe, W. Jayasiri, Mihira Sirithilaka	Political, Comedy	Released on 23 October
Address Na	Jackson Anthony	Jackson Anthony, Kamal Addararachchi, Mahendra Perera, Sabeetha Perera, Bimal Jayakody, Roshan Ravindra, Hemal Ranasinghe, Aruni Rajapaksha	Drama, Thriller	Released on 23 October
My Name Is Bandu	Suranga de Alwis	Bandu Samarasinghe, Rodney Warnakula, Anusha Damayanthi, Roy de Silva, Mark Samson, Premasiri Liyanage	Comedy	Released on 30 October
Ho Gaana Pokuna	Indika Fernando	Lucien Bulathsinhala, Jayalath Manoratne, Anasuya Subasinghe, Dayadewa Edirisinghe, Jayani Senanayake, Hyacinth Wijeratne, Senat Dikkumbura, Geetha Kanthi Jayakody	Children's	Released on 11 December. The film won awards for the best director, best blockbuster movie of the year 2015 and best film song at Derana film awards 2015.
Singa Machan Charlie	Lal Weerasinghe	Lal Weerasinghe, Tennyson Cooray, Suraj Mapa, Udayanthi Kulathunga, Vishaka Siriwardana	Action, Thriller	Released on 30 December
An Imperfection	Rasanga Weerasinghe	Erin Keller, Jaylee Hamidi	Drama, Thriller	Released on 29 September

== 2016 ==
Title	Director	Cast	Genre	Notes
2016
Cindrella	Inoka Sathyangani	Akalanka Ganegama, Upeksha Swarnamali, Pubudu Chathuranga, Indrachapa Liyanage	Romance	Released on February 5
Patibhana	P. A. Rabin Chandrasiri	Sampath Sri Jayasinghe, Niroshan Wijesinghe, Chandrasoma Binduhewa, Shanika Bandara, Samson Siripala	Drama, Religious	Released on February 19. The film won the Best Director award at SAARC Film Festival 2015
Natannethuwa Dinna	Kalyana Chandrasekera	Bindu Bothalegama, Madi Panditharathne, Rodney Warnakula, Ronnie Leitch, Milinda Perera	Comedy	Released on March 11
Weerawarna	Thushara Ranasinghe	Ravindra Randeniya, Cyril Wickramage, W. Jayasiri, Douglas Ranasinghe, Veena Jayakody, Gamini Jayalath	Drama, Mystery	Released on March 18
Sinhaya	V. Sivadasan	Ranjan Ramanayake, Duleeka Marapana, Maheshi Madushanka, Palitha Silva, Ananda Wickramage, Mihira Sirithilaka, Anura Waragoda, Gayathri Dias, Sanath Gunathilake, Nadeeka Gunasekara	Action, Thriller, Fantasy	Released on March 30
July 7	Sanjaya Nirmal	Anarkali Akarsha, Saranga Disasekara, Pubudu Chathuranga, Damitha Abeyratne, Oshadi Hewamadduma, Charith Abeysinghe	Comedy, Drama	
Sakkarang	Dharmasena Pathiraja	Bimal Jayakody, Prasadini Athapaththu, Pubudu Chathuranga, Cyril Wickramage, Chamila Peiris, Gayan Wickramathilake	History	
Paththini	Sunil Ariyarathna	Pooja Umashankar, Uddika Premarathna, Aruni Rajapaksha, Ravindra Randeniya, Lucky Dias, Veena Jayakody	Epic, History	Released on May 5
Let Her Cry	Asoka Handagama	Swarna Mallawarachchi, Dritimen Chaterji, Sandali Ash, Rithika Kodithuvakku	Drama, Romance	Released on May 13
Hora Police	Suranga De Alwis	Mahendra Perera, Gangu Roshana, Priyantha Seneviratne, Rithika Kodithuvakku	Comedy	Released on June 6
Adaraneeya Kathawak	Priyantha Colombage	Hemal Ranasinghe, Udari Warnakulasooriya, Bimal Jayakody, Aruni Rajapaksha	Musical, Romance	Released on June 10
Puthandiya	Thisula Deepa Thmbavita	Himali Siriwardena, Jeewan Kumaranatunga, Buddhika Jayarathna, Nehara Pieris, Dharmapriya Dias, Kumara Thirimadura	Action, Romance	Released on July 22
Ulath Ekai Pilath Ekai	Harsha Udakanda	Roshan Ranawana, Rajitha Hiran, Darshan Dharmaraj, Mihira Sirithilaka, Damitha Abeyratne, Kamal Deshapriya	Action, Masala, Comedy	Released on August 25
Motor Bicycle	Shameera Rangana Naotunna	Dasun Pathirana, Samanalee Fonseka, Veena Jayakody, Mahendra Perera, Kumara Thirimadura	Romance, Action	Released on August 26. The Film won The Best Film award at the SAARC film festival 2015
Maya	Donald Jayantha	Ranjan Ramanayake, Pubudu Chathuranga, Upeksha Swarnamali, Nilmini Kottegoda, Ishan Gammudali	Horror, Comedy, Action	Released on September 1. The Film is a remake of Kollywood film Muni 2: Kanchana.
Sujatha Puthra	Sri Pali Hettiarachchi	Nayana Kumari, Pramuditha Udayakumara, Harshi Rasanga, Mihira Sirithilaka, Ravindra Randeniya, Nirosha Thalagala	Children's	Released on October 3.
The Rainbow	Nalin Rajapaksa	Roshan Ranawana, Tanasha Hatharasinghe, Rex Kodippili, Kumara Thirimadura, Wasantha Kumaravila	Action, Romance	Released on October 20.
Sayapethi Kusuma	Visakesa Chandrasekaram	Jehan Sri Kanth, Dasun Pathirana, Yasodha Rasanduni, Bhoomi Harendran, Ruwan Malith, Kumudu Kumarasinghe	Drama, Romance	Released on October 20.
Silence in the Courts	Prasanna Vithanage	Thilakshini Ratnayake, Vibhishana Kurera, Chula Mendis, Chinthaka Vas, Anton Kurera	Documentary	Released on October 22. The film runs through narration.
Raja Mamai	Kalyana Chandrasekera	Bindu Botalegama, Premadasa Vithanage, Chathura Perera, Dayasiri Hettiarachchi	Comedy	Released on October 28.
Hero Nero	Pradeep Mahesh Liyanage	Sangeetha Weeraratne, Duleeka Marapana, Mahinda Pathirage, Nilmini Tennakoon, Niroshan Wijesinghe	Children's	Released on November 11.
64 Mayam	Sudesh Wasantha Peiris	Vijaya Nandasiri, Mahinda Pathirage, Vishwa Lanka, Nirosha Thalagala, Susila Kottage	Comedy	Released on November 16 as posthumous release after death of Vijaya Nandasiri.
Sarigama	Somaratne Dissanayake	Pooja Umashankar, Malini Fonseka, Ashan Dias, Rathna Lalani Jayakody, Gayani Gisanthika	Musical drama	Released on December 2.
Ape Kaalaye Patachara	Sugath Samarakoon	Dulani Anuradha, Ravindra Randeniya, Saranga Disasekara, Anura Dharmasiriwardena, Sarath Dikkumbura	Historical drama	Released on December 10.
Zoom	Sameera Wackwella	Hemal Ranasinghe, Sheshadri Priyasad, Dinakshie Priyasad, Jeewan Kumaranatunga, Jayalath Manoratne	Horror, Romantic	Released on December 16. This is the first 3D film make in Sri Lanka.
Eidetic	Akash Sk	Stefania Perera, Kalhari Edirisinghe, Akash Sk, Dilshan Fonseka	Action thriller short	Released online on December 16.

== 2017 ==
Title	Director	Cast	Genre	Notes
2017
Aloko Udapadi	Chathra Weeraman	Uddika Premarathna, Dilhani Ekanayake, Roshan Ravindra, Buddhadasa Vithanarachchi, Darshan Dharmaraj	Epic history, Biography	Released on January 20.
Ran Sayura	Sudesh Wasantha Pieris	Wasantha Kumaravila, Roger Seneviratne, Himali Siriwardena, Susila Kottage, Ruwangi Rathnayake, Mahinda Pathirage, Wishwa Lanka	Drama, action	Released on February 16.
Premaya Nam	Kalpana Ariyawansha; Vindana Ariyawansha	Shyam Fernando, Samanalee Fonseka, Suranga Ranawaka, Buddhadasa Vithanarachchi	Drama	Released on February 21.
Sulanga Gini Aran	Vimukthi Jayasundara	Kaushalya Fernando, Mahendra Perera, Bandula Vithanage, Roshan Ravindra	Psychodrama	Released on March 17.
Kota Uda Express	A.A. Junaideen	Tennyson Cooray, Dilhani Ekanayake, Dayasiri Hettiarachchi, Ananda Athukorale	Family masala	Released on March 30.
Bandhanaya	Udayakantha Warnasuriya	Cyril Wickramage, Hemal Ranasinghe, Suvineetha Weerasinghe, Dulani Anuradha, Nilmini Tennakoon	Horror	Released on April 7.
Nilanjana	Nalaka Withanage	Himali Siriwardena, Palitha Silva, Sriyani Amarasena, Anusha Damayanthi	Drama thriller	Released on April 24.
Pani Makuluwo	Isuru Weerasinghe Mudali	Dineth de Silva, Priota Farelin, Aishara Athukorala, Sanath Gunathilake	Cyber crime thriller	Released on April 4.
Ali Kathawa	Sunil Ariyaratne	Kaushalya Fernando, Dananjaya Siriwardana, Ravindra Randeniya, Duleeka Marapana, Rodney Warnakula, Kumara Thirimadura	Children's drama	Released on May 18.
Nimnayaka Hudekalawa	Boodee Keerthisena	Saumya Liyanage, Sangeetha Weeraratne, Ravindra Randeniya, Palitha Silva, Jayalal Rohana, Sachini Ayendra	Drama	Released on May 19.
Nino Live	Thisara Imbulana	Nino Jayakodi, Dasun Pathirana, Yureni Noshika, Umali Thilakarathne, Chandani Seneviratne	Comedy, drama	Released on May 26.
28	Prasanna Jayakody	Mahendra Perera, Semini Iddamalgoda, Sarath Kothalawala, Rukmal Nirosh	Drama feature	Released on June 2.
Hima Tharaka	Rodney Vidanapathirana	Jagath Chamila, Nadee Chandrasekara, Amarasiri Kalansuriya, Maureen Charuni, Manel Wanaguru	Drama	Released on June 20.
Devani Warama	G. Nandasena	Pubudu Chathuranga, Rishi Anjela, Tennyson Cooray, Rex Kodippili, Gayathri Dias	Romantic	Released on June 22.
Dharmayuddhaya	Cheyyar Ravi	Jackson Anthony, Dilhani Ekanayake, Kusum Renu, Roshan Pilapitiya, Kumara Thirimadura, Thisuri Yuwanika	Family drama	Released on July 14.
Punchi Apith Baya Na Dan	Priyantha Pathirage	Mahinda Pathirage, Giriraj Kaushalya, Rajitha Hiran, Susantha Chandramali, Milinda Perera, Samanthi Lanarol	Children's adventure	Released on July 21.
Heena Hoyana Samanallu	Rohan Perera	Dilhani Ekanayake, Saumya Liyanage, Nethalie Nanayakkara, Hemasiri Liyanage, Lucien Bulathsinhala, Umali Thilakarathne	Children's drama	Released on August 11.
Sellam Nethnam Lellam	Tissa Dias	Jayasekara Aponso, Tissa Dias, Wimal Kumara de Costa, Mercy Edirisinghe, Saheli Sadithma, Harry Wimalasena	Comedy thriller	Released on September 6.
Appata Siri	Lal Priyadeva	Mahendra Perera, Bandula Wijeweera, Hyacinth Wijeratne, Inoka Edirisinghe, Chalaka Chamupathi, Sanet Dikkumbura, Don Guy, Teddy Vidyalankara	Comedy	Released on September 22.
Swaroopa	Dharmasena Pathiraja	W. Jayasiri, Nita Fernando, Lakshman Mendis, Wimal Kumara de Costa, Chamila Pieris, D.B. Gangodathenna, Vishwajith Gunasekara	Drama	Released on September 29.
Dedunu Akase	Priyantha Colombage	Hemal Ranasinghe, Chulakshi Ranathunga, Teena Shanel, Jayalath Manoratne, Saheli Sadithma, Dasun Nishan	Romance	Released on October 12.
Kaala	Sujeewa Gunarathne	Mahendra Perera, Madani Malwaththa, W. Jayasiri, Nita Fernando, Jagath Manuwarna, Vishwanath Kodikara	Epic, thriller	Released on October 27.
Seema Na Akase	Nihal Bandara	Pubudu Chathuranga, Aruni Mallawarachchi, Sanjula Diwarathna, Dhananji Tharuka, Keshan Shashindra, Sriyani Amarasena	Romance	Released on November 10.
Paha Samath	Jayaprakash Sivagurunadan	Uddika Premarathna, Dilhani Ekanayake, Iranganie Serasinghe, Priyantha Seneviratne, Shyam Fernando, Semini Iddamalgoda	Children's	Released on December 1.
Dr. Nawariyan	Ranjan Ramanayake	Ranjan Ramanayake, Ruwangi Rathnayake, Rex Kodippili, Srimal Wedisinghe, Sarath Kothalawala, Sarath Chandrasiri, Akila Sandakelum	Comedy, action	Released on December 8.
A Level	Rohan Perera	Jayalath Manoratne, Umali Thilakarathne, Chandani Seneviratne, Sachira Wijesinghe, Lahiruka Ekanayake, Thumindu Dodantenna	Family drama	Released on December 18.

== 2018 ==
Title	Director	Cast	Genre	Notes
2018
Adarei Man	Prageeth Rathnayake	Prageeth Rathnayake, Chathurika Pieris, Robin Fernando, Chamila Pieris, Nayana Rambukkanage, Buddhika Indurugolla	Romance	Released on January 19.
Eka Dawasaka Api	Anuruddha Jayasinghe	Pubudu Chathuranga, Nayanathara Wickramarachchi, Veena Jayakody, Medha Jayaratne, Sangeetha Basnayake, Sanjula Diwaratne	Romance	Released on February 1.
Nela	Bennett Rathnayake	Shalani Tharaka, Udara Rathnayake, Tharuka Wanniarachchi, Roshan Pilapitiya, Anura Dharmasiriwardena, Semini Iddamalgoda, Palitha Silva	Romance	Released on February 14.
Porisadaya	Siritunga Perera	Sriyantha Mendis, Udari Warnakulasooriya, Darshan Dharmaraj, Kumara Thirimadura, Kamal Deshapriya, Udara Rathnayake	Action masala	Released on February 16.
Kusal	Arjuna Kamalanath	Arjuna Kamalanath, Ameesha Kavindi, Thivru Dissanayake, Rajitha Hiran, Anura Dharmasiriwardena, Nirosha Thalagala, Anura Bandara Rajaguru, Kumari Senarathna,	Children's comedy	Released on February 22.
Komaali Kings	King Ratnam	Darshan Dharmaraj, Niranjani Shanmugaraja, King Ratnam, Gajan Kanesshan, Raja Ganesan, Kamalasiri Mohan Kumar	Thriller/Comedy	Released on February 23. This is the first Sri Lankan Tamil mass budgeted film since 40 years.
Thundenek				
Madhura Charika	Udayakantha Warnasuriya	Hemasiri Liyanage, Nalin Pradeep Udawela, Madani Malwattage, Kumara Thirimadura, Dharmapriya Dias, Sarath Chandrasiri	Drama	Released on March 16.
Seya	Kalyana Chandrasekara	Dilhani Ekanayake, Udari Perera, Menik Wijewardena, Nirosha Maithree, Deepani Silva, Gayathri Dias, Manel Wanaguru	Horror, drama	Released on March 23. It is an all female cast.
Yama Raja Siri	Sajeewa Sankalpa	Bandu Samarasinghe, Tennyson Cooray, Nadeesha Hemamali, Ronnie Leitch, Suraj Mapa, Vinu Siriwardena, Gayathri Dias, Nilmini Kottagoda, Kumara Thirimadura	Comedy	Released on March 29.
Vaishnavee	Sumitra Peries	Samadhi Arunachaya, Thumindu Dodantenne, Jayalath Manoratne, Vasanthi Chathurani, Mahendra Perera, Iranganie Serasinghe, Roshan Pilapitiya, Yashoda Wimaladharma	Comedy	Released on April 5.
Punchi Andare	Sumith Rohana Thiththawelgala	Mahendra Perera, W. Jayasiri, Maureen Charuni, Suneetha Wimalaweera, Sathischandra Edirisinghe, Manel Chandralatha, Kumara Siriwardana, Yohani Hansika	Children's	Released on April 5.
Bimba Devi Alias Yashodhara	Sunil Ariyaratne	Pallavi Subhash, Arpit Choudhary, Dineth De Silva, Udari Perera, Sangeetha Thedani, Wilson Gunaratne, Kamal Deshapriya	Epic, biographical	Released on April 26.
Wassanaye Sanda	Udayakantha Warnasuriya	Oshadi Himasha, Piyumi Hansamali, Anuj Ranasinghe, Anula Karunathilaka, Ravindra Randeniya, Srinath Maddumage, Suvineetha Weerasinghe	Drama, Romance	Released on May 25.
Raigamayai Gampalayai	Lalith Premathilake	Giriraj Kaushalya, Kumara Thirimadura, Piumi Hansamali, Wijeratne Warakagoda, Rohit Mannage, Laxman Amarasekara	Comedy	Released on June 1.
Davena Vihagun	Sanjeewa Pushpakumara	Samanalee Fonseka, Anoma Janadari, Mahendra Perera, Chandani Seneviratne, Pubudu Chathuranga, Shyam Fernando, Leonie Kotalawala	Drama	Released on June 29.
Goal	Rohan Perera	Jayalath Manoratne, Chandani Seneviratne, Lakshman Mendis, Anula Bulathsinhala, Kaushalya Fernando	Children's sports	Released on July 26.
Aladin Saha Puduma Pahana	Sumith Kumara	Dananjaya Siriwardana, Udari Warnakulasooriya, Nethu Priyangika, Senaka Titus Anthony, D.B. Gangodathenna	Fantasy, thriller	Released on July 26.
Gharasarapa	Jayantha Chandrasiri	Jackson Anthony, Kamal Addararachchi, Sangeetha Weeraratne, Devnaka Porage, Kavindya Adhikari, Yashoda Wimaladharma	Fantasy, supernatural	Released on August 10.
Kalu Hima	Upali Gamlath	Niroshan Wijesinghe, Subuddi Lakmali, Iranganie Serasinghe, Kavinga Perera, Suleka Jayawardana, Gayani Gisanthika	Drama	Released on August 29.
Kolomba Sanniya Returns	Harsha Udakanda	Sarath Kothalawala, Menaka Maduwanthi, Rajitha Hiran, Kumuduni Adikari, Sanet Dikkumbura, Rohan Wijetunga	Comedy	Released on September 21.
Nidahase Piya DS	Suneth Malinga Lokuhewa	Lakshman Mendis, Thumindu Dodantenna, Saranga Disasekara, Thisuri Yuwanika, Sriyantha Mendis, Roshan Pilapitiya, Richard Manamudali, Kamal Deshapriya, Somasiri Alakolange, Udith Abeyrathna, Palitha Silva	Biography	Released on October 13.
Udumbara	K.S Chammanthraj	Jackson Anthony, Nadeeshani Anderson, Harshi Rasanga, Sarath Kothalawala, Hirunika Premachandra, Michelle Dilhara	Sports	Released on October 25.
The Summoning	Akash Sk	Shenic Tissera, Stefania Perera, Akash Sk, Kasun Rathnasiri, Anisha Barakathulla	Horror short film	Released on October 26
Yalu Malu Yalu 2	Lal Priyadeva	Ranjan Ramanayake, Prashani Perera, Teddy Vidyalankara, Nilushi Halpita, D.B. Gangodathenna	Children's	Released on November 15.
According to Mathew	Chandran Rutnam	Jacqueline Fernandez, Alston Koch, Kian O'Grady, Gavin Ludewyke, Bimsara Premaratna	Thriller, Romance	Released on November 22.
Sarungal	Nalaka Vithanage	Charith Abeysinghe, Chamathka Lakmini, Saranga Disasekara, Soorya Dayaruwan, Shalika Edirisinghe	Drama, Romance	Released on December 14.
Athuru Mithuru Hari Apuru	Lal Priyadeva	Mahendra Perera, Suranga Satharasinghe, D.B. Gangodathenna, Don Guy, Sunil Premakumara, Manel Wanaguru	Children's	Released on December 20.
Tawume Iskole	Sunil Premaratne	Bimal Jayakody, Tharuka Wanniarachchi, Kumara Thirimadura, Umayangana Wickramasinghe, Roshan Pilapitiya, Susila Kottage	Children's	Released on December 20.

== 2019 ==
Twenty nine Sinhala language films were released in Sri Lanka along with one tamil film.

Title	Director	Cast	Genre	Notes
2019
Parliament Jokes Returns	Ranjan Ramanayake	Bandu Samarasinghe, Tennison Cooray, Ranjan Ramanayake, Nilanthi Dias, Ananda Wickramage, Freddie Silva	Comedy	Released on January 11. It is the re-screening of 2002 film.
Ginnen Upan Seethala	Anuruddha Jayasinghe	Kamal Addaraarachchi, Sulochana Weerasinghe, Jagath Manuwarna, Sujeewa Priyalal, Priyantha Sirikumara, Jehan Sri Kanth	Thriller, biographical	Released on January 19.
Sangile	Lalith Pannipitiya	Saranga Disasekara, Dulani Anuradha, Wimal Kumara de Costa, Sanath Gunathilake, Veena Jayakody, Rebeka Nirmali	Adult, romantic	Released on January 19.
Thaala	Paalitha Perera	Hemal Ranasinghe, Kalani Dodantenna, Jayalath Manoratne, Kaushalya Fernando, Chandani Seneviratne, Giriraj Kaushalya	Children's musical	Released on January 31.
Nathi Bari Tarzan	Sudesh Wasantha Pieris	Tennyson Cooray, Rajitha Hiran, Menaka Maduwanthi, Isuru Lokuhettiarachchi, Manjula Moragaha	Comedy	Released on February 22.
Dekala Purudu Kenek	Malith Hegoda	Bimal Jayakodi, Samadhi Laksiri, Jagath Manuwarna, Lakshman Mendis, Samanalee Fonseka, Nadee Kammellaweera	Drama	Released on March 8.
Katha Karana Heena	Somalatha Herath Menike	Buddhika Jayaratne, Semini Iddamalgoda, Chandrasoma Binduhewa, Ananda Atukorale, Anjana Premaratne	Family drama	Released on March 15.
Asandhimitta	Asoka Handagama	Nilmini Sigera, Dharmapriya Dias, W. Jayasiri, Yashoda Wimaladharma, Gayani Gisanthika, Shyam Fernando	Drama, thriller	Released on March 22.
Sulanga Apa Ragena Yavi	Nuwan Jayathilake	Priyankara Rathnayake, Suranga Ranawaka, Sujeewa Priyalal, Iranganie Serasinghe, Sampath Jayaweera	Drama	Released on March 22.
Iskoleta Man Awa	Prasad Samarathunga	Udith Abeyrathna, Viraj Madushan, Kumara Wanduressa, Edna Sugathapala, Rajitha Hiran, Roshana Ondaatje	Children's, drama	Released on April 5.
Weli Pawuru	Sunil Premaratne	Mahendra Perera, Dilhani Ekanayake, Kumara Thirimadura, Hemasiri Liyanage, Gayathri Dias, Tharuka Wanniarachchi	Family, drama	Released on April 16.
Thiththa Aththa	Prithiraj Weerarathna	Tennison Cooray, Don Guy, Sanath Gunathilake, Susila Kottage, Rajitha Hiran, Wilson Karunaratne, Nilmini Kottegoda, Mervyn Silva	Comedy	Released on April 20.
Suba Theraniyo	Sumith Kumara	Ruwangi Rathnayake, Roshan Ranawana, Sriyantha Mendis, Dilhani Ekanayake, Mahinda Pathirage, Udayanthi Kulatunga	Biographical	Released on May 15.
Sama Kumaru Kathawa	Nishantha Seneviratne	Wimal Kumara de Costa, Geetha Kanthi Jayakody, Rohana Beddage, Nalaka Daluwatte, Himaya Bandara, Dineth de Silva	Biographical	Released on May 31.
Goree	Harsha Udakanda	Kelum Kularathne, Roshan Ranawana, Sriyantha Mendis, Teena Shanell Fernando, Vinu Udani Siriwardhana, Rajitha Hiran, Pubudu Chathuranga	Action, thriller	Released on June 6. Remake of Tamil film Theri.
Sikuru Yogaya	Bermin Laili Fernando	Vijaya Nandasiri, Anarkali Akarsha, Tennyson Cooray, Rodney Warnakula, Amila Karunaratne, Daya Alwis, Bandula Wijeweera	Comedy	Released on June 21.
Sansare Dadayakkaraya	Prasanna Jayakody	Sanjeewa Upendra, Hemasiri Liyanage, Christina Britto, Isuru Navod, Thusitha Laknath	Drama	Released on July 4.
Maanaya	Anju Dhananjaya	Wasantha Kumaravila, Upeksha Swarnamali, Hemantha Iriyagama, Pavithra Wickramasinghe	Action, thriller	Released on July 19.
Vijayaba Kollaya	Sunil Ariyaratne	Hemal Ranasinghe, Senali Fonseka, Ashan Dias, Buddhika Jayaratne, Erdley Wedamuni, Chulakshi Ranathunga	Historical, romance	Released on August 1.
Eka Rene Kurullo	Benedict Manthrige	Cletus Mendis, Tharuka Wanniarachchi, Milinda Perera, Austin Samarawickrama, Shashiranga Wickramasekara, Sunil Liyanarachchi, Pradeepa Pathirana	Teen Drama	Released on August 30.
Jaya Sri Amathithuma	Nishantha Weerasingha	Sriyantha Mendis, Tennyson Cooray, Kusum Renu, Damitha Abeyratne, Gayathri Dias, Ariyasena Gamage, D.B. Gangodathenna, Shiromika Fernando	Comedy	Released on September 11.
Husma	Sudesh Wasantha Peiris	Pubudu Chathuranga, Dasun Pathirana, Isuru Lokuhettiarachchi, Chamathka Lakmini, Anjana Premaratne, Mahinda Ihalagama	Drama, thriller	Released on September 20.
Rush	Mahesh Munasinghe	Uddika Premarathna, Saranga Disasekara, Iresha Asanki, Lucky Dias, Sanath Gunathilake, Yureni Noshika, Isuru Lokuhettiarachchi	Action, thriller	Released on October 15.
Sakee	Indika Wickramarachchi	Mike Prasin, Krishmi Cooray, Upul Weerasinghe, Ama Kavindya, Rohitha Manawaduge, Sanjeewa Wickramasinghe, Rachel Fernando	Drama	Released on October 18.
President Super Star	Udayakantha Warnasuriya	Isuru Lokuhettiarachchi, Mahendra Perera, Sriyantha Mendis, Gihan Fernando, Sanath Gunathilake, Pubudu Chathuranga, Roshan Ranawana	Political comedy	Released on October 25.
Reload	Susantha Dharmapriya	Kumara Thirimadura, Dilhani Ekanayake, Giriraj Kaushalya, Roshan Pilapitiya, Sarath Chandrasiri, Tharuka Wanniarachchi, Mahinda Pathirage, Gayathri Dias	Drama, thriller	Released on November 20.
Parthibha	Abarna Sudan	Gajan Kaneeshan, Rashi Paba, K. Chandrasekaran, Sharon	Drama, thriller	Released on November 21. Only Tamil film in 2019.
Face to Face	Harsha Udakanda	Dineth De Silva, Roshan Ranawana, Sriyantha Mendis, Oshadi Himasha, Rajitha Hiran, D.B. Gangodathenna, Jayarathna Galagedara, Amila Karunanayake, Shehani Perera	Action, thriller	Released on November 22.
Ula Leni	Hemantha Prasad	Sanjeewa Upendra, Chameera Liyanage, Gayani Gisanthika	Psychological thriller	Released on 6 December.
U Turn	Channa Deshapriya	Chanu Dissanayake, Hemal Ranasinghe, Thumindu Dodantenna, Bimal Jayakody, Gamya Wijayadasa, Veena Jayakody	Mystery, thriller	Released on December 13.
Vishama Bhaga	Lalith Rathnayake	Jackson Anthony, Kaushalya Fernando, Hemasiri Liyanage, Thilakshini Ratnayake, Priyantha Sirikumara, Pankaja Wickramarathna, Pansilu Wickramarathna	Drama	Released on December 16.

== See also ==
- Cinema of Sri Lanka
- List of Sri Lankan films

== Sources ==
- "Sinhala Cinema Database - History about the Sinhala Cinema". Archived from the original on 2010-12-21.
- "Sandeshaya dedicated to Sri Lankan films, movies, cinema - Sri Lankan Film List".
- "'Mago-Digo-Dai' Janitha's debut ready for release". The Sunday Times (Sri Lanka). No. April 062008.
