= Giriraj Kaushalya =

Sri Lankan actor, filmmaker and comedian

Giriraj Kaushalya ගිරිරාජ් කෞශල්‍ය
- Born: Silmesthri Giriraj Kaushalya; November 13, 1964 (age 61); Kolonnawa, Sri Lanka
- Education: Gurukula Vidyalaya, Kelaniya
- Occupations: Actor, Filmmaker, Screenplay writer, Singer
- Years active: 1999–present
- Spouse: Mangalika Fernando (m. 1988)
- Children: Kavindya Nilupuli; Amandya Uthpali
- Relatives: Lalith Janakantha (brother)

Silmesthri Giriraj Kaushalya (born November 13, 1964) (Sinhala: ගිරිරාජ් කෞශල්‍ය), popularly known as Giriraj Kaushalya, is a Sri Lankan actor in Sri Lankan cinema, stage drama and television. A versatile actor from drama to comedy, Kaushalya has also worked as an assistant director, producer, script writer and filmmaker.

== Personal life ==
Kaushalya was born on 13 November 1964 in Kolonnawa, Colombo as the youngest of his parents five children. He has three elder brothers and one elder sister. He entered village school in Kolonnawa and then attended to Gurukula Vidyalaya, Kelaniya. His father was an active trade unionist in Ceylon Electricity Board and a member of the Sri Lanka Communist Party represented the Left Movement. He worked in Mahaweli Authority of Sri Lanka before entering to acting. His elder brother Lalith Janakantha is also a renowned actor in stage, television and cinema.

He met his wife Mangalika Fernando during the work in Mahaweli Authority in Lihinyagama, Mahaweli C zone in 1986. She was a draftsman and Kaushalya was a store keeper. They engaged in 1987 and wedding was celebrated in 1988. They both left the work in 1998. The couple has two daughters - Kavindya Nilupuli and Amandya Uthpali. Eldest daughter was born on 1989 and second daughter in 1994. Amandya is also a singer and actress.

He got critically ill with leukemia by the end of 2021, where he quit from acting for indefinite period. He was diagnosed with the disease in late October 2021 and in hospitalized for over 40 days at a hospital in 2022.

== Acting career ==
He worked with veteran actor Sathischandra Edirisinghe in Mahaweli Authority during Mahaweli cultural unit. Then Edirisinghe invited him to play a role in his teledrama Namal Golla, which marked his first appearance in drama career. Then he acted in Kokila Ginna directed again by Edirisinghe.

His entrance to the stage drama was an accident. He used to go for plays with elder brother Lalith. His maiden performance on stage was to stand in for an absent actor in the play Dukgannarala by Prasannajith Abeysuriya. He joined veteran dramatist Somalatha Subasinghe's drama troupe and acted in her stage plays such as Mawakage Sangramaya, Antigany and some children plays like Hima Kumari and Thoppi Welenda.

He continued performed in stage dramas for many years. His popular stage acting came through Somaratne Dissanayake's Mee Pura Wesiyo, Parakrama Niriella's Sekkuwa, Rodney Warnakula's Saranga Naven Evith and Priyantha Seneviratne's Minisa.

In 1997, he got the chance to work as assistant director in popular teledrama Nonavaruni Mahathvaruni directed by Jayaprakash Sivagurunathan. He also acted in some role in the drama as well. He wrote the scripts for a number of popular television comedies like Kathura and Ethuma 1, 2. His maiden television drama direction came through Nana Kamare which was telecasted on Swarnavahini. The serial stars Bandu Samarasinghe and became a hit in that year. He also directed the serial Mithra Samagama telecasted in TV Derana.

=== Selected stage dramas ===
- Mawakage Sangramaya
- Antigany
- Mee Pura Wesiyo
- Sekkuwa
- Saranga Nawen Awith
- Minisa
- Saadaya Marai Salli Hamarai
- Comedy Buddy
- Sudu Redi Horu

=== Selected television serials ===
- Ama as Sam uncle
- Dhawala Kadulla as Merchant
- Diya Matha Ruwa
- Ethuma 1, 2 as Kalu Mudalali
- Kotipathiyo
- Hulan Gedara as Don Meril Hulangamuwa
- Ira Awara
- Isuru Bhavana as Kuruneru
- Jeewithaya Athi Thura
- Jeewithaya Dakinna
- Kapa Nasna Samaya
- Kinnara Damanaya
- Kokila Ginna
- Man Hinda
- Namal Golla
- Me Suramya Paradisaya
- Nadagamkarayo as Kukula Mahaththaya
- Neela Palingu Diya
- Nodath Desheka Arumawanthi
- Nonavaruni Mahathvaruni
- Pabalu Menike
- Package
- Pani Kurullo
- Pingala Danawwa
- Pinibara Yamaya
- Pipi Piyum
- Punaragamanaya
- Ranga Soba
- Rathi Virathi
- Sakala Guru as Pinsiri Podi Bandara
- Sakala Guru 2
- Sakisanda Suwaris
- Sanda Dev Diyani
- Sihina Genena Kumariye
- Sihinayak Wage
- Smarana Samapthi
- Sudu Kapuru Pethi
- Suravimana
- Sihina Puraya as Bunty
- Thaksalava as Lucas Mudalali
- Wahinna Muthu Wassak

== Filmography ==
Kaushalya started his film career film Sanda Dadayama directed by Asoka Handagama, which is not screened yet. His first screened film is 1999 film Salupata Ahasata directed by Mario Jayathunga. Then he contributed in several blockbuster films such as Sikuru Hathe, Suhada Koka and Maya particularly as a comedian.

His maiden cinematic direction came through Sikuru Hathe in 2007. The film had positive reviews from critics and won several awards at local film festivals.

Key
†	Denotes films that have not yet been released

Year	Film	Role	Ref.
1999	Salupata Ahasata		
2001	Aswesuma	Hunter	
2001	Punchi Suranganavi		
2002	Mage Wam Atha	Boss's henchman	
2003	Sonduru Dadabima	Gladwin	
2004	Sooriya Arana	Salesman	
2005	Samanala Thatu	Bicycle Shop owner	
2006	Udugan Yamaya		
2007	Aganthukaya		
2007	Sankranthi		
2008	Siri Raja Siri	Theater controller	
2010	Tikiri Suwanda	Alphonsu	
2010	Suwanda Denuna Jeewithe	cameo appearance	
2011	King Hunther	Benja	
2011	Gamani	NGO officer	
2012	Prathiroo	Salesman	
2013	Bomba Saha Rosa	Police sergeant	
2013	Siri Parakum	Ven. Kalundewa Thero	
2014	Ahelepola Kumarihami	Lokuru Naide	
2014	Ko Mark No Mark	Vimukthi	
2015	Suhada Koka	Kalu Mudalali	
2015	Bora Diya Pokuna		
2015	Lantin Singho	Appu	
2015	Maya 3D	Gamini	
2017	Ali Kathawa	King's physician	
2017	Paha Samath	Bus driver	
2017	Punchi Apith Baya Na Dan	Patty Mudalali	
2018	Raigamayai Gampalayai	Raigamaya	
2019	Thaala	Kattadiya	
2019	President Super Star	multiple roles	
2019	Reload	Lekam	
2020	Tsunami	Lawyer	
2020	The Newspaper	Cabinet minister	
2020	Miss Jenis	Karu	
2023	Guththila	Magandi	
2025	Kaasi Vaasi	Amarabandu	
TBA	Thanapathilage Gedara †		
TBA	Suvisi Vivarana †		

== As a director ==
Year	Film	Ref.
2007	Sikuru Hathe	
2015	Suhada Koka	
2023	Kathuru Mithuru	

== As a writer ==
Year	Film	Ref.
2025	Kaasi Vaasi	
TBD	Mr.Mrs	

== Awards ==
He is a recipient of awards at several local film festivals.

=== Raigam Tele'es Awards ===
Year	Nominee / work	Award	Result
2010	Isuru Bhavana	Merit Award	Won

=== Sumathi Awards ===
Year	Nominee / work	Award	Result
2011	Thaksalava	Merit Award	Won

== See also ==
- Cinema of Sri Lanka
