= Kaasi Vaasi =

2025 Sri Lankan comedy film

- Sinhala: කාසි වාසි
- Directed by: Jayaprakash Sivagurunathan
- Written by: Giriraj Kaushalya
- Produced by: Anuradha B. Rekawa; Sri Lal Wickramage
- Starring: Giriraj Kaushalya; Rodney Warnakula; Priyantha Seneviratne; Sarath Kothalawala; Gihan Fernando; Amandya Uthpali
- Cinematography: Thusitha Anuradha; Prabath Darshana
- Edited by: Ajith Ramanayake
- Music by: Vihanga Muthuthanthri
- Release date: 23 January 2025
- Language: Sinhala

Kaasi Vaasi (Sinhala: කාසි වාසි) is a 2025 Sri Lankan Sinhalese comedy film directed by Jayaprakash Sivagurunathan and co-produced by Anuradha B. Rekawa and Sri Lal Wickramage for Imperial Talkies. It stars Giriraj Kaushalya in the lead role along with Rodney Warnakula, Priyantha Seneviratne, Sarath Kothalawala, Gihan Fernando and Amandya Uthpali made supportive roles.

== Plot ==
The story centers around Amarabandu, the owner of a funeral parlor named after him. He employs three assistants: 'Bass Unnahe' (the embalmer), his assistant Pinthu, and the driver Raththa. These three employees frequently disrupt the smooth functioning of the funeral parlor, leading to comedic situations.

== Cast ==
- Giriraj Kaushalya as Amarabandu mudalali, funeral parlour owner
- Rodney Warnakula as Pinthu, the embalmer
- Priyantha Seneviratne as Driver Raththa
- Sarath Kothalawala as Baas Unnehe, the embalmer
- Gihan Fernando as minister Clifford Rodrigo
- Amandya Uthpali as Chuty baby, Amarabandu's daughter
- Sampath Jayaweera as Vishma Karma, funeral parlour manager
- Sangeeth Prabhu as Saranga, Chuty baby's boyfriend
- Nethalie Nanayakkara as Rosalyn, Sadalatha's granny
- Lakshmi Damayanthi as Amarabandu's wife
- Nirosha Thalagala as Sadalatha, Raththa's girlfriend
- D. B. Gangodathenna as walking man
- Malkanthi Jayasinghe as wife fighting for dead husband
- Upatissa Balasuriya as Minister's secretary
- Aloka Sampath as son of exchanged body
- Ananda Athukorala as died wife's husband
- Daya Wayaman as walking man's worker
- Rohan Wijetunga
- Binoli Jayamali as wife fighting for dead husband
- Chamika Hathlahawaththa as Sirisoma
- Sanat Dikkumbura
- Kumara Liyanage
- Sri Lal Wickremage as Saumyapala, crematorium keeper
- Chathura Perera as Bicycle rider
- Sudharshani Gelanigama as Pinthu's wife

== Production ==
This is the fourth cinema direction by Jayaprakash Sivagurunathan, who previously made the films: King Hunther (2011), Ko Mark No Mark (2014) and Paha Samath (2017). The film also marked the fourth screenplay by Giriraj Kaushalya. Cinematography co-handled by Thusitha Anuradha and Prabath Darshana with the assistance of Harshana Gunathilaka, Tharindu Sandaruwan, Kushan Pradeep and Suresh Subhasinghe. Ajith Ramanayake is the editor, Jayantha Abeyratne is the assistant director and Manoj Wickramasinghe is the art director.

Color combination by Ananda Bandara, color planning assistantance by Madushan Rajapaksa and sound mixing by Aruna Priyantha Kaluarachchi. Jayantha Abeyratne is the chief assistant director, where Lahiru Sandaruwan is the second assistant director and Nuwan Buddhika Liyanawadu is the third assistant director.

Art direction done by Manoj Wickramasinghe with the assistance of Dimuthu Priyajanaka, Saman Sri Narayana and Bandula Weerasekara. Wasana Bandara is the makeup artist where Sakush Rajapaksa, Chathuru Weerasekara provided assistance. Production management handled by Dhammika Gunasena with the assistance of Chamika Isuru. Dhammika Pathirana made still photography. Music director is Vihanga Muthuthanthri, where song composition by Achala Solomon and Sahan Ranwala. Lyrics penned by Achala Solomon and Giriraj Kaushalya, where Sajitha Anthony, Amandya Uthpali, Rodney Warnakula and Gaminda Priyaviraj made background vocals.

== Release ==
Muhurat ceremony of the film was held at the Boralasgamuwa Tango Restaurant. The premier of the film was released at the Liberty Cinema, Kollupitiya. The film was theatrically released on 23 January 2025.
