= Clean Out =

Clean Out ක්ලීන් අවුට්
- Directed by: Roy de Silva
- Written by: Roy de Silva
- Produced by: Aruna Kanthi Films
- Starring: Rodney Warnakula; Priyantha Seneviratne; Ananda Wickramage; Wasanthi Gunarathna
- Cinematography: G. Nandasena
- Edited by: Elmo Halliday
- Music by: Sangeeth Wickramasinghe
- Production companies: Prasad Color Lab, India
- Release date: 6 February 2003
- Country: Sri Lanka
- Language: Sinhala

Clean Out (Sinhala: ක්ලීන් අවුට්) is a 2003 Sri Lankan Sinhala comedy film directed by Roy de Silva and produced by Sunil Aruna Weerasiri for Aruna Kanthi Films. It stars Rodney Warnakula, Priyantha Seneviratne and Ananda Wickramage in lead roles along with Anusha Damayanthi and Vasanthi Gunaratne. Music composed by Sangeeth Wickramasinghe. It is the 1026th Sri Lankan film in the Sinhala cinema.

== Cast ==
- Rodney Warnakula as Wickie
- Priyantha Seneviratne as Rocky
- Ananda Wickramage as Reggie
- Anusha Damayanthi as Rosalyn
- Vasanthi Gunaratne as Nandani
- Tennyson Cooray as Bookie
- Sunil Hettiarachchi as Rosalyn's father
- Rajitha Hiran as Familia's servant
- Nilanthi Dias as Familia
- Suraj Mapa as Pathale Sudha 'Sam'
- Ronnie Leitch as Japan Thattaya
- Tyrone Michael as Sudha's henchman
- Wasantha Kumaravila as Sudha's henchman
- Ranjith G. Perera as Lawyer Perera
- Mangala Premaratne as Store employee
- Teddy Vidyalankara as Sudha's extra henchman
- Sumana Amarasinghe

== Soundtrack ==
No.	Title	Singer(s)	Length
1.	"Mechchara Kal Api Denna"	Sangeeth Wickramasinghe, Prabash Kumara, Ananda Perera
2.	"Sundara Sithuwili"	Sangeeth Wickramasinghe, Prabash Kumara
3.	"On Onna Mehewara"	Sangeeth Wickramasinghe, Ananda Perera, Latha Walpola
4.	"Mohothin Dilidu Unath"	Latha Walpola, Prabash Kumara
