= Ronnie Leitch =

Sri Lankan singer and comedian (1953–2018)

Ronnie Leitch රොනී ලීච්
- Born: Ronnie Luke Leitch; October 19, 1953; Dehiwela, Sri Lanka
- Died: 1 October 2018 (aged 64); Perth, Western Australia, Australia
- Other name: Thattaya
- Occupations: Dramatist, actor, comedian, singer, presenter, and social activist
- Years active: 1972–2018
- Spouse: Yvette Leitch (m. 1986)
- Children: Keshan Leitch; Keshia Leitch
- Website: https://ronnie-leitch.webs.com

Ronnie Luke Leitch (Sinhala: රොනී ලීච්; 19 October 1953 – 1 October 2018), better known as Ronni Leitch and Thattaya (Sinhala: තට්ටයා, lit. 'Baldy'), was a Sri Lankan actor, dramatist, comedian, singer, presenter, and social activist. Largely popularized as a comedian, Leitch also gained fame for singing over 350 songs, most notably "Thattaya" and "Kauda Bole Alice".

== Family ==
Leitch was born on 19 October 1953 in Dehiwela. His father died on 26 December 2017 and the funeral took place on 27 December at 4:00 PM at the Mount Lavinia Cemetery.

He married his childhood sweetheart Yvette in 1986, and is the father of daughter Keshia and son Keshan. Leitch met Yvette first in 1974 in Bellanvila, when their homes were situated in close proximity to each other. They married on 7 June 1986. Their first child, Keshia, was born on 17 September 1989. Keshia married on 8 June 2017. Keshia is a past pupil of Bishop's College, Colombo and Keshan is an old boy of S. Thomas' College, Mount Lavinia.He has a sister called Cheryl.

== Career ==
Since the age of eight, Leitch made his foray into the entertainment industry by participating in an All Island Talent Contest. He also worked in the Defense Ministry for six years at the time of his daughter's birth.

Before entering acting, Leitch performed as a singer in many outdoor and indoor musical shows. He engaged with many musical bands in the early 1980s, such as Pioneers, Haze, Super Golden Chimes and Super Stars. He had his first overseas tour in 1986 with Super Stars. In 1989, he rose to prominence by singing his most famous solo, "Thattaya". He performed the song by invitation of The Gypsies band leaders Sunil Perera and Piyal Perera. With the huge popularity of the song, he decided to bald his head.

Leitch performed in many duets with Corrine Almeida and Mariazelle Gunathilake, which became popular hits such as "Atha Mita Kasi Panam".

Apart from acting and singing, Leitch entered television hosting with the children's program Poddange Weda which was telecasted by Sirasa TV in 2016.

Leitch was an active social activist where he was involved in charity work and donations all across the country. On 7 August 2010, he performed a musical night A Roaring Evening with Ronnie Leitch organized by The Lions Club of Athurugiriya Millennium City to raise the funds for financing community service projects.

Leitch helped the Old Thomian Swimming Club (OTSC) of S. Thomas' College, Mount Lavinia in all musical "happenings" for 12 consecutive years, and also at Royal-Thomian Big Match in the OTSC Tent with the band Wild Flowers.

== Death ==
Ronnie Leitch died on 1 October 2018 in Perth, while on a musical tour of Australia. The cause of the death was revealed as cardiac arrest. His remains were brought back to Sri Lanka on 10 October and kept at Jayaratne Florists for final rites. The body was finally buried at the Borella Cemetery on 11 October.

== Filmography ==
Starting with Athin Athata in 1973, Leitch performed as a comedian in many films. His most notable films are Re Daniel Dawal Migel and Cheriyo film series. His last film acting was in the 2018 film Yama Raja Siri, where he portrayed one of the main protagonists.

Key
†	Denotes films that have not yet been released

Year	Film	Role	Note
1983	Athin Athata	Guitarist	
1986	Yali Hamuwennai	Guitarist	
1986	Dushyanthi	Jagath	
1996	Cheriyo Darling	Meda Kess	Playback singing
1997	Savithrige Rathriya		
1997	Mother Teresa: In the Name of God's Poor	Hari	
1997	Ninja Sri Lanka		
1998	Re Daniel Dawal Migel	Cobra helper	
2000	Re Daniel Dawal Migel 2	Cobra helper	
2000	Pem Kekula		
2001	Sellan Kukka		
2001	Jack And Jill		Playback singing
2001	Kinihiriya Mal	Mr. Shopman	Playback singing
2001	Hai Hui Babi Achchi	Malu Kade Jora 'Wickramabahu Podi Appu'	
2001	Jonsun and Gonsun	Thatta Sira	
2002	Onna Babo	Mingwa	Playback singing
2002	Love 2002		
2003	Sepata Dukata Sunny	Charlie	
2003	Numba Nadan Apita Pissu	Mr. Balthazar	
2004	Clean Out	Japan Thattaya	
2004	Jolly Boys	Tricked beachgoer	
2006	Rana Hansi		
2008	Ali Pancha Mage Mithura		
2008	Ai Oba Thaniwela		
2009	Leader		
2010	Mago Digo Dai	Dhanawansa	
2010	Thank You Berty	Munidasa	
2011	Ethumai Methumai		
2011	It's a Matter of Love	Jennifer's father	
2013	Kauda Machan Alice	Thattaya	Playback singing
2013	Raja Horu	Manager	
2014	Kosthapal Punyasoma	Businessman	
2015	Lantin Singho		Playback singing
2015	My Name Is Bandu	OIC	
2016	Natannethuwa Dinna	Gunda	Playback singing
2017	Jolly Boys 2	Jimmy	
2017	Sellam Nethnam Lellam		
2017	Dr. Nawariyan	Dhanapala	
2018	Yama Raja Siri	King Yama	Last screened film before death
2018	Athuru Mithuru Hari Apuru	Police Inspector	Posthumous release
2024	Sihinayaki Adare		Posthumous release
2024	Buffalo Travels		
TBA	Elakandiye Marcus †		
TBA	Akasa Palama †		

== Discography ==
=== Albums ===
Thattaya
Tharu Wassa

Thattaya album included songs
No.	Title	Length
1.	"Thattaya" (Album Version)
2.	"Kauda Bole Alice" (Album Version)
3.	"Andare" (Album Version)
4.	"Bill Clinton" (Album Version)
5.	"Api Katada Baya" (Album Version)
6.	"Ai Api Kaluda" (Album Version)
7.	"Bothale" (Album Version)
8.	"Thatta Some" (Album Version)
9.	"Sri Lanka Australia" (Album Version)
10.	"Sudu Kelle" (Album Version)
11.	"Bad Boy" (Album Version)
12.	"Wechcha De" (Album Version)
13.	"Man Giya Apaye" (Album Version)
14.	"Paan" (Album Version)
15.	"Ice Cream" (Album Version)
16.	"Rae Mama" (Album Version)
17.	"Nenda Maama" (Album Version)

=== Solo Tracks ===
No.	Title	Length
1.	"Siseeliya" (with Rajiv Sebastian (2002 Baila Sessions in Sri Lanka album))
2.	"Srini Ape Lankawe" (2002 Pop Hits of Sri Lanka Vol. 3 album)
3.	"Atha Mita Kasi Panam" (With Corrine Almeida)
4.	"Nidimatha Mehe Na" (With Corrine Almeida)
5.	"Adda Lanuwa"
6.	"Deege Ada Wage"
7.	"Lissala Yanne"
8.	"Nonage Aale"
9.	"Waada Baila"
10.	"Darling My Love"
11.	"Loka Shoorayo"
12.	"Tikiri Malee" (with Sashini Iddamalgoda)
13.	"Ah Ha Warella" (with Rodney Warnakula)
14.	"Mage Hithe Tiyena" (with Kalawathi)
