= Kathuru Mithuru =

Sri Lankan 2023 film

- Sinhala: කතුරු මිතුරු
- Directed by: Giriraj Kaushalya
- Written by: Giriraj Kaushalya
- Story by: Giriraj Kaushalya
- Produced by: Basuru Siriwardena
- Starring: Jayalath Manoratne; Mahendra Perera; Rodney Warnakula; Priyantha Seneviratne
- Cinematography: Ruwan Costa; Thusitha Anuradha
- Edited by: Ajith Ramanayake
- Music by: Rohana Weerasinghe
- Distributed by: LFD & CEL Cinemas
- Release date: 22 September 2023
- Country: Sri Lanka
- Language: Sinhala

Kathuru Mithuru (Sinhala: කතුරු මිතුරු) is a 2023 Sri Lankan Sinhala comedy film directed by Giriraj Kaushalya and produced by Basuru Siriwardena for Alankulama Films. The film stars Jayalath Manoratne and Mahendra Perera in lead role whereas Rodney Warnakula and Priyantha Seneviratne made supportive roles.

== Plot ==
Wilson and Samson are best friends that bond goes beyond blood ties. Wilson is a traditional barber. Samson is a traditional tailor. Wilson has a daughter. Samson has a son. Both of them come to the village after completing their university education due to lack of employment opportunities for their education. Finally they try to get involved in their fathers' jobs. But Wilson and Samson's intention is to see their daughter and son do a highly regarded job in the administrative service. In time, the son and daughter finally turned to barber and tailor careers like their fathers. Unlike their fathers, the daughter and son begin to follow a different path, changing tradition.

The film received positive reviews from critics for acting, plot and background. However, the love song scenario and the fight scene received negative reviews.

== Cast ==
- Jayalath Manoratne as Samson, the tailor
- Mahendra Perera as Wilson, the barber
- Rodney Warnakula as Wilson's assistant
- Priyantha Seneviratne as Samson's assistant
- Sandani Hettiarachchi as Krishanthi, Wilson's daughter
- Rasanjana Nandasiri as Krishantha, Samson's son
- Maureen Charuni as Samson's wife
- Jayani Senanayake as Wilson's wife

=== Minor cast ===
- Mihira Sirithilaka as curly hair cut man
- D. B. Gangodathenna as jaw clenched man
- Gihan Fernando as thug
- Sahan Ranwala as fat man
- Wasantha Wittachchi as man with half hair
- Ananda Athukorala as shaving bruised man
- Sampath Jayaweera as mman with John Cena cut
- Lalith Jayakantha as Money lender
- Chandrasoma Binduhewa as dance teacher
- Daya Wayaman as alcoholic man
- D. B. Gangodathenna as Old thin man in barber shop
- Nimal Yatiwella
- S. I. Samarakkody
- Saman Hemaratne as husband of fat lady
- Upatissa Balasuriya
- Shiromika Fernando
- Sudara Randini
- Gamini Ambalangoda
- Rupa Pathirana
- Nimal Jayasinghe

== Production ==
Basuru Siriwardena has produced the film for Alankulama Films as his maiden film production. Creative design and sponsorship for film was given by Jayaprakash Sivagurunathan. The song lyrics penned by Bandara Eheliyagoda, Nilar N. Kasim, Achala Solomons whereas songs sung by Amarasiri Peiris, Amandya Uthpali, Tharaka Gunaratne, Jayalath Manoratne, Mahendra Perera, Rodney Warnakula, and Priyantha Seneviratne. Rasanjana Nandasiri, the son of late actor Vijaya Nandasiri also made his film debut. The film has been shot in and around Mawanella.

== Release ==
Even though the film was scheduled to release in December 2020 in CEL theatres, it was delayed due to sudden illnesses caused for lead actor Jayalath Manoratne and director Giriraj Kaushalya. The trailer for the film has been released online in March 2020. The film had a special screening on the 5 September 2020 at the Liberty Cinema Hall, Colombo during the second day of the Scope Film Festival. It was also possible to screen the highest number of screenings in a single day in a foreign country for a Sri Lankan film, where the film screened in both Australia and Canada.

The premier of the film was held on 21 September 2023 in Scope Cinema, Colombo. The film was released on 22 September 2023 in LFD and CEL theatres.
