= Supiri Andare =

- Sinhala: සුපිරි අන්දරේ
- Directed by: Michel Fonseka
- Written by: Sarathchandra Paththanduwana; Senarath Peris
- Produced by: KPL Baiscope Films
- Starring: Tennyson Cooray; Sanoja Bibile; Rodney Warnakula
- Cinematography: Anura Somasiri
- Edited by: Anusha Jayawardena
- Music by: Sarath Wickrama
- Release date: 17 April 2014
- Country: Sri Lanka
- Language: Sinhala

Supiri Andare (Sinhala: සුපිරි අන්දරේ) is a 2014 Sri Lankan Sinhala comedy film directed by Michel Fonseka and co-produced by Krishan Dilipa Perera and Placidus I. Fernando for KPL Baiscope Films. It stars Tennyson Cooray, Sanoja Bibile, and Rodney Warnakula in lead roles along with Wimal Kumara de Costa, Tissa Wijesurendra and Dayasiri Hettiarachchi. It is the 1205th Sri Lankan film in the Sinhala cinema. This film is the acting debut for Lakshika Jayawardana.

== Cast ==
- Tennyson Cooray as Gulliver / Andare
- Sanoja Bibile as Juhi Chawla
- Rodney Warnakula as Salman Khan
- Lakshika Jayawardana as Madhuri Dixit
- Tissa Wijesurendra as Shahrukh Khan
- Wimal Kumara de Costa as Baby
- Devinda Marcus
- Dayasiri Hettiarachchi

== Soundtrack ==
No.	Title	Singer(s)	Length
1.	"Ba Ba Black Ship"	Senali Abeyratne
2.	"Ada Kala Bila Imu"	Sangeeth Wickramasinghe, Sampath Seneviratne,
3.	"Yayen Yaye Ase"	Nuwan Gunawardana
4.	"Kola Nathi Ala Nathi"	Sangeeth Wickramasinghe, Senali Abeyratne
