= Kolamba Sanniya Returns =

- Sinhala: කොළඹ සන්නිය Returns
- Directed by: Harsha Udakanda
- Written by: Harsha Udakanda
- Produced by: Sahan Abeywardena Shermal Dilshan Dinith Cornett
- Starring: Sarath Kothalawala; Menaka Maduwanthi; Rajitha Hiran
- Cinematography: Janith Gunasekara
- Edited by: Thivanka Amarasiri
- Music by: Gayan Udawaththa
- Production company: Flash Entertainment
- Distributed by: MPI Theaters
- Release date: 21 September 2018
- Country: Sri Lanka
- Language: Sinhala

Kolamba Sanniya Returns (Sinhala: කොළඹ සන්නිය Returns) is a 2018 Sri Lankan Sinhala comedy film directed by Harsha Udakanda and co-produced by Sahan Abeywardena, Shermal Dilshan and Dinith Cornett. It stars Sarath Kothalawala and Menaka Maduwanthi in lead roles along with Rajitha Hiran and Kumuduni Adikari. Music composed by Gayan Udawaththa. It is the remake of 1976 film Kolamba Sanniya by Manik Sandrasagara. It is the 1312th Sri Lankan film in the Sinhala cinema.

== Cast ==
- Sarath Kothalawala as Andiris
- Menaka Maduwanthi as Andiris' divorced wife
- Sanet Dikkumbura as Jacolis, Andiris' elder brother
- Rajitha Hiran as Hichcha, Andiris' younger brother
- Kumuduni Adikari as Andiris' elder sister
- Rohan Wijetunga as Mustafa
- Ashika Mathasinghe as Ahinsa, Andiris' new wife
- Gayathri Kanchanamali as Divorced wife's sister
- Rasika Nimali as Andiris' younger sister
- Boniface Jayasantha as Chaminda Niriwasthara
- D.B. Gangodathenna as Man at shopping complex
- Harindu Perera as Harry

== Soundtrack ==
The film contain only one song. This lyrics is written by Karunaratne Abeysekera including 'Saradham' where sung by N.M Raja and Jamuna Rani.

No.	Title	Lyrics	Singer(s)	Length
1.	"Preethiyen Sathutin Imu"	Karunaratne Abeysekera	Ayomi Perera, Gayan Udawatte
