= Kawda Machan Alice =

- Sinhala: කවුද මචං ඇලිස්
- Directed by: Lesli Siriwardana
- Written by: Lesli Siriwardana
- Produced by: Raj Ranasinghe; Ashok Ranasinghe
- Starring: Wimal Kumara de Costa; Ronnie Leitch; Wilson Gunaratne
- Cinematography: Nimal Rosa
- Edited by: Mahendra Kulathilaka
- Music by: Somapala Rathnayake
- Distributed by: Fire Works Films
- Release date: 29 March 2013
- Country: Sri Lanka
- Language: Sinhala

Kawda Machan Alice (Sinhala: කවුද මචං ඇලිස්) is a 2013 Sri Lankan Sinhala comedy film directed by Lesli Siriwardana and co-produced by Raj Ranasinghe and Ashok Ranasinghe. It stars Wimal Kumara de Costa and Ronnie Leitch in lead roles along with Wilson Gunaratne and Samanthi Lenarol. Music composed by Somapala Rathnayake. It is the 1193rd Sri Lankan film in the Sinhala cinema.

== Cast ==
- Wimal Kumara de Costa
- Ronnie Leitch
- Wilson Gunaratne
- Samanthi Lenarol
- Harshani Perera
- Evon Goh
- Arshad Ahamad
- Senarath Gunasekara
- Indika Rathanayaka
- Ayesha Frenando
- Thariya Kenadi
