= Ethumai Methumai =

- promotional poster
- Sinhala: එතුමයි මෙතුමයි
- Directed by: Nishantha Weerasingha
- Written by: Nishantha Weerasingha
- Produced by: Nilwala Films
- Starring: Rodney Warnakula; Priyantha Seneviratne; Anarkali Akarsha
- Cinematography: Gamini Chaminda
- Edited by: Samantha Wickramasinghe
- Music by: George Senanayake
- Release date: 15 November 2011
- Country: Sri Lanka
- Language: Sinhala

Ethumai Methumai (Sinhala: එතුමයි මෙතුමයි) is a 2011 Sri Lankan Sinhala comedy film directed by Nishantha Weerasingha and produced by Upul Jayasinghe for Nilwala Films. It stars Rodney Warnakula, Priyantha Seneviratne and Anarkali Akarsha in lead roles along with Duleeka Marapana and Anton Jude. Music composed by George Senanayake. It is the 1165th Sri Lankan film in the Sinhala cinema.

== Cast ==
- Rodney Warnakula as Bothal Sira
- Priyantha Seneviratne as Kusumsiri
- Anarkali Akarsha as Teena
- Duleeka Marapana as Kusumsiri's wife
- Ananda Wickramage as Silva
- Anton Jude as Andapala, Sira's thug friend
- Mahinda Pathirage as Tyson
- Susila Kottage as Fishing lady
- Ronnie Leitch as Chinese doctor
- Hemantha Iriyagama as Hospital security officer
- Shehara Hewaduwa as Thanuja, Kusumsiri's mistress
- Ruwan Wasantha
- Chalani Balasuriya
- Ruwangi Rathnayake as Nurse
- D.B. Gangodathenna as Ladder house man
- Nishantha Muthuhettigamage in cameo role

== Soundtrack ==
No.	Title	Singer(s)	Length
1.	"Lokka Ape Lokka"	Pradeep Anjana
2.	"Obai Heda Une"	Pradeep Anjana, Mesha Dhananjani
3.	"Sandapane"	Pradeep Anjana, Mesha Dhananjani
