= Kosthapal Punyasoma =

- Theatrical release poster
- Sinhala: කොස්තාපල් පුඤ්ඤසෝම
- Directed by: Udayakantha Warnasuriya
- Written by: Udayakantha Warnasuriya
- Produced by: Sunil T. Films; Bahuru Films
- Starring: Mahendra Perera; Sriyantha Mendis; Gamini Hettiarachchi; Duleeka Marapana
- Cinematography: Ayeshman Hettiarachchi
- Edited by: Pravin Jayaratne
- Music by: Mahesh Denipitiya
- Release date: 2 May 2014
- Country: Sri Lanka
- Language: Sinhala
- Box office: 600 LKR Lakhs (in 50 days)

Kosthapal Punyasoma (Sinhala: කොස්තාපල් පුඤ්ඤසෝම) is a 2014 Sri Lankan Sinhala comedy thriller film directed by Udayakantha Warnasuriya and co-produced by Yohan Premaratne and Sunil T. Fernando for Bahuru Films and Sunil T. Films. It stars Mahendra Perera in the titular role along with Srinath Maddumage, Gamini Hettiarachchi, Sriyantha Mendis, Ravindra Yasas and Duleeka Marapana in supportive roles. Music composed by Mahesh Denipitiya. It is the 1206th Sri Lankan film in the Sinhala cinema.

The film has been shot in Colombo and its suburbs. The film passed successful 50 days, earning 600 Lakhs of Sri Lankan rupees.

== Plot ==
A police officer called Kosthapal Punyasoma is the main character of this film. He tries to catch thieves but is not successful. One day, a thief called Anton and his friends kidnap a bride.

== Cast ==
- Mahendra Perera as Kosthapal Punyasoma
- Sriyantha Mendis as OIC Panditharathna
- Gamini Hettiarachchi as Sargent Wickrampala
- Duleeka Marapana as Champa
- Ronnie Leitch as Businessman
- Ananda Athukorala as Shanika's groom
- Srinath Maddumage as Anton
- Menik Wijewardena as Shanika
- Viraj Jayasiri as Prashan
- Ravindra Yasas as Anton's henchman
- Lahiru Mudalige as Prashan's friend
- Nilmini Kottegoda as Sargent's wife
- Chathura Perera as Bus thief
- D.B. Gangodathenna as Bus thief victim

== Soundtrack ==
No.	Title	Lyrics	Singer(s)	Length
1.	"Idala Hitala Dunnath"	Shehan Galahitiyawa	Nalin Perera, Lanthra Perera
2.	"Oba Enna Aye"	Nilar N. Kasim	Bathiya Jayakodi, Meena Prasadini
