= Sakee =

- Sinhala: සකී
- Directed by: Indika Wickramarachchi
- Written by: Indika Wickramarachchi
- Produced by: Samagi Films
- Starring: Mike Prasin; Krishmi Cooray; Upul Weerasinghe
- Cinematography: Asanga Devapriya; Poorna Jayasri
- Edited by: Indika Wickramarachchi
- Music by: Sujeewa Indika
- Distributed by: MPI Theaters
- Release date: 18 November 2019
- Country: Sri Lanka
- Language: Sinhala

Sakee (Sinhala: සකී) is a 2019 Sri Lankan Sinhala children's drama film directed and produced by Indika Wickramarachchi for Samagi Films collaborated with Youth Cinema Resort. It stars new cast of actors and actresses where Mike Prasin, Krishmi Cooray, Manjula Saman Kumari and Upul Weerasinghe in lead roles along with Amaa Kavindya and Rohitha Manawaduge. Music composed by Sujeewa Indika.

== Plot ==
Eleven-year-old Saki is a poor boy living in a remote village in the dry zone. His father's job is to run the illegal drug trade of Sediris Mudalali, a local gangster. He strongly believes that his son Saki has a fatal misfortune according to his birth chart. Although he tries to suppress it with his family, he suffers from mental stress due to the fear of fatal misfortune from time to time and has frequent conflicts with little Saki. The child, deeply shaken by the loss of his father's affection, takes a decisive step in his life to relieve his father's mental stress. There, Saki's father abandons the illusion he has been holding onto for a long time and realizes the truth.

== Cast ==
- Mike Prasin
- Krishmi Cooray
- Upul Weerasinghe
- Ama Wickramarachchi
- Rohitha Manawaduge
- Sanjeewa Wickramasinghe
- Rachel Fernando
- Upul Weerasinghe
- Gunapala Manatunga
- Saki Sithumina
- Manjula Saman Kumari
- Palitha Amarasekara

== Songs ==
The film consist with two songs.

No.	Title	Lyrics	Singer(s)	Length
1.	"Mee Masso Ranchu Gasena"	Piyasena Guruge	Ama Kavindya, Chanuk Dabare, Nethmini Uthpala
2.	"Walakulen Ahasa Wage"	Piyasena Guruge	Ama Kavindya, Chanuk Dabare, Nethmini Uthpala, Vihasna Perera, Sehasna Dias, Janendri Bandara
