= Punchi Apith Baya Na Dan =

- Sinhala: පුංචි අපිත් බය නෑ දැන්
- Directed by: Priyantha Pathirage
- Written by: Vijayasiri Mallikarachchi
- Produced by: Priyajanaka Gamage; Sandeep Sanraj
- Starring: Mahinda Pathirage; Giriraj Kaushalya; Rajitha Hiran
- Cinematography: Gamini Chamindage
- Edited by: Randika Wijemanna
- Music by: Lassana Jayasekara
- Production companies: Movie Color Lab, Mumbai
- Distributed by: LFD Theatres
- Release date: 21 July 2017
- Country: Sri Lanka
- Language: Sinhala

Punchi Apith Baya Na Dan (Little Us Don't Fear Now) (Sinhala: පුංචි අපිත් බය නෑ දැන්) is a 2017 Sri Lankan Sinhala children's adventure film directed by Priyantha Pathirage and co-produced by Priyajanaka Gamage and Sandeep Sanraj. It stars Mahinda Pathirage and Giriraj Kaushalya in lead roles along with Rajitha Hiran, Susantha Chandramali and Milinda Perera. Music composed by Lassana Jayasekara. According to the director, the filming completed four years ago in 2013, but due to many reasons, it took four years to screen the film in 2017. It is the 1283rd Sri Lankan film in the Sinhala cinema.

== Cast ==
- Mahinda Pathirage as Colombus
- Giriraj Kaushalya as Patty Mudalali
- Rajitha Hiran as Diyasena
- Susantha Chandramali as Wimala
- Milinda Perera as Jayasiri
- Samanthi Lanarol as Siriya
- Nilmini Buwaneka as Nanda
- Wasantha Kumarasiri as OIC
- Tissa Bandaranayake as Chief monk
- Kelum Niroshan as Babayya
- Janaka Priyankara as Lokuu
- Sandeep Sanraj as Babee
- Ranjith Galagedara as Sara

=== Child cast ===
- Sachith Chathuranga as Pasindu
- Dilki Nethimini as Rashmi
- Santhus Dilhara as Bhanuka
- Ishani Vidurangana as Tharuka
- Nimindu Chamil as Shanilka
- Nimen Wickramaratne as Kaluwaa
- Chandeep Wasala as Little monk

== Songs ==
No.	Title	Lyrics	Singer(s)	Length
1.	"Aluth Irak"	Vijayasiri Mallikarachchi	Hesha Minradhi, Matheesha Nimsara, Upeka Rukshan, Vidusha Nethranjali
