= Duleeka Marapana =

Sri Lankan actress and media personality

- දුලිකා මාරපන
- Born: Wasala Kulathun Wijekoon Mudiyanselage Dulika Kumari Wijekoon Marapane; 15 November 1975 (age 50); Kandy, Sri Lanka
- Education: Hillwood College, Kandy; St.Joseph's College Kegalle
- Alma mater: University of Kelaniya
- Occupations: Actress; Director; Producer; Painter; Public speaker; Philanthropist
- Years active: 1997–present
- Spouse: Sujeewa Priyal (m. 2015)

Wasala Kulathun Wijekoon Mudiyanselage Duleeka Kumari Wijekoon Marapana commonly as Duleeka Marapana (Sinhala: දුලිකා මාරපන; born 15 November 1975), is an actress in Sri Lankan stage, television and cinema as well as a public speaker, director, producer and philanthropist. Marapana is best known for the role "Dingiri Amma" in Malee teledrama. Apart from acting, she is the Founder of 3rdbell Productions and Academy, the Chairperson CO CO productions and founder of Northwest films.

== Career ==
Marapana started her acting career in 1997 while in university, starring in various stage dramas. Her most-notable dramas were Sapathnee (best actress), Swarnama (best actress), Katu Yahana (nominated), Sevanali Ha Minissu, House of Bernarda Alba (best supporting actress) Katu Yahana and Upanda Maranaya.

In 2014 she appeared in her own production of Lawrencege Manamali, alongside her husband Sujeewa Priyal Yaddehige. Their wedding was celebrated during the stage drama performed on 13 and 14 August 2015. The play received huge popularity and has been staged more than 380 shows island-wide.

In Sumathi Awards, Marapana won the Best Actress Award for her role in Depath Nai, Himakatayam, Rathriya, Sudheera, Isuru Bawana, Ridee Ittankaraya, and Me Wasantha Kalayai. After that, her most-popular role "Dingiri Amma" came through the teledramas Malee and Aththamma. For both serials, she won People's Award two times. In 2019, she appeared in the popular Sudu Anguru and stage play Lawrencege Manamali. Recently, she appeared in the serials, Internasanal 1 and 2 and Pork Street.

The actress, who is also actively engaged in environmental conservation and activism, played a lead role in an environmental film Suparna directed by her husband. Apart from that, she acted with critics acclaimed roles in the films such as Sooriya Arana, Kosthapal Punyasoma, Samanala Thatu, Walapatala, Sinhaya and Daruwane.

=== Notable works ===
- Acid
- Amarabandu Rupasinghe
- Aththamma as Dingiri Amma
- Dangakara Tharu
- Depath Nai
- Divithura as Deepika
- E Brain
- Ehala Maha Nikinna
- Eka Iththaka Mal as Kanthi
- Heenayaki Me Adare
- Hima Katayam as Damayanthi
- Internasanal 1 & 2 as Disna
- Isuru Bhawana as Violet Nona
- Kaluwara Anduna
- Kiyadenna Adare Tharam
- Malee as Dingiri Amma
- Neela Palingu Diya as Ariyawathi
- Pipi Piyum
- Pork Veediya
- Punchi Walauwwa as Mary Mekhala
- Rathi Virathi
- Rathriya as Sangeetha
- Ridee Ittankaraya as Punchi Menika
- Roda Hatara Manamalaya
- Sabba Sakala Mana
- Sanda Amavakai as Sandamali
- Sandawathaka Waruna
- Sara as Veronica
- Satharadenek Senpathiyo
- Sihina Tawuma
- Sihinayak Wage
- Sihini as Thalatha
- Sudeera as Shahini Lellawala
- Sudu Anguru as Patta Rani
- Thalaya Soyana Geethaya
- Wes Benduma

== Awards ==
Marapana has won many awards in theater, cinema and television award ceremonies.

- Nominated as best actress for her first tele drama " Sanda Amawakai"
- Best Actress in Inter-University Drama Festival 1997 (Nizerla)
- Best Actress inter-University Drama Festival 1998 (Jeewithe Mithyawa)
- Best Actress National State Short drama festival 1999 – Sapathmee
- Best Actress National State Drama Festival 2000 – Swarnamali ( directed by professor Bandula Jayawardana )
- Best Actress Sumathi Awards 2004 – Depath Nai
- Best Actress Sumathi Awards 2005 – Hima Katayam(Snow Designs)
- Best Supporting Actress National Teledrama Festival "Rathriya"(Night)
- SIGNIS Best performance of the Year 2007 – Samanala Thatu film( Butterfly wings )
- Best Actress Sumathi Awards 2010 – Ridee Itankaraya
- Best Actress in Raigam Tele'es 2010 – Isuru Bawana
- Best Supporting Actress 2011 – Me Wasantha Kalayai
- Best Supporting Actress National Drama Festival 2012 – The House of Bernada Alba
- Best Actress in 8th Mass Lanka Film Awards 2013
- SLIIM Nielson Peoples awards 2015 Best Actress
- SLIIM Nielson Peoples awards 2016 Best Actress

== Filmography ==
Key
†	Denotes films that have not yet been released

Year	Film	Role	Ref.
2003	Pura Sakmana		
2003	Irasma	Paali	
2004	Sooriya Arana	Sediris's wife	
2005	Samanala Thatu	Batti	
2006	Udugan Yamaya	Mother	
2008	Hathara Denama Soorayo remake	Bath amma, Soma's mother	
2008	Walapatala	Nurse Sheela	
2010	Tikiri Suwanda	Samanmalee	
2011	Mahindagamanaya	Magani	
2011	Ethumai Methumai	Kusumsiri's wife	
2012	Super Six	Jude's mother	
2012	Daruwane	Anjula	
2013	Double Trouble	Duleeka	
2014	Kosthapal Punyasoma	Champa	
2015	Lantin Singho	Nurse	
2015	Sinhaya	Punchi akka	
2016	Puthandiya	Ajith's mother	
2016	Hero Nero	Mrs. Lionel	
2017	Ali Kathawa	Gomari	
2020	Suparna	Suparna	
2020	Miss Jenis	Mrs. Makalanda	
2021	Kawuruth Danne Na		
2022	CineMa	Rupalatha	
2022	Rashmi	Mannakkara's wife	
2024	Weerya	Kohilawaththe Johana	
2026	Sargent Punchisoma	Sundari, Punchisoma's wife	
TBA	Kondadeniye Hamuduruwo †		
TBA	Adda Lanuwa Damma Kodiya †		
TBA	Amawaka †	Education officer	
TBA	Amuthu Gurukamak †		
TBA	Amuthu 3k †		
TBA	Chandarege Wife †		
TBA	Megha Warsha †		
