= Punchi Andare =

- Sinhala: පුංචි අන්දරේ
- Directed by: Sumith Rohana Thiththawelgala
- Written by: Mahinda Kumara Dalupotha
- Based on: Punchi Andare (Novel)
- Produced by: Rajitha Swaris
- Starring: Praveen Katukithule; Mahendra Perera; Sathischandra Edirisinghe
- Cinematography: Ashoka Jayasekara
- Edited by: Jagath Weerathunga
- Music by: Rohana Weerasinghe
- Distributed by: EAP
- Release date: 5 March 2018
- Country: Sri Lanka
- Language: Sinhala

Punchi Andare (Sinhala: පුංචි අන්දරේ, lit. 'Little Andare') is a 2018 Sri Lankan Sinhala children's comedy film directed by veteran director Sumith Rohana Thiththawelgala and produced by Rajitha Swaris. The film stars child actor Praveen Katukithule with Mahendra Perera, Sathischandra Edirisinghe in lead roles along with W. Jayasiri and Maurine Charuni. The music is composed by Rohana Weerasinghe. It is the 1303th Sri Lankan film in the Sinhala cinema.

== Cast ==
- Praveen Katukithule as Andare
- Mahendra Perera as Andare's father
- Sathischandra Edirisinghe as Andare's grand father
- W. Jayasiri
- Maureen Charuni as Andare's mother
- Poshini Dissanayake as Andare's sister
- Yohani Hansika as Andare's cousin sister
- Manel Chandralatha
- Suneetha Wimalaweera
- Udeni Alwis
- Kumara Siriwardana as Dankotuwa Rala
- Berty Susiripala
- Mapalagama Wimalarathna
