= Ula Leni =

- Sinhala: උලළේනි
- Directed by: Hemantha Prasad
- Written by: Hemantha Prasad
- Produced by: P2 Bond & Wind Creations
- Starring: Gayani Gisanthika; Sanjeewa Upendra
- Cinematography: Mayura Kaushalya
- Edited by: Tharaka Beddage
- Music by: Chamara Nugaliyadde
- Release date: 6 December 2019
- Running time: CEL Theaters
- Country: Sri Lanka
- Language: Sinhala

Ula Leni (Sinhala: උලළේනි) is a 2019 Sri Lankan Sinhala psychological thriller film directed by Hemantha Prasad as his maiden cinematic direction and produced by Arosha Fernando for P2 Bond & Wind Creations. The film stars Gayani Gisanthika and Sanjeewa Upendra in lead roles. Music composed by Chamara Nugaliyadde.

== Cast ==
- Gayani Gisanthika as Rooth
- Sanjeewa Upendra
- Chameera Liyanage
- Terry Anton
