= Raja Mamai =

- Sinhala: රජා මමයි
- Directed by: Kalyana Chandrasekera
- Written by: Bhathiya Madanayake
- Produced by: Nero Entertainment
- Starring: Bindu Botalegama; Premadasa Vithanage; Chathura Perera
- Cinematography: Daya Sooriyarachchi
- Edited by: Ruwan Chamara
- Music by: Sarath Wickrama
- Release date: 28 October 2016
- Country: Sri Lanka
- Language: Sinhala

Raja Mamai (Sinhala: රජා මමයි) is a 2016 Sri Lankan Sinhala comedy film directed by Kalyana Chandrasekera and produced by A. Parister for Nero Entertainment. It stars Bindu Botalegama in lead role along with Premadasa Vithanage and Chathura Perera. Music composed by Sarath Wickrama. It is the 1262nd Sri Lankan film in the Sinhala cinema.

== Cast ==
- Bindu Botalegama as Chammi Panawanna / IC Pradeep
- Madhi Panditharatne as Theja Thenuwara
- Premadasa Vithanage as Peter Thenuwara
- Chathura Perera
- Dayasiri Hettiarachchi as Mudalali
- Manel Chandralatha as Violet

== Soundtrack ==
| No. | Title | Lyrics | Singer(s) | Length |
|---|---|---|---|---|
| 1. | "Wifi Nikan Labuna" | Chandradasa Fernando | Roshan Pilapitiya, Ginger White |
| 2. | "Adare Geethaye" | Chandradasa Fernando | Gayathri Rajapakse, Pradeep Anjana |
