= Pitasakwala Abirahasa =

- Sinhala: පිටසක්වල අභිරහස
- Directed by: Nirmal Rajapakse
- Written by: Nirmal Rajapakse
- Produced by: Nirmal Rajapakse; NFC Films
- Starring: Lasantha Kamalsiri; Shamila Vijini; Vimukthi Udara
- Cinematography: Nirmal Rajapakse
- Edited by: Nirmal Rajapakse
- Music by: Kaushal Stanley; Sudesh Nissanka
- Production company: Sarasavi Studio
- Distributed by: CEL Theatres
- Release date: 2011
- Running time: 108 minutes
- Country: Sri Lanka
- Language: Sinhala

Pitasakwala Abirahasa (Sinhala: පිටසක්වල අභිරහස, lit. 'The Mystery of Extraterrestrial') is a 2011 Sri Lankan Sinhala thriller fantasy & Science fiction film directed by debutant director Nirmal Rajapakse and produced by Nirmal Rajapakse himself along with NFC Films. It stars almost all newcomers in to cinema, including Lasantha Kamalsiri, Shamila Vijini in lead roles along with Vimukthi Udara and Maduri Poornima. Music and special sounds effects co-composed by Kaushal Stanley and Sudesh Nissanka. It is the 1152nd Sri Lankan film in the Sinhala cinema.

== Cast ==
- Lasantha Kamalsiri as Lasantha
- Shamila Vijini as Piyumi
- Vimukthi Udara as Milan
- Maduri Poornima
- Arosha Kanchana
- Randhika Nuwan as Damith
- Anjula Gamage
- Thilina Anuradha as Asela
- Chamila Dhananjani
  - Dubbing artistes
    - Bimba Darshi as Piyumi
    - Lionel Gunaratne as Alien
    - Achini Bandaranayake as Lakshika
