= Raja Horu =

- Sinhala: රජ හොරු
- Directed by: Suranga de Alwis
- Written by: Nishantha Weerasinghe
- Produced by: Evoke Films
- Starring: Ranjan Ramanayake; Arjuna Kamalanath; Ariyasena Gamage; Buddhika Jayaratne
- Cinematography: Sajitha Weerpperuma
- Edited by: Pravin Jayaratne
- Music by: Sarath de Alwis
- Distributed by: Ridma & CEL Theatres
- Release date: 21 November 2013
- Country: Sri Lanka
- Language: Sinhala

Raja Horu (Sinhala: රජ හොරු) is a 2013 Sri Lankan Sinhala comedy film directed and produced by Suranga de Alwis. It stars Ranjan Ramanayake, Arjuna Kamalanath, and Buddhika Jayaratne in lead roles along with Ariyasena Gamage, Himali Siriwardena and Sriyani Amarasena. Music composed by Sarath de Alwis. The film was influenced by Bollywood film Hera Pheri which itself was adopted from Malayalam film Ramji Rao Speaking which turn was based on the 1971 Television film See The Man Run. It is the 1198th Sri Lankan film in the Sinhala cinema.

== Cast ==
- Ranjan Ramanayake as Mahesh
- Arjuna Kamalanath as Sirimal
- Ariyasena Gamage as Sumanapala
- Buddhika Jayaratne as OIC Kapila
- Himali Siriwardena as Shanika
- Sriyani Amarasena Mahesh's mother
- Sandun Wijesiri as Dunusinghe
- Ronnie Leitch as Manager
- D.B. Gangodathenna as Makka
- Eardley Wedamuni as Prabha
- Premadasa Vithanage as Mudalali
- Hemantha Iriyagama as Maradankadawala Gune
- Nishani Gamage as Siba
- Damitha Saluwadana

== Soundtrack ==
| No. | Title | Lyrics | Singer(s) | Length |
|---|---|---|---|---|
| 1. | "Jeevithe Yana Gamane" | Saman Chandranath Weerasinghe | Buddhika Ushan, Udayanga Suresh, Rukman Asitha |
