= Athuru Mithuru Hari Apuru =

- Official poster
- Directed by: Lal Priyadeva
- Written by: Lal Priyadeva
- Produced by: Balaji Cine Films
- Starring: Mahendra Perera; Suranga Satharasinghe; Don Guy
- Cinematography: Manjula Kumaratunga
- Edited by: Thilanka Perera
- Music by: Edward Jayakody
- Distributed by: CEL Theaters
- Release date: 20 December 2018
- Country: Sri Lanka
- Language: Sinhala

Athuru Mithuru Hari Apuru (Sinhala: අතුරු මිතුරු හරි අපූරු) is a 2018 Sri Lankan Sinhalese children's film directed by Lal Priyadeva and co-produced by N. Udaya Kumar and P. Arooran for Balaji Cine Films. It stars Mahendra Perera in lead role along with Don Guy and popular television comedian Suranga Satharasinghe, who made his maiden cinema appearance. Music composed by Edward Jayakody. It is the 1318th Sri Lankan film in the Sinhalese cinema.

== Cast ==
- Mahendra Perera
- Suranga Satharasinghe
- Rajiv Nanayakkara
- D.B. Gangodathenna
- Sunil Premakumara
- Don Guy
- Samantha Higurage
- Gamini Subasinghe
- Inoka Edirisinghe
- Manel Wanaguru
- Ariyasena Gamage
- Sugath Janaka
- Ronnie Leitch
