= Aladin Saha Puduma Pahana =

- Directed by: Sumith Kumara
- Based on: Stories of Aladdin
- Produced by: Prasad Wijesuriya
- Starring: Dhananjaya Siriwardena; Udari Warnakulasooriya; Nethu Priyangika
- Cinematography: Nilantha Chularatne
- Edited by: Shan Alwis
- Music by: Dr. Ruwin Dias
- Production company: Ravindu Entertainment
- Release date: 26 July 2018
- Country: Sri Lanka
- Language: Sinhala

Aladin Saha Puduma Pahana (Sinhala: ඇලඩින් සහ පුදුම පහන) is a 2018 Sri Lankan Sinhalese fantasy thriller film directed by Sumith Kumara and produced by Prasad Wijesuriya. It stars Dhananjaya Siriwardena and Udari Warnakulasooriya in lead roles along with Nethu Priyangika and D.B. Gangodathenna. Music composed by Ruvin Diaz. It is the 1308th Sri Lankan film in the Sinhalese cinema.

== Cast ==
- Dhananjaya Siriwardena as Aladin
- Udari Warnakulasooriya as Princess
- Nethu Priyangika as Nidiya, princess's servant
- D.B. Gangodathenna as Mashoor Pasha
- Dilhara Rajapaksha as Fathima
- Bindu Bothalegama as Suleiman, palace guard
- Nimal Pallewatte as Ghost in the ring
- Senaka Titus Anthony as Ghost in the lamp
- Priyantha Mansilu as Hasan
- Rohitha Dias as Maha Amathi

== Songs ==
The film contains two songs.

No.	Title	Lyrics	Music	Singer(s)	Length
1.	"Kumariya Mage"	Ajith Mendis	Dr Ruwin Dias	Saman Lenin, Shantha Pieris
2.	"Gini Hulange Pipi"	Ajith Mendis	Dr Ruwin Dias	Sadew Santhula, Dunithi Kavinya, Janani Imathma, Bhanuka Seneviratne, Teran de Alwis
