= Natannethuwa Dinna =

- Theatrical release poster
- Sinhala: නටන්නැතුව දින්නා
- Directed by: Kalyana Chandrasekara
- Written by: Kalyana chandrasekera
- Produced by: A. Parister
- Starring: Bindu Bothalegama; Cletus Mendis; Rodney Warnakula
- Cinematography: Amith Suranga
- Edited by: Ruwan Chamara Ranasinghe
- Music by: Sarath Wickrama
- Production company: Sarasavi studio
- Distributed by: Rithma / C.E.L Board
- Release date: 11 March 2016
- Country: Sri Lanka
- Language: Sinhala

Natannethuwa Dinna (Sinhala: නටන්නැතුව දින්නා) is a 2016 Sri Lankan Sinhala comedy film directed by Kalyana Chandrasekara and produced by A. Parister. It stars Bindu Bothalegama and Roshan Pilapitiya in lead roles along with Rodney Warnakula and Cletus Mendis. Music composed by Sarath Wickrama. It is the 1245th Sri Lankan film in the Sinhala cinema.

== Cast ==
- Bindu Bothalegama as Veera / Sira
- Cletus Mendis as President
- Rodney Warnakula as Premayaa
- Roshan Pilapitiya as Nishan Porapitiya
- Madhi Panditharatne as Neela
- Ronnie Leitch as Gunda
- Milinda Perera as Jewelry owner
- Ariyasena Gamage as Wimale
- Dayasiri as Jailer
- Devinda as Police officer

== Soundtrack ==
No.	Title	Singer(s)	Length
1.	"Rock n Roll"	Jinger White
2.	"Ah Ha Warella"	Ronnie Leach, Rodney Warnakula
3.	"Ma Ha Sitha Yame"	Prabath Kelum, Gayathri Rajapakse
