= Dawala Pawura =

- Sinhala: ධවල පවුර
- Directed by: Luxman Arachchige
- Written by: A. Fransis Sooriya Arachchi
- Produced by: Laksara Films
- Starring: Luxman Arachchige; Chamila Nishanthi; Sunil Saliya Ranaweera
- Cinematography: Dinesh Kumara
- Edited by: M. S. Aliman
- Music by: Asokaa Peiris
- Release date: 21 January 2011
- Running time: 125 minutes
- Country: Sri Lanka
- Language: Sinhala

Dawala Pawura (Sinhala: ධවල පවුර; lit. 'The white wall') is a 2011 Sri Lankan Sinhala adult drama film directed by Luxman Arachchige and co-produced by Luxman Arachchige himself with Sunil Saliya Ranaweera for Laksara Films. It stars Luxman Arachchige and Chamila Nishanthi in lead roles along with Hyasinth Wijeratne and Sandun Wijesiri. Music composed by Asokaa Peiris. It is the 1151st Sri Lankan film in the Sinhala cinema.

== Cast ==
- Chamila Nishanthi as Maduwanthi
- Luxman Arachchige as Udara
- Sunil Saliya Ranaweera
- Clarice De Silva as Silvia
- Sandun Wijesiri as Dunuwila
- Hyasinth Wijeratne as Sandalatha
- Shelton Payagala as Professor
- Thilakarathna Liyanage as Wilfred
- Sunil Liyanarachchi as Sirisoma
- Achala Lakmali as Kaushalya
- Sunil Saliya Ranaweera as Malan
- Rohitha Mannage as Rathnayake
- Palitha Nanayakkara as Wickie
- Vije Hettiarachchi as Rangalla
- Kumara Ranepura as Kumara
