= Mahendra Perera =

Sri Lankan actor

Mahendra Perera මහේන්ද්‍ර පෙරේරා
- Born: 17 August 1956 (age 70); Colombo, Sri Lanka
- Education: Thurstan College, Colombo
- Occupations: Actor, Presenter, Dramatist
- Years active: 1982–present
- Spouse: Thakshila Damayanthi
- Children: 3
- Parents: Vincent Perera (father); Soma Weerasekera (mother)
- Awards: Best Actor; Best Supporting Actor

Mahendra Shrikantha Perera (born 17 August 1956: Sinhala: මහේන්ද්‍ර පෙරේරා), is an actor in Sri Lankan cinema, stage drama and television. One of the most influential actors in Sinhala cinema, Mahendra has performed from drama to comedy in many blockbuster films.

== Personal life ==
He was born on 17 August 1956 in Mount-Lavinia, Sri Lanka as the youngest of the family. His father Vincent Perera, was a store manager at the Browns, and his mother Soma Weerasekera, was a matron at several government hospitals. He has two older sisters, Priyanthi Damayanthi and Shivanthi Kalyani. He first studied at Highland College, Nugegoda. Later he went to Maharagama Vidyakara College and Thurstan College, Colombo.

He is married to Thakshila Damayanthi, daughter of Mr. Nandadasa who is a financial advisor. The couple has three sons.

== Career ==
During his life at Thurstan, he met a friend called Kalani Perera, who later became a violinist. They both studied music under the music teacher Yogananda Wijesundera where Mahendra learned violin, water wave, tabla and xylophone. After school life, he joined a rock band in Mount Lavinia and played guitar. When his father did not succeed his intentions, Mahendra ran away from home and planted potatoes with a cousin in Haputale. During this period, he met the writer and lecturer, Upul Shantha Sannasgala. Meanwhile, the father came to Haputale brought Mahendra back to Colombo.

After return home, he joined Dhamma Jagoda's theater classes and learned acting. However, after few monthns, he clashed with Dhamma saying it was boring only to learn acting in 'Sinhabahu' and 'Maname'. Then he went to a drama course conducted by Dr. Solomon Fonseka and learned the theatrical techniques introduced by the Russian playwright Konstain Stanislavsky. Meanwhile, his first stage play was Ahimi Jeevitha staged in Lionel Wendt. Mahendra met with Arisen Ahubudu who first introduced him to Gamini Fonseka. His maiden cinematic experience came through 1978 film Sakwithi Suwaya directed by Gamini Fonseka and played the role ‘Berty Malli’. Under Helena Lehthimaki, he followed a three-year course during which they did Punthila.

Then Mahendra played powerful roles in Shakespeare's plays Julius Caesar and Gimhane Reyaka Sihinayak produced by Tony Ranasinghe. During the same time, he acted in the blockbuster film Sagarayak Meda. He also appeared in several stage plays including Ath, Ahimi Jeevitha and Sergeant Nallathambi. His maiden television acting came through Tharadevi. Since then, he acted in the serials such as Sudu Saha Kaḷu, Niyan Ukussō, Dhavala Rāthriya, Diya Kæṭa Pahaṇa, Hadavila Sakmana, Daṇḍē Lū Gini, Diyasēna, Vesmuhuṇu and Golu Thaththa.

However his most notable appearances came through cinema, where he continued to be one of the most influential cinema actors in Sinhala cinema. He dominated many blockbusters such as Sihina Dēśayen, Asvæsuma, Bahubūthayō, Sudu Kaḷu, Arumōsam Væhi, Mille Soyā, Adḍress Nǣ, Kosthāpal Puñyasōma, 28 and Gindari. He won a merit award for the role in the serial Diyaketa Pahana. Apart from acting, Perera also worked as the art director in the film Julietge Bhumikawa and Pawuru Walalu. He was also the assistant director of the film Koti Waligaya.

=== Selected television serials ===
- Abuddassa Kalaya
- Amuthu Minissu
- Ath Kanda Lihiniya
- Bhavathra
- Charithayakata Paata Denna
- Dadakeli Arana
- Dande Lu Gini
- Deyyo Sakki
- Dhawala Kanya
- Dhavala Rathriya
- Diya Keta Pahana
- Diya Matha Ruwa
- Diyasena
- Duvili Maliga
- Ekama Raene Kurullo
- Gini Avi Saha Gini Keli
- Golu Thaththa (2016)
- Hadawila Sakmana
- Herda Sakshiya
- Hiru Thanivela
- Ingammaruwa
- Itu Devi Vimana
- Jeewithaya Dakinna
- Kampitha Vil
- Maama Haa Ma
- Mage Kaviya Mata Denna
- Mahamera Paamula
- Me Sonduru Piyapath
- Nethra Mangallaya
- Niyan Ukusso
- Pata Veeduru
- Pinkanda Simona
- Ralla Veralata Adarei
- Samartha
- Sanda Amawakai
- Sanda Nathi Reya
- Sasankara
- Satharadenek Senpathiyo
- Sathyaya
- Sisila Ima
- Star Sri lanka Histhanak
- Sudu Saha Kalu
- Sulanga Matha Mohothak (2013 - 2014)
- Thalaya Soyana Geethaya
- Thattu Gewal
- Uththamavi
- Wanawadule Wasanthaya
- Weda Hamine
- Yakada Pahanthira

== Filmography ==
Key
†	Denotes films that have not yet been released

Year	Film	Role	Ref.
1997	Visidela	Sumith	
1997	Gini Avi Saha Gini Keli	Sammy	
1998	Anthima Reya		
1998	Julietge Bhumikawa	Supun. also as art director.	
1999	Mandakini		
2000	Saroja	Sirisena	
2000	Sanda Yahanata		
2000	Anuragaye Ananthaya	Terrance	
2001	Aswesuma	Head hunter	
2001	Purahanda Kaluwara	Village officer	
2002	Bahubuthayo	Lanty	
2002	Mage Wam Atha	Photographer	
2002	Arumosam Wahi	Bindu	
2003	Thani Thatuwen Piyabanna	Mechanic	
2003	Sonduru Dadabima	Ranasinghe	
2003	Bheeshanaye Athuru Kathawak		
2003	Sudu Salu	Bandu	
2004	Mille Soya	Pradeep	
2004	Randiya Dahara	Kulatunga	
2005	Sulanga Enu Pinisa	Soldier	
2005	Sudu Kalu Saha Alu	Army Ajith	
2005	Asani Warsha	Patrick Bappa	
2008	Machan	Ruan	
2008	Heart FM	Media Manager	
2008	Siri Raja Siri	Gune, Sirimal's father	
2010	Bambara Walalla	Mel	
2010	Ira Handa Yata	Nimal	
2010	Thank You Berty	Sanda's father	
2010	How I Wonder What You Are		
2011	King Hunther	Hector	
2011	Gamani	Mahendra	
2012	Super Six	Madaya	
2012	Matha	Galariya	
2012	Kusa Pabha	Royal Servant	
2013	Bomba Saha Rosa	Gotta	
2013	Abhinikmana	Somadasa	
2014	Kosthapal Punyasoma	Kosthapal Punyasoma	
2014	Ko Mark No Mark	Prof. Amaraweera	
2015	Pravegaya	Mahen	
2015	Spandana	Mahendra Sami	
2015	Gindari	Lanty	
2015	Address Na	Chaplin	
2016	Hora Police	Seargent Suwandarathna / Tiger	
2016	Motor Bicycle	Manju	
2017	Sulanga Gini Aran	Human organ trafficker	
2017	28	Abasiri	
2017	Appata Siri	Mahamudalige Ranaweera / Suraweera	
2017	Kaala	Heen Kurutta Nilame	
2018	Vaishnavee	Simon	
2018	Punchi Andare	Anadare's Father	
2018	Davena Vihagun	Slaughter house owner	
2018	Athuru Mithuru Hari Apuru		
2019	Bhavatharana		
2019	Weli Pawuru	Sisira Ekanayake	
2019	President Super Star	Vijitha Mapalagama	
2022	Night Rider		
2022	Hithumathe Jeewithe	Raja	
2022	Gindari 2	Lanty	
2023	Vedi Nowadina Lamai		
2023	Dada Ima	Sunil	
2023	Kathuru Mithuru	Wilson 'barber'	
2023	Paradise	Inspector Sergeant Bandara	
2024	1970 Love Story		
2024	Sihinayaki Adare		
2024	Hora Uncle	Ranjith	
2024	Passport	notorious agent	
2024	Buffalo Travels		
2025	Theja	Ranjith Welivitiya	
2025	Maria	Willy 'Captain'	
TBA	Kondadeniye Hamuduruwo †		
TBA	Anora †		
TBA	Girivassipura †	Pilimathalawwe	
TBA	Ayyai Nangyi †		
TBA	Adventures of Ricky Deen †	Ricky Deen	
TBA	Kidnap †	Upali	
TBA	Number 9 †		
TBA	Abheetha †		
TBA	Missis †		

== Awards and accolades ==
He has won several awards at the local cinema, stage drama festivals and television festivals.

=== Sarasaviya Awards ===
Year	Nominee / work	Award	Result
2006	Randiya Dahara	Best Supporting Actor	Won

=== Presidential Film Awards ===
Year	Nominee / work	Award	Result
2006	Asani Warsha	Best Supporting Actor	Won
