= D. B. Gangodathenna =

Sri Lankan actor and comedian

D.B. Gangodathenna ඩී. බී. ගංගොඩතැන්න
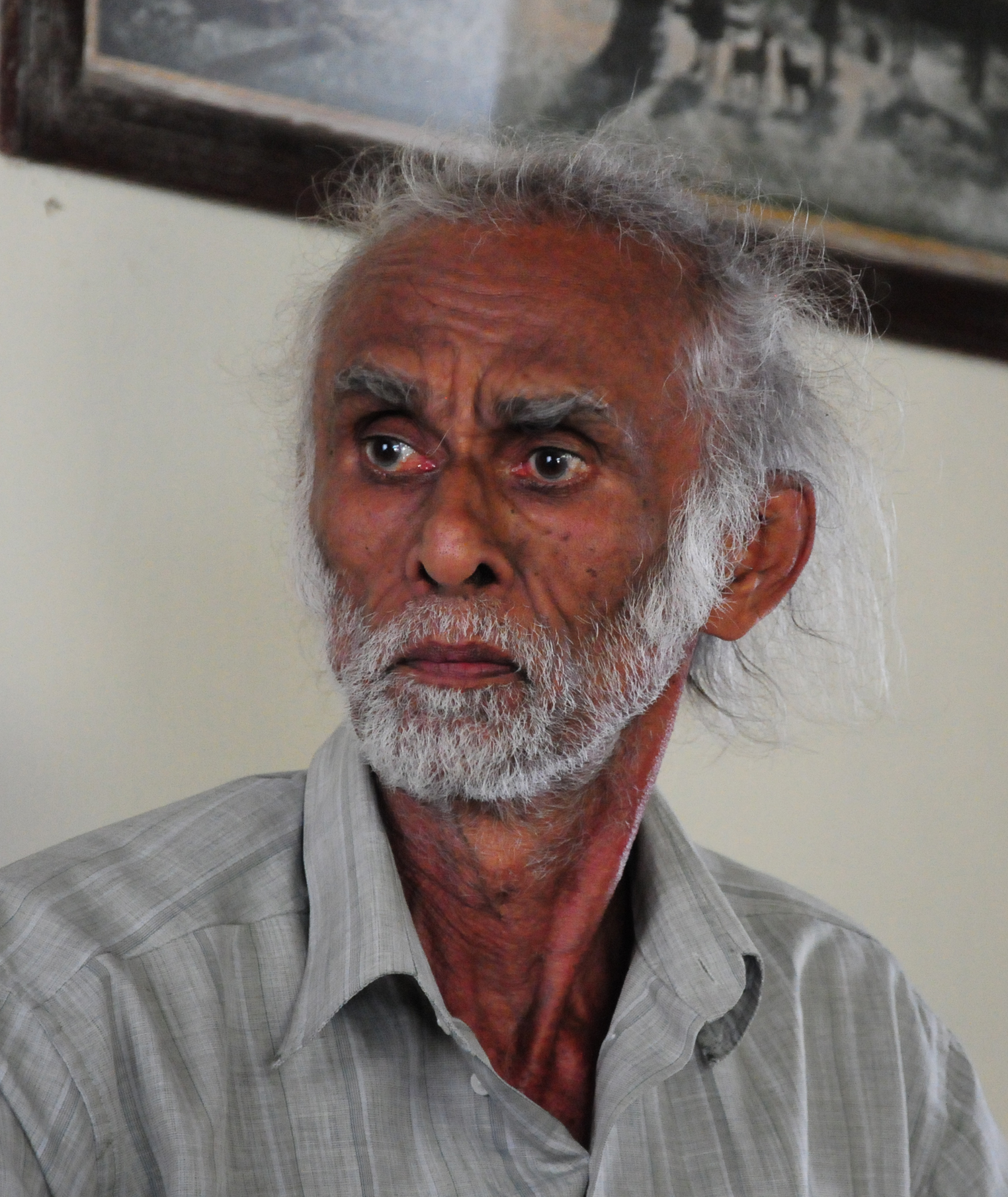
- Born: May 28, 1943 (age 83); Kandy, Sri Lanka
- Education: Dharmaraja College
- Occupation: Actor
- Years active: 2001–present

D.B. Gangodathenna (born May 28, 1943 as ඩී. බී. ගංගොඩතැන්නේ) [Sinhala]), is an actor in Sri Lankan cinema, stage drama and television. Gangodathenna has acted in supportive comedy roles, particularly in cinema.

== Acting career ==
Gangodathenna started his film career with Mathu Yam Dawasa back in 2001, directed by Dharmasena Pathiraja.

== Filmography ==
Key
†	Denotes films that have not yet been released

Year	Film	Role	Ref.
2001	Mathu Yam Dawasa		
2002	Parliament Jokes	Store Mudalali	
2002	Bahubuthayo	Interviewed villager	
2003	Yakada Pihatu	Manuja's mad stepfather	
2003	Sulang Kirilli	Rathi's father	
2004	Sooriya Arana	Uncle Peethara	
2004	Diya Yata Gindara	Communication store owner	
2005	One Shot	Doctor Kallepotha	
2008	Wada Bari Tarzan Mathisabayata	Gunda 'Daddy'	
2008	Aba	Astrologer	
2009	Leader		
2010	Mago Digo Dai	Mudiyanse	
2010	Ape Yalu Punchi Bhoothaya	Gurunnanse	
2011	Mahindagamanaya	Devil house chanter	
2011	Kiwwada Nahi Nokiwwada Nahi	Somasundaram's father	
2011	Ethumai Methumai		
2012	Super Six	Taddy	
2013	Raja Horu	Makka	
2014	Siri Daladagamanaya		
2014	Kosthapal Punyasoma	Bus thief victim	
2014	Kalpanthe Sihinayak		
2014	Api Marenne Na		
2014	Swaroopa		
2015	Mage Yalu Malu	Jayakody	
2015	Pravegaya	Bike shop owner	
2015	Lantin Singho		
2015	Address Na		
2015	My Name Is Bandu	Municipal tractor driver	
2015	Ho Gaana Pokuna		
2016	Sakkarang		
2016	Hora Police	Namal	
2016	Ran Dedunnak		
2016	Hero Nero		
2017	64 Mayam		
2018	Porisadaya	James	
2018	Yama Raja Siri	Police Constable	
2018	Aladin Saha Puduma Pahana	Mashoor Pasha	
2018	Kolamba Sanniya Returns	Man at shopping complex	
2018	Yalu Malu Yalu 2		
2018	Athuru Mithuru Hari Apuru		
2018	Davena Wihagun	Old man at brothel	
2019	Goree		
2019	Thiththa Aththa		
2019	Jaya Sri Amathithuma	drunken person	
2019	Reload	Doctor	
2019	Face to Face		
2021	Hathara Varan		
2023	Kathuru Mithuru	Old thin man in Barber shop	
2025	Kaasi Vaasi		
2025	Ice Cream		
2025	Bahuchithawadiya	Old man	
TBA	Edath Dinum Adath Dinum †		
TBA	Pampas †		
TBA	Nirvasthra †		
TBA	Housefull †		
TBA	Wessanthara Raja Dawasa †		
