= Hora Police =

- Sinhala: හොරා පොලිස්
- Directed by: Suranga De Alwis
- Written by: Suranga De Alwis
- Based on: Suranga De Alwis
- Produced by: Sangeetha Films
- Starring: Mahendra Perera; Priyantha Seneviratne; Gangu Roshana
- Cinematography: Thusitha Anuradha
- Edited by: Ruwan Weerasinghe
- Music by: Sarath de Alwis
- Distributed by: LFD Films
- Release date: 17 November 2016
- Country: Sri Lanka
- Language: Sinhala

Hora Police (Sinhala: හොරා පොලිස්) is a 2016 Sri Lankan Sinhala comedy film directed, produced, screenplay by Suranga De Alwis for Sangeetha Films. It stars Mahendra Perera in dual role along with Dhanuskha Iroshani and Gangu Roshana in supporting roles. Music composed by Sarath de Alwis. It is the 1252nd Sri Lankan film in the Sinhala cinema.

== Cast ==
- Mahendra Perera as Seargent Suwandarathna / Tiger
- Priyantha Seneviratne as Minister Gajasinha
- Ariyasena Gamage as DIG
- Gangu Roshana as Deepthi, Inspector of police (IP)
- Dhanuskha Iroshani as Pushpa, Suwandarathna's wife
- Samanthi Lanerolle as Susila, Suwandarathna 's mother
- Mark Samson as Lokke
- D.B. Gangodathenna as Namal
- Eardley Wedamuni as Superintendent of police (SP)
- Denuwan Senadhi as White
