= Damitha Saluwadana =

Sri Lankan actress

Damitha Saluwadana දමිතා සළුවඩන
- Born: Damitha Turlin Fernando; September 18, 1948; Colombo, Sri Lanka
- Died: November 27, 2015 (aged 67); Colombo
- Other name: Asilin
- Education: Karagampitiya Methodist School
- Occupations: Actress, Dubbing artist
- Years active: 1966–2015
- Spouse: Wasantha Saluwadana
- Children: 1
- Relatives: Don Sirisena

Damitha Turlin Fernando (born 18 September 1948 – died 27 November 2015 as දමිතා සළුවඩන) [Sinhala]), popularly known as Damitha Saluwadana, was an actress in Sri Lankan cinema, stage drama and television. She played "Asilin" in the television serial Kopi Kade. She had acted in more than 300 stage plays, 200 television serials and 25 films.

== Personal life ==
She was born on 18 September 1948 as the youngest child in a family with five siblings. She completed education from Karagampitiya Methodist School. Her elder sister's husband, Don Sirisena was a popular comedian in early Sinhala cinema. She was married to Wasantha Saluwadana and the couple had one daughter, Venushka. Venushka is married to Amila Prasad Silva. Damitha's cousin son Chanaka Fernando is also an actor.

Saluwadana suffered from diabetes for 29 years. When her diabetes was controlled by medication, her kidneys had unknowingly been a side effect. She died on 27 November 2015 at the age of 67. Her remains were kept in Boralesgamuwa Florists in Boralesgamuwa on 28 November 2015. Funeral took place on Thumbowila burial grounds.

== Career ==
At the age of 7 she started to study Manipuri, Kandyan and Low country at the school under Sirimathi Rasadari and Grayson Fernando. Her first stage play was Mulaawa produced by her elder brother, Cyril Fernando. Later, she was seen in the cast of King Elara in a drama by the Tower Hall Foundation.

In 1966, she made her cinema debut acting through the film Hangi Hora under the guidance of Rohini Jayakody at the age of 18 under the guidance of cousin Don Sirisena. Then in 1968, she started to act in stage plays Dasa Dahasak and Raththaran. She later joined the Wallis drama group and was a frequent actor in the Vesak dramas. During this period, she started to act in the plays Apuru Yaluwo and Yakada Sapaththu.

Later, Saluwadana has acted in many popular stage plays including, Siwamma Dhanapala, Sergeant Nallathambi, Baba Nona and Baisage Wadiya. Her maiden television acting came through Sudda Hami directed by Chandraratne Mapitigama. Often she was portrayed as a mother or aunt in cinema as well as in television.

She rendered his voice as a dubbing artist in many popular television serials such as Shanthi, Swabhiman, Rosa Achchi and Sujatha Diyaniya. She joined with Kopi Kade television serial in 1997. Her role as "Asilin" became highly popularized among the public and she was usually known by her character name rather than real name. She continued to act in the serial for 13 consecutive years until her death.

=== Selected television serials ===
- Denuwara Manike
- Diriya Doni
- Ethuma
- Hiru Kumari
- Hoduwawa
- Kadulla
- Keetaya
- Isuru Sangramaya
- Kopi Kade
- Neela Palingu Diya
- Nonavaruni Mahathvaruni
- Pabalu Paalama
- Sabanda Babanis
- Sara
- Subha Prabha
- Sundara Pemanis

== Filmography ==
Year	Film	Role	Ref.
1995	Aege Wairaya	Indrani's aunt	
1996	Naralowa Holman	Donna Isabella	
1997	Aege Wairaya 2		
1997	Ragaye Unusuma		
1997	Pemmal Mala		
1998	Mohothin Mohotha		
1999	Seetha Ra		
2000	Hansa Vilapaya		
2001	Kinihiriya Mal	Brothel handler	
2002	Bahubuthayo	Dewala chanter	
2002	Sathkampa	Mudalali's wife	
2002	Somy Boys	Bean's mother	
2003	Sudu Kaluwara	Arachchi's wife	
2005	Meedum Wasanthe		
2010	Sara		
2013	Ran Kevita 2	Sundari amma	
2013	Raja Horu		
2014	Parawarthana	Chandare's mother	
2015	Gindari	woman at clamor	
2015	Suhada Koka		
2015	My Name Is Bandu	Nanda	
2015	Singa Machan Charlie		
