= My Name Is Bandu =

My Name is Bandu
- Sinhala: මයි නේම් ඉස් බන්දු
- Directed by: Suranga de Alwis
- Written by: Suranga de Alwis
- Produced by: Suranga de Alwis
- Starring: Bandu Samarasinghe; Rodney Warnakula; Anusha Damayanthi; Roy de Silva
- Cinematography: Ayeshmantha Hettiarachchi
- Edited by: Pravin Jayaratne
- Music by: Sarath de Alwis
- Distributed by: LFD, MPI Theatres
- Release date: 30 October 2015
- Running time: 145 minutes
- Country: Sri Lanka
- Language: Sinhala
- Budget: 20 SL Millions

My Name is Bandu (Sinhala: මයි නේම් ඉස් බන්දු) is a 2015 Sri Lankan Sinhala comedy, family film directed by Suranga de Alwis and produced by Suranga de Alwis. It stars Bandu Samarasinghe, and Anusha Damayanthi in lead roles along with Rodney Warnakula, Roy de Silva and Mark Samson. Music for the film is done by Sarath de Alwis. The film is the 85th film of Bandu Samarasinghe. It is the 1239th Sri Lankan film in the Sinhala cinema.

== Cast ==
- Bandu Samarasinghe as Bandula / Saliya
- Anusha Damayanthi as Sanju
- Rodney Warnakula as Raju
- Ariyasena Gamage as Dhanasiri Mudalali
- Roy de Silva as Sinhabahu Abeywardena
- Mark Samson as Assistant
- Ronnie Leitch as OIC
- Premadasa Vithanage as Martin Kapuwa
- Vishwa Lanka as Vishwa
- Denuwan Senadhi as Punyasoma / Pusa
- Rashmi Sumanasekara as Anju
- Upali Keerthisena as Naattami
- D.B. Gangodathenna as Municipal tractor driver
- Damitha Saluwadana

== Soundtrack ==
No.	Title	Singer(s)	Length
1.	"Somiye Inne"	Rukman Asitha
2.	"Pawi Enu Mena"	Bandu Samarasinghe, Uresha Ravihari
3.	"Mal Manamali"	Uresha Ravihari, Buddhika Ushan

== Distribution ==
The film successfully screened in E.A.P circuit cinemas from its distribution date in Colombo. It was screened more than 150 days in many cinemas.
