= Priyantha Seneviratne =

Sri Lankan actor and comedian

Priyantha Seneviratne ප්‍රියන්ත සෙනවිරත්න
- Born: Thennakumbura Amarakoon Rajapaksa Wasala Mohottige Priyantha Seneviratne; 5 March 1963 (age 63); Kandy, Sri Lanka
- Occupations: Actor, comedian
- Years active: 1986–present
- Spouse: Kanchana Kariyapperuma (m. 2004)
- Children: 2

Thennakumbura Amarakoon Rajapaksa Wasala Mohottige Priyantha Seneviratne (ප්‍රියන්ත සෙනවිරත්න; born 5 March 1963), popularly known as Priyantha Seneviratne, is an actor in Sri Lankan cinema, stage drama, and television. He is best known for his roles in the television serials Uncle Sam, Pabalu, Podi Mama, and Isuru Bhavana.

== Personal life ==
He was born on 5 March 1963 in Thannekumbura, Kandy, Sri Lanka as the third child in the family. He has one elder sister, one elder brother and one younger sister. In his little age, he was suffered with terrible asthma, so the family transferred to Colombo.

He is married to Kanchana Kariyapperuma, a music teacher. He met Kanchana during the stage play Arundathi and then from Saranga Nawen Awith. The couple has one daughter, Pujani Manikya, who was born on 12 October 2005 and one son, Chirath Gagan, born on 28 September 2007.

== Acting career ==
He entered drama career with the stage play Makulu Del staged in 1986 produced by Jagath Muthukumarana. At that time, he was a first year student at technical college, Werahera. Then he joined with Rupavahini Corporation for the children's program Kathandara Pituwa. He produced the program Balan Sabe Muthure telecast by Rupavahini. He also produced the stage play, Minisa.

Seneviratne started his film career with a major role in 2004 comedy film, Clean Out directed by Roy de Silva. Some of his popular cinema acting came through Sikuru Hathe, Ethumai Methumai and Super Six.

In 2007, he won the award for the Best Actor in a comedy role at Raigam Tele'es for the role "Sumanapala" in television serial Isuru Bhavana. In 2017, he won the Best Comedian award at Presidential Film Festival for the role in Paha Samath.

He hosts the program 4 Kendare with Mihira Sirithilaka as well as Hiru Super Dance with Shalani Tharaka and Kavinga Perera, both telecast on Hiru TV.

=== Notable theater works ===
- Comedy Buddy
- Makulu Del
- Minisa
- Rookada Rajje
- Saranga Nawen Awith

=== Notable television serials ===
- Akuru Maki Na
- Dekada Kada
- Desa Matha Mohothak
- Hitha Langa Hinahuna
- Isuru Bhavana
- Kiyadenna Adare Tharam
- Medi Sina
- Nil Mal Viyana
- Oba Enna Awith Yanna
- On Ataka Nataka
- Pabalu
- Pini
- Podi Mama
- Rantharu
- Saranganaa
- Sihina Viman
- Somibara Jaramara
- Uncle Sam

== Filmography ==
Key
†	Denotes films that have not yet been released

Year	Film	Role	Ref.
2004	Clean Out	Rocky	
2007	Mr Dana Rina		
2007	Sikuru Hathe	Transgender	
2009	Sir Last Chance	Detective	
2010	Tikiri Suwanda	Gurunnanse	
2011	Ethumai Methumai	Kusumsiri	
2012	Super Six	Commentator Priyantha	
2015	Suhada Koka	Minister	
2016	Hora Police	Minister Gajasinha	
2017	Paha Samath	Bus conductor	
2019	President Super Star	Priyantha Alawirathna	
2023	Kathuru Mithuru	Samson's assistant	
2024	Passport		
2025	Kaasi Vaasi	Driver Rathna	
2025	Elada Braa		
2026	The Wife		
TBA	Amuthu Gurukamak †		
TBA	Amuthu 3k †		
TBA	Sargent Punchisoma †	Sargent Punchisoma	
