= Rodney Warnakula =

Sri Lankan actor, comedian, singer, and dubbing artist

Rodney Warnakula රොඩ්නි වර්ණකුල
- Born: Warnakula Patabandige Rodney Priyantha Perera; 24 April 1961 (age 65); Ja-Ela, Sri Lanka
- Occupations: Dramatist, Actor, Singer, Comedian, Dubbing artiste, Commentator
- Years active: 1981–present
- Spouse: Erani Warnakula
- Children: Harshani Prasangika; Samadhi Upekshika; Eron Lakdeepa

Warnakula Patabandige Rodney Priyantha Perera (born 24 April 1961 as රොඩ්නි වර්ණකුල [Sinhala]), popularly known as Rodney Warnakula, is a Sri Lankan actor, comedian, singer, and dubbing artist.

== Family ==
Warnakula was born on 24 April 1961 in Ja-Ela, as the son of Aloy Warnakula, an actor, and Annie Jayakodi, a housewife. He made his stage debut in Lucien Bulathsinhala’s 1981 drama Tharavo Igilethi. He is married to Erani Warnakula. They have two daughters and a son. His elder daughter Harshani Prasangika is a dancing teacher, his second daughter is Samadhi Upekshika and his youngest is his son, Eron Lakdeepa.

== Career ==
In 1980, The Tower Foundation conducted a drama course with lecturers from Shanti Niketan, India, including Warnakula. Later one of the lecturers in the course, Anula Bulathsinhala invited him to participate for the stage play Tharavo Igilethi.

Warnakula has performed in over fifty stage plays, fifteen teleplays and twenty films, in addition to being a popular television actor. His most popular television acting came from Bodima and Nonavaruni Mahathvaruni. He also hosted Raigam Game Show several times which was telecasted on ITN. He and actor Rodney Fraser appeared together in the comedy series Two Rodneys, which was telecast on Sirasa TV. Warnakula has also enjoyed a lengthy singing career.

On 20 October 2011, Warnakula organized a musical night Sanda Eliyen Ada, to celebrate his 30 years of acting career. On that day, he launched his new music DVD, and the show was celebrated at the New Hall of Royal College, Colombo. On 18 May 2018, Warnakula organized a singing concert named Three Faces along with Kumara Thirimadura and Saman Lenin to celebrate his 37 years of stage drama career. The show will be held at the BMICH.

In 2020 during the CoVID-19 quarantine curfew period, his Facebook account has been hacked. Then, his Facebook friends and fans received messages asking for money by saying that he has a critical money emergency. However, Warnakula got informed about the hacker and sent messages not to give money. Later Warnakula made a new Facebook page. To celebrate his 40 years of drama career, he wrote his autobiography titled "Roddage Warna Kulaya".

=== Selected television serials ===
- Alli and Galli
- Bodima
- Dara Garage
- Dese Disnaya
- E Brain
- Game Viththi
- Laa Sanda Pamula
- Love You Boss
- Naana Kamare
- Nonavaruni Mahathvaruni
- On Ataka Nataka
- Raja Kaduwa
- Satakapata
- Sayaweni Patumaga
- Sedona
- Sikuru Awith
- Vinoda Samayan
- Wada Bari Daasa

=== Selected stage dramas ===
- Gajaman Puwatha
- Gondola
- Naribana with Jasaya Saha Lenchina
- Madhura Javanika
- Minisa
- Naribana
- Saaranga Nawen Awith
- Sakisanda Madala
- Sudu Redi Horu
- Tharavo Igilethi

== Filmography ==
Key
†	Denotes films that have not yet been released

Year	Film	Role	Ref.
2002	Bahubuthayo	Bunty	
2004	Clean Out	Wickie	
2007	Ran Kevita	Devil	
2007	Sikuru Hathe	Sirimal	
2009	Sir Last Chance	Detective	
2009	Sinasuna Adaren	Lara	
2010	Tikiri Suwanda	Suran	
2011	Ethumai Methumai	Bothal Sira	
2012	Wassane Senehasa	Siripala	
2012	Super Six	commentator Rodney	
2013	Peeter One	Waiter Jonty	
2013	Seetha Man Awa	Gayida	
2014	Supiri Andare	Salman Khan	
2015	Gindari	Bunty	
2015	Suhada Koka	Sumanasiri	
2015	My Name Is Bandu	Raju	
2016	Natannethuwa Dinna	Premayaa	
2017	Ali Kathawa	Kinnara leader	
2019	Sikuru Yogaya	Piyadasa	
2019	President Super Star	multiple roles	
2022	Gindari 2	Bunty	
2023	Kathuru Mithuru	Wilson's assistant	
2024	Weerya		
2024	Jobless Douglas	Douglas	
2025	Kaasi Vaasi	Pinthu	
2025	Elada Braa		
2026	Abheetha		
TBA	Ela Dabala †	Gnanapala	
TBA	Sargent Punchisoma †	Punchisoma's friend	

== Discography ==
=== Solo Tracks ===
No.	Title	Length
1.	"Apa Koheda Me Yanne"	01.48
2.	"Araliya Uyane"	04.08
3.	"Banandiye Mage"	03.05
4.	"Bodoskiya Mage Bodoskiya"	02.33
5.	"Dangara Waliga" (Cartoon theme song)	02.01
6.	"Demassino" (with Bandula Wijeweera)	02.15
7.	"Dugiyane Ahapalla"	03.50
8.	"Galkiriyagama Awudin"	03.59
9.	"Giya Hakurata"	01.46
10.	"Handannepa Handannepa"	02.48
11.	"Hima Giri Arane"	03.53
12.	"Ira Handath Nagei" (with various artists)	03.20
13.	"Iti Pilimayak Wage"	02.08
14.	"Kakulu Sahal Pitiyenda"	02.20
15.	"Kanden Panala"	03.33
16.	"Kaanuwe Ipadila" (Mee Pura Wasiyo stage drama song)
17.	"Kavikara Hadakara Katakariye"	02.24
18.	"Kehel Malak Kehel Kotuwe"	03.26
19.	"Malmada Biso Ithin"	03.45
20.	"Neela Chanchala Dasa"	03.45
21.	"Iguru Paan Malliya" (Cartoon theme song)	01.27
22.	"Ohelage Pihiten" (with Granville Rodrigo)	01.39
23.	"Samanmali Mage Mali" (Sikuru Hathe film song)	04.14
24.	"Onna Ithin Api Enawa"	02.56
25.	"Peenanna Wage" (with Walter Fernando)	04.37
26.	"Porakana Lokaya"	03.24
27.	"Rathu Hatte Palal"	02.24
28.	"Sawan Yoma Asanne" (with Anton Jude)	02.41
29.	"Sawimath Kala Daruwan"	04.55
30.	"Siri Sangadasa Mahathmaya"	03.48
31.	"Siriyawi Nubawa Mama"	03.26
32.	"Sithumina Obai"	04.13
33.	"Sundara Me Ranga"	02.06
34.	"Sundara Watha Numba"	03.03
35.	"Sundari"
36.	"Swarna Sanda Bondawee"	04.53
37.	"Thagi Boga"	02.02
38.	"Yaluwo Maluwo Yaluwo"	02.35
39.	"Yami Yanta Den Mama"	03.42
40.	"Yasa Isuru" (Ratu Hattakari Stage drama song)	03.21
41.	"Daana Sellam" (Suhada Koka film song)	03.54
42.	"Ennako Gannako"	03.06
43.	"Nawen Apu"
44.	"Palagantiya"
45.	"Pani Kurullo (theme song of Okkoma Hondatai teledrama)"
46.	"Dannawada Kauda Loke (Film song of Sir Last Chance with Vijaya Nandasiri and Anton Jude)"
47.	"Bodima Bodima (theme song of Hulan Gedara teledrama)"
