= List of Sri Lankan films of the 2020s =

This is a list of films produced in Sri Lanka in the 2020s.

== 2020 ==
Cinemas in Sri Lanka have been closed since the third week of March due to the corona epidemic. Then, cinema halls follows audiences using hygienic strategies. Cinema halls were reopened on 27 June 2020. Movie theaters were officially closed for 183 days due to the Corona epidemic. However in early October 2020, all the cinema halls were closed due to second COVID-19 wave emerged with Minuwangoda and Divulapitiya cluster.

| Title | Director | Cast | Genre | Notes |
|---|---|---|---|---|
2020
| Tsunami | Somaratne Dissanayake | Niranjani Shanmugaraja, Darshan Dharmaraj, Himali Sayurangi, Bimal Jayakody, Giriraj Kaushalya, Kumara Thirimadura | Disaster drama | Released on January 16. |
| Nim Him | Mitchell Fonseka | Gangu Roshana, Milinda Madugalla, Janak Premalal, Kumari Munasinghe, W. Jayasiri, Gihan Fernando, Sampath Tennakoon, Roshan Pilapitiya | Romantic drama | Released on February 6. |
| The Horn | Sameera Wakwella | Kalhara Wakwella, Teena Shanell, Dhananjaya Siriwardena, Christien Gunawardana, Roshan Pilapitiya | Horror | Released on February 7. |
| Suparna | Sujeewa Priyal Yaddehige | Duleeka Marapana, Dinakshie Priyasad, Ashan Dias, Darshan Dharmaraj, Janak Premalal, Veena Jayakody, Kalana Gunasekara, Wilson Gunaratne | Fantasy thriller | Released on February 14. |
| Seda Mawathe | Harsha Udakanda | Anuj Ranasinghe, Damitha Abeyratne, Harshi Anjumala, Thusitha Ranaweera, Cletus Mendis, Ryan Van Rooyen | Action thriller | Released on February 20. |
| Eethalaya | Nalaka Vithanage | Kelum Aryan, Rex Kodippili, Shyam Fernando, Gayathri Dias, Shehani Perera, Chamathka Lakmini, Dharmapriya Dias | Action thriller | Released on March 5. |
| Avilenasului | Chinthana Dharmadasa | Shyam Fernando, Samanalee Fonseka, Hemasiri Liyanage, Kumara Thirimadura, Priyantha Sirikumara | Psychological thriller | Released on March 13. |
| The Newspaper | Sarath Kothalawala; Kumara Thirimadura | Sarath Kothalawala, Kumara Thirimadura, Dharmapriya Dias, Pubudu Chathuranga, Gihan Fernando, Shyam Fernando | Comedy drama | Released on July 3. |
| Soosthi | Kushan Weeraratne | Kalana Gunasekara, Samanalee Fonseka, W. Jayasiri, Maureen Charuni, Disni Rajapakse | Drama | Released on July 17. |
| Sheleena | Chandana Edirisinghe; Pujitha Gunathilake | Dineth de Silva, Amanda Silva, Anuj Ranasinghe, Jeewan Kumaranatunga, Veena Jayakody, Rohan Wijethunga | Crime detective | Released on August 21. |
| Paangshu | Visakesa Chandrasekaram | Nita Fernando, Nadee Kammellaweera, Jagath Manuwarna, Nilmini Buwaneka, Grace Ariyawimal | Drama | Released on August 21. |
| Rookada Panchi | Vindana Ariyawansa; Kalpana Ariyawansa | Jackson Anthony, Kushenya Fonseka, Lakshika Deshan, Umali Thilakarathne, Dhananjaya Siriwardena, Dilhani Ekanayake, Malini Fonseka | Children's drama | Released on September 24. |
| Miss Jenis | Susiran De Silva | Jayalath Manoratne, Giriraj Kaushalya, Duleeka Marapana, Roshan Ranawana, Jayalal Rohana, Udari Perera, Kumara Thirimadura | Comedy drama | Released on September 25. |

== 2021 ==
Under strict guidelines, cinema halls were reopened from 1 January 2021. However, from 2 May onwards, film halls were closed again until further notice due to third COVID-19 wave. In July 2021, the Cinematographers' Association has announced that the closed cinemas will reopen from July 16, 2021, following a discussion with President Gotabhaya Rajapaksa on July 8, approval was given to reopen cinemas.

| Title | Director | Cast | Genre | Notes |
|---|---|---|---|---|
2021
| Aale Corona | Sanjaya Nirmal | Jehan Appuhamy, Dishni Rajapaksa, Wasantha Vittachchi, Deepani Silva, Buddhika Jayaratne | Family drama | Released on January 7. |
| Hathara Varam | Chathura Perera | Chathura Perera, Pubudu Chathuranga, Kumara Thirimadura, Bandula Wijeweera, Rajitha Hiran, Teddy Vidyalankara | Comedy | Released on January 29. |
| Apata Sadunu Ape Lokaya | Srilal Priyadeva | Menaka Rajapakse, Nehara Pieris, Rajiv Nanayakkara, Pankaja Ipalawatte, Lakshmi Bogoda, Thilina Lakmal | Children's adventure | Released on February 14. |
| Colombo | Asama Liyanage | Hemal Ranasinghe, Dharmapriya Dias, Kumara Thirimadura, Jehan Appuhamy, Rukmal Nirosh, Shanika Niroshi | Thriller drama | Released on March 18. |
| Wassane Sihinaya | Nihal Sanjaya | Sanath Gunathilake, Kanchana Mendis, Roshan Pilapitiya, Dayananda Jayawardana, Cletus Mendis, Nilanthi Dias, Manjula Thilini | Drama | Released on March 25. |
| Kabaddi | Harsha Udakanda | Amila Karunanayake, Senali Fonseka, Sriyantha Mendis, Darshan Dharmaraj, Damitha Abeyratne, Rajitha Hiran, Ananda Wickramage | Action, thriller | Released on April 16. |
| Nihada Sewaneli | Sunil Premarathna | Pubudu Chathuranga, Roshan Ranawana, Kumara Thirimadura, Harith Wasala, Sarath Chandrasiri, Tharuka Wanniarachchi, Mashi Siriwardane | Horror | Released on November 11. |
| Ginimal Pokuru | Udayakantha Warnasuriya | Isuru Lokuhettiarachchi, Chulakshi Ranathunga, Charith Abeysinghe, Ananda Kumara Unnehe, Kumara Wanduressa, Dilrufa Shanaz | Adult romantic | Released on December 3. |
| Bhavatharana | Devinda Kongahage | Malini Fonseka, Sriyantha Mendis, Mahendra Perera, Roshan Ravindra, Roshan Pilapitiya, Chandika Nanayakkara, Darshan Dharmaraj | Drama | Released on December 3. |
| Kawuruth Danne Na | Bennett Rathnayake | Bimal Jayakody, Sangeetha Weeraratne, Udari Warnakulasooriya, Lucky Dias, Kumara Thirimadura, Buddhika Jayaratne | Action thriller | Released on December 22. |
| Jangi Hora | Somaratne Dissanayake | Pubudu Chathuranga, Dilhani Ekanayake, Chinthaka Kulathunga, Buddhi Randeniya | Adult drama | Released on December 23. |
| Puththi Ketta Manitharellam | Raj Sivaraj | Aravindan, Athi, Sathiyajith, Sabil Raaj, Thilakshan, Kanna, Sinthuja, Ithayaraj, Kokulan | Drama, thriller | Released on December 24. Only Tamil film in 2021. |

== 2022 ==
| Title | Director | Cast | Genre | Notes |
|---|---|---|---|---|
2022
| Alborada | Asoka Handagama | Luis Romero, Anne Solen Hatte, Dominic Keller, Nimaya Harris, Malcolm Machado, Rithika Kodithuwakku, Thusitha Laknath | Romantic, biographical | Released on February 14. |
| MonaLisa | Eranga Senarathna | Buddhika Jayarathne, Amila Karunanayake, Madushani Wickramasinghe, Sulochana Weerasinghe, Susanga Kahadawalarachchi | Romantic drama | Released on February 18. |
| Ashawari | Theja Iddamalgoda | Hemal Ranasinghe, Ishanka Jahanvi, Jayalath Manoratne, Jayani Senanayake, Saranga Disasekara, Semini Iddamalgoda | Romantic drama | Released on March 3. |
| Rashmi | Preethiraj Weeraratne | Upeksha Swarnamali, Pubudu Chathuranga, Akalanka Ganegama, Lucky Dias, Rajitha Hiran, Cletus Mendis, Wilson Karu | Drama | Released on March 18. |
| Happy Birthday | Aruna Jayawardena | Dilhani Ekanayake, Tashi Kalidasa, Yohani Hansika, Isuru Lokuhettiarachchi, Surya Dayaruwan, Randika Goonetileke | Mystery thriller | Released on March 24. |
| The Game | Suranga de Alwis | Ranjan Ramanayake, Janith Wickramage, Wasantha Kumaravila, Buddhika Jayaratne, Dhananjaya Siriwardena, Sriyantha Mendis | Action thriller | Released on June 16. |
| Second Show | A.T. Gnanam | Ajmal Ameer, Pallavi Subhash, Hemal Ranasinghe, Vidya Pradeep, Akshata Sonawane, Pooja Mondal | Horror thriller | Released on July 8. |
| Night Rider | Kasun Pathirana | Kalana Gunasekara, Yureni Noshika, W. Jayasiri, Mahendra Perera, Ananda Kumaraunnehe, Damayanthi Fonseka | Thriller | Released on July 29. |
| Ae | Eranga Senaratne | Yash Weerasinghe, Umeshi Wickramasinghe, Darshan Dharmaraj, Manel Wanaguru, Chalani Balasuriya, Dilhani Ekanayake | Drama | Released on August 12. The film was released only through online platform "www.cinemaceylon.com" and is the first Sinhala film with a single letter title. |
| CineMa | Kapila Sooriyarachchi | Shyam Fernando, Vihanga Sooriyarachchi, Nayanathara Wickramarachchi, Douglas Ranasinghe, Robin Fernando, Bimal Jayakody | Drama | Released on September 2. |
| Piyabanna Ayeth | Shirley Samarasinghe | Kalana Gunasekara, Chamatka Lakmali, Kalpa Munasinghe, Pokurumali Fernando, Marcus Fernando | Romantic drama | Released on September 9. |
| Hithumathe Jeewithe | Chrishantha Manamperi | Dineth de Silva, Mahendra Perera, Kumara Thirimadura, Jayani Senanayake, Mariyon Weththsinghe, Priyankara Rathnayake | Crime thriller | Released on September 15. |
| Praana | Sanjaya Nirmal | Shyam Fernando, Darshan Dharmaraj, Niranjani Shanmugaraja, Nita Fernando, King Ratnam, Tray Hicks | Historical drama | Released on October 7. |
| Adaraneeya Prarthana | Wasawa Baduge | Rahul Warawitage, Nethmi Roshel, Shanudrie Priyasad, Mihirangi Hettiarachchi, Nimesh Weeranga, Pavithra Wickramasinghe | Romance Musical | Released on November 4. |
| Ruhire | Najini Dikkovita | Roshan Ranawana, Paboda Sandeepani, Maheshi Madusanka, Vishva Lanka | Horror romance | Released on November 17. |
| Ran Kolla | Sumith Rathnayake | Okitha Damsath, Jayalath Manoratne, Iranganie Serasinghe, Chandani Seneviratne, Geetha Kanthi Jayakody, Hemasiri Liyanage | Drama | Released on November 18 |
| Gindari 2 | Udayakantha Warnasuriya | Paboda Sandeepani, Mahendra Perera, Rodney Warnakula, Richard Manamudali, Chulakshi Ranathunga, Srinath Maddumage | Comedy horror | Released on December 1 |

== 2023 ==
| Title | Director | Cast | Genre | Notes |
|---|---|---|---|---|
2023
| Gaadi | Prasanna Vithanage | Dinara Punchihewa, Sajitha Anthony, Ravindra Randeniya, Shyam Fernando, Iranganie Serasinghe, Damayanthi Fonseka | Historical drama | Released on January 20. |
| Gajaman | Chanaka Perera | Suneth Chithrananda, Gaminda Priyaviraj, Dasun Pathirana, Yureni Noshika, Paboda Sandeepani | Comedy animation | Released on January 20. It is the first 3D animation movie using motion capture technology in Sri Lanka. |
| Vedi Nowadina Lamai | Indika Ferdinando | Kalana Gunasekara, Anusaya Subasinghe, Jayalath Manoratne, Hemasiri Liyanage, Dayadeva Edirisinghe, Mahendra Perera | Children's drama | Released on February 16. |
| Thattu Deke Iskole | Lalith Rohitha Edirisinghe | Jagath Chamila, Damitha Abeyratne, Manjula Kumari, Nayana Hettiarachchi, Priyantha Sirikumara, Sudam Katukithule , Anjalee Liyanage | Children's drama | Released on February 17. |
| Yaaluwoda? Yaaluida? | Dilshara Jayamanna | Shereen Willis, Eraj Gunawardena, Dhanu Sinnathambi, Saranga Disasekara, Yureni Noshika, Dinakshie Priyasad, Kumara Thirimadura | Romantic drama | Released on March 10. |
| Viyasiduru | Prabhath Agampodi | Kalana Gunasekara, Shalani Tharaka, Lakshman Mendis, Thumindu Dodantenna, Dharmapriya Dias, Sanjeeva Dissanayake | Drama | Released on March 23. It is the first Sri Lankan film produced by a university. |
| Uthuru Sulanga | Chamara Janaraj Peiris | Eranga Jeewantha, Kavindya Dulshani, Sriyantha Mendis, Dilhani Ekanayake, Sanath Gunathilake, Meena Kumari, Rohana Beddage | Drama | Released on April 29, 2021 only in Liberty Cinema. Island wide release on 24 March 2023. |
| Vellinattukkaasu | Sasikaran Yo | Darian, Vidhursan, Poorvika, Remo Nisha, Jeniston, Sabesan | Drama | Released on March 26. |
| Saho | Ariyaratne Athugala | Dasun Pathirana, Dinara Punchihewa, Biyanka Amarasinghe, Harshi Anjumala, Sonduru Lokupothagama | Drama | Released on April 7. |
| Abhisheka | Sripali Hettiarachchi | Jeewan Kumaranatunga, Dulani Anuradha, Mihira Sirithilaka, Nanda Wickrama, Ariyasena Gamage, Srimali Fonseka | Drama | Released on April 7. |
| Yugathra | Channa Perera | Channa Perera, Asanki De Silva, Mashi Siriwardena, Sanath Gunathilake, Lakshman Mendis, Nadeeka Gunasekara. | Romance | Released on April 20. |
| Dada Ima | Dr. Naomal Perera | Swarna Mallawarachchi, Jackson Anthony, Mahendra Perera, Akhila Dhanuddara | Drama thriller | Released on April 28. |
| Deweni Yuddhaya | V.Sivadasan | Pubudu Chathuranga, Udari Warnakulasooriya, Dilhani Ekanayake | Drama | Released on May 4. |
| Ksheera Sagaraya Kalabina | Prof. Sunil Ariyaratne | Jackson Anthony, Hemal Ranasinghe, Udari Warnakulasooriya, Lucien Bulathsinhala, Sarath Kothalawala, Kumara Thirimadura | Fantasy romance | Released on May 18. |
| Guththila | Sanath Abeysekera | Edward Jayakody, Akhila Dhanuddhara, Chulakshi Ranathunga, Yashoda Wimaladharma, Sanath Gunathilake | Musical fantasy | Released on June 1. |
| Midunu Vishwaya | Jayantha Chandrasiri | Uddika Premarathna, Udari Warnakulasooriya, Buddhika Jayaratne, Chulakshi Ranathunga, Sriyantha Mendis, Kusum Renu | Drama | Released on June 11. |
| Visangamanaya | Ranjan Prasanna | Ashan Dias, Samanalee Fonseka, Semini Iddamalgoda, Udith Abeyratne, Douglas Ranasinghe | Drama | Released on July 7. |
| Sirimavo | Anoma Rajakaruna | none | Documentary | Released on July 21. |
| Kadira Divyaraja | Sunil Ariyaratne | Samar Vermani, Sonakshi Rawat, Nadeepa Ranasinghe, Jagath Chamila, Vinu Udani Siriwardhana | Fantasy Historical | Released on August 3. |
| Lockdown | Sunil Premarathna | Roshan Ranawana, Chulakshi Ranathunga, Kumara Thirimadura, Meena Kumari, Kusal Maduranga, Dhananji Tharuka | Thriller | Released on August 18. |
| Soppana Sundhari | Mathavan Maheswaran | Niranjani Shanmugaraja, Kajanan Kailainathan, Joel Krish, Naresh Nagendran, Mathavan Maheswaran, Tanushan Chelavanathan | Drama | Released on August 25. |
| Kathuru Mithuru | Giriraj Kaushalya | Jayalath Manoratne, Mahendra Perera, Rodney Warnakula, Priyantha Seneviratne, Rasanjana Nandasiri, Sandani Hettiarachchi | Comedy | Released on September 22. |
| Ahasin Wetei | Vimukthi Jayasundara | Thusitha Laknath, Kaushalya Fernando, Huang Lu | Comedy | Released on September 22. |
| 800 | M.S. Sripathy | Madhur Mittal, Mahima Nambiar, Narain, King Ratnam, Nassar, Vadivukkarasi | Biographical sport | Released on October 6. This is the first film created for a Sri Lankan sportsman. |
| Aasu | Sanjeewa Pushpakumara | Udari Warnakulasooriya, Shyam Fernando, Dinara Punchiheva, Chandani Seneviratne, Somaratne Dissanayake | Drama | Released on October 13. |
| Kandak Sema | Asoka Athaudahetti; Tao Nashimoto | Nirosha Perera, Jun Etoh, Ayako Kobayashi, Bimal Jayakody, Dineth De Silva, Chandani Seneviratne | Romantic drama | Released on November 2. |
| Munnel | Visakesa Chandrasekaram | Sivakumar Lingeswaran, Kamala Sri Mohan Kumar, Thurkka Magendran, Gowtham Sharma, Dharu Baalan | Drama | Released on November 3. |
| Sri Wickrama | Mohan Niyaz | Akhila Dhanuddara, Sriyantha Mendis, Chulakshi Ranathunga, Shyam Fernando, Roshan Pilapitiya | Historical | Released on November 10. |
| Rahas Kiyana Kandu | Jagath Manuwarna | Jagath Manuwarna, Dharmapriya Dias, Sarath Kothalawala, Sampath Jayaweera, Kalana Gunasekara | Drama Thriller | Released on November 17. |
| Swara | Sanjaya Nirmal | Nita Fernando, W. Jayasiri, Damitha Abeyratne, Anusha Rajapaksa, Sachini Ayendra, Jeewan Kumaranatunga | Medical drama | Released on December 1. |
| Nattami Army | Devinda Kongahage | Amitta Weerasinghe, Jayani Senanayake, Kumudu Nishantha, Sanath Wimalasiri, Mihira Sirithilaka | Action drama | Released on December 14. |
| Ape Principal | Chris Antony | Dilhani Ekanayake, Roger Seneviratne, Jagath Chamila, Shyam Fernando, Rukshanthi Perera, Chaminda Batukotuwa | Drama | Released on December 15. |
| Rider | Rajitha Hiran | Roshan Ranawana, Sanath Gunathilake, Anuj Ranasinghe, Chami Senanayake, Sarath Kulanga, Chilly Thilanka | Action thriller | Released on December 15. |
| Meka Puduma Kathawak | Srilal Priyadeva | Chili Thilanka, Tushani Dinushika, Kalum Sri, Rajitha Rodrigo, Kanchana Khan, Teddy Vidyalankara | Action romance | Released on December 16. |
| Thaththa | Prasad Samarathunga | Kumara Thirimadura, Nilmini Tennakoon, Sinethi Akila, Kumara Wanduressa, Sanet Dikkumbura | Drama | Released on December 17. |

== 2024 ==
| Title | Director | Cast | Genre | Notes |
|---|---|---|---|---|
| Villain | Lassana Jayasekara | Kelum Aryan, Dasuni Sinethma, Sudhiksha Samadhi, Teddy Vidyalankara, Sheran Peiris, Sanju Samarasinghe | Action thriller | Released on January 4. |
| Weerya | Sunil Aruna Weerasiri | Jagath Chamila, Sheshadri Priyasad, Kumara Thirimadura, Sriyani Amarasena, Anton Jude | Action drama | Released on January 5. |
| Sihinayaki Adare | Sarov Shanmugam; Donald Jayantha | Hemal Ranasinghe, Pooja Umashankar, Uddika Premarathna, Sheshadri Priyasad, Lucky Dias | Romantic drama | Released on January 18. |
| 1970 Love Story | Aruna Jayawardana | Hemal Ranasinghe, Gamya Wijayadasa, Mahendra Perera, Ashan Dias, Bimal Jayakody, Sandani Fernando | Horror thriller | Released on February 9. |
| Minnu | Asoka Athaudahetti | Harsha Thennakoon, Menaka Peiris, Chandani Seneviratne, Veena Jayakody, Dilhani Ekanayake, Kaushalya Fernando | Drama | Released on February 24. |
| Varna | Ajith Dharmasuriya | Chamathka Lakmini, Vishwa Kodikara, Lakshman Mendis, Jayani Senanayake, Niroshan Buddhika | Drama | Released on March 1. |
| Bambara Wasanthe | Mohan Niyaz | Channa Perera, Tanasha Satharasinghe, Jagath Galappatti, Gayesha Perera, Buddhika Jayaratne, Chanchala Warnasuriya | Romantic drama | Released on March 15. |
| Ridee Seenu | Udayakantha Warnasuriya | Ravindra Randeniya, Sanath Gunathilake, Isuru Lokuhettiarachchi, Upeksha Swarnamali, Shyam Fernando | Children's drama | Released on March 22. |
| Sinhabahu | Somaratne Dissanayake | Akhila Dhanuddara, Yashoda Wimaladharma, Dusheni Miurangi, Sajitha Anthony, Sinethi Akila | Historical drama | Released on April 18. |
| Visal Adare | Wasawa Baduge | Dinakshie Priyasad, Sachin Liyanage, Rashi Praba Sandeepani, Nimesh Viranga | Musical romance | Released on May 3. |
| My Red Comrade | Sudath Mahaadivulwewa | Asiri Allage, Tharindi Fernando | Adult drama | Released on May 17. |
| Sihina Sameekarana | Sasika Herath | Sajitha Anthony, Kasuni Kavindi, Ashan Dias, Maureen Charuni, Randika Gunathilake, Poojana Dandeniya | Drama thriller | Released on May 17. |
| Jobless Douglas | Senaka Nawaratne | Rodney Warnakula, Dilshani Perera, Mahinda Pathirage, Nandana Hettiarachchi, Shantha Gallage, Don Guy | Comedy | Released on June 7. |
| Sudu Appachchi | Rodney Vidanapathirana | Gamini Samarakoon, Ishara Wickramasinghe, Rupa Pathirana, Ranjith Ranasinghe, Stanley Krishnaratne | Children's drama | Released on June 20. |
| Seeruwen | Sudesh Wasantha Pieris | Jackson Anthony, Dasun Pathirana, Buddhika Jayaratne, Dishney Rajapakshe, Semini Iddamalgoda | Thriller drama | Released on July 12. |
| Mandara | Priyantha Colombage | Bimal Jayakodi, Megha Sooriyarachchi, Chulakshi Ranathunga, Saheli Sadithma, Isuru Lokuhettiarachchi | Drama thriller | Released on July 26. |
| Kambili | Prasad Kalupahana | Amila Karunanayake, Nethmi Roshel, Bimal Jayakody, Sanath Gunathilake, Nita Fernando, Dharmapriya Dias | Thriller drama | Released on August 8. |
| Hora Uncle | Harshana Wickramasinghe | Mahendra Perera, Dulani Anuradha, Janaka Kumbukage, Kumara Thirimadura, Umayangana Wickramasinghe | Children's drama | Released on August 9. |
| Doosra | Channa Deshapriya | Sajitha Anthony, Thilakshini Ratnayake, Shyam Fernando, Lakshan Abeynayake, Wasanthi Ranwala | Adult drama | Released on August 9. |
| Sooraya Weeraya | Louis Vanderstraten | Udara Chinthaka Rajapaksa, Cletus Mendis, Sandun Wijesiri, Himaya Bandara, Sarath Dikkumbura | Sci-fi action | Released on August 9. |
| Sihina Nelum Mal | Shameera Rangana Naotunna | Hemal Ranasinghe, Dusheni Miyurangi, Umali Thilakarathne, Sriyani Amarasena, Veena Jayakody, Kalana Gunasekara. | Romantic drama | Released on August 23. |
| Gini Avi Saha Gini Keli 2 | Udayakantha Warnasuriya | Isuru Lokuhettiarachchi, Dhanuka Dilshan, Lucky Dias, Palitha Silva, Rangana Premaratne, Gihan Fernando | Crime | Released on September 26. |
| Apasu Haeren | Ranjith Jayasekara | | Documentary | Released on October 1. |
| Passport | Chris Anthony | Jagath Chamila, Dharmapriya Dias, Mahendra Perera, Darshan Dharmaraj, Nayanathara Wickramarachchi, Priyantha Seneviratne | Drama thriller | Released on October 4. |
| Sri Siddha | Sarath Weerasekara | Dineth De Silva, Ritigala Sumedha, Udari Warnakulasooriya, Paboda Sandeepani, Buddhika Jayaratne, Jagath Chamila | Historical action | Released on October 18. |
| Buffalo Travels | Damith Fonseka | Bandu Samarasinghe, Mahendra Perera, Veena Jayakody, Ronnie Leitch, Damith Fonseka, Priyankara Perera | Comedy | Released on October 25. |
| Rocket | Denuwan Samarasinghe | Neil Dhammika Vatukarawatta, Amila Thandakkara, Nadun Darshan, Chaturanga Erabaddha, Levuhan Mahawatta | Drama | Released on October 25. Produced only with the contributions of school children. |
| Hadagasma | Akila Sandakelum | Arjuna Kamalanath, Shalika Edirisinghe, Nayomi Pieris, Naveen Dilshan, Harshika Ratnayake, Kumara Wanduressa | Drama thriller | Released on November 1. |
| Wishma | Randika Wijemanne | Roshan Pilapitiya, Umayangana Wickramasinghe, Saranga Disasekara, Dinakshie Priyasad | Musical drama | Released on November 13. |
| Pirimi Adarayak | Eranga Senaratne | Menaka Rajapakse, Hiruni Ranasinghe, Ruwan Perera, Susanga Kahandawaarachchi, Nethani Nanayakkara | Romantic drama | Released on November 22. |
| Solo Town | Chathurangana Silva; Sahan Wickramarachchi | Raween Kanishka, Shenaya Wanhoff, Bimal Jayakody, Michelle Dilhara, Semini Iddamalgoda, Sujeewa Priyal | Musical drama | Released on December 5. |
| Gautama Buddha Matha | Sunil Ariyaratne | Dilhani Ekanayake, Dhananjaya Siriwardena, Kelum Aryan, Sampath Jayaweera, Nishshanka Diddeniya, Michelle Dilhara | Biographical drama | Released on December 10. |
| Guru Geethaya | Upali Gamlath | Roshan Ravindra, Kalpani Jayasinghe, Damayanthi Fonseka, Gamini Hettiarachchi, Hyacinth Wijeratne, Jehan Srikanth | Drama | Released on December 12. |

== 2025 ==
| Title | Director | Cast | Genre | Notes |
|---|---|---|---|---|
| Rosa Adare | Harsha Udakanda | Nisala Hettiarachchi, Dinakshie Priyasad, Dilhani Ekanayake, Rajitha Hiran, Wasantha Kumaravila | Action romance | Released on January 3. |
| Kaasi Vaasi | Jayaprakash Sivagurunathan | Giriraj Kaushalya, Rodney Warnakula, Priyantha Seneviratne, Sarath Kothalawala, Gihan Fernando | Comedy | Released on January 23. |
| Rani | Asoka Handagama | Swarna Mallawarachchi, Rehan Amaratunga, Sanath Gunathilake, Sajitha Anthony, Bimal Jayakody, Ashan Dias | Biographical thriller | Released on January 30. |
| Govi Thaththa | Darshana Ruwan Dissanayake | Jagath Chamila, Himali Sayurangi, Dharmapriya Dias, Sanath Wimalasiri, Soorya Dayaruwan, Daya Wayaman | Drama | Released on February 14. |
| 69 | Windya Harispattuwa | Cletus Mendis, Dilrufa Shanaz, Viraj Perera, Himaya Bandara, Shashi Anjelina | Romance | Released on February 14. |
| Ice Cream | Pradeep Dharmadasa | Hemal Ranasinghe, Jayalath Manoratne, Bimal Jayakody, Sarath Kothalawala, Aishara Athukorala | Thriller | Released on March 6. |
| Theja | Nilantha Hapanweera | Nita Fernando, Mahendra Perera, Iranganie Serasinghe, Chamila Peiris, Sujani Menaka | Biographical Thriller | Released on March 7. |
| Nelum Kuluna | Ilango Ram | Kaushalya Fernando, Priyantha Sirikumara, Thusitha Laknath, Chandani Seneviratne, Dilhani Ekanayake, Ranjith Panagoda | Dark comedy | Released on March 14. |
| Sihina Sarungal | Dr. Upul Weerasinghe; Tharaka Adhikari | Sathischandra Edirisinghe, Cletus Mendis, Hemasiri Liyanage, Roshan Ranawana, Kumara Thirimadura | Children's drama | Released on March 14. |
| Kaputu Koho | Somaratne Dissanayake | Amandya Uthpali, Harshana Dissanayake, Abhilasi Santhushki, Dilan Wickramasinghe | Musical drama | Released on March 27. |
| Walampoori: Seven and Half Dreams | Lakmal Dharmaratne | Priyantha Sirikumara, Dilhani Ekanayake, Sarath Kothalawala, Thumindu Dodantenna, Wasantha Moragoda, Ashan Dias | Thriller | Released on April 25. |
| Soona | Shan Jayarathna | Wasantha Kumaravila, Miona De Silva, Maureen Charuni, Gavinda Navaratne, Pathum Vidanagamage | Action thriller | Released on May 9. |
| Devi Kusumasana | Jayantha Chandrasiri | Hemal Ranasinghe, Udari Warnakulasooriya , Mahendra Perera, Sriyantha Mendis, Megha Sooriyaarachchi | Historical Thriller | Released on May 22. |
| House Full | Lal Priyadeva | Isuru Lokuhettiarachchi, Chulakshi Ranathunga, Jeewan Kumaranatunga, Mihira Sirithilaka, Shalika Edirisinghe | Comedy drama | Released on May 29. |
| Bahuchithawadiya | Malaka Dewapriya | Kalana Gunasekara, Veena Jayakody, Lakshman Mendis, Samanalee Fonseka, Damitha Abeyratne | Thriller | Released on May 30. |
| Clarence: Rhythm of the Guitar | Theja Iddamalgoda | Damith Wijayathunga, Saranga Disasekara, Dinakshie Priyasad, Sheshadri Priyasad | Biographical musical | Released on June 27. |
| Soorya | Mahesh Munasinghe | Janith Wickramage, Nihari Perera, Dilhani Ekanayake, Lucky Dias, Dinesh Muthugala | Action thriller | Released on July 12. |
| Hello From The Other Side | Vinosha Kiriwandeniya | Damith Wijayathunga, Dilki Dissanayake, Kanishka Ranabahu, Kamal Deshapriya, Maureen Charuni | Drama | Released on July 31. |
| Mother Lanka | Anusha Sanjeewa Edirimuni | Tharindi Fernando, Shenuki Disalya, Dhananjaya Siriwardena, Bimal Jayakodi, Sanath Gunathilake | Sports action | Released on August 14. |
| Elada Braa | Pujitha Senaratne | Pubudu Chathuranga, Rodney Warnakula, Priyantha Seneviratne, Sriyantha Mendis, Sarath Kothalawala | Comedy | Released on August 29. |
| Neera | Wasawa Baduge | Shanudrie Priyasad, Zenith Gajaweera, Kasuni Kavindi, Piyumali Edirisinghe, Kaushalya Fernando | Romance | Released on September 19. |
| Aayu | Chathra Weeraman | Malini Fonseka, Jagath Manuwarna, Sandra Mack, Ashan Dias, Thumindu Dodantenna | Thriller | Released on October 2. |
| Moda Tharindu | Thisara Imbulana | Surya Dayaruwan, Dhanuka Dilshan, Shanudrie Priyasad, Kaushalya Fernando, Shehani Kahandawala | Comedy horror | Released on October 10. |
| Reyak Ho Peyak | Lal Weerasinghe | Lal Weerasinghe, Channa Perera, Dilukshi Weerapperuma, Noshin de Silva, Rajitha Hiran, Kumara Jayakantha | Action thriller | Released on October 30. |
| Mr. Missis | Charith Abeysinghe | Uddika Premarathna, Dinakshie Priyasad, Mahendra Perera, Mihira Sirithilaka, Sarath Kothalawala | Comedy drama | Released on November 20. |
| Maria | Aruna Jayawardene | Mahendra Perera, Hemal Ranasinghe, Ashan Dias, Darshan Dharmaraj, Dasun Pathirana | Thriller | Released on November 21. |
| Adhiran | Thinesh Kanagaraj | Sudharshan Raveendran, Michelle Dilhara, Elroy Amalathas, Arun Suseen, Vinoth Kishan | Action thriller | Released on November 28. |
| Cyanide | Nalin Rajapaksa | Ranish Hewage, Raja Ganesan, Jagath Galappatti, Geetha Kanthi Jayakody, Alexi Fernando | Drama thriller | Released on December 26. |

== 2026 ==
| Title | Director | Cast | Genre | Notes |
|---|---|---|---|---|
| Malaki Duwe Nubha | Kalpana Ariyawansa; Vindana Ariyawansa | Malani Fonseka, Samanalee Fonseka, Kushenya Fonseka, Shyam Fernando, Dhananjaya Siriwardena | Drama | Released on January 2. |
| Father | Chaminda Jayasuriya | Poojana Dandeniya, Saumya Liyanage, Bimal Jayakodi, Jagath Manuwarna, Chandani Senevirathne | Gangster crime | Released on January 9. |
| Dharmayuddhaya 2 | Aruna Jayawardena | Bimal Jayakody, Dilhani Ekanayake, Kusum Renu, Kumara Thirimadura, Ashan Dias | Crime thriller | Released on January 23. |
| Abheetha | Sruthiy Prabha | Sriyani Amarasena, Sriyantha Mendis, Isuru Lokuhettiarachchi, Paboda Sandeepani, Mahendra Perera | Drama | Released on 6 February 2026. |
| The Wife | Shameera Naotunna | Hemal Ranasinghe, Udari Warnakulasooriya, Veena Jayakody, Lakshman Mendis, Nethalie Nanayakkara | Drama | Released on 13 February 2026. |
| Sura Detuwo | Lakmal Weerasiri | Lakmal Weerasiri, Shan Arosha, Nethini Weerasiri, Dilhani Ekanayake, Sanath Gunathilake, Dhananjaya Siriwardena | Comedy | Released on 12 March 2026. |
| Anthony | Sukirthan Chrithuraja; Jenosan Rajeswar | Sudharshan Raveendran, Nizhalgal Ravi, Aruldoss, Kayal Wilson, Soumi Munasinghe, T.J. Bhanu | Drama | Released on 13 March 2026. |
| Sergeant Punchisoma | Udayakantha Warnasuriya | Priyantha Seneviratne, Rodney Warnakula, Duleeka Marapana, Sriyantha Mendis, Kumara Thirimadura | Comedy | Released on April 17. |
| Riverstone | Lalith Rathnayake | Shyam Fernando, Mahendra Perera, Priyantha Sirikumara, Randika Gunathilaka | Thriller | Released on 23 April 2026. |
| O.I.C Gadafi | Ranjan Ramanayake | Ranjan Ramanayake, Sriyantha Mendis, Mahendra Perera, Gihan Fernando, Dharmapriya Dias | Action | Released on 24 April 2026. |
| Wessanthara Raja Dawasa | Dayasuriya Arachchi | Shinethi Akhila, Wijeratne Warakagoda, D. B. Gangodathenna, Dammika Manojeeva | | Released on 28 May 2026. |
| Rajadahana | Wasitha Samaranayake | Amila Karunanayake, Tanasha Shatharasinghe, Douglas Ranasinghe, Nirosha Thalagala, Rohitha Manage, Jagath Galappaththi | Family Drama | Released on 19 June 2026. |
| Room No 106 | Suranga De Alwis | Bimal Jayakody, Disni Rajapakse, Shyam Fernando, Damitha Abeyratne, Dhananjaya Siriwardena | Thriller | Released on 26 June 2026. |
| Suriya Sulanga | Priyantha Colombage | Meghe Suriyaarachchi, Nihari Perera, Ashan Dias, Sanath Gunathilake, Isuru Lokuhettiarachchi | Action/Thriller | Released on 04 June 2026. |
| Eka Thamai Meka | Suranga De Alwis | Ranga Jayakody, Chamal Ratnayake, Rathindu Senarathne, Lochana Jayakody, Shan Arosha, Lakmal Weerasekara | Comedy | Released on 19 June 2026. |
| Chandarege Wife | Prasanna Jayakody | Saumya Liyanage, Nadeesha Hemamali, Sarath Kothalawala, Duleeka Marapana | Drama | Released on 15 May 2026. |
| Oscar | Eranga Senarathne | Palitha Silva, Madhushani Wickramasinghe, Lakshika Fonseka, Kanchana Khan, Asanka Mendis | | Released on 10 July 2026. |
| My Simba | JK | Roshan Ranawana, Suraj Mapa, Nayomi Thakshila, Kalana Gunasekara, Rajitha Hiran | Family adventure | Released on 11 July 2026. |
| Monara Vilak | Rasika Liyanage | Malini Fonseka, Roshan Ranawana, Sanath Gunathilake, Veena Jayakody, Umayangana Wickramasinghe | Drama | Released on 24 July 2026. |
| Adaraneeya Tharuwak | Dilshan Amarasinghe | Saranga Disasekara, Shanudrie Priyasad, Sangeetha Weeraratne, Sanath Gunathilake, Jeewan Kumaranatunga, Sujeewa Priyalal | Romantic/Musical | Released on 06 August 2026. |
| Vihanga Premaya | Sanjeewa Pushpakumara | Sabeetha Perera, Mahendra Perera, Akalanka Prabhashwara, Dinara Punchihewa | Drama | Released on 07 August 2026. |
| Kalpana | Saranga Mendis | Raween Kanishka, Nethmi Roshel, Sanath Gunathilake, Sriyantha Mendis, Jenat Anthony | Romantic | |
| Cricket Sadu | Dilshara Jayamanna | Damithu Fernando, Hemasiri Liyanage, Sanath Gunathilake, Sriyani Amarasena, Udayanthi Kulathunga | | Released on 28 Aguest 2026. |
| Man Hoyanne Premayak | Thilina Boralessa | Abhilashi Santhuski, Dharshan Thavaraja, Nilmini Tennakoon | Romantic | Released on 03 September 2026. |
| Eda Raa | Aruna Jayawardena | Roshan Ravindra, Nethmi Roshel, Sheshadri Priyasad, Senali Fonseka, Roshan Ranawana, Saranga Disasekara, Kalana Gunasekara | Biography Drama | Released on 18 September 2026 |
| Ahasa Tharam | Prasadi Abeygunarathne | Ridma Weerawardena, Rashiprabha Sandeepani, Uma Asheni, Mayura Kanchana Perera | Romantic | Released on 30 September 2026 |
| Dinga | Dilanka Ranganath | Thusitha Laknath, Thilakshini Rathnayaka, Thumindu Dodantenna | Romantic | Released on 16 October 2026. |
| Agnijaya | Manchana Tharaka Piris | Manchana Tharaka Piris, Shanudrie Priyasad, Sriyani Amarasena, Kalana Gunasekara, Bimal Jayakody, Sanath Gunathilake, Sheshadri Priyasad, Jagath Chamila | Action | Released on 29 October 2026. |
| Rahai Jeewithe | Dinesh Priyasad | Tennison Cooray, Sheshadri Priyasad, Dilhani Ekanayake, Robin Fernando, Mahinda Pathirage, Mohan Hettiarachchi | Comedy | Released on 12 November 2026. |

=== 2026 Upcoming Movies ===
| Title | Director | Cast | Genre | Notes |
|---|---|---|---|---|
| May Maara Prasangaya | Mahinda Prasad Masimbula | Roshan Ravindra, Umali Thilakarathne | Romantic | |
| Sheysha | Isuru Gunathilake | Chandana Wickramasinghe, Umali Thilakarathne | Drama | |
| Rizana – A Caged Bird | Chandran Rutnam | Vidushika Reddy, Jeremy Irons, Varalaxmi Sarathkumar, Yousuf Al Housni | Drama | |
| Eka Gei Sokari | Jackson Anthony | Akila Dhanuddhara, Udari Warnakulasooriya, Senali Fonseka, Susila Kottage, Wilson Gunaratne, Sajitha Anthony | | |
| Sara Susum | Shan Jayarathna | Shalani Tharaka, Akhila Dhanuddara, Dinithi Walgamage, Mayura Kanchana, Amila Karunanayake | Thriller | |
| Marine Drive | Megha Sooriyarachchi | Darshan Dharmaraj, Kalana Gunasekara, Nayanathara Wickramarachchi, Dharani Bandara, Sandaruwan Bandara, Shyam Fernando | Thriller | |
| The Hidden City | Jayantha Chandrasiri | Hemal Ranasinghe, Kanchana Mendis, Thumindu Dodantenna, Paboda Sandeepani | Thriller | |

== See also ==
- Cinema of Sri Lanka
- List of Sri Lankan films

== Sources ==
|}
