= List of Sri Lankan actors =

The following is a list of notable Sri Lankan actors.

== A ==
- Damitha Abeyratne
- Amila Abeysekara
- Charith Abeysinghe
- Dilani Abeywardana
- Joe Abeywickrama
- Kamal Addararachchi
- Anarkali Akarsha
- Daya Alwis
- Sriyani Amarasena
- Shyama Ananda
- Madhavee Wathsala Anthony
- Jackson Anthony
- Sajitha Anthony
- Dulani Anuradha
- Jayasekara Aponso
- Awanthi Aponsu
- Manike Attanayake

== B ==
- Jagath Benaragama
- Sanoja Bibile
- Anula Bulathsinhala
- Lucien Bulathsinhala
- Nilmini Buwaneka

== C ==
- Jagath Chamila
- Susantha Chandramali
- Sarath Chandrasiri
- Maureen Charuni
- Pubudu Chathuranga
- Vasanthi Chathurani
- Tennyson Cooray

== D ==
- Anusha Damayanthi
- Wimal Kumara de Costa
- Kamal Deshapriya
- Tillakaratne Dilshan
- Darshan Dharmaraj
- Ashan Dias
- Dharmapriya Dias
- Gayathri Dias
- Lucky Dias
- Michelle Dilhara
- Sonia Disa
- Saranga Disasekara
- Thumindu Dodantenna
- Wasantha Dukgannarala

== E ==
- Dilhani Ekanayake
- Mercy Edirisinghe
- Sathischandra Edirisinghe
- Samantha Epasinghe

== F ==
- Baptist Fernando
- Gihan Fernando
- Kaushalya Fernando
- Nilukshi Fernando
- Nita Fernando
- Robin Fernando
- Sandani Fernando
- Shyam Fernando
- Damayanthi Fonseka
- Gamini Fonseka
- Malini Fonseka
- Samanalee Fonseka
- Senali Fonseka

== G ==
- Akalanka Ganegama
- D. B. Gangodathenna
- Sumana Gomes
- Berty Gunathilake
- Sanath Gunathilake
- Nadeeka Gunasekara
- Wilson Gunaratne
- Gayan Gunawardana

== H ==
- Denawaka Hamine
- Sando Harris
- Punya Heendeniya
- Gamini Hettiarachchi
- Sunil Hettiarachchi
- Rajitha Hiran

== I ==
- Semini Iddamalgoda
- Danu Innasithamby

== J ==
- Anoma Janadari
- Asela Jayakody
- Bimal Jayakody
- Geetha Kanthi Jayakody
- Rathna Lalani Jayakody
- Veena Jayakody
- W. Jayasiri
- Kokila Jayasuriya
- Thesara Jayawardane
- Anton Jude

== K ==
- Shehani Kahandawala
- Amarasiri Kalansuriya
- Chandra Kaluarachchi
- Arjuna Kamalanath
- Raween Kanishka
- Wilson Karunaratne
- Anula Karunathilaka
- Kasuni Kavindi
- Giriraj Kaushalya
- Rathnawali Kekunawela
- Chethana Ketagoda
- Rex Kodippili
- Sarath Kothalawala
- Leonie Kotelawala
- Susila Kottage
- Lal Kularatne
- Jeewan Kumaranatunga
- Vijaya Kumaranatunga
- Geetha Kumarasinghe
- Wasantha Kumaravila
- Seetha Kumari
- Janaka Kumbukage
- Jeevarani Kurukulasuriya
- Menik Kurukulasuriya

== L ==
- Thusitha Laknath
- Ronnie Leitch
- Hemasiri Liyanage
- Saumya Liyanage
- Isuru Lokuhettiarachchi

== M ==
- Kusal Maduranga
- Kavindu Madushan
- Srinath Maddumage
- Swarna Mallawarachchi
- Jayalath Manoratne
- Suraj Mapa
- Duleeka Marapana
- Sujani Menaka
- Cletus Mendis
- Kanchana Mendis
- Lakshman Mendis
- Sriyantha Mendis
- Devika Mihirani
- Lahiru Mudalige

== N ==
- Sarath Namalgama
- Vijaya Nandasiri
- Chandika Nanayakkara
- Nethalie Nanayakkara
- Rebeka Nirmali
- Yureni Noshika

== P ==
- Sujatha Paramanathan
- Mahinda Pathirage
- Dasun Pathirana
- Asoka Peiris
- Chathurika Peiris
- Nehara Peiris
- Channa Perera
- G. R. Perera
- Gayesha Perera
- H. A. Perera
- Mahendra Perera
- Sabeetha Perera
- Udari Perera
- Roshan Pilapitiya
- Devnaka Porage
- Janak Premalal
- Rangana Premaratne
- Uddika Premarathna
- Sujeewa Priyalal
- Dinakshie Priyasad
- Shanudrie Priyasad
- Sheshadri Priyasad

== R ==
- Aruni Rajapaksha
- Menaka Rajapakse
- Ranjan Ramanayake
- Douglas Ranasinghe
- Hemal Ranasinghe
- Tony Ranasinghe
- Chulakshi Ranathunga
- Roshan Ranawana
- Ravindra Randeniya
- Sahan Ranwala
- Priyankara Rathnayake
- Somy Rathnayake
- Thilak Kumara Rathnayake
- Udara Rathnayake
- Roshan Ravindra
- Kusum Renu

== S ==
- Damitha Saluwadana
- Bandu Samarasinghe
- Miyuri Samarasinghe
- Paboda Sandeepani
- Himali Sayurangi
- Linton Semage
- Jayani Senanayake
- Chandani Seneviratne
- Priyantha Seneviratne
- Roger Seneviratne
- Iranganie Serasinghe
- Deepani Silva
- Freddie Silva
- Palitha Silva
- Suminda Sirisena
- Mihira Sirithilaka
- Dhananjaya Siriwardena
- Chandrika Siriwardena
- Himali Siriwardena
- Vishaka Siriwardana
- Sachini Ayendra Stanley
- Edna Sugathapala
- Raja Sumanapala
- Rathna Sumanapala
- Upeksha Swarnamali

== T ==
- Nilmini Tennakoon
- Sampath Tennakoon
- Nirosha Thalagala
- Shalani Tharaka
- Dharshan Thavaraja
- Daya Thennakoon
- Umali Thilakarathne
- Kumara Thirimadura

== U ==
- Nalin Pradeep Udawela
- Pooja Umashankar
- Vidhushi Uththara

== V ==
- Teddy Vidyalankara
- Bandula Vithanage
- Buddhadasa Vithanarachchi

== W ==
- Chitra Wakishta
- Manel Wanaguru
- Ramya Wanigasekara
- Wijeratne Warakagoda
- Rodney Warnakula
- Udari Warnakulasooriya
- Namel Weeramuni
- Sangeetha Weeraratne
- Anoja Weerasinghe
- Lal Weerasinghe
- Suvineetha Weerasinghe
- Ananda Wickramage
- Cyril Wickramage
- Umayangana Wickramasinghe
- Gamya Wijayadasa
- Damith Wijayathunga
- Hyacinth Wijeratne
- Madhava Wijesinghe
- Yashoda Wimaladharma
- Sanath Wimalasiri

== Y ==
- Ravindra Yasas
- Thisuri Yuwanika
