= Jayakody =

Jayakody ජයකොඩි
- Gender: Unisex
- Language: Sinhala

Origin
- Meaning: Victory flag, victorious flag

Other names
- Variant form: Jayakodi

Jayakody (Sinhala: ජයකොඩි) is a Sinhalese family name. It means "victory flag/ victorious flag" or "flag of victory" with "jaya" (ජය) meaning victory and "kody" (කොඩි) meaning flag. In traditional Sinhalese, the family name goes in the front, therefore Jayakody may also appear at the front of one's name despite being a family name. Notable people with the family name include:

- Bathiya Jayakody (born 1976), member of Sri Lankan pop duo Bathiya and Santhush
- Bimal Jayakody (born 1977), Sri Lankan actor and singer.
- Edward Jayakody (born 1952), Sri Lankan musician, singer and composer.
- Geetha Kanthi Jayakody (born 1957), Sri Lankan actress and dubbing artist.
- Lakshman Jayakody (1930–2010), Sri Lankan Cabinet Minister.
- Marcelline Jayakody (1902–1998), Sri Lankan Catholic priest, musician, lyricist, author, journalist and patriot.
- Prasanna Jayakody (born 1968), Sri Lankan film director and screen writer
- Rathna Lalani Jayakody (born 1964) Sri Lankan actress and teacher.
