= Kasuni Kavindi =

Sri Lankan actress

Kasuni Kavindi Fernando
- කසුනි කාවින්දි
- Born: Kasuni Kavindi Fernando; Ratnapura, Sri Lanka
- Education: University of the Visual and Performing Arts (BA)
- Alma mater: Ferguson High School, Ratnapura
- Occupations: Actor, voice actor, presenter
- Years active: 2012–present

Kasuni Kavindi Fernando, popularly known as Kasuni Kavindi, is a Sri Lankan actress who appears in stage, television, and film productions. She gained recognition for her dramatic performances and won the Best Actress award at the National Youth Drama Festival in 2014. She has also been nominated for Best Actress at the State Drama Festival (2015) and the National Youth Drama Festival (2017).

== Career ==
Fernando began her career in theatre, where she developed her acting skills through stage performances. She later expanded into television and film, appearing in Sinhala teledramas and Sri Lankan cinema.

She has appeared in several television dramas including Nadagamkarayo and Thanamalvila Kollek. Her film contributions include roles in Uthuru Sulanga, Gajaman, and Sihina Sameekarana.

She gained recognition for her involvement in Sri Lanka's first 3D animated film, Gajaman, in which she portrayed the character Padmawathi through motion capture performance. The film marked a milestone in Sri Lankan cinema as the country's first full-length 3D animated feature, and her performance contributed to bringing the animated character to life through motion capture acting.

== Early life and education ==
Kasuni Kavindi Fernando was born in Ratnapura, Sri Lanka. She received her primary and secondary education at Ferguson High School, Ratnapura , where she completed her General Certificate of Education Advanced Level (GCE A/L) examinations.

She later pursued higher education in the performing arts and graduated from the University of the Visual and Performing Arts, earning a degree in a field related to visual and performing arts.

== Filmography ==
=== Theatre ===
Year	Title	Role	Director
2024	Apa Athara U		Chamara Guruge

=== Film ===
Year	Film	Role	Director
2021	Uthuru Sulanga		Chamara Janaraj Peiris
2023	Gajaman	Padmawathi	Chanaka Perera
2024	Sihina Sameekarana	Ridmi	Sasika Herath
2025	Neera	Rashmi	Wasawa Baduge

=== Television ===
Year	Teledrama	Role	Director	Channel
2013	Maada Obama Viya			
2021	Nadagamkarayo	Rasika Gunaratne	Jayaprakash Sivagurunathan	Swarnavahini

== Awards and nominations ==
- 2025 — Calin Sarasaviya Awards | Sihina Sameekarana
