= Kanchana Anuradhi =

Sri Lankan Singer

- Born: September 13, 1998 (age 28); Ragama, Gampaha, Sri Lanka
- Education: Rathnawali Balika Vidyalaya, Gampaha
- Occupations: Singer, songwriter, musician, performing artist
- Years active: 2016–present

Juwan Gomasge Kanchana Anuradhi Fernando (කාංචනා අනුරාධි; born 13 September 1998), popularly known as Kanchana Anuradhi, is a Sri Lankan singer and musician. One of the most popular performing artists in Sri Lanka, Anuradhi has maintained equal popularity in both indoor and outdoor musical shows across the country.

== Personal life ==
Kanchana Anuradhi was born on 13 September 1998 in Ragama, Gampaha, Sri Lanka as the youngest of the family. Her father is Aruna Patrick and mother is Kaluarachchilage Anusha Deepani. She completed education from Rathnavali Balika Vidyalaya, Gampaha. She has one elder sister: Madhavi Anuththara.

She has a special degree in Performing Arts from University of the Visual and Performing Arts with a first class. She is also an A-grade singer at the Sri Lanka Broadcasting Corporation (SLBC). Apart from that, she excelled in Low country dancing at school level.

== Music life ==
In 2016, she won the award for the Best Traditional Folk Singer at the State Music Awards Festival. In the same year, she won the inter-school competition in vocal category as well. During this period, she got the opportunity to perform in the television shows such as Sirasa Sixteen Plus and Kids Studio.

Anuradhi achieved her major breakthrough in July 2020 with the release of her self-composed solo single "Udurawee", which preceded her later collaborative hits.

In 2022, she made her first original "Naaden" along with fellow singer Supun Perera. The song became an international success and won the award for the Most Viewed Song in that year at the Derana Music Video Awards festival. Her other songs "Udarawee" and remake "Karakara Badinnata" also became sensations among the youth.

In 2023, she released the solo hit "Aaley Mal", which was also won the award for the Most Popular Song of the Year at the Popular Awards. In that year, she also won the Most Promising upcoming singer award at the Business World International Awards. She also nominated for Most Popular Category at the Sri Lanka Vanithabhimana awards ceremony in 2023.

In 2024, Anuradhi was selected as a Spotify South Asian Heritage Month Ambassador, where she represented Sri Lanka in international billboards in New York, Toronto and London. In April 2024, she collaborated with fellow singers for "Suwasara Gee Dahana" music concert which was held in aid of the All Ceylon Kidney Patients Association held at the Nelum Pokuna Theatre in Colombo.

In the same year, she won the award for the Most Popular Singer at the Abhiman Awards and later the award for the Best Singer at the Asia's Icon Awards.

Following the global success, Anuradhi released the music video "Kalareka" in 2025 which received international award nominations and accolades. In the same year, she released the song "Ragana Vayana", where its music video won the Most Popular Music Video of the Year award as well at the Popular Awards.

As a background vocalist, Anuradhi sang in the films: Visal Adare, Gautama Buddha Matha, Kambili (film) Father. In the film Visal Adare, she also contributed as a lyricist.

== Beyond music ==
Apart from music, Anuradhi serves as brand ambassador in many commercial brands such as Nature's Secrets, Dialog Axiata and Abans. Meanwhile, she is preparing to launch the Kanchana Anuradhi Foundation, which is dedicated to empowering youth, fostering creative education and promoting well-being through the stream of art.

== Discography ==
- Aaley Manalai
- Ada Yan Dan Maath Ekka ("Solo Town" film)
- Akikaru Pem Kathawak
- Aale Mal
- Amma Wage
- Dana Dana Ma
- Danena Thuru Ma
- Hadisida Manda
- Kaali
- Karakara Badinnata
- Layama Piruna
- Loveena
- Malsara Balma Hela ("Yugathra" film)
- Maayam (Naden Tamil Version)
- Man Adarei
- Manahari ("Kambili" film)
- Manamala Katha
- Merry Christmas
- Naaden
- Noliyami
- Opada
- Pathiniyane ("Father" film)
- Pawee
- Prana Sama Pema
- Ragana Gayana
- Rallen Ralle
- Romeo
- Samiduge Maga
- Sansarini
- Seema
- Udurawee

== Filmography ==
Year	Film	Role	Ref.
2024	Visal Adare	Playback singer, lyricist	
2024	Solo Town	Playback singer	
2024	Gautama Buddha Matha	Playback singer	
2024	Kambili	Playback singer	
2026	Father	Playback singer	
TBD	Adaraneeya Tharuwak	Playback singer	
