= Gamani (film) =

- Film poster
- Sinhala: ගාමනි
- Directed by: Rear Admiral Sarath Weerasekara
- Written by: Sarath Weerasekara
- Produced by: Upali Rajapakse
- Starring: Dilhani Ekanayake; Bimal Jayakody; Mahendra Perera
- Cinematography: Ashoka Sigera
- Edited by: Ravindra Guruge
- Music by: Nadeeka Guruge
- Production companies: Prasad Color Lab; TVT Studio
- Distributed by: E.A.P Board
- Release date: 19 August 2011
- Running time: 158 minutes
- Country: Sri Lanka
- Language: Sinhala
- Budget: 85 SL Lakhs

Gamani (Sinhala: ගාමනි) is a 2011 Sri Lankan Sinhala war thriller biographical film directed by Rear Admiral Sarath Weerasekara and produced by Upali Rajapakse. It stars Dilhani Ekanayake and Bimal Jayakody in lead roles along with Mahendra Perera and Jagath Chamila. Music composed by Nadeeka Guruge. It is the 1245th film in Sri Lankan cinema.

The film is influenced by 1999 LTTE terrorist attack of Gonagala massacre. The film has been shot in and around Karuwalagaswewa for 12 consecutive days.

== Cast ==
- Dilhani Ekanayake as Sulochana Weerasekera 'Iskola Hamine'
- Bimal Jayakody as Major Vikum
- Mahendra Perera as Mahendra
- Jagath Chamila as Sunimal
- W. Jayasiri as Sumedha 'Hamuduruwo'
- Ranjith Rubasinghe as Sirisoma
- Jagath Benaragama as Jagath
- Suminda Sirisena as School teacher
- Kumara Thirimadura as Sergeant Ranasinghe
- Darshan Dharmaraj as LTTE leader
- Sampath Jayaweera as Upul
- Muthu Tharanga as Mala
- Asela Jayakody as Head Grama Arakshaka
- Sarath Kothalawala Ranasinghe's head officer
- Sanath Gunathilake as Army Chief
- Ritigala Sumedha as himself
- Damitha Abeyratne as Crouched shooter
- Veena Jayakody as Dead rebel's mother
- Giriraj Kaushalya as NGO officer
- Geetha Kanthi Jayakody as Sudha's mother
- Rathna Lalani Jayakody as Murder victim
- Gihan Fernando as Minister's secretary
- Sujani Menaka as Upul's lover
- Manel Wanaguru as NGO Committee member
- Jayani Senanayake as Head Grama Arakshaka's wife
- Sarath Chandrasiri as LTTE cadre

== Soundtrack ==
No.	Title	Lyrics	Singer(s)	Length
1.	"Dana Mana Bandu"	Sarath Weerasekara	Deepika Priyadarshani

== Awards ==
The film won 12 awards at 2011 Derana Film Awards Ceremony, including many major categories.

- Best Actress - Dilhani Ekanayake
- Best Film - Gamani
- Best Villain - Darshan Dharmaraj
- Best Music Director - Nadeeka Guruge
- Best Editing - Ravindra Guruge
- Best Stunt Direction - Priyantha Sirikumara (Ritigala Sumedha)
- Best Script - Rear Admiral Sarath Weerasekara
- Best Direction - Rear Admiral Sarath Weerasekara
- Best Co-actor - W. Jayasiri and Kumara Thirimadura
- Best Co-actress - Muthu Tharanga
- Best Cinematography - Ashoka Sigera
- Best Background Artist - Deepika Priyadarshani
