= Thanapathilage Gedara =

Thanapathilage Gedara තානාපතිලාගේ ගෙදර
- Directed by: Nalin Mapitiya
- Written by: Nalin Mapitiya
- Produced by: Universal Media; ExpoLanka group
- Starring: Sriyantha Mendis; Buddhadasa Vithanarachchi; Roshan Pilapitiya
- Cinematography: Suminda Arunalu
- Edited by: Ajith Ramanayake
- Music by: Darshana Ruwan Dissanayake
- Release date: 2007
- Country: Sri Lanka
- Language: Sinhala

Thanapathilage Gedara (Ambassador's House) (Sinhala: තානාපතිලාගේ ගෙදර) is a 2007 Sri Lankan Sinhala comedy film directed by Nalin Mapitiya and co-produced by Dr. Arosha Fernando for Universal Media with Haniff Yusoof for ExpoLanka group. It stars Sriyantha Mendis and Buddhadasa Vithanarachchi in lead roles along with Roshan Pilapitiya and Saranga Disasekara. Music composed by Darshana Ruwan Dissanayake.

== Cast ==
- Sriyantha Mendis
- Palitha Silva
- Saranga Disasekara
- Buddhadasa Vithanarachchi
- Roshan Pilapitiya
- Janak Premalal
- Janaka Kumbukage
- Gangu Roshana
- Roshan Ravindra
- Himali Siriwardena
- Sachini Ayendra
- Umali Thilakarathne
- Sooriyaloka Dayaruwan
- Dilhani Ekanayake
- Cletus Mendis
- Bimal Jayakody
- Giriraj Kaushalya
- Rathna Lalani Jayakody
- Kamal Deshapriya
- Sampath Tennakoon
- Prasannajith Abeysuriya
- Chinthaka Kulathunga
- Dimuthu Chinthaka
- Wasantha Wittachchi
- Richard Manamudali
- Ruwan Wickramasinghe
- Kumudu Nishantha
- Wilman Sirimanne
