= Neera (film) =

2025 Sri Lankan romantic drama film

- Sinhala: නීරා
- Directed by: Wasawa Baduge
- Written by: Sumithra Rahubadda
- Produced by: Hiruni Sithara Baduge; Lalindra Wijewickrama
- Starring: Piyumali Edirisinghe; Shanudrie Priyasad; Kasuni Kavindi; Zenith Gajaweera
- Cinematography: Wasawa Baduge; Saranga Perera
- Edited by: Wasawa Baduge
- Music by: Yasas Medagedara
- Production company: Bluesky Productions
- Distributed by: CEL, LFD Theatres
- Release date: 18 September 2025
- Running time: 131 minutes
- Language: Sinhala

Neera (Sinhala: නීරා) is a 2025 Sri Lankan Sinhalese romantic drama film directed by Wasawa Baduge and co-produced by Hiruni Sithara Baduge and Lalindra Wijewickrama for Bluesky Productions. The film stars popular television actress Piyumali Edirisinghe in maiden cinema role along with Shanudrie Priyasad, Kasuni Kavindi and Zenith Gajaweera in lead roles.

== Plot ==
The film opens with Mega (Zenith) writing to his pen pal, a girl named Neera. Though they have never seen each other, they develop a strong bond through their letters. Both feel they love each other despite never expressing it directly. Meanwhile, Mega gets involved in university politics even though he is now an alumnus, which causes him to lose his job, and he has to run away from the authorities and current politicians. He has a friend, Rashimi (Kasuni Kavindi), who helps him throughout his university life and career. It is shown that she loves Mega too, but he is not interested in her. She helps Mega flee.

The film then shifts to five years later, where Mega is now a creative director at an advertising firm. He meets and falls in love with Praneethi (Shanudrie), a famous dancer. She is smitten by him as well. They get married and live a happy life. Praneethi becomes pregnant with twins, and they look forward to parenthood. However, she unfortunately has a miscarriage. This leads to a fallout between the two, as Mega seemingly blames Praneethi, saying her dancing caused the miscarriage. With the help of Mega’s mother (Kaushalya Fernando), they eventually patch things up.

At this point, Rashmi unexpectedly re-enters their lives. She is now happily married, yet deep down she still loves Mega and feels jealous of Praneethi. Praneethi becomes suspicious of Rashmi. Rashmi reminds Mega of his old love for his pen pal Neera and hands him the letters he had asked her to safekeep while he was in hiding. This causes Mega to rethink his love for Neera, leading him to ignore Praneethi.

Unable to bear Mega’s change in behavior, Praneethi leaves the house and begins dancing again. One day, Mega shows up and asks her to sign divorce papers, which Praneethi reluctantly agrees to. That night, while putting away memories of Praneethi, Mega finds an unposted letter inside one of her books addressed to Poorna, Mega’s pen name, in which Neera reveals her identity to him. This shocks him, as he never imagined Praneethi to be Neera.

The next day, he pleads with Praneethi for a second chance, but she declines. She says she values her peace and self-dignity more than a man who lived in a fantasy. She explains that when she married him, she let go of Poorna and stayed true to her husband, but he did not. The movie ends suggesting that Praneethi moves on with her life, while Mega remains stuck in the past.

== Cast ==
- Piyumali Edirisinghe as Neera
- Shanudrie Priyasad as Praneethi
- Kasuni Kavindi as Rashmi
- Zenith Gajaweera as Megha

== Production ==
This is the third film directed by Wasawa Baduge, following his 2022 film Adaraneeya Prarthana and his 2024 film Visal Adare. He also contributed to the film's cinematography and editing. In addition to directing, Saranga Perera also served as a cinematographer. The producers of the film are Hiruni Sithara Baduge and Lalindra Wijewickrama. The story was written by award-winning writer Sumithra Rahubadda.

Assistant directors are Tachith Eshan, Darshana Wimalaguna and Danushka Perera. Charith Brian is the art director, Eranjana Jayawardena is the costume designer and Kavindu Madushan is the choreographer. Production management was handled by Niroshan Welagedara, while makeup was co-handled by Wasana Navaratne and Anjali Ilangakone. Buthmal Uyanhewa is the still photographer, and media promotions were handled by Nihal Sanjaya. The song lyricists are Shehan Galahitiyawa and Yashodha Adhikari. Yasas Medagedara is the music director and also provided background vocals along with Raveen Tharuka.

== Release ==
The teaser of the film was released on 2 September 2025. The film was released on 18 September 2025 in CEL and LFD cinemas. It crossed the 100 million mark within 26 days of its release, surpassing the previous record set by "Visal Adare", which reached the milestone in 45 days. The film also achieved 80 house-full screening on a Saturday and Sunday, and recorded a daily collection of Rs. 100 lakh on 12 October, with an audience of 18,101 in a single day.
