= Bomba Saha Rosa =

- Sinhala: බෝම්බ හා රෝස
- Directed by: Anuruddha Jayasinghe
- Written by: Anuruddha Jayasinghe
- Produced by: Swiss Lanka & Lucky Asia Films
- Starring: Upeksha Swarnamali; Vishwanath Kodikara; Mahendra Perera
- Cinematography: Channa Deshapriya
- Edited by: Ranesh Nanayakkara
- Music by: Ranga Dasanayaka
- Distributed by: CEL Theatres
- Release date: 14 February 2013
- Country: Sri Lanka
- Language: Sinhala

Bomba Saha Rosa (Sinhala: බෝම්බ හා රෝස, lit. 'Bombs and Roses') is a 2013 Sri Lankan Sinhala romantic thriller film directed by Anuruddha Jayasinghe and produced by Eric Kusum Markavitage for Swiss Lanka & Lycky Asia Films. It stars Upeksha Swarnamali and Vishwanath Kodikara in lead roles along with Mahendra Perera and Bimal Jayakody. Music composed by Ranga Dasanayaka. It is the 1244th Sri Lankan film in the Sinhala cinema. Supporting actor Tharindu Wijesinghe died before the screening of the film.

== Cast ==
- Upeksha Swarnamali as Shani
- Mahendra Perera as Gotta
- Bimal Jayakody as Mahil
- Darshan Dharmaraj as Nadan
- Vishwanath Kodikara as Nirmal
- Sriyani Amarasena
- Suminda Sirisena as Minister Daya
- Jayani Senanayake as Nandani
- Sampath Tennakoon as OIC
- Kumara Thirimadura as Freddy
- Pramudi Karunarathne as School girl
- Udayanthi Kulathunga as Subha
- Tharindu Wijesinghe as Damith
- Hisham Samsudeen as School boy
- Sampath Jayaweera as Tharaka
- Sarath Kothalawala as Silva
- Giriraj Kaushalya as Police seargent
- Dharmapriya Dias
- Kalana Gunasekara as Bura

== Soundtrack ==
No.	Title	Lyrics	Singer(s)	Length
1.	"Hanganna Bari Wewi Adare"	Kelum Srimal	Amal Perera, Devashree de Silva
