= Dekala Purudu Kenek =

2014 Sri Lankan film

- Directed by: Malith Hegoda
- Written by: Boopathy Nalin Wickramage
- Produced by: Vinode Films
- Starring: Bimal Jayakodi; Samadhi Laksiri
- Cinematography: M.D. Mahindapala
- Edited by: Malith Hegoda
- Music by: Ruwan Walpola
- Production company: Real Fiction Films
- Distributed by: Movies Works, CEL, Ridma Theaters
- Release dates: 23 August 2014 (World premiere-Montreal World Film Festival); 8 March 2019 (Sri Lanka)
- Running time: 133 mins
- Country: Sri Lanka
- Language: Sinhala

Dekala Purudu Kenek (Sinhala: දැකල පුරුදු කෙනෙක්; The Strange Familiar) is a 2019 Sri Lankan film directed by Malith Hegoda and co-produced by Lal Hegoda, Malith Hegoda, Rasanga Dissanayake, Mohamed Adamaly and Nadira Adamaly for Vinode Films. The film stars Bimal Jayakodi and Samadhi Laksiri in lead roles along with Jagath Manuwarna and Prasanna Mahagamage in supporting roles. It is the 1324th Sri Lankan film in the Sinhala cinema.

The film has received mostly positive reviews from critics. The script will be released at the Tower Foundation Auditorium on Wijerama Mawatha, Colombo on the evening of 18 March 2020.

== Plot ==
Dinithi tries very hard to communicate with her husband, but he ignores her presence relentlessly. The harder she tries to reach him, the deeper his silence becomes. Their 8-year-old daughter watches them. Her parents try to get involved but receive the same silent treatment from him. Dinithi doesn't work anymore. When she steps out of the house, it is only in pursuit of domestic chores, with the same taxi that has been arranged for her by her husband. That driver seems to be very friendly. Even Sanka, Dinithi's young cousin, who's staying with them seems to be overly friendly with her. One day, the husband is drawn into a road accident in which a pedestrian is killed. Dinithi rushes to his side, hoping to be of some help.

== Cast ==
- Samadhi Laksiri as Dinithi
- Bimal Jayakodi as Sachithra
- Jagath Manuwarna as Sanka
- Lakshman Mendis as Dinithi's Father
- Chamila Peiris as Dinithi's Mother
- Kaushalya Fernando as Sachithra's Mother
- Dayadewa Edirisinghe as Sachithra's Father
- Prasanna Mahagamage as Chamara
- Kushenya Sayumi Fonseka as Daughter
- Dilshani Perera as Dilrukshi as Dinithi's Sister
- Athula Pathirana as Pasindu
- Nadee Kammellaweera as Lahari
- Ananda Premalal as Baas
- Chaminda Sampath Jayaweera as Jagath
- Samanalee Fonseka as Sarini
- Ama Wijesekara as Ama
- Prasad Pereira as Prasad
- Kumuduni Wicramathanthri as Eeasha

== International screening ==
The film has been screened worldwide with positive reviews from critics.

- 58th BFI London Film Festival, Dare Strand - (European Premiere), United Kingdom 2014l
- Montreal World Film Festival, Canada 2014
- Seattle South Asian Film Festival, Tasveer, USA 2015
- Jogja-NETPAC Asian Film Festival, Indonesia 2015

== Awards and accolades ==
The film has receive worldwide nominations and awards at the film festivals.

- Golden Zenith Award (Nomination), First Film World Competition, Montreal World Film Festival, Canada 2014
- Jury Award for the Best Debut Feature - Jaffna International Cinema Festival, Sri Lanka 2015
- Golden Hanoman Award (Nomination) - Jogja-NETPAC Asian Film Festival, Indonesia 2015
- Most Promising Director - Cinema of Tomorrow - Derana Film Awards 2016
- Dr. Lester James Pieris Award, Sarasaviya Film Awards, 2018
