= Yaaluwoda? Yaaluida? =

2023 Sri Lankan romantic comedy fashion film

- Sinhala: යාලුවෝද? යාලුයි ද?
- Directed by: Dilshara Jayamanne
- Produced by: Rasitha Jinasena
- Starring: Eraj Gunewardane; Yureni Noshika; Shereen Willis
- Cinematography: Rangana S. Bandara; Hasitha Warnasuriya
- Edited by: Kavinda Mudalige
- Music by: Nishan Daniel
- Release date: 3 March 2023
- Country: Sri Lanka
- Language: Sinhala

Yaaluwoda? Yaaluida? (transl. Are We Still Friends?) (Sinhala: යාලුවෝද? යාලුයි ද?) is a 2023 Sri Lankan Sinhala-language romantic comedy fashion film written and directed by Dilshara Jayamanne. The film stars newcomers Eraj Gunewardane and Shereen Willis in the main lead roles. The film broke the norms of Sri Lankan Sinhala cinema by focusing on high-end fashion and became a changemaker in trying to create a paradigm shift in terms of cultural context. The film became Sri Lanka's first ever fashion theme film with the film focusing on the reality of modern Sri Lankan younger generation regarding their involvement in social media platforms such as TikTok and highlights their involvement in pop culture and music. The film had its theatrical release on 3 March 2023.

== Cast ==
- Eraj Gunewardane as Mithun
- Yureni Noshika
- Shereen Willis as Steffi
- Saranga Disasekara
- Dinakshie Priyasad
- Danu Innasithamby
- Mass Ramli
- Sarah Illyas as Minella
- Romaine Willis

== Production ==
The film was bankrolled by Starfish Neuro which is a prominent Sri Lankan content studio making premium content. Yureni Noshika was roped into play the main female antagonist role while Eraj Gunewardane and Shereen Willis both made their full-fledged acting debuts through this film. It was reported that Shereen Willis who played the main female lead role in the film was spotted by the executive producer of the film Harshini Kithulagoda when Harshini found Shereen's videos in TikTok. The film had a portion shot in anime sequence which was designed by Sejini Ratnayake and the film entered the record books to have been the first Sinhala film to have an anime sequence. The song titled Tharunai was recorded as an electronic dance music track and it marked another milestone in the Sinhala film industry with it being the first Sri Lankan Sinhala film to feature an electronic dance music track.

== See also ==
- List of Sri Lankan films of the 2020s
