= Aale Corona =

2021 Sri Lankan film

- Directed by: Sanjaya Nirmal
- Written by: U. A. Palliyaguru
- Produced by: Cloud Films
- Starring: Jehan Appuhamy; Dishni Rajapaksa; Wasantha Wittachchi; Deepani Silva
- Cinematography: Mahesh Ruwanpathirana
- Release date: 7 January 2021
- Country: Sri Lanka
- Language: Sinhala

Aale Corona is a 2021 Sri Lankan family drama film directed by Sanjaya Nirmal and produced by U. A. Palliyaguru for Cloud Films. It stars Jehan Appuhamy and Dishni Rajapaksa in the lead roles along with Wasantha Wittachchi, Deepani Silva, Buddhika Jayaratne in supportive roles. The film has shot in realistic style. FILL-T R and Adisha Beats composed rap music and Seneth Dayantha involved with rock songs in the film. The film was completed in just 17 days during the long COVID-19 epidemic season.

The film depicts a couple living alone during the COVID-19 period and their 42-day period. It also emphasis on experiences that led to the battle of life in the face of social and economic crisis. About 90% of the film's frames are shot in the same room.

The film has received negative reviews from critics.

== Cast ==
- Jehan Appuhamy as Sujan
- Dishni Rajapaksa as Tekla
- Wasantha Wittachchi as Police officer
- Deepani Silva as Servant
- Buddhika Jayaratne
