= Ashawari =

2022 Sri Lankan film

- Sinhala: ආශාවරී
- Directed by: Theja Iddamalgoda
- Written by: Saddha Mangala Sooriyabandara
- Story by: Theja Iddamalgoda
- Produced by: Theja Iddamalgoda
- Starring: Hemal Ranasinghe; Ishanka Jahanvi; Saranga Disasekara; Jayani Senanayake; Bimal Jayakody
- Cinematography: Ruwan Costa
- Edited by: Yashoda Danupama
- Music by: Suresh Maliyadde
- Release date: March 3, 2022; (Sri Lanka)
- Country: Sri Lanka
- Language: Sinhala

Ashawari (Sinhala: ආශාවරී) is a 2022 Sri Lankan Sinhala romantic film directed and produced by Theja Iddamalgoda for Media Vision Films in his directorial debut. The film stars Hemal Ranasinghe and newcomer Ishatka Jahanvi in lead role whereas Saranga Disasekara, Jayani Senanayake and Bimal Jayakody made supportive roles. It is the last film acted by veteran dramatist Jayalath Manoratne.

== Plot ==
The film centers on Ranesh Singhawansha, a young man from a wealthy upcountry family. While training at the Diyatalawa Military Academy, he falls in love with Ashavari, the youngest daughter of the Ohiya Station Master. The story unfolds through the conflict between their two families.

== Cast ==
- Hemal Ranasinghe as Ranesh Singhawansha
- Ishanka Jahanvi as Ashawari
- Jayalath Manoratne as Station master, Ashawari's father
- Jayani Senanayake as Rajini Subramanium, Ashawari's mother
- Saranga Disasekara as Ranesh's uncle
- Semini Iddamalgoda as Ranesh's mother
- Bimal Jayakody as Lasantha
- Priyankara Rathnayake
- Daya Wayaman
- Dinithi Walgamage as Ashawari's sister, Lasantha's love interest
- Lasantha Udukumbura as Lasantha's friend
- Ruvi Lakmali
- Danushka Dias
- Rohan Ranatunga

== Production ==
The Muhurath ceremony of the film was held in 2018 and shooting commenced from October 2018. This is the directorial debut for Theja Iddamalgoda who is more popular in advertising design. The film features several songs sung by Nirosha Virajini, Surendra Perera, Sanka Dineth and Upeka Nirmani. Lyrics penned by Kelum Srimal and Nandana Wickramage. In the film, art direction done by Sunil Premaratne, costume design by Lasantha Udakumbura and makeup by Indika Udara. Daminda D. Madawala and Indunil Deraniyagala are the assistant directors. The film was shot in Diyatalawa, Ohiya, Idalgashinna, Nuwara Eliya, Ambewela areas and Ranminitenna drama village.

== Release ==
The film was earlier set to be released in January 2022, but later confirmed to screen in theaters on March 3, 2022. Then the film is set to release in Canada, England, Australia, New Zealand and the United States in late March.
