= Deepani Silva =

Sri Lankan actress

- දීපානි සිල්වා
- Other name: Deepani de Silva
- Occupation: Actress
- Years active: 1975–present

Deepani Silva (Sinhala: දීපානි සිල්වා) also known as Deepani de Silva (Sinhala: දීපානි ධී සිල්වා) is a Sri Lankan popular veteran film and teledrama actress. She made it to the films after appearing in several street dramas and plays. On 28 May 2018, Deepani Silva was arrested and was released on bail for involving in an accident in Bandaragama.

== Biography ==
Deepani Silva is the only film artist in her family. Her father, D. Peter Silva was a trade union leader. She finished her higher education at the Buddhist Ladies' College which is situated in Colombo.

== Career ==
She started her acting career in 1975 through acting in street dramas. To learn her acting, Deepani joined veteran theatre actor Dhamma Jagoda's theatre school, Lionel Wendt Kala Kendra Ranga Shilpa Shalika which was inaugurated by Dhamma Jagoda as Sri Lanka's first ever theatre school. She learnt acting in the Ranga Shilpa Shalika from late Gamini Haththotuwegama who is still considered as the father of Sri Lankan street theatre.

She acted in several teledrama serials including Doo Daruwo, Ammai Thaththai, Hathpana, Lokke Mama, Abuddassa Kolama, Thanradevi in the early 1990s before gaining opportunities to step her foot in Sinhala film industry. Deepani Silva made her film debut in 1994 through Mee Haraka.

Deepani also acted in supportive roles during her career including her role as the mother of spoilt son in the 2008 blockbuster film, Machan which portrays the real story of the Sri Lankan handball team which disappeared in 2004 in Germany. She also featured in as one of the members of the cast in the 2018 horror film, Seya which is historically the first all-female featured movie in Sri Lankan film industry.

== Arrest ==
On 28 May 2018 (Monday) by the time when she was driving the car, she was reported to have met with an accident in the Bandaragama-Kesbewa road in the morning around 6.40am by colliding with a three wheeler. She was charged by the Bandaragama Police and was arrested in connection with the accident which also resulted in critical injuries to a 10-year-old girl who travelled with her father in the three-wheeler. On the same day, she was produced before the Panadura Magistrate and was released on bail with strict conditions. The Magistrate Court also ordered to impound the driving license of Deepani Silva and released her by imposing a personal surety of Rs. 200, 000.

== Filmography ==
Year	Film	Role	Ref.
1994	Mee Haraka		
1995	Ayoma		
1996	Manamohini		
1996	Thunweni Ehe		
2000	Thisaravi		
2001	Oba Magema Wewa		
2002	Seethala Gini Kandu		
2002	Sudu Salu		
2006	Rana Hansi		
2008	Machan	Spoilt son's mother	
2008	Walapatala	Nurse	
2008	Heart FM	Granny's servant	
2017	Ali Kathawa	God beseecher	
2018	Seya	Elsina	
2018	Ginnen Upan Seethala	Wijeweera's mother	
2019	Bhavatharana		
2021	Aale Corona	Servant	

=== Selected television series ===
- Amanda
- Ammai Thaththai
- Badda Addara
- Bodima
- Dandubasnamanaya
- Dedunu Paalama
- Doo Daruwo
- Hiruta Horen
- Humalaya
- Lalai Lilai Lai
- Lokke Mama
- Piththala Konderuma
- Rathu Rosa
- Ruwan Maliga
- Sakala Guru
- Sandagala Thenna
- Sunera Gira Sasala Wiya
- Thamba Pata Handewa
- Thara Devi
- Wanawadule Wasanthaya
- Wehi Pabalu Sela

== See also ==
- List of Sri Lankan actors
