= Our Mother, Grandmother, Prime Minister: Sirimavo =

- Directed by: Anomaa Rajakaruna
- Produced by: Agenda 14
- Starring: Sunethra Bandaranaike; Chandrika Kumaratunga
- Cinematography: Kularuwan Gamage; Samantha Dasanayake; Sanjay Dalugoda
- Edited by: Saman Alvitigala
- Music by: Chinthaka Jayakody
- Release date: 21 July 2023
- Running time: 83 minutes
- Country: Sri Lanka
- Languages: English, Sinhalese

Our Mother, Grandmother, Prime Minister: Sirimavo (Sinhala: අපේ අම්මා, අත්තම්මා, අගමැතිනිය : සිරිමාවෝ) is a 2023 documentary film directed by Anomaa Rajakaruna. The film chronicles the life of Sirimavo Bandaranaike, the first female prime minister of Sri Lanka and the first democratically elected female head-of-government in world history.

The film tells her life story as three-time Prime Minister of Sri Lanka, following the assassination of her husband, S.W.R.D. Bandaranaike. It is portrayed through conversations with her two daughters, Sunethra Bandaranaike and former President Chandrika Kumaratunga, as well as two of her grandchildren. The film also contains personal accounts from long-standing members of the Ceylon Administrative Service, who were part of her cabinet.

The film released on 21 July 2023. It won Best Documentary at the 21st Dhaka International Film Festival.
