= Uthuru Sulanga =

- Sinhala: උතුරු සුළඟ
- Directed by: Chamara Janaraj Peiris
- Written by: Chamara Janaraj Peiris
- Produced by: Pix and Words Productions
- Starring: Eranga Jeewantha; Kavindya Dulshani; Sriyantha Mendis; Dulan Manjula Liyanage; Sujani Menaka; Bimal Jayakodi
- Cinematography: Kapila Sugath Wijayaratna
- Edited by: Sudesh Kumarasinghe
- Music by: Udara Jayakodi
- Distributed by: LFD Theaters
- Release dates: 23 April 2021 (Liberty Cinema); 24 March 2023 (Nationwide)
- Country: Sri Lanka
- Language: Sinhala

Uthuru Sulanga (Sinhala: උතුරු සුළඟ; lit. 'Winds of Change') is a 2023 Sri Lankan Sinhala post-war drama thriller film directed by Chamara Janaraj Peiris in his directorial cinema debut and co-produced by director himself with Muhammad Ghani, Rasitha Jinasena and Kapila Nawarathna for Pics and Words Productions. It stars Eranga Jeewantha and Kavindya Dulshani in lead roles along with Sriyantha Mendis, Sujani Menaka and Bimal Jayakodi, Dulan Manjula Liyanage in supportive roles.

The first phase of the filming was shot in Uswewa village, Anamaduwa. The media screening was screened at Tharangani Cinema Hall on 14 January 2021. The premiere was held on 23 April 2021 at the Liberty Cinema. It was earlier planned to screen on 5 March 2021. However, it was later announced that the film will be released on 29 April 2021. The media screening was screened at Scope Cinema CCC on 20 March 2021. It was earlier planned to screen on 29 April 2021. However, it was later announced that the film will be released 24 March 2023.

== Plot ==
Uthuru Sulanga unfolds an unknown side of life of a person who seeks refuge in a then boarder village in the dry zone of Sri Lanka. The village has just buried all the memories of the staggering Northern war. He (Sunimal) finds shelter in the house of chieftain of the village ‘Ralahami mama’ who does not bother about his past but present. Sunimal whilst trying hard to get over his indelible memories of war, faces his second battle of life as he couldn't resist the charm of Yasho, Ralahami mama's daughter. When he loses his battle, the dark shadows of an unforeseen future surrounds him....again. Yet he has to discover himself, his real family and his future.

== Cast ==
- Eranga Jeewantha as Sunimal
- Kavindya Dulshani as Yashodara
- Sriyantha Mendis as Ralahamy Mama
- Dulan Manjula Liyanage as Veere
- Kasuni Kavindi
- Sujani Menaka
- Sulakkhana Herath
- Bimal Jayakodi
- Rohana Beddage
- Meena Kumari
- Dilhani Ekanayake
- Sanath Gunathilake

== Soundtrack ==
The music for Uthuru Sulanga was composed by Udara Jayakody, with lyrics written by Thushani Bulumulle.

== Release ==
Filming was complete by 2021, when the film was supposed to receive theatrical release, which was postponed to 24 March 2023. However, a press screening had taken place on 20 March 2021.
