= Jayani Senanayake =

Sri Lankan actress (born 1974)

Jayani Senanayake ජයනි සේනානායක
- Born: Kapuwela Vidanage Senanayake Mudiyanselage Jayani Chamathka Dharmadasa Senanayake; February 1, 1975 (age 51); Anuradhapura, Sri Lanka
- Other name: Jayani Senanayake
- Education: Niwanthakachethiya Maha Vidyalaya; University of the Visual and Performing Arts
- Occupation: Actress
- Years active: 1997–present
- Spouse: Sanjeewa Illeperuma

Kapuwela Vidanage Senanayake Mudiyanselage Jayani Chamathka Dharmadasa Senanayake (born as ජයනි සේනානායක; February 1, 1974), popularly known as Jayani Senanayake, is an actress in Sri Lankan cinema, theater and television. Highly versatile actress in drama and comedy, she is best known for the roles in films Sulang Kirilli, Walapatala and Goal.

== Personal life ==
Senanayake started education from Sri Sumangala Maha Vidyalaya, Anuradhapura. Then she went to Dhammdinna Vidyalaya, Galkulama and finally completed from Niwanthakachethiya Vidyalaya, Anuradhapura.

== Acting career ==
She started to act in stage drama while at the school, where she won the award for the best actress in North Central Drama festival. Then, Senanayake joined with M. Dharmasena to act in his play Wera. Her major breakthrough in theater came under Wasantha Dukgannarala during university times.

Her maiden cinematic experience came through 2001 film Mathu Yam Dawasa directed by Dharmasena Pathiraja.

=== Selected television serials ===
- Ado
- Anavaratha
- Angani
- Arungal
- Bogala Sawundiris
- Chalo
- Chandi Kumarihami
- Dhawala Kanya
- Dhawala Yamaya
- Diya Yata Gini
- Ehipillamak Yata
- Isisara Isawwa
- Jeewithaya Horu Aran
- Kampitha Vil
- Maya Roo
- Me Wasantha Kalayay
- Meeduma (2003)
- Meedum Amma
- Nonimi Yathra
- Paara Wasaa Aetha
- Pateelage Kathawa
- Pinkama (single episode)
- Rata Pawula
- Rathi Virathi
- Sadgunakaraya
- Sadisi Tharanaya
- Sanda Amawakai
- Sedona
- Sihinayak Wage
- Sindu Kiyana Una Pandura
- Siyapath Arama
- Suddilage Kathawa
- Sulanga Maha Meraka
- Tharu Ahasata Adarei
- Three-wheel Malli
- Wara Peraliya
- Weeraya Gedara Awith
- Weten Eha

=== Selected stage dramas ===
- Bakamuna Weedi Basi
- Debiddo
- Horu Samaga Heluwen
- Miss Yulee
- Saadaya Maarai Salli Hamarai
- Sihina Horu Aran
- Siriwardena Pawula
- Weeraya Merila
- Wera

== Filmography ==
Key
†	Denotes films that have not yet been released

Year	Film	Role	Ref.
2001	Mathu Yam Dawasa		
2002	Agnidahaya		
2003	Sudu Kaluwara	Heen Manike's mother	
2003	Sulang Kirilli	Violet	
2004	Gini Kirilli		
2004	Sooriya Arana	Sediris's concubine	
2005	Aksharaya	Servant	
2006	Bherunda Pakshiya		
2007	Nisala Gira	Female Jailor	
2008	Machan	Jasmine	
2008	Akasa Kusum	Leela	
2008	Walapatala	Sumana	
2009	Bindu	Gune's wife	
2010	Sthuthi Nawatha Enna	Malkanthi	
2011	Mahindagamanaya	Servant	
2011	Gamani	Head Grama Arakshaka's wife	
2011	Selvam	Vijitha	
2012	Colour		
2012	Mouse	Servant	
2013	Bomba Saha Rosa	Pocket Nandani	
2013	Siri Parakum	Gama Hamine	
2015	Bora Diya Pokuna		
2015	Sinahawa Atharin	Kanthi	
2015	Maharaja Ajasath		
2015	Ho Gaana Pokuna	Chithra, Gramasevaka's wife	
2016	Cindrella		
2016	Puthandiya	Dharme's wife	
2017	Heena Hoyana Samanallu	Village teacher	
2017	A Level	Sylvia Fernando	
2018	Goal	Tharindu's mother	
2018	Udumbara	Udumbara's mother	
2021	Kawuruth Danne Na		
2022	Hithumathe Jeewithe	Sumathipala's mother	
2022	Ashawari	Rajini Subramanium	
2023	Kandak Sema		
2023	Kathuru Mithuru	Wilson's wife	
2023	Nattami Army	Kanthi	
2024	Minnu		
TBA	Angara †		
TBA	Nuhuru Vaeyama †		
TBA	Amuthu Gurukamak †		
TBA	Amuthu 3k †		
TBA	O.I.C Gadafi †		
TBA	Rapist †		
TBA	Number Plate †		

== Awards and accolades ==
She has won several awards at the local stage drama festivals and television festivals.

=== Bunka Cultural Awards ===
Year	Nominee / work	Award	Result
2009	Performance in Drama	Honour Award	Won

=== Sumathi Awards ===
Year	Nominee / work	Award	Result
2013	Me Wasantha Kalayay	Merit Award	Won
