= Father (2026 film) =

2026 Sri Lankan film

- Sinhala: ෆාදර්
- Directed by: Chaminda Jayasuriya
- Written by: Chamara Kodithuwakku
- Based on: True story
- Produced by: Dr. Shantha Geethadeva
- Starring: Poojana Dandeniya; Saumya Liyanage; Bimal Jayakody; Dilhani Ekanayake; Jagath Manuwarna; Shyam Fernando; Chandani Seneviratne; Sarath Kothalawala; Sanath Wimalasiri; Suraj Mapa
- Cinematography: Vishwajith Karunaratne
- Edited by: Sithum Samarajeewa
- Music by: Chinthaka Jayakody
- Production company: Emika Productions
- Release date: January 9, 2026
- Running time: 1h 56minutes
- Country: Sri Lanka
- Language: Sinhala
- Box office: 250 Million LKR

Father (Sinhala: ෆාදර්) is a 2026 Sri Lankan Sinhala gangster film directed by Chaminda Jayasuriya and produced by Dr. Shantha Geethadeva for Emica Productions. The film is based on a series of true events revolved around the gangster Gampaha Osmond, that occurred between the 1976 and 1991 in Sri Lanka. The film stars Poojana Dandeniya in lead role with an ensemble cast of Saumya Liyanage, Bimal Jayakody, Dilhani Ekanayake, Jagath Manuwarna, Shyam Fernando, Chandani Seneviratne, Sarath Kothalawala, Sanath Wimalasiri and Suraj Mapa.

The film passed the 100 million LKR box office revenue mark in just 17 days of screening and grossed 250 million LKR worldwide within 25 days of its release.

== Plot ==
Set in the Gampaha district during a turbulent era of political upheaval, the story follows Desmond Gunasekara (played by Poojana Dandeniya), a deeply religious young man from an ordinary family. Desmond is preparing to leave the village for police training, but his life takes a drastic turn due to the local illicit liquor trade and extortion rackets run by a powerful gang leader named Gnane.

When one of Gnane’s thugs, Muniya, provokes and threatens Desmond's friends, tensions boil over. Muniya returns seeking revenge, and in a cocktail of fear and rage, Desmond strikes him down with a pole. This single act of violence lands Desmond in prison and alters the course of his life forever, stripping away his dreams of a peaceful future.

Upon his release, Desmond finds himself permanently targeted. Gnane, driven by ego and paranoia, becomes obsessed with eliminating Desmond and his circle before they grow powerful enough to challenge his empire.

The situation escalates heavily when Gnane orchestrates local communal violence to win the favor of his political handler—a prominent Provincial Council Minister. Eager to please Gnane, the Minister and his son-in-law, a local Police Officer (OIC Dhammika), begin leveraging state power to ruthlessly hunt down and terrorize Desmond's group.

Pushed to the brink, Desmond transitions into a hardened figure to survive. He secretly secures firearms smuggled into his marketplace fish stall and launches a massive counter-offensive. He successfully kills Gnane and several key gang members before fleeing the country to seek refuge in Japan.

However, his escape triggers an incredibly dark wave of state and political retaliation back home. The Police and political actors brutally target the families left behind. This culminates in the abduction, horrific torture, and murder of seven youths—including Desmond's only brother—who are set on fire (reflecting the real-life historical atrocities associated with the Wavulkele killings).

The news of his brother's and friends' gruesome deaths reaches a devastated Desmond in Japan. The film does not conclude with a traditional cinematic triumph, but rather a somber reflection on the cyclical nature of corruption. While the architects of the violence—the corrupt police officer and the politician—eventually face fatal consequences for their actions, the movie ends on a tragic note, showing how unchecked political power and violence ultimately consume everyone in their path.

== Cast ==
- Poojana Dandeniya as Desmond aka young Osmond Gunasekara
- Saumya Liyanage as older Desmond
- Bimal Jayakody as Dhammika Prasanna Chandrasena, OIC
- Dilhani Ekanayake as older Sandalatha
- Anushki Premachandra as young Sandalatha
- Jagath Manuwarna as Gnandasa 'Gnane' Wickramage
- Shyam Fernando as Michael Fernando
- Chandani Seneviratne as Osmond's mother
- Sarath Kothalawala as Wilson, Osmond's father
- Sanath Wimalasiri as Police OIC Ranathunga
- Suraj Mapa as Warsuwa
- Anjana Premaratne as Gnane's henchman
- Koralage Saman as Charlie
- Niranjani Shanmugaraja
- Sanjeewa Dissanayake
- Xavier Kanishka as Leslie
- Suneth Chitrananda as Saliya, Vaada Baila announcer
- Gaminda Priyaviraj as lawyer of Dhammika
- Sisira Thadikara as Gnane's uncle
- Akalanka Prabhaswara
- Ama Wijesekera as Dhammika's wife
- Sandun Priyankara as Nevil
- Manju Mudalige
- Maleesha Sewmini Uduwara as Desmond's youngest sister
- Manoja Fernando as Desmond's sister
- Ruwan Madanayake as Gnane's henchman
- Janet Anthony as Baila singer
- Chanaka Bandara as Palitha
- Janaka Ranasinghe as Gnane's henchman
- Vihanga Wijesekera
- Pasan Ranaweera as Sekara
- Lakruwan Withanage

== Production ==
This the maiden film direction by Chaminda Jayasuriya, who is an actor and journalist. The film is produced by Dr. Shantha Geethadeva and screenplay by Chamara Kodithuwakku. Wimal Ketapearachchi, Chamal Polwattage, Vishwajith Karunaratne and Chaminda Jayasuriya handled script doctoring. The script writing done by Wimal Ketapearachchi and Chamal Polwattage.

Vishwajith Karunaratne handled cinematography with the assistance of Kasun Chamara, Dileepa Rangana Amarasinghe, Manoj Sampath and Saheesha Thamod. Prathika Hewapathirana is the second camera operator. Assistant directors are Udaya Prasanna, Chamal Polwattage, Vishwa Prabuddha, Damindu S Karunaratne and Vidhu Upek Jayasuriya. Dialogue recording done by Pubudu Dhananjaya Wanigasekera, still photography by Chamara Kahatapitiyage and lighting by Imal Chathuranga, Kanishka Mandara and Amila Suneth.

Production design done by Dhammika Hewaduwatte, Sound designed by Priyantha Kaluarachchi, whereas editing and post-production coordination done by Sithum Samarajeewa. Sanjeewa Dassanayake and Nalin Hewaduwatte are the art directors. Production management handled by Ronith Adhikari with the assistance of Charith Gamage. Costume designed by Sawan Pavithra, makeup by Priyantha S. Wanninayake, Hair styling by Leslie Seram and color combination by Ananda Banadara.

Music directed by Chinthaka Jayakody with composition assistance by Ravindra Sampath Yapahuwa. Lyricists are Wimal Ketapearachchi, Chamal Polwattage and Anusha Shivalingam, whereas Chamara Weerasinghe, Niranjala Manjari, Peter Rosairo, Kanchana Anuradhi, Janet Anthony, Sarath Karunaratne, Sanjeewa Dissanayake and Manjula Mudalige made background vocals. The film marked Chamara Weerasinghe's maiden background singing in his 25 years of musical life.

The film's launch was held at the Taj Samudra Hotel in Colombo. Most of the film shooting completed in Ranminithenna telecinema village. The trailer and website of the film was released in October 2025.

The film was released on 9 January 2026.

== Reception ==
Ceylon Today praised the plot, direction and cast. "This film, with a biopic style and a period setting, is a profound discussion of the question of ‘justice’ in the face of political structures and their social implications.", wrote Suren Raghavan.
