= Puththi Ketta Manitharellam =

2021 drama thriller film directed by Raj Sivaraj

- Directed by: Raj Sivaraj
- Written by: Raj Sivaraj
- Produced by: Kirush Shoban
- Starring: Aravindan; Athi; Sathiyajith
- Cinematography: Thirugnanam Tharmalingam
- Edited by: Arun Yogathasan
- Music by: Poovan Matheesan
- Release date: 24 December 2021
- Running time: 91 minutes
- Country: Sri Lanka
- Language: Tamil

Puththi Ketta Manitharellam (Tamil: புத்திகெட்ட மனிதர் எல்லாம்) is a 2021 Sri Lankan Tamil language drama thriller film written and directed by Raj Sivaraj in his feature film directorial debut. The film stars actors who have featured in popular YouTube channels such as Petrol Shed and Poovan Media. It features Aravindan, Athi, Sathiyajith and Thilakshan in pivotal roles. The film was bankrolled by Blackboard International and music is scored by Poovan Matheesan. The film had its theatrical release on 24 December 2021 opened to positive reviews and was a success. This was also the first major Sri Lankan Tamil film to hit the screens since the release of black comedy film Komaali Kings in 2018.

== Cast ==
- Aravindan as Arun
- Athi as Thiru
- Sathiyajith as Mathan
- Sabil Raaj as Vijay Bahubali
- Thilakshan as Ushanth
- Kanna as Kanna
- Sinthuja as Sayanthavi
- Ithayaraj as Siva Sir
- Kokulan as Kiri

== Soundtrack ==
The songs and background score for this film has been composed by Poovan Matheesan a well known indie artist debuting as a music director for a featured film . This is a debut film for the singers as well. All the lyrics were penned by K.S.Shanthakumar.

No.	Title	Lyrics	Singer(s)	Length
1.	"Thaniyaa Vaarom"	K.S.Shanthakumar	Dayas Mohanadas
2.	"Unai Naanum"	K.S.Shanthakumar	Kajan Selvarasa
3.	"Evil Theme"	K.S.Shanthakumar	Tharmalingam, Sathiyan, Poovan Matheesan
4.	"Ninaikkinra Yaavum - Female"	K.S.Shanthakumar	Sivaloganathan Madona
5.	"Ninaikkinra Yaavum - Male (Bonus Track)"	K.S.Shanthakumar	Poovan Matheesan

== Release ==
The film was premiered in various theatres across Jaffna on 24 December, 25 December and 26 December.

== Awards and nominations ==
Year	Award	Category	Nominee	Result	Ref.
2022	Norway Tamil Film Festival	Best Actress	Sinthuja	Won	
2022	Norway Tamil Film Festival	Best Cinematography	Thirugnanam Tharmalingam	Won	
2022	Norway Tamil Film Festival	Best Music Director	Poovan Matheesan	Won	
2022	Norway Tamil Film Festival	Best Screenplay	Sivaraj	Won	
