= Kambili (film) =

Kambili කම්බිලි
- Promotional poster
- Directed by: Prasad Kalupahana
- Written by: Niduk Madhushitha
- Produced by: Nishantha Galhena
- Starring: Amila Karunanayake; Nethmi Roshel; Nita Fernando; Bimal Jayakody; Koralage Saman
- Cinematography: Pushphitha Nirmal Surige
- Edited by: Anura Bandara
- Music by: Dilshan L. Silva
- Distributed by: EAP Theatres
- Release date: 8 August 2024
- Country: Sri Lanka
- Language: Sinhala

Kambili (Sinhala: කම්බිලි) a 2024 Sri Lankan Sinhala thriller drama film directed by Prasad Kalupahana and produced by Nishantha Galhena for YaYu Entertainment. It stars Amila Karunanayake and Nethmi Roshel in the lead role along with Nita Fernando, Bimal Jayakody and Koralage Saman in supportive roles. Popular television actor Dev Surendra and popular social media comedian Janitha Rupasena made debut cinema acting with the film.

== Cast ==
- Amila Karunanayake as Bhanuka
- Nethmi Roshel as Samadhi
- Nita Fernando as Lalitha Amma
- Bimal Jayakody as Wickramasinghe, Ayurveda doctor
- Dharmapriya Dias
- Sanath Gunathilake (cameo)
- Sujani Menaka
- Samitha Sudeeswara
- Dev Surendra as Kalana
- Koralage Saman as Titus
- Janitha Rupasena
- Anjana Premaratne
- Teena Shanel
- Gaminda Aponsu
- Veenu Perera
- Pramila Thenujana
- Nayani Ramanayake
- Sugath Janaka
- Amila Chinthaka Gamage
- Rangana Jayathilake
- Newton Vidanapathirana
- Damithu Duke Fernando in minor role

== Production ==
The film marked the debut cinema direction for Prasad Kalupahana, who is active in the media industry as a media platformer and a director of commercials. Screenplay by Niduk Madhushitha, production by Nishantha Galhena, where executive production by Champika De Silva. Cinematography done by Pushphitha Nirmal Surige and editing by Anura Bandara. Sanduni Kavindya Jayapatma is the assistant director and Ananda Bandara made the color combination. Voice design and tone teaching handled by Sashin Juman Perera, whereas art direction and costume designed by Sanjeeva Karunaratne. Composition done by Supun Stenwall and Rasika Prabath made choreography. Product management include Niduk Madushita and Harshan Praboth Jayasekara. Wasantha Kumaravila is the stunt director, and Kanishka Madhuranga Alvis made special visual effects. Music Direction made by Dilshan L. Silva, lyrics by Lasitha Jayaneththi Arachchige and song composition by Dilshan L. Silva and Dilipa Saranga. Singers Bachi Susan, Kanchana Anuradhi, Raini Charuka, Ishaan Lantra, Senanayake Weraliyadda, Tashni Perera, Gayan Gunawardena and Vimansha Dilhani background vocals.

The Muhurath ceremony was held on 28 March 2023 at Bellanwila Rajamaha Viharaya.

== Release ==
The film was released on 9 August 2024 in EAP cinema theatres.
