= MonaLisa =

2022 Sri Lankan film

- Sinhala: මොනාලිසා
- Directed by: Eranga Senarathna
- Written by: Eranga Senarathna
- Produced by: Champika De Silva; Nishantha Galhena
- Starring: Madushani Wickramasinghe [Amila Karunanayake; Buddhika Jayarathne; Sulochana Weerasinghe
- Cinematography: Upul Priyan
- Edited by: Anusha Jayawardhana
- Music by: Nmj Vacylavo
- Production company: YAYU Entertainment
- Distributed by: MPI Theatres
- Release date: February 18, 2022
- Country: Sri Lanka
- Language: Sinhala

MonaLisa (Sinhala: මොනාලිසා) is a 2022 Sri Lankan Sinhala-language drama film directed by Eranga Senarathna and co-produced by Champika De Silva and Nishantha Galhena for YAYU Entertainment. The film stars Madushani Wickramasinghe and [Amila Karunanayake in lead roles whereas Buddhika Jayarathne, Sulochana Weerasinghe and Susanga Kahadawalarachchi made supportive roles.

== Plot ==
The story revolves around a beautiful young girl named Kalpana. She comes to Colombo from a remote village to improve her dancing skills but she tries to commit suicide as a result of a relationship she has with a married man. Her life starts to change because of a young man named Madhuwantha whom she meets just moments before she commits suicide.

== Cast ==
- Buddhika Jayarathne as Nalin
- Amila Karunanayake as Madhuwantha
- Madushani Wickramasinghe as Kalpana
- Sulochana Weerasinghe as Ayomi, Nalin's wife
- Susanga Kahadawalarachchi as Madhuwantha's friend
- Kusum Perera
- Rinsly Weerarathne

== Production ==
Eranga Senaratne is the director and screenwriter of this artistic film where he previously made commercial films such as Surayahana Gini Gani, Ginigath Madhusamaya, Rosa Patikki, Sinasuna Adaren, Sweet Angel, and None Mage Sudu None. Surya Dayaruwan and Bhashi Madhubashini made playback singing to the music composed by Nmj Vacylavo and lyrics by Dinali Roshanthi Senaratne. A professional model Madushani Wickramasinghe made his debut cinema acting with the film. Although filming began during the COVID-19 pandemic season around Colombo for the main scenes, a number of scenes were used islandwide for the rest of the filming.

Upul Priyan is the cinematographer and Gayan Mahagalage is the assistant director, Anusha Jayawardena is the editor, Shan Alwis is the color director and Sanka Prasad is the choreographer. Janadara Aluthgamage is the feature writer, Chapa Perera is the art director, Anuruddha Basnayake is the sound designer and 5.1 mixing audio engineer.

== Release ==
The filming commenced in June 2021 and production completed on January 18, 2022. A special screening of the film was held on 26 January 2022 at the Scope Cinema in Colombo City Center. At the event, Senaratne released four trailers of his coming soon films: Nilu Man Adarai, Adarai Janu, Mona Lisa and Ae. This is the first time that four pre-promotional films of the same director have been screened. The film was released on 18 February 2022 in nearly 15 cinemas islandwide.
