= Shehani Kahandawala =

Sri Lankan television actress, model, TV host

Shehani Kahandawala ෂෙහානි කහඳවල
- Born: 24 February 1995 (age 31); Colombo, Sri Lanka
- Occupations: Actress; model; singer; TV host
- Years active: 2013–present
- Height: 5 ft (152 cm)
- Parents: Wasantha Kahandawala (father); Thamara Perera (mother)

Shehani Kahandawala (Sinhala: ෂෙහානි කහඳවල; born 24 February 1995), is an actress in Sri Lankan television as well as a television host, singer and model. Started as a child television presenter, she later became one of the popular actresses in the television with the serials Sujatha, Sanda Pini Wassa and Sihini.

== Personal life ==
She was born on 24 February 1995 in Colombo as the only child of the family. Her father is Wasantha Kahandawala and her mother Thamara Perera is a housewife. During school period, she never appeared in any drama or music activity. In school however, she studied music as a subject up to A/L. Her grandmother was good at singing as well as her father.

== Career ==
In 2013, Shehani started her career as a freelance television presenter in TV Derana and hosted the children's program Trim Trim. During the same period, she appeared in the music video Oba Ma Hamuwuna Da sung by Sashika Nisansala. With the song, she became very popular among the public, where she continued to appear in number of music videos in the following years. Then in the same year, she made her television debut with the television serial Acid directed by Chamara Janaraj Peiris and played the role "Senuri".

In 2015, she was invited to act in the television serial Sujatha as a replacement for Nehara Peiris who previously played the title role. In the serial, she played the titular role "Sujatha" which gained huge popularity. The serial became her turning point of the acting career. In 2016, she acted in the serial Warna. In 2017, she appeared in the serial Sanda Pini Wassa and played the role "Madhavee". In the same year, she worked as the host of reality show Hiru Super Hero aired in Hiru TV. Then she joined the cast of comedy serial Mal Hathai and played the role "Ashawari".

In 2018, she participated in season 2 of the reality show Hiru Mega Stars. In the same year, she starred in two television serials: Nebaraya and Package. Meanwhile, in 2019, she became the official LUX ambassador for Sri Lanka where she participated for the workshop held in the United Kingdom. In the same year, she appeared in the music video "Mihiravi" sung by Romesh Sugathapala. Then she got the opportunity to appear in a Hindi song "Anjaana" sung by Bollywood singer Rajdeep Chatterjee.

In 2020, she made the lead role in the television soap opera Sihini with the title role.

== Television serials ==
Year	Film	Role	Ref.
2014	Acid	Senuri	
2015-16	Sujatha	Sujatha	
2016	Warna		
2016	Mal Hathai	Ashawari	
2017	Sanda Pini Wessa	Madhavee	
2018	Nebaraya		
2018	Package		
2020	Sihini	Sihini	
2022	Paara Wasaa Atha		
2023	Salli Pokuru	Nishi	

== Music video appearances ==
- Oba Ma Hamuwunu Da - Sashika Nisansala
- Anjaana - Rajdeep Chatterjee
- Mihiravi - Romesh Sugathapala
- Ikman Wela - Sajeewa Dissanayake
- Ahimi Nethu Aga - Athma Liyanage
- Wediyenma Man Adare Kale - Sameera Madusanka
- Mayam Kalawe - Nadimal Perera
