= Sujani Menaka =

Sri Lankan actress and model (born 1980)

- සුජානි මේනකා
- Born: Samarawickrama Dahanayake Sujani Menaka; May 17, 1979 (age 47); Colombo
- Occupations: Actress, model
- Years active: 1987–present
- Spouse: Bimal Jayakody (m. 2007)
- Relatives: Rathna Lalani Jayakody (Bimal's aunt); Sampath Tennakoon (Bimal's uncle); Geetha Kanthi Jayakody (Bimal's aunt); Paboda Sandeepani (Bimal's cousin)

Samarawickrama Dahanayake Sujani Menaka (born 17 May 1980 as සුජානි මේනකා) [Sinhala]), popularly known as Sujani Menaka, is an actress in Sri Lankan cinema, theater and television. Started as a child artist in advertisements, she is best known for the role in NSB commercial Sathen Sathe and title role Sara in the teledrama as well as film adaptation.

== Personal life ==
Sujani Menaka was born on 17 May 1980. She is an old girl of St. Paul's Girls School, Milagiriya. Her father was an art director in films.

She is married to popular actor Bimal Jayakody. She met Bimal during the teledrama Ramya Suramya back in 2000. They married in 2007. The couple has two daughters and one son.

Bimal's father is the elder brother of popular actresses Geetha Kanthi Jayakody and Rathna Lalani Jayakody. Geetha's daughter Paboda Sandeepani is also a popular award-winning actress in cinema and television. Rathna Lalani is married to fellow actor Sampath Tennakoon.

== Career ==
She faced a camera at the age of 3 in Prarthana teledrama directed by maestro Lester James Peries. Then, at the age of 10, she was selected for the NSB commercial Sathe Sathe, which gain enormous popularity as a child artist. In 1987, she acted in her maiden cinematic role as a child artist in the film Ahinsa. Her stage drama Athurupasata Chat Ekak will be showing in future.

Her maiden cinematic experience came through as a child artist in 1987 film Ahinsa, directed by Malani Fonseka. Some of her popular films are Thrishule, Sathya and Sara.

=== Selected television serials ===
- Aluth Gedara as Diana
- Amanda as Meenu
- Api Api Wage
- Chakraangee
- Chandra Vinsathi
- Damini
- Dhawala Yamaya
- Diyaniyo as Hansi
- Gajamuthu
- Giraya
- Hiru Kumari
- Ira Awara
- Isi Dasuna
- Jodu Gedara as Suja
- Loba Nosidewa as Anagi
- Maya Roo
- Mayumi
- Mee Massa
- Pingala Danawwa
- Pork Veediya
- Prarthana
- Raahu
- Ramya Suramya
- Sadgunakaraya
- Samanalunta Wedithiyanna
- Sanda Dev Diyani
- Sandagalathenna
- Sanda Mudunata
- Sara as Sara
- Sasandara
- Senehasa Kaviyak
- Tharu Kumari
- Udu Sulanga
- Upuli as Upuli
- Vinivindimi Andura
- Vishwanthari
- Yaso Mandira

=== Selected stage dramas ===
- Athurupasata Chat Ekak
- Deseeya Thunseeya

== Filmography ==
Key
†	Denotes films that have not yet been released

Year	Film	Role	Ref.
1987	Ahinsa	Mary's daughter	
1991	Raja Sellam		
1991	Mama Obe Hithawatha		
1992	Raja Daruwo		
1992	Kulageya	Mervyn's daughter	
1992	Sathya		
1993	Thrishule		
1994	150 Mulleriyawa	Virindu newspaper hawker's daughter	
1998	Julietge Bhumikawa	Saroja's servant	
2010	Sara	Sara	
2011	Gamani	Upul's lover	
2021	Uthuru Sulanga		
2024	Weerya	Sachini	
2024	Minnu		
2024	Kambili		
2025	Theja		
TBA	Magam Soli †		
TBA	Rapist †		

== Awards and accolades ==
She has won several awards at the local stage drama festivals and television festivals.
