= Kamal Deshapriya =

Sri Lankan actor

Kamal Deshapriya කමල් දේශප්‍රිය
- Born: 30 November
- Education: Nalanda College, Colombo
- Occupations: Actor, dramatist, announcer, commentator
- Parents: Ananda Sirisena (father); Agnes Tissera (mother)

Kamal Deshapriya Sirisena (Sinhala: කමල් දේශප්‍රිය), is an actor in Sri Lankan cinema and television, as well as a television host, cricket commentator and media personality.

== Personal life ==
His father Ananda Sirisena was a radio artist. His mother Agnes Tissera (b. 1928) was an actress and radio artist. He completed education from Nalanda College, Colombo.

== Career ==
In 2017 he was appointed channel head of Sri Lanka Cricket (SLC). In February 2018 he resigned from the post by citing personal reasons. Several reports informed that the resignation was due to disputes over match telecasting rights with SLC deputy secretary, Ravin Wickramaratne. He also worked as a co-coordinating secretary of National Movement Against Terrorism (NMAT) and as the Sihala Urumaya Spokesman.

His first cinema acting role was in the 2014 film, Siri Daladagamanaya, directed by Sanath Abeysekara.

=== Selected television series ===
- Adaraya Gindarak
- Adara Wassa
- Adaraneeya Sithara
- Ahas Gawwa
- Anantha
- Angana
- Anichchawatha Sankara
- Asirimath Daladagamanaya
- Chaya
- Deweni Inima
- Deyyange Rate
- Isuru Sangramaya
- Maha Viru Pandu
- Mandaram Kathawe
- Nikini Kusum
- Piyavi
- Ran Dam Wal
- Sith Athara Histhan
- Susum Rasthiyaduwa
- Ralla Weralata Adarei
- Thodu

== Filmography ==
Key
†	Denotes films that have not yet been released

Year	Film	Role	Ref.
2014	Siri Daladagamanaya	King Giri Aba	
2016	Ulath Ekai Pilath Ekai	DIG, Gangu's father	
2018	Porisadaya	Wedisinghe	
2018	Bimba Devi Alias Yashodhara	King Suppabuddha	
2018	Nidahase Piya DS	Dudley Senanayake	
2025	Hello From the Other side		
2025	Soorya (film)		
TBA	Thanapathilage Gedara †		
TBA	Ruwan Tharuka †		
