= Paboda Sandeepani =

Sri Lankan actress

Paboda Sandeepani පබෝධා සන්දීපනී
- Born: Rashmini Paboda Sandeepani Pathirana; 16 January 1982 (age 44); Colombo, Sri Lanka
- Other name: Rashi Paba Sandeepani
- Occupation: Actress
- Years active: 1987-Present
- Spouse(s): Sidath Harindra (m. 2012 and separated)
- Children: 1
- Mother: Geetha Kanthi Jayakody
- Relatives: Rathna Lalani Jayakody (aunt); Sampath Tennakoon (uncle); Bimal Jayakody (cousin); Sujani Menaka (Bimal's wife); Yash Weerasinghe (cousin)
- Website: Paboda Sandeepani on Facebook

Rashmini Paboda Sandeepani Pathirana (born 16 January 1982) is a Sri Lankan cinema, theatre and television actress.

== Background ==
Sandeepani is the daughter of Sri Lankan actress Geetha Kanthi Jayakody. Her aunt Rathna Lalani Jayakody and uncle Sampath Tennakoon are also well known artists in Sri Lanka. Popular actor Bimal Jayakody is the son of Geetha Kanthi's elder brother. Bimal is married to fellow actress Sujani Menaka.

When Paboda was just five years old, she acted in the teledrama Yashorawaya with her mother Geetha Kanthi.

== Career ==
She entered the film industry at a very young age with the help of her mother. Though she acted in few films, she gain more attraction with television serials. In 2000, she entered Sinhala cinema with an uncredited role in the film Sanda Yahanata. Her most popular cinema acting came through Udayakantha Warnasuriya's film Bahubuthayo in which she played as the leading female antagonist with two popular actors Mahendra Perera and Rodney Warnakula.

=== Notable television works ===
- Adarawanthayo
- Anantha
- Boralu Para
- Deydunu Yanaya
- Diyaniyo
- Ekas Ginna
- Gini Dalu Meda
- Handuna Gaththoth Oba Ma
- Isuru Bawana
- Kasee Salu
- Mage Kaviya Mata Denna
- Mal Hathai
- Mayura Asapuwa
- Pabalu
- Pem Piyawara
- Peraliya
- Pingala Danawwa
- Sakarma
- Sakura Mal
- Samanala Sihinaya
- Sanakeliyay Maya
- Sathmahala
- Sivpath Rena
- Thuththiri
- Tharupaba
- Wassanaye Hiru Evidin

== Accolades ==
In 2011, Paboda won the Best Actress Awards for her leading role in the television serial Pingala Danawwa at the 7th Raigam Tele'es award ceremony. She also won best teledrama actress award at the 19th Sumathi Awards in 2014 for her role in television serial Boralu Para.

== Filmography ==
Key
†	Denotes films that have not yet been released

Year	Film	Role	Ref.
2000	Sanda Yahanata	Viveka's sister	
2002	Bahubuthayo	Tikiri	
2002	Wekande Walauwa	Aruni	
2011	Suseema	Suseema	
2012	Super Six	Sulo	
2013	Doni	Teacher (Cameo Role)	
2015	Gindari	Tikiri / Tikri	
2022	Gindari 2	Tikiri	
2023	Gajaman	Padami (voice)	
2023	Ruhire	Kamini	
2024	Sri Siddha	Sugula	
TBA	Yathra †		
TBA	Abheetha †		
TBA	Adare Aththamai †		
TBA	Mala Magulai †		
