= Sampath Tennakoon =

Sri Lankan actor (1959-2021)

- සම්පත් තෙන්නකෝන්
- Born: 20 June 1959; Colombo, Ceylon
- Died: 3 December 2021 (aged 62); Colombo, Sri Lanka
- Occupations: Actor, dramatist
- Years active: 1987–2021
- Spouse: Rathna Lalani Jayakody
- Relatives: Geetha Kanthi Jayakody (sister-in-law); Paboda Sandeepani (niece-in-law); Bimal Jayakody (nephew); Sujani Menaka (niece-in-law)

Sampath Tennakoon (20 June 1959 – 3 December 2021: සම්පත් තෙන්නකෝන් [Sinhala]), was an actor in Sri Lankan cinema, theater, and television.

== Personal life ==
Sampath Tennakoon was born on 20 June 1959. He was from Isipathana College, Colombo.

He was married to fellow actress Rathna Lalani Jayakody. They first met during a stage drama Puthra Samagama and then in Suba Sandewak. They have acted in more than 50 stage dramas together. Geetha Kanthi Jayakody is the sister of Rathna Lalani, who is a renowned award-winning actress in Sri Lankan cinema, theater and television. Popular actress Paboda Sandeepani is the daughter of her sister Geetha Kanthi. Popular actor Bimal Jayakody is the son of Rathna's elder brother. Bimal is married to fellow actress Sujani Menaka.

Tennakoon died on 3 December 2021, at the age of 62 while receiving treatment for lung cancer at a private hospital in Colombo. At his request, the funeral reportedly took place within 24 hours.

== Acting career ==
Neil Alles' acting is what makes Sampath, who has experienced the school stage, a passion for acting. Tennakoon usually went to Lumbini Theater to watch stage dramas. He first acted in the play Guru Lipi directed by Dayaratne Ratagedara and then in Ambu Samiyo by Douglas Siriwardena. He made his television debut with the children's teledrama Moragiri Kanda directed by Sisira Kotelawala. He acted in teledramas such as Sneha, Verona and Maha Viru Pandu.

In 2013, Rathna and Sampath organized a drama festival titled Abhinayana Sampath-Rathna Rangabhumika to celebrate their 30 years of stage drama career. They staged seven popular dramas from 17 to 23 December 2013 at New Town Hall, Colombo 7, in which they together acted.

=== Selected stage dramas ===
- 6457 (Sixty Four Fifty Seven)
- Deseeya Thunseeya
- Eka-Adhipathi
- Guru Tharuwa
- Jagan Ma
- Mala Walalu
- Mayadevi
- Puthra Samagama
- Romaya Gini Gani
- Romaya Gini Gani 2
- Suba Sandewak
- Sudu Redi Horu
- Thalamala Pipila

== Filmography ==
His maiden cinematic experience came through a minor role in 1990 film Hima Gira, directed by Vijaya Dharma Sri. Since then, he had acted in about 12 films, mostly in supportive characters.

Year	Film	Role	Ref.
1990	Hima Gira		
1994	Ahas Maliga		
1996	Seema Pawuru		
1996	Maduree		
1998	Gini Avi Saha Gini Keli	Campaign support seeker	
2000	Saroja	Police Chief	
2008	Siri Raja Siri	Shehan's father	
2013	Bomba Saha Rosa		
2013	Siri Parakum	Sangharaja Thero	
2016	Paththini	Athura's father	
2019	President Super Star	Janadhipathi	
TBD	Eka Gei Sokari		
TBD	Thanapathilage Gedara		
TBD	Nim Him		
TBD	Kadira Divyaraja		
