= Dharshan Thavaraja =

Sri Lankan actor

Dharshan Thavaraja දර්ශන් තවරාජා
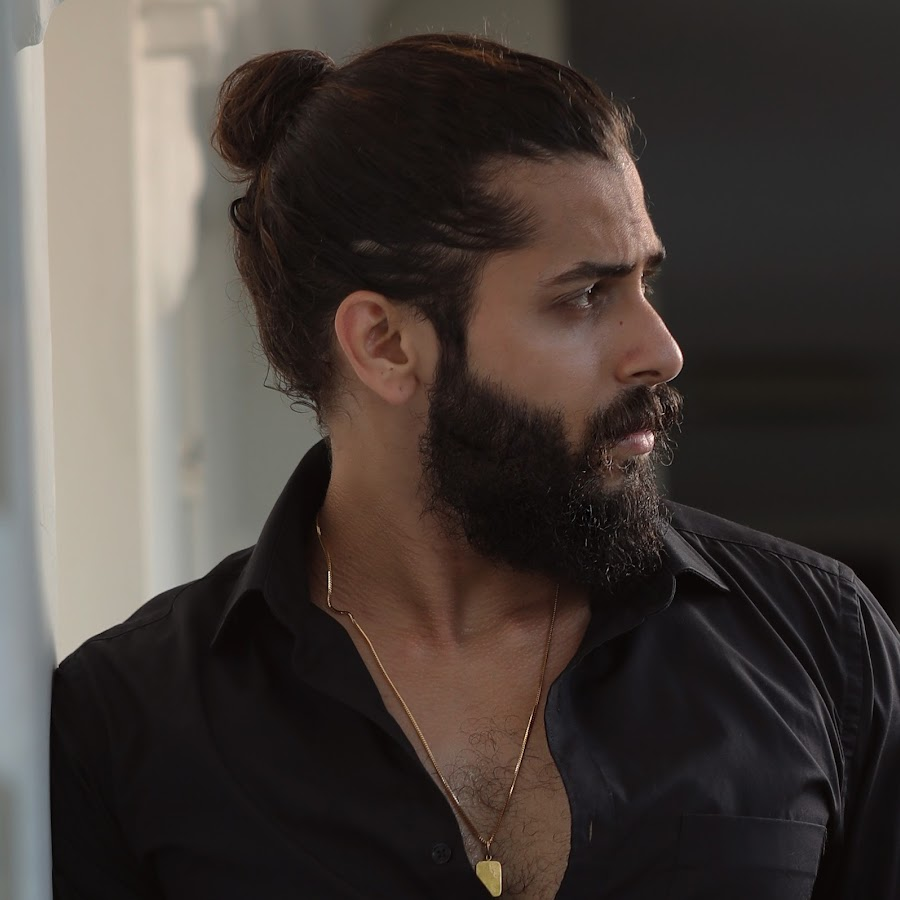
- Born: Dharshan Thavaraja; 7 January 1994 (age 32); Colombo, Sri Lanka
- Education: Vivekananda College, Colombo
- Occupation: Actor
- Years active: 2021–present

Dharshan Thavaraja (born on 7 January 1994) is a portrait artist and an actor in Sri Lankan Television. Dharshan started his career as a TV Presenter and a model. He started his journey from the Tamil entertainment industry in Sri Lanka and later started acting in Sinhala Teledramas.

== Personal life ==
Dharshan Thavaraja was born on 7 January 1994. He has an elder sister. His mother's name is Shanmugam Chithrakala. He studied in Vivekananda College, Colombo. Later he joined an art school in India to master Painting

When he was a kid, he used to imitate his relatives and family friends' behaviors, in front of his family members. From the beginning his family always motivates him to continue what he is passionate about. Dharshan as a teenager, always wanted to dress nice and smart even when he did not have enough money, once he mentioned that his grandmother always supported fulfilling his great desires.

== Acting career ==
Dharshan started his career in Tamil Entertainment industry while he was working as a Television presenter and moved to Sinhala Television industry in 2021. As per him he has not received enough appreciations and encouragement from his Tamil audience. Therefore, he had to decide whether he should move to Sinhala Television industry which is the major entertainment stream in Sri Lanka or to seek for opportunities in Indian Film Industry. Dharshan prefers Villain or Action hero roles in his career.

Dharshan is acting in Hithuwakkara and Sidu 2 – Shakthi Sinahala Tele Series. He acted in Adhiraa , Rudhrashakra and 7K Tamil Tele Series.

=== Teledramas/Series ===
Name	Director	Year
Adhira 7K	SutharshanKanagarajah Thinesh Kanagaraj	2020
Rudhrashakraa	Sutharshan Kanagarajah	2021
Hithuwakkara	Thilina Boralessa	2021
Sidu Season 2 Tele Series	Thilina Boralessa	2022
See You	Danushka Rathnayaka	2024
Ron Soya		2025
Sonu Mandara		2026

=== Movies ===
Name	Director	Year
Back to Elephant Walk	Nihal Bandara	2021
Mayam Kirilli (TeleFilm)	Hemantha Prasad	2022
Pottu Pichcha Mal	Angela Kuruppu	2022
Man Hoyanne Premayak	Thilina Boralassa	2026
Premiye		TBA

== Beyond Acting ==
Dharshan started painting as a business after completing his Secondary education. He was planning to join Cabin crew after completing his Advanced Level as he is eager to Travel. Meanwhile he was offered with a job as a Television presenter. He continued his career as a TV presenter and a Production assistant in Shakthi TV for 8 years and left the organization in 2021 to start his career as a professional actor.

Dharshan started as a Model (person) with a brand called FOA. Lately he worked with Emerald, Deedat, Fashion bug.

Dharshan released his first Song Deepavali Ra with Torana Music in October 2022.
