= Chamara Janaraj Peiris =

Sri Lankan director

Chamara Janaraj Peiris චාමර ජනරාජ් පීරිස්
- Born: Chamara Janaraj Peiris; 14 January 1970 (age 56); Colombo, Sri Lanka
- Education: Royal College, Colombo
- Occupations: Director, screen writer
- Years active: 1991–present

Chamara Janaraj Peiris (චාමර ජනරාජ් පීරිස්; born 14 January 1970), is a Sri Lankan Journalist, Screenplay Writer, Teledrama Director and Filmmaker. He has produced several critically acclaimed television serials such as Piyavi, Ayal, Batahira Ahasa and Raahu. Currently he is the Creative Director of Pix and Words (Pvt) Ltd.

== Personal life ==
Peiris was born on 14 January 1970 in Colombo as the only child of the family. He completed education from Royal College, Colombo. In his last year at the school, he was awarded the best student by the President. His father died on 17 March 2011.

== Career ==
After completing education, he went Russia with a scholarship to obtain Bachelor of Science in Architecture from Moscow Architecture Academy in 1997. Then he completed MSc in Landscape Design from University of Moratuwa in 2003. He worked as SLBC correspondent in Moscow for six years from 1991 to 1997. When he was working as a journalist, he wrote a script for a teledrama and went to a well known director in Sri Lanka, but he refused.

In 2009, Peries directed his maiden television serial Ayal. Then he directed his next serial Piyavi in 2011 and Yaya 4 in 2012. All three serials were critically acclaimed and had 30 nominations in many local festivals. Since then, Peiris has contributed with many popular serials including Acid, VVIP, Batahira Ahasa and Raahu.

Apart from television serials, Peiris involved in many advertisements, documentary programs as well as a journalist in Associate Newspapers Ceylon Ltd. (ANCL) since 1997 to 2010. He wrote series of articles called 13th Page and articles on Extraterrestrial beings and the Theory of Universe published in Dinamina Newspaper. Then he worked as Director Programming for Stein Studios from 2016 to 2017. While working in ANCL, Peiris contributed in many positions such as administrative officer, managing editor, layout editor and graphic designer.

In 2019, he made his debut cinema direction with the film Uthuru Sulanga. The film was released on 29 April 2021.

== Awards ==
Peiris has won and nominated for several awards at teledrama festivals for Best director and best script.

=== State Film Awards ===
Year	Nominee / work	Award	Result
2011	Ayal	Best Teledrama Director	Won
2011	Ayal	Best Teledrama Scriptwriter	Won
2012	Piyavi	Best Teledrama Director	Nominated
2012	Piyavi	Best Teledrama Scriptwriter	Nominated
2013	Yaya 4	Best Teledrama Scriptwriter	Nominated

=== Raigam Tele'es ===
Year	Nominee / work	Award	Result
2010	Ayal	Jury Special Award	Won
2010	Ayal	Best Teledrama Scriptwriter	Nominated
2011	Piyavi	Best Teledrama Scriptwriter	Nominated
2012	Piyavi	Best Teledrama Director	Nominated

=== Sumathi Awards ===
Year	Nominee / work	Award	Result
2010	Piyavi	Jury Special Award	Won

== Directed serials ==
Year	Tele serial	Ref.
2009	Ayal	
2011	Piyavi	
2012	Yaya 4	
2014	Acid	
2014	Red Rain	
2015	VVIP	
2015	Pulse	
2015	A330	
2016	Andromeda	
2016	Batahira Ahasa	
2017	Thrimana	
2019	Raahu	
2022	Veeduru Mal	

== Directed films ==
Year	Film	Ref.
2021	Uthuru Sulanga	
