= Visal Adare =

- Sinhala: විසල් ආදරේ
- Directed by: Wasawa Baduge
- Written by: Dilshi Thathsarani
- Produced by: Hasitha Jayasinghe, Densil Tissera, Roshan Anthonies, Himashel Alwis, Wasawa Baduge
- Starring: Dinakshie Priyasad; Sachin Liyanage; Rashiprabha Sandeepani; Nimesh Weeranga
- Cinematography: Wasawa Baduge
- Edited by: Wasawa Baduge; Saranga Perera
- Music by: Yasas Medagedara
- Production company: Cinematic Sensations Pvt Ltd
- Distributed by: MPI Theatres
- Release date: 3 May 2024
- Running time: 120 minutes
- Country: Sri Lanka
- Language: Sinhala
- Budget: 4 crore LKR
- Box office: 15 crore LKR (world-wide)

Visal Adare (Sinhala: විසල් ආදරේ), is a 2024 Sri Lankan Sinhalese musical romantic drama film directed by Wasawa Baduge and Produced by Hasitha Jayasinghe, Densil Tissera, Roshan Anthonies, Himashel Alwis, Wasawa Baduge. The film features Dinakshie Priyasad in the lead role, with popular teledrama actor Sachin Liyanage making his debut in cinema. Rashiprabha Sandeepani, Nimesh Weeranga has played supportive roles.

== Cast ==
- Dinakshie Priyasad as Saara
- Sachin Liyanage
- Rashiprabha Sandeepani as Thaadi
- Nimesh Weeranga

== Production and release ==
This is the second film directed by Wasawa Baduge after 2022 blockbuster Adaraneeya Prarthana. Apart from direction, he is also the producer, cinematographer and co-editor with Sandaruwan Perera. Dilshi Thathsarani is the writer and Yasas Medagedara is the music director, whereas Shehan Galahitiyawa and Sajith Akmeemana are the lyricists. Production was designed by Yashi Silva and Harsha Madhawa served as the makeup artist. Niroshan Welagedara served as the production manager, while Dhanushka Perera worked the assistant director. Camera and electrical department was handled by Rasitha Kavinda. Asanka Munasinghe joined as the first assistant cameraman, and Viraj Fernando was responsible for still photography.

The film was initially planned for screening in November 2023 but was later delayed. Finally, the film was released on 3 May 2024 in MPI Theatres island-wide. The film was also released outside of Sri Lanka. The trailer of the film was released in February 2024. Mega Live Events distributed the film across Australia and New Zealand, while Ceylon Entertainment Canada released the film in Canada and the USA. The film song Nube Aes was released on 8 November 2023. Then in April 2024, the film song Desin Desin was released.
