= Geetha Kanthi Jayakody =

Sri Lankan actress

- ගීතා කාන්ති ජයකොඩි
- Born: November 28, 1957 (age 68); Colombo
- Occupations: Actress, Dubbing artist
- Years active: 1980–present
- Children: Paboda Sandeepani
- Relatives: Rathna Lalani Jayakody (sister); Sampath Tennakoon (brother-in-law); Bimal Jayakody (brother's son); Sujani Menaka (Bimal's wife); Yash Weerasinghe (sister's son)

Jayakodige Dona Geetha Kanthi (born November 28, 1957, as (Sinhala: ගීතා කාන්ති ජයකොඩි)), popularly known as Geetha Kanthi Jayakody, is an actress in Sri Lankan cinema. theater and television. She is also a dubbing artist.

== Personal life ==
Geetha Kanthi Jayakody was born on 28 November 1957 as the second of the family. Her father was an Ayurvedic doctor. She completed education from Siddhartha Maha Vidyalaya, Wellampitiya. She has one older brother, one younger brother, Piyal and two younger sisters - Sriyani and Rathna Lalani. Rathna Lalani Jayakody is also a renowned award-winning actress in Sri Lankan cinema, theater and television. Rathna Lalani is married to fellow actor Sampath Tennakoon. Popular actor Bimal Jayakody is the son of Geetha's older brother. Bimal is married to fellow actress Sujani Menaka. Geetha's sister, Sriyani Muditha has one son, Yash Weerasinghe. Yash is a popular actor in television.

Jayakody has one daughter - Paboda Sanedepani. She is also a popular award-winning actress. When Paboda was just five years old, they both acted in the teledrama Yashorawaya. Then they acted together in teledrama Bopath Sakkiya. After 31 years, they acted together in the upcoming film Sri Saddha.

== Career ==
Before starting acting career, Jayakody joined with Sri Lanka Broadcasting Corporation for Lama Pitiya program. At about 21 years, she performed Ambika Geethayen Geethaya program as a radio relief announcer. While at the Lamapitiya, she played as Catherine Kumari in Bandula Withanage's drama Lanka Kathawa. Her first acting came through stage drama Kelani Palama as a school girl Surangani. During its second production of Kolam drama Sakkhaya Dhitti by Lucien Bulathsinhala, Gamini Samarakoon starred as 'Gamaya' and Geetha Kanthi Jayakody as 'Gama Hamine'. The role 'Daisy' in the stage play Rhinoceros (1986), directed by veteran writer Kapila Kumara Kalinga, is one of the highlights of Geetha Kanthi's drama.

Later, she joined the play Veniciye Welenda for a brief period. At the age about 18 years, she played the role village girl in television play Hath Pana. Her maiden television direction came through Ashirwada which was telecasted on Esala Poya Day through TV Derana in 2012.

=== Selected television serials ===
- Adarawanthayo
- Ahasin Watuna Gahaniyak
- Bath Amma
- Bopath Sakkiya
- Dawena Maw
- Doratu Rakinno
- Gal Pilimaya Saha Bol Pilimaya
- Hansa Pihatu
- Hima Giri Arana
- Hima Piyali
- Indrachapa
- Ira Handa Payana Lokaya
- Kemmura
- Kiriammawaru
- Laabai Apple
- Mathaka Sulanga
- Mayavi
- Mayura Asapuwa
- Meda Gedara
- Miringuwen Eha
- Nenala
- Nil Nethu
- Pem Piyawara
- Passe Gena Manamali
- Pingala Danawwa
- Podi Mama
- Ran Doratuwa
- Raja Bhavana
- Sakwa Lihiniyo
- Sausiri Uyana
- Sepalika
- Sinasenna Mata
- Siri Sirimal
- Sneha
- Thunpath Ratawaka Lassana
- Visula Ahasa Yata
- Yashorawaya

=== Selected stage dramas ===
- Kelani Palama
- Ahasin Watunu Minissu
- Mala Walalu
- Rhinoceros
- Sakkhaya Dhitti

== Filmography ==
Her maiden cinematic experience came through a main role in 1982 film Ridee Nimnaya, directed by D.B. Nihalsinghe, which earned nominations for the Best actress in that year. Some of her popular films are Ridee Nimnaya, Parawarthana and Gamani.

Key
†	Denotes films that have not yet been released

Year	Film	Role	Ref.
1982	Ridee Nimnaya	Nandawathie	
1986	Pooja	Vasanthi	
1989	Okkoma Rajawaru		
1990	Hondin Naththam Narakin		
1990	Pem Rajadahana	Savithri	
1990	Chandi Raja		
1993	Sandarekha		
1997	Ninja Sri Lanka		
1998	Dorakada Marawa	Subha's sister	
2000	Sanda Yahanata		
2003	Sudu Kaluwara	Lami	
2008	Adara Meena		
2011	Gamani	Sudha's mother	
2014	Parawarthana	Vimalawathi	
2015	Maharaja Ajasath	Punna	
2015	Ho Gaana Pokuna	Justin's wife	
2016	Hath Pana	Mother (Home movie)	
2019	Sama Kumaru Kathawa		
2024	Sri Siddha	Sugula's mother	
TBA	Adarei Jaanu †		
TBA	Cyanide †		

== Awards and accolades ==
She has won several awards at the local stage drama festivals and television festivals.

=== Sumathi Awards ===
Year	Nominee / work	Award	Result
2001	Kemmura	Best Supporting Actress	Won
