= Rathna Lalani Jayakody =

Sri Lankan actress and teacher (born 1964)

- රත්නා ලාලනී ජයකොඩි
- Born: 8 January 1964 (age 62); Colombo
- Education: Siddhartha Maha Vidyalaya, Sedawatta; Kolonnawa Balika Vidyalaya
- Occupations: Actress, teacher
- Years active: 1986–present
- Spouse: Sampath Tennakoon
- Children: Manjitha Thennakoon (son)
- Relatives: Geetha Kanthi Jayakody (sister); Paboda Sandeepani (sister's daughter); Bimal Jayakody (brother's son); Sujani Menaka (Bimal's wife)

Jayakodige Dona Rathna Lalani (born 8 January 1964 as රත්නා ලාලනී ජයකොඩි [Sinhala]), popularly known as Rathna Lalani Jayakody, is an actress in Sri Lankan cinema, theatre and television. She is a teacher by profession.

== Personal life ==
Rathna Lalani Jayakody was born on 8 January 1964 as the youngest of the family. Her father is an Ayurvedic doctor. She went to Siddhartha Maha Vidyalaya, Sedawatta and then attended to Kolonnawa Balika Vidyalaya. She has two elder brothers, two elder sisters – Geetha Kanthi and Sriyani. Geetha Kanthi is also a renowned award-winning actress in Sri Lankan cinema, theatre and television. Popular actor Bimal Jayakody is the son of Rathna's elder brother. Bimal is married to fellow actress Sujani Menaka. Popular actress Paboda Sandeepani is the daughter of her sister Geetha Kanthi.

Rathna Lalani was married to fellow actor Sampath Tennakoon. They first met during a stage drama Puthra Samagama and then in Suba Sandewak. They have acted more than 50 stage dramas together.

She is currently working as a teacher in Sri Rajasinghe Madya Maha Vidyalaya.

== Acting career ==
Before starting acting career, Jayakody joined with Sri Lanka Broadcasting Corporation for Lama Pitiya program with her sister Geetha Kanthi. Accordingly, she joined many children's radio programs like, Sangeeta Sandhyawa, Gurukulaya, Kanitu Sarasaviya and Lamaa Ranga Peetaya. Later, she got to play the role in the stage play Veniciye Velenda previously played by her sister.

In 1985, she acted in the stage play Julius Caesar produced by Tony Ranasinghe with the role "Poesia" where she became the one and only Gamini Fonseka's only girlfriend on stage. She was selected for many dramas due to her voice best suited for Noorthi and stage drama songs. She acted under the prominent directors such as Ananda Sirisena, Agnes Sirisena, Mahinda Algama, Ashoka Tillakaratne and Piyadasa Ranasinghe to polish her abilities. Since then she involved in almost every drama produced by Dr. Jayalath Manoratne as well as performed in several plays of Bandula Withanage, Douglas Siriwardane and K. B. Herath such as Suba Sændǣwak and Hitler. She played as the "Maname princess" as the seventh actress to play the role in the drama Maname by Ediriweera Sarachchandra and then in his play Pematho Jayathi Soko.

In 1982, she won the award for the Best Stage Actress for the role in the play Paarajika by Sunanda Silva at the Youth Theater Festival and then won the Best Stage Actress in 1983 for Thunmansala by Somapala Pathirage. Then she won the best actress award at the State Drama Festival in 1996, for the role in Romaya Gini Gani produced by Bandula Vithanage. Her maiden television acting came through Parakrama Niriella's Laa Hiru Dahasak. Her role as Ranjani in the teledrama Yashorawaya was critically acclaimed. After seeing the role, filmmaker Lester James Peries asked her to act in his 1991 film Awaragira.

She also acted in Verona, and Hathara Wate

In 1991, a drama festival named Ratna Lalani Drama Festival was held. In 2013, Rathna and Sampath organised a drama festival titled Abhinayana Sampath-Rathna Rangabhumika to celebrate their 30 years in stage drama career. They staged seven popular dramas from 17 to 23 December 2013 at New Town Hall, Colombo 7, which they together acted.

=== Selected stage dramas ===
- Vaneesiye Welenda
- Thunmansala
- Suba Sandewak
- Maname
- Mayadevi
- Puthra Samagama
- Guru Tharuwa
- Jagan Ma
- Romaya Gini Gani
- Thalamala Pipila
- Andarela
- Deseeya Thunseeya
- Mala Walalu

== Filmography ==
Her maiden cinematic experience came through a minor role in 1986 film Pooja, directed by Dharmasiri Gamage. Some of her popular films are Awaragira, Randiya Dahara and Pooja.

Key
†	Denotes films that have not yet been released

Year	Film	Role	Ref.
1986	Pooja		
1989	Siri Medura	Kamala	
1992	Malsara Doni		
1995	Awaragira	Seetha	
2002	Punchi Suranganavi	Abandoned Nurse	
2003	Sudu Kaluwara	Margaret Fernando	
2004	Randiya Dahara	Lionel's wife	
2008	Siri Raja Siri	Class teacher	
2011	Gamani	Murder victim	
2016	Sarigama	Sister Rita	
2019	President Super Star	Samanthika	
2024	Sinhabahu		
2024	Gini Avi Saha Gini Keli 2		
TBA	Thanapathilage Gedara †		
TBA	Diriya Doni †		
