= Bimal Jayakody =

Sri Lankan actor and singer

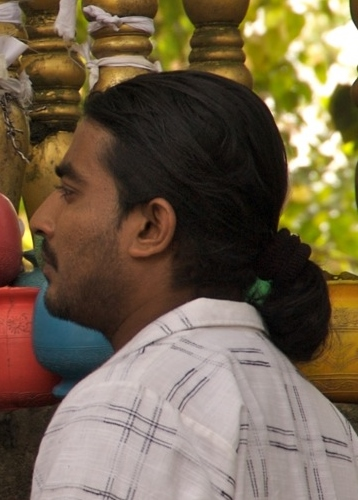
- Jayakody in 2006
- Born: Jayakodige Dona Dhanuka Bimal Jayakody; June 21, 1977 (age 49)
- Occupations: Actor, singer
- Years active: 2000–present
- Spouse: Sujani Menaka (m. 2007)
- Relatives: Geetha Kanthi Jayakody (aunt); Rathna Lalani Jayakody (aunt); Sampath Tennakoon (uncle); Paboda Sandeepani (cousin)

Jayakodige Dona Dhanuka Bimal Jayakody (born on 21 June 1977: as බිමල් ජයකොඩි), popularly known as Bimal Jayakody is an actor in Sri Lankan cinema and television. The highly versatile actor, Jayakody is known for many dramatic roles and award nominations at film festivals.

== Personal life ==
Jayakodi was born as the eldest of the family, where his father is a regional politician and also an actor. His brother is a musician. He met his wife Sujani Menaka, who is also a Sri Lankan teledrama and film actress during the teledrama Ramya Suramya back in 2000. They married in 2007 after seven years of affair.

His father's two sisters - Geetha Kanthi Jayakody and Rathna Lalani Jayakody are also renowned award-winning actresses in Sri Lankan cinema, theater and television. Popular actress Paboda Sandeepani is the daughter of Geetha Kanthi. Rathna Lalani is married to fellow actor Sampath Tennakoon.

== Career ==
Jayakody started drama as a television technician. After that, after working for about 6 years, he got the opportunity to join a television serial Hada Vila Sakmana directed by Prasanna Jayakody. After that, he continued to work as a technician and actor. He also worked as a producer in a media company. Jayakody is mainly a television actor, who contributed a diverse array of television serials of many genres. Apart from television, he also acted in a few stage plays such as Apahu Enna Ba.

Jayakody started his film career with Ali Patiyo Oyay Mamai back in 2006, though a minor role. After that, he played many leading and critically acclaimed roles on many occasions in cinema, such as in Sankranthi, Gamani, Aba, Siri Parakum and Sakkarang. He was nominated on several occasions for Gamani and Sakkarang and gain critical acclaim. In 2008, he acted in Sri Lanka's first Digital movie named Hetawath Mata Adaraya Karanna.

He won the award for the Best Actor at the 2012 Raigam Tele'es for his role in Senakeliyay Maya. He is also nominated for Best Supporting Actor in several awards at the local stage drama festivals and television festivals.

=== Selected television serials ===
- 1990
- Amaa
- Agni piyapath
- Anavaratha
- Angana
- Athuru Mithuru
- Bharyawo
- Bhava Arana
- Bio
- Daam as Walter De Almeda
- Degammadiyawa as Wimale
- Devana Warama
- Deweni Inima as Ravi Fernando
- Ehipillamak Yata as Megha
- Hada Vila Sakmana
- Husma Saha Oxygen
- Ithirena Kiri
- Ihirunu Kiri
- Jeewithaya Dakinna
- Jeewithayata Idadenna
- Jeewithaye Eka Dawasak
- Kadathira
- Maya Ranaga
- Mihidum Sevaneli
- Mihidum Sihina
- Olu 2
- Pabalu
- Pani Makuluwo
- Pipi Piyum
- Raahu
- Rala as Priyankara
- Ralla Veralata Adarei as Weerawarna Kulasuriya
- Ramya Suramya
- Rasthiyadukaraya
- Rasa Rahasak as Narada
- Sadhisi Tharanaya,
- Sagare Se Man Adarei
- Samanala Wasanthaya
- Samanalunta Wedithiyanna
- Sanakeliyai Maya
- See Raja
- Sihina Aran Enna
- Sithin Siyawara
- Snap as IG
- Sulanga Maha Meraka
- Take Care
- Thamba Pata Handewa
- Veeduru Mal
- Vishnu Sankranthiya
- Vishwanthari
- Wara Mal
- Wasana Wewa
- Red Lights
- Kiss Season 1 & 2
- Pirinivan Kandu Pamula

== Singing career ==
Jayakodi released his first song Oba Aye Dawasaka in 2014.

== Filmography ==
Key
†	Denotes films that have not yet been released

Year	Film	Role	Notes	Ref.
2006	Ali Patio Oyai Mamai	Viraj		
2007	Sankranthi	Sunimal		
2008	Aba	Chittaraja		
2008	Puthuni Hambagiya	Ashen		
2009	Paya Enna Hiru Se	Suren's friend		
2010	Sthuthi Nawatha Enna	Keerthiratne		
2010	Bambara Walalla	Sunil		
2010	Ira Handa Yata	Pole Master		
2011	Gamani	Major Vikum		
2013	Bomba Saha Rosa	Mahil		
2013	Siri Parakum	Gamarala		
2013	Nikini Vassa			
2014	Parawarthana	Police OIC		
2015	Address Na	Police Inspector		
2016	Sakkarang	Sube		
2016	Adaraneeya Kathawak	Uvindu		
2017	Dedunu Akase	Ramesh		
2018	Tawume Iskole	Surendra		
2019	Dekala Purudu Kenek	Sachithra		
2019	President Super Star	Lawyer		
2019	U Turn	Maya's husband		
2020	Tsunami	Kapila		
2021	Uthuru Sulanga			
2021	Kawuruth Danne Na	Inspector Wikrama Lokubandara		
2022	Ashawari	Lasantha		
2022	Night Rider			
2022	CineMa	Vishwa Keerthi Amarasuriya		
2023	Kandak Sema	Sumal		
2024	1970 Love Story	Clifford Dunuwila		
2024	Mandara	Bharatha		
2025	Rani	Mahinda Rajapaksa		
2025	Ice Cream	Mario		
2025	Mother Lanka			
2026	Father	Dhammika Prasanna Chandrasena		
2026	Dharmayuddhaya 2	Harischandra		
TBA	House of My Fathers †	Asoka		
TBA	Sewanali †			
TBA	Kondadeniye Hamuduruwo †			
TBA	Thanapathilage Gedara †			
TBA	Pashchima Yamaya †			
TBA	Rapist †			
TBA	Room No 106 †			
TBA	Pirinivan Kandu Pamula †			

== Awards and accolades ==
=== Raigam Tele'es Awards ===
Year	Nominee / work	Award	Result
2012	Senakeliyay Maya	Best Actor	Won
2024	Jivithaye Ek dawasak	Best Actor	Nominated

=== Sarasaviya Awards ===
Year	Nominee / work	Award	Result
2019	Dekala Purudu Kenek	Best Actor	Won

=== Presidential Film Awards ===
Year	Nominee / work	Award	Result
2019	Dekala Purudu Kenek	Best Actor	Nominated

=== Derana Film Awards ===
Year	Nominee / work	Award	Result
2023	Popular Award	Popular Actor in a Negative Role	Won
