= Gindari 2 =

Gindari 2 ගින්දරී 2
- Directed by: Udayakantha Warnasuriya
- Written by: Udayakantha Warnasuriya
- Produced by: Udayakantha Warnasuriya
- Starring: Paboda Sandeepani; Mahendra Perera; Rodney Warnakula; Srinath Maddumage
- Cinematography: K.D Dayananda
- Edited by: Pravin Jayaratne
- Music by: Ananda Perera
- Release date: 1 December 2022
- Language: Sinhala

Gindari 2: Bahubuthayo 3 (Sinhala: ගින්දරී 2 - බහුබූතයෝ 3) is a 2022 Sinhalese comedy mystery film written and directed and produced by Udayakantha Warnasuriya. The film served as a sequel to the 2015 film Gindari, which is the third installment of Bahubuthayo film series. Rodney Warnakula, Mahendra Perera and Paboda Sandeepani in reprise their lead roles along with Saman Hemaratne and Srinath Maddumage. Music composed by Ananda Perera.

== Production ==
The filming starts in January 2019. The film was shot in and around Colombo, Sri Lanka over the course of 45 days.

== Cast ==
- Paboda Sandeepani as Tikiri
- Mahendra Perera as Lanti
- Rodney Warnakula as Bunty
- Tishen Wanhof as Supiri
- Richerd Manamudali as Chaminda
- Srinath Maddumage as God
- Saman Hemaratne as S Dantha, god's apprentice
- Chulakshi Ranathunga as Devil princess
- Sarath Chandrasiri
- Teena Shanel as Devil
- Tharindi Fernando as Devil
- Ananda Atukorale as Thug
- Chanchala Warnasuriya as Devil
- Nilmini Kottegoda as God's wife
- Sarath Kothalawala
- Chathura Perera
- Wasantha Wittachchi

== International screening ==
The film was screened at "The Scope Film Festival" from the 4th to the 8th of September 2020 at the Liberty Cinema Hall, Colombo. On 20 December 2020, the film's first international premiere will take place at Mill Park and Narre Warren in Melbourne, Australia.

The movie was screened on the 13 February 2021 at 4.30 pm at the Cinema Village Hobbit in Tasmania.
