= Mihira Sirithilaka =

Sri Lankan actor (born 1978)

- මිහිර සිරිතිලක
- Born: Mihira Sirithilaka; 28 May 1978 (age 48); Agunakolapalessa, Hambantota, Sri Lanka
- Occupations: Actor, writer, director Screen Play Writer, Author
- Years active: 2013 - present
- Spouse: Geethika Madurangi (m. 2008)
- Awards: Best Supporting Actor

Mihira Sirithilaka (born May 28, 1978, as මිහිර සිරිතිලක [Sinhala]) is an actor in Sri Lankan cinema, theater and television. Primarily active as a comedian in Sinhala television, Sirithilaka is well known for his roles in the television serials Monarathenna, Ataka Nataka, Ingi Bingi and Sihina Genena Kumariye.

== Early days ==
He was born on 28 May 1978 in the village Eraminiyaya in Agunakolapalessa, Hambantota as the second child to a middle-class family. His father worked for the River Valley Development Board. He has one elder and one younger brother. He studied up to Ordinary Level at Wewa Central College. Then he attended Weeraketiya Rajapaksa College for Advanced Level Biology. During school, he is an active member in speech competitions and essay competitions. When he was doing Advanced Level, his father died and his mother took sole responsibility for raising the family. When his father died, his elder brother dropped out of school and went to work. Mihira could not get enough marks to go to university for the first time as he did not have the money to go to private classes.

Sirithilaka first developed an interest in acting in late 1998, after participating in the Sudharshani Drama Course conducted by Mangala Senanayake. He married his longtime partner, Geethika Madurangi, in 2008.

== Career ==
After leaving school, he started drawing arts to make money. He meet an artist named Lester Ruhunuhewa where they together painted on the walls of hotels as well as T-shirt painting. Prominent dramatist Gamini Haththotuwegama comes to Eraminiyaya to do a street play while Mihira got the opportunity to participate in it. During this time in 1998, he attended a five-day workshop at the National Youth Services Council to learn stage drama. After the five day workshop, he wrote and directed a stage play Sethkama and also formed a stage drama team. When the show was scheduled and tickets were sold, one person shouted, "You have not paid the entertainment tax," and took him to that government agency. After taking a circular from Ranasinghe Premadasa, he was released to perform dramas again.

In 1999, Sirithilaka came to Colombo for a drama course at Sudarshi conducted by Mangala Senanayake. Then he acted in Senanayake's stage plays Magul Kema and Ketima Keti. Sirithilaka has regularly featured in many stage dramas since beginning his career as an actor. Some of his popular stage dramas include Nari Burathi, Balloth Ekka Ba, Deyyoth Danne Nehe and Bala Samagama.

Sirithilaka moved to Colombo in 2000 and got a chance to act in D.G. Somapala's teledrama Dedunu Palama. This was his maiden appearance in popular drama culture. Though it was a minor role, he was lucky to gain attention from that drama. In 2002 he acted in the play Sihala Wansala produced by Douglas Siriwardena. His first main role came through Sudath Rohana's teledrama Eka Iththaka Mal with the role Preethipala. During this period, he also was involved in the television serials: Dedunu Palama and Raja Kaduwa which gained him popularity. Later he made the character of 'Andiris Nilame' in Saman Kumara Liyanage's teledrama Monaratenna. After that tired character, he received a special merit award from the jury at Raigam Tele'es.

Sirithilaka has also appeared as a co-star on many television shows. Starring alongside Kumara Thirimadura, he hosted the program Maarai Hirai, and also hosted a cookery program called Rasa Piri Tharu Recipi. Both programs were broadcast on TV Derana. He also hosted a musical game program Wayannai Gayannai accompanied by Rajitha Hiran, broadcast by Sirasa TV. Sirithilaka also hosts the television program Rasoghaya on Siyatha TV with Thirimadura. He hosts the program 4 Kendare with Priyantha Seneviratne telecasts on Hiru TV. He hosted the reality program Sirasa Super Mom. Currently, he hosts musical program Dialog Ridma Rathriya telecast on TNL TV.

His first short play was Bota Hondanam Mata Moko. The play won the Audience Award and Best Production Award at the Wedikawen Mahapolowata Awards ceremony. At the same festival, he won the Best Stage Administrator award for another play. He won the Best Actor award in the Alternative category at the 2003 State Drama Festival. In the same year, his children's play Ayanu Aayanu won the awards for Best Production, Best Director and Best Screenplay. Then he won the award for the Best Supporting Actor at the State Drama Festival and Youth Awards for the stage play Thaniyek Vishishtai.

Sirithilaka began his film career in 2003 with Udayakantha Warnasuriya's commercial film Le Kiri Kandulu. Then he appeared as servant Sarath in Warnasuriya's film Hiri Poda Wassa in 2005. After that, the majority of his roles have been comedy parts, often as a co-star or in a minor role. He had a major role in the sports film Sinhawalokanaya as the character Hawadiya.

He has also appeared in music videos, such as Amma Amma by Rukshan Mark, and Heena Kade by Ajantha Peiris.

His first attempt at directing and writing came with the drama Ko Kukko. The play premiered on 8 August 2014 at Tower Hall, Maradana. In 2019, he acted in the serial Sakala Guru which became very popular with his role as "Bhoothaya". In 2020, Mihira along with Chinthaka Pieris co-directed the comedy teleserial Ingi Bingi. In the same year, he acted in the musical television serial Sihina Genena Kumariye and played the role "Rosa". In the serial, he also sang the song 'Sathsarani'.

In 2021, he joined with comedy program Three Sisters along with Bandu Samarasinghe and Mahinda Pathirage. In the program, the trio act as three young unmarried sisters.

=== Selected television serials ===
- Ahas Maliga
- Alupata Heena
- And Company
- Anguru Siththam
- Ayemath Adaren
- Bhavaharana
- Boradiya Kandura
- Chuttey
- Dedunu Palama
- Dekada Kada
- Dese Disnaya
- Diyathaka Senehasa
- Eka Iththaka Mal
- Encounter 1, 2
- Ganga Langa Gedara
- Gini Avi Saha Gini Keli
- Heart Cart
- Heily
- Hulan Gedara
- Ingi Bingi
- Malak
- Mayagira
- Medi Sina,
- Modara Walla
- Maama Haa Ma
- Monarathenna
- Muthu Palasa
- On Ataka Nataka
- Onna Ohe Menna Mehe
- Pabalu
- Pini Wessak
- Raja Kaduwa
- Ran Samanalayo
- Ron Soya
- Sabada Eliyas
- Sabba Sakala Manaa
- Sagare Se Adare
- Sagare Se Man Adarei
- Saheli
- Sakala Guru
- Sakala Guru 2
- Senehasata Adaren
- Sihina Genena Kumariye
- Sihina Sithuvam
- Sonduru Gimhanaya
- Thurumpu Asiya
- Wada Bari Daasa
- Wahi Lihini

=== Television prank ===
In 2013, individuals associated with Mega Bite, a program broadcast by Hiru TV, abducted Sirithilaka and threatened him with death as part of a prank on the show. He was forced to kneel in the street and telephone his wife to ask for a ransom. On the same day, he filed a case against the program over the incident. The suspects were sent to prison by the court until 10 September, and the TV channel took responsibility and apologised to Sirithilaka and his family.

== Authored works ==
In May 2017 at the Maharagama Youth Center, Sirithilaka launched two books: a novel titled Dehi Dodam Premaya and a collection of poetry titled Oba Nisa.

== Awards ==
- Raigam Tele'es Jury Award in 2013 - for the role Andiris Nilame of Monarathenna

== Filmography ==
Key
†	Denotes films that have not yet been released

Year	Film	Role	Ref.
2003	Le Kiri Kandulu	Minor role.	
2005	Hiripoda Wassa	Sarath	
2007	Sikuru Hathe	Necklace thief	
2011	Sinhawalokanaya	Hawadiya	
2012	Wassane Senehasa	Gunapala	
2012	Super Six	uncredited role	
2014	Ko Mark No Mark	Lekamthuma. also as screenplay writer	
2015	None Mage Sudu None	Manju	
2015	Suhada Koka	Clerk. also as playback singer, script writer	
2016	Sinhaya	Mudalali	
2016	Ulath Ekai Pilath Ekai	Sergent Premachandra	
2016	Maya 3D	Ramu's son	
2016	Sujatha Puthra	Dayasena	
2016	Ran Dedunnak	Bala	
2019	President Super Star	multiple roles	
2020	The Newspaper	Security officer	
2023	Kathuru Mithuru	Curly haired man	
2023	Abhisheka	Sumith	
2023	Nattami Army	Sarā	
2024	Sihinayaki Adare		
2024	Weerya		
2025	Housefull	Chaminda	
2025	Elada Braa		
2025	Mr. Missis		
2026	Abheetha		
TBA	Athuwath Be Nethuwath Be †		
TBA	Surangana Lowin Awilla †		
TBA	Amuthu Gurukamak †		
TBA	Amuthu 3k †		
TBA	Mala Magulai †		
TBA	Sargent Punchisoma †	Constable Banda	
