= Sumanapala =

Sumanapala is both a given name and a surname. Notable people with the name include:

- Sumanapala Dahanayake (1929–?), Sri Lankan politician
- Raja Sumanapala (1936–2003), Sri Lankan actor
- Rathna Sumanapala (born 1940), Sri Lankan actress
