= Gamini Susiriwardana =

Sri Lankan singer (1962–2021)

- ගාමිණී සුසිරිවර්ධන
- Born: Gamini Susiriwardana; 31 December 1962; Bentota, Sri Lanka
- Died: 14 November 2021 (aged 58); Colombo, Sri Lanka
- Education: Keenadeniya Maha Vidyalaya
- Occupations: Singer; musician; actor
- Children: 3
- Musical career
- Genres: Pop; soul; rhythm and blues; Classical music
- Instrument: Vocals
- Years active: 2007–2021
- Labels: Nilwala; MEntertainment; Evoke

Gamini Susiriwardana (Sinhala: ගාමිණී සුසිරිවර්ධන; 31 December 1962 – 14 November 2021), was a Sri Lankan singer and actor. One of the popular singers in Sri Lankan reality music industry, Susiriwardana entered the industry through the second season of Sirasa Superstar where he dominated indoor music for nearly 14 years since 2007.

== Personal life ==
Susiriwardana was born on 31 December 1962 in Bentota, Sri Lanka. He went to Keenadeniya Maha Vidyalaya, Ambepussa for education since 1974.

He was married and was a father of three children.

He had had cancer for a long time. He died on 14 November 2021 at the age of 58 while receiving treatment for cancer. His remains were laid to rest at 4 pm at his residence in Eagles, Bentota, Yathramulla. The last rites was performed at the Bentota Crematorium on November 15, 2021.

== Career ==
Before entering professional singing career, Susiriwardana joined a musical band and performed as a Calypso musician in Tourist Hotels in Aluthgama, Kalutara, and Bentota. He is the Sri Lankan singer which travelled in the most seaplane trips. Apart from that, he is also the second Sri Lankan musician after C.T. Fernando to perform in cruise ships and toured almost entire European countries except Rotterdam. Susiriwardena can sing in about 13 different languages.

In 2007, his sister sent an application for the second season of singing reality competition Sirasa Superstar. After the huge success in the first season, the second season made more contestants than the first season. He gradually entered the final 12 of the show, where he sang many popular songs such as; "Sal Sapuna", "Ahenawanam Hitha", "Koi Yanne", "Oba Wenuwen Ma" and "Suwanda Saban". Even though he was 45 years old at the competition, he made huge popularity in the show where he finished fourth place of the season behind Pradeep Rangana, Surendra Perera and Amila Nadeeshani.

After the show, he released his first solo, "Rathu Menike" which became popular. Since then, he made some notable solo hits such as: "Dannawada Man Dukin", "Ronde Yanawada Renda Hettaya", "Obata Kandulak Wela", "Nela Akasha Tharuka", "Hamuwanna Dakaganna", "Salli Salli" and "Awa Giya Than Ma Ha". He also released two albums in 2012, titled Rathu Mæṇikē and Nīla Akāsa Thārukā.

Meanwhile, in 2010, Susiriwardana made his film debut with the comedy detective film Mago Digo Dai directed by Srilal Priyadeva. In the film, he made the lead role "Constable I. O. Ari a.k.a. Digo" opposite to popular dramatist Vijaya Nandasiri. In the film, he made the playback singing with Neil Warnakulasuriya and sang the song "Anun Dipu Lanuwa Kala". Apart from that, he also made appearances in few television serials. In 2015, he made playback singing in the comedy film None Mage Sudu None directed by Eranga Senarathna where he sang the songs "Kadadasi Sarungal" with Shane Egodawatta and song "Sexy Roope Mage" with Mala Bharathi.
