= Devika Mihirani =

Sri Lankan actress

Devika Mihirani දේවිකා මිහිරානි
- Born: Naullage Devika Mihirani Perera; 21 March; Colombo, Sri Lanka
- Education: Anula Vidyalaya
- Occupation: Actress
- Years active: 1985–present
- Spouse: Vijaya Nandasiri (1989-2016)
- Children: 2
- Parents: William Perera (father); Kusum Perera (mother)
- Relatives: Lal Kularatne (cousin)

Naullage Devika Mihirani Perera (Sinhala: දේවිකා මිහිරානි), popularly known as Devika Mihirani, is an actress in Sri Lankan cinema, theater and television. She has the honor of being the first TV actress in Sri Lankan teledrama history.

== Personal life ==
She was born on 21 March as the third of the family of eight siblings. His father Naullage William Perera was a jockey and a steward. Her mother Kusum Perera was a housewife. Her mother died in 2017. Mihirani has one brother and six sisters. Mihirani completed education from Anula Vidyalaya, Nugegoda. Devika's sister Sriyani Perera is married to actor Lal Kularatne. One of her sister's children Sakura Kumari, Sachi Deepankara, Shanthimala and Malkanthi are involved in drama productions. She studied Kandyan dancing with Daya Nellampitiya and then under Somadasa Niththavela at Sudarshi, Bullers Lane.

She was married to popular actor and dramatist Vijaya Nandasiri. Their first encounter was at Sudarshi Visual Arts Center, where Mihirani studied for dancing under Somadasa Niththavela. Nandasiri was the one who invited Mihirani for the drama Subha Saha Yasa in 1974. They married in 1989. On 8 August 2016, Nandasiri died at the age of 69 while being taken to the Kalubowila Teaching Hospital after suffering from a cardiac arrest.

The couple has one daughter, Navanjana Dulanjali and one son, Rasanjana Suchitra. Navanjana born in 1990 and studied at Visakha Vidyalaya. She worked at the Soviet Cultural Centre as a teacher and followed a Mass Communication Diploma at the University of Sri Jayewardenepura. She currently lives in Australia. Navanjana was born on 13 November 1989. Navanjana is married to businessman Chaminda Gunaratne and they married on 28 December 2012 in Hilton Colombo. Rasanjana was born in 1994 and is a past pupil of Royal College, Colombo. He worked in stage lighting before entering acting with parents in the stage play Wrushabha Raja. After the death of his father, Rasanjana started to continue his legacy by acting in many stage plays and advertisements.

== Acting career ==
At the age of 18, she joined the chorus in the popular play Maname. Then at the age of 21, she got the opportunity to act in the television serial Dimuthu Muthu. Mihirani holds the record to be the main actress in the first TV television serial Dimuthu Muthu telecast in Sri Lanka as well as a record in South Asian television. The serial was directed by D.B. Nihalsinghe and Mihirani played the role "Nanda", an innocent pretty girl. She won the best actress award and the Popular actress awards for her role as well. She also became the most popular actress for three consequent years for her television serials in the 1980s.

After the serial, she started to act in serials Rekha, Sulanga and Sudu saha Kalu. Her maiden cinema appearance came through the 1979 film Hingana Kolla directed by K.A.W. Perera. In 2019, she was appointed as one of the jury member for Sumathi Awards.

== Filmography ==
Year	Film	Role	Ref.
1979	Hingana Kolla		
1982	Ridee Nimnaya		
1984	Biththi Hathara		
1984	Ranmalige Wasanawa		
