= Anura Horatious =

- Born: Colombo, Sri Lanka.
- Occupation: Novelist
- Genre: Crime, Crime fiction

Anura Horatious (Sinhala: අනුර හොරේෂස්) is a popular Sri Lankan author of crime fiction, best known for the bestselling novel Gini Avi Saha Gini Keli (Sinhala: ගිණි අවි සහ ගිණි කෙළි, (Firearms and Fireworks). The novel was later adapted into an award-winning film by Udayakantha Warnasuriya in 1998, with the sequel Gini Avi Saha Gini Keli 2 (Sinhala: ගිනි අවි සහ ගිනිකෙළි 2, English: Firearms and Fireworks 2) being released in September 2024. In 2003, Horatious directed his first film, Sonduru Dadabima (A Pleasurable Huntland).
