= Sarath Chandrasiri =

Sri Lankan actor (1964–2021)

Sarath Chandrasiri සරත් චන්ද්‍රසිරි
- Born: Sarath Chandrasiri; 13 June 1964; Panadura, Ceylon
- Died: 4 December 2021 (aged 57); Colombo, Sri Lanka
- Education: Sri Sumangala College Panadura
- Occupation: Actor
- Years active: 1980-2021
- Spouse: Charika Jayamali
- Children: 2

Sarath Chandrasiri (13 June 1964 – 4 December 2021: as සරත් චන්ද්‍රසිරි) [Sinhala]) was an actor in Sri Lankan cinema, theater and television. He is best known for the role "Samagipura Wasantha" in popular television serial Paba and role "Ukkuwa" in the serial Malee.

== Personal life ==
He was born on 13 June 1964 in Panadura, Ceylon. He went to Wekada Bauddhaloka Vidyalaya where he met drama teacher Sarath Kulanga. Later he was educated at Sri Sumangala Vidyalaya, Panadura.

Chandrasiri is married to longtime partner Charika Jayamali. The couple has one son – Kanchuka Thilakshana, and one daughter – Hasara Nilakshi. Kanchuka is an engineer graduated from University of Moratuwa. Hasara is a physics graduate at University of Sri Jayewardenepura.

On 21 November 2016, Chandrasiri was hospitalized by a brief illness while working in a stage play. He was rushed into the Alpitiya hospital. In November 2021, he was again hospitalized and has been receiving treatment at the Intensive Care Unit of the Colombo National Hospital for the many weeks due to an internal hemorrhage. During that period, false rumors circulated that he died at the hospital. Later on 4 December 2021, he died at the age of 57 while receiving treatment at National Hospital, Colombo due to cerebral hemorrhage. Funeral service was held on 6 December 2021 at 4.00 pm at the Walgama Crematorium in Bandaragama.

== Career ==
Chandrasiri made his acting debut in 1976 on the school stage. In 1979, he won the Best Actor award at the All Island Drama Competition, opened the doors of the stage with the stage play 'Ahas Maliga' produced by veteran songstress Chandrika Siriwardena. Then he started drama career under the guidance of his teacher Sarath Kulanga. Meanwhile, he met several other playwrights including Janak Premalal and Jayalath Manoratne through Kulanga. Under them he acted in many stage plays such as Abuddassa Kolama, Raja Kapuru, Andarela, Thalamala Pipila, Guru Tharuwa and Puthra Samagama.

He made his television debut with the serial Sankranthi Samaya directed by Ananda Abenayake. In the preceding years, he joined with many television serials such as: Asani Væsi, Varaperaḷiya, Doo Daruvō, Punchi Vīrayō, Aḍō, Damsārī and Mahaviru Paṇḍu. In 2006, he joined with the regular cast of popular soap opera Paba where he played the popular role of "Samagipura Wasantha". Later he made the many notable roles in the serials including: as "Kuṇu Anṭā" in Depath Nayi, as "Perum Puli" in Wasantha Kusalana, as "Majan" in Ransirigē Sangrāmaya, as "Baṇḍā" as Hiru Soyā, as "Tikiri Baṇḍā" in Guru Tharuva, as "Hanumanthā" in Wesgattō, as "Saraa" in Jodu Gedara and as "Veda Mahaththayā" in Neela Pabaḷu. Meanwhile in 2011, he made the sub lead role "Ukkuwa" in the supernatural drama Malee. After the huge popularity, he reprised the role in second season of the show titled Aththamma. In the third season Sidu he made a cameo role in few early episodes.

In 2000, he made his film debut with a minor role of "Purple shirt shooter" in the crime film Rajya Sevaya Pinisai directed by Udayakantha Warnasuriya. Since then he received many villain and thug roles in the films such as; One Shot, Samanala Thatu, Sudu Hansi, Mago Digo Dai and Gamani. Meanwhile, he made the role "Devil" in children's film Ran Kevita. After series of supportive and minor roles in cinema, he made the sub lead role of "Circuit Sarath" in the comedy drama Dr. Nawariyan. His final acting appearance came through the role "Anton, the bus driver" in the television serial Rella Veralata Adarei in 2021.

=== Selected stage plays ===
- Abuddassa Kolama
- Andarela
- Chawdari
- Dennek Na Ekkenai
- Eka Sakkuwe
- Guru Tharuwa
- Ko Kukko
- Kolam Pure
- Mee Harak
- Nari Burathi
- Puthra Samagama
- Raja Kapuru
- Romba Thanks
- Sooti Gamarala Saha Raigam Banda
- Thalamala Pipila

=== Selected television serials ===
- Ado
- Akkaragala
- Asani Vesi
- Aththamma
- Chandi Kumarihami
- Damsaari
- Depath Nai
- Doo Daruwo
- Ganga Langa Gedara
- Grahembel Wath Hithuwada
- Handapana
- Hiru Soya
- Jodu Gedara
- Kethumathi
- Maddahana
- Mahaviru Pandu
- Malee
- Minigandela
- Neela Pabalu
- Paba
- Pawena Yakada
- Piththala Konderuma
- Punchi Weerayo
- Ralla Weralata Adarei
- Ran Poruwa
- Ransirige Sangramaya
- Salmal Aramaya
- Sandawatha Seya
- Sankranthi Samaya
- Sidu
- Sihina Samagama
- Susuma
- Vara Peraliya
- Wasantha Kusalana

== Filmography ==
Key
†	Denotes films that have not yet been released

Year	Film	Role	Ref.
2000	Rajya Sevaya Pinisai	Purple shirt shooter	
2002	Bahubuthayo	Street devil	
2003	Le Kiri Kandulu	Court bailiff	
2004	Samawenna Ma Raththarane		
2005	One Shot	Poisoning waiter	
2005	Samanala Thatu	Money exchanger	
2006	Kurulu Pihatu	Waiter	
2007	Sikuru Hathe	Police constable	
2007	Ran Kevita	Devil	
2010	Sudu Hansi	Shami's guard	
2010	Mago Digo Dai	Kuhakawaththe Chandare	
2010	Tikiri Suwanda	Chandare	
2011	Challenges	Bag thief	
2011	Gamani	LTTE cadre	
2014	Thanha Rathi Ranga		
2015	Ira Sewaya		
2015	Gindari	Malkanthi's drunken uncle	
2015	Mage Yalu Malu	Driver	
2016	Patibhana		
2016	Madhura Charika	Sudath	
2016	Maya 3D	Kapuwa	
2016	64 Mayam	Almeda	
2017	Wassanaye Sanda	Traffic sergeant	
2017	Paha Samath	Village farmer	
2017	Dr. Nawariyan	Circuit Sarath	
2018	Nidahase Piya DS	Driver Karolis	
2019	President Super Star	Police media spokesman	
2019	Reload	Driver Sanath Vipuladeva	
2020	Tsunami	Gurunnanse	
2020	The Newspaper	Village monk	
2021	Nihada Sewaneli		
2022	Hithumathe Jeewithe	Maru Sira	
2022	Gindari 2		
2023	Midunu Vishwaya		
TBA	Uyanata Mal Genna †		
TBA	Akarsha †		
TBA	Angara †		
TBA	Adarei Jaanu †		
TBA	Rosa Kale Api Yan †		

== Awards ==
=== Raigam Tele'es ===
Year	Nominee / work	Award	Result
2007	Wasantha Kusalana	Best Supporting Actor	Won
