= Wilson Gunaratne =

Sri Lankan actor and comedian

Wilson Gunaratne විල්සන් ගුණරත්න
- Born: 9 March 1949 (age 76); Kadawatha, Sri Lanka
- Education: Kalutara Vidyalaya; Sri Dharmaloka College
- Occupations: Actor, comedian, director
- Years active: 1983 – present

Wilson Gunaratne (born March 9, 1949, as විල්සන් ගුණරත්න [Sinhala]) is an actor and comedian in Sri Lankan cinema, stage drama and television. He is most notable for the role of Kodithuwakku in television comedy sitcom Nonavaruni Mahathvaruni and stage drama Charitha Atak. It is the only stage play in Sri Lanka in which one actor portrays eight different characters with eight different voices.

== Acting career ==
At that time when he was working in an executive position in the field of hotel management, Gunaratne met Tony Ranasinghe through his elder brother. Under his guidance, Gunaratne played a minor role in a scene shot in the hotel premises for a film. Then Tony nominated Gunaratne for the role of the 'Duke' in Shakespeare's translation stage play Veniciye Welenda directed by playwright Bandula Vithanage. The play marked the turning point of his acting career. Later he performed in two of Vithanage's plays: Sakala Jana, Muhuṇu Dekak. Meanwhile, he did a scientific study of comedy at IFT, an affiliate of the University of Noida, New Delhi.

He was introduced to teledrama under the guidance of former parliamentary translator and actor Alfred Perera. Alfred has worked in China and the Philippines Radio. He invited Gunaratne to the orchestra for the popular television serial Vinoda Samaya program aired by the Sri Lanka Broadcasting Corporation. He was the drummer of that program. His maiden cinema acting came through film Samuganimi Ma Samiyani directed by his elder brother. Then he got a chance to play in his brother's second directed film Sasaraka Pethuma.

Gunaratne was highly popularized with the television sitcom Nonavaruni Mahathvaruni through the character Kodithuwakku. In the meantime, he acted in the serial Sathpura Wasiyo with the role "Pappa" which made his hallmark in drama career. Apart from that, he produced a political comedy stage drama titled Charitha Hathak, which was later updated into Charitha Atak. Since its opening, Charitha Hathak has completed 37 shows within eight months. His seven characters include, Kodituwakku from "Nonava-runi Mahatvaruni", Pappa, Prof. Pragnaratne, Transport Teacher Mr. Bastian, Prof. Marenzie (Italian).

In 1998, he made first directorial debut with the television political satire Kodivinaya telecast by ITN.

=== Selected stage dramas ===
- Charitha Hathak
- Charitha Atak

=== Selected television serials ===
- Bhavana - Amuttha
- Charitha Dekak
- Hathara Wate
- Kinihiraka Pipi Mal
- Kodivinaya
- Kiyadenna Adare Tharam
- Kula Kumariya
- Kulavilokanaya
- Nonavaruni Mahathvaruni
- Kathura
- Sadisi Tharanaya
- Vinivindimi
- Willy King Show
- Yes Madam

== Filmography ==
Key
†	Denotes film or TV productions that have not yet been released

Year	Film	Roles	Ref.
1983	Samuganimi Ma Samiyani		
1985	Adara Kathawa		
1986	Koti Waligaya		
1987	Sathyagrahanaya	Lockout orator	
1990	Thanha Asha		
1991	Keli Madala	Office Ranjani greeter	
1998	Gini Avi Saha Gini Keli	Paththini Charles	
1999	Theertha Yathra		
2000	Pem Kekula	Jayathunga	
2003	Thani Thatuwen Piyabanna	Garage owner	
2012	A Common Man	Prakash Kumar	
2012	Jeevithe Lassanai	Jayasundara, Wishwa's father	
2013	Kauda Machan Alice		
2013	Samanala Sandhawaniya	Danny, Vadisha's Manager	
2013	Double Trouble		
2013	Sri Siddhartha Gautama	Sage Asitha	
2015	None Mage Sudu None	Hector	
2017	Ali Kathawa	Maha Amathi	
2018	Bimba Devi Alias Yashodhara	Sage Asitha	
2019	Thaala	Secretary Senaratne	
2019	President Super Star	J.R. Jayawardena dummy	
2020	Suparna	Professor	
2020	Eka Gei Sokari		
2026	Abheetha		
