= Gini Avi Saha Gini Keli 2 =

Gini Avi Saha Gini Keli: Chapter 2
- Directed by: Udayakantha Warnasuriya
- Written by: Anura Horatious; Udayakantha Warnasuriya
- Story by: Anura Horatious
- Produced by: Udayakantha Warnasuriya
- Starring: Isuru Lokuhettiarachchi; Dhanuka Dilshan; Lucky Dias; Rathna Lalani Jayakody; Palitha Silva; Rangana Premaratne
- Cinematography: Ayeshmantha Hettiarachchi
- Edited by: Ruwan Chamara
- Music by: Chitral Somapala
- Production company: EAP Theatres
- Release date: 26 September 2024
- Language: Sinhala

Gini Avi Saha Gini Keli: Chapter 2 (Sinhala: ගිනි අවි සහ ගිනිකෙළි 2, English: Firearms and Fireworks 2) is a 2024 Sri Lankan Sinhalese crime film directed and produced by Udayakantha Warnasuriya for Bahuroo Films. The film served as a sequel to the 1998 blockbuster film Gini Avi Saha Gini Keli, directed and produced by the same director. The film is based on a popular fictitious novel written by Anura Horatious. It stars an ensemble cast of Isuru Lokuhettiarachchi, Dhanuka Dilshan, Rathna Lalani Jayakody and Roger Seneviratne, Gihan Fernando, Kusal Maduranga and Jagath Benaragama. Several actors reprised their roles from previous film including Lucky Dias, Palitha Silva and Rangana Premaratne.

The film received mixed reviews from critics.

== Cast ==
- Isuru Lokuhettiarachchi as Bogahawatte Lucky
- Dhanuka Dilshan as Manju
- Lucky Dias as Samson
- Rathna Lalani Jayakody as Manju's mother
- Palitha Silva as Kotiyagoda Nihal
- Rangana Premaratne as police OIC
- Kumara Vandurassa as K. Hemasiri, the prime minister
- Roger Seneviratne as Peter
- Anura Bandara Rajaguru as Kaduwela Harold
- Gihan Fernando as Mohammad
- Srimal Wedisinghe as Minister Paul
- Anura Horatious as Patty, Manju's uncle
- Kusal Maduranga as Tharaka, Manju's friend
- Jagath Benaragama as Nihal's henchman
- Wilson Karu as Gune
- Kalana Gunasekara as Sunil
- Sunitha Wimalaweera as Manju's aunt
- Asanga Perera as Minister's thug
- Nimal Pallewatta as Minister Samarakone
- Menuka Premaratne as Minister Jinadasa Amarathunga
- Bhanu Kodikara as Hemasiri's friend
- Nandana Hettiarachchi as technical officer
- Madushan Nanayakkara as Police officer
- Viraj Malinga as Lucky's henchman
- Rajitha Rodrigu as Minister's security guard
- Mehan Hettiarachchi
- Kapila Sigera as Murgavili
- Prasad Suriyaarachchi as Human Rights Commissioner
- Desitha Kavinda
- Tara Kaluarachchi as prostitute
- Navod Lakshan
- Ayesha Madhushani as Kanthi, Manju's aunt
- Ranjith Rubasinghe as Samson's gunman
- Sandun Bandara as Belek Kade Lal
- Ishara Athukorala as News reader

== Production ==
This is the 27th cinema direction by veteran filmmaker Udayakantha Warnasuriya, whose last film Ridee Seenu was released in March 2024. The film co-produced by director and writer themselves along with Kumara Wadurassa, Dunstan Athula, Latha Warnasuriya, Madhurangi Welivita, Ashoka Jayalath, Ruwan Dissanayake and Sahan Warnasuriya. Cinematography done by Ayeshmantha Hettiarachchi with the assistance of Harshana Karunathilake, Kasun Chamara, Tamindu Dilshan Alwis and Saheesha Thomas. Ruwan Chamara Ranasinghe is the editor and Color grade by Krishan Kodithuwakku. Assistant director is Donald Jayantha and sound mixer is Shasika Ruwan Marasinghe. Art Direction handled by Aheliyagoda Somathilaka with the assistance of Palitha Madanayake, Chamara Hettiarachi, whereas makeup done by Nalin Premathilaka.

Production management done by Ashoka Ariyaratne and still photography by Dhammika Pathiratne. Both music direction and vocals done by Chitral Somapala, who also helped with lyrics along with Anura Bandara Rajaguru. Lighting co-handled by Yapa Bandara, Buddhika Kelum, Gayathra Brandy Gampola and Amila Sampath Guruge. The film was shot in and around Colombo and suburban locations. According to the director, about eighty scenes were used for this movie for 40 days.
