= Randiya Dahara =

Randiya Dahara රන්දිය දහර
- Directed by: Udayakantha Warnasuriya
- Written by: Udayakantha Warnasuriya
- Produced by: R.J Films
- Starring: Geetha Kumarasinghe; Kamal Addararachchi; Jackson Anthony
- Cinematography: K. D. Dayananda; Jayanath Gunawardena
- Edited by: Stanley de Alwis
- Music by: Premasiri Khemadasa
- Production company: Dil Process Lab
- Distributed by: CEL Theaters
- Release date: 17 December 2004
- Running time: 125 minutes
- Country: Sri Lanka
- Language: Sinhala

Randiya Dahara (Golden Water) (Sinhala: රන්දිය දහර) is a 2004 Sri Lankan Sinhala drama film directed by Udayakantha Warnasuriya and produced by Neil Ranjth Palliyaguruge for R.J Films. It stars Geetha Kumarasinghe and Kamal Addararachchi in lead roles along with Jackson Anthony and Mahendra Perera. Music composed by veteran musician Premasiri Khemadasa. It is the 1045th Sri Lankan film in the Sinhala cinema.

Shooting was completed from fifty days in the locations in and around Colombo, Divulapitiya and Diyatalawa.

== Cast ==
- Geetha Kumarasinghe as Amali Weerasuriya
- Kamal Addararachchi as Captain Samantha Weerasuriya
- Jackson Anthony as Lionel
- Anula Karunathilaka as Samantha's Amma
- Mahendra Perera as Kulatunga
- Sanath Gunathilake as Colonel Chanuka Hettiarachchi
- Jeevan Kumaratunga as Lieutenant Colonel Viraj Thenuwara
- Henry Jayasena as Samantha's father
- Buddhika Jayaratne as Captain Cyril
- Udula Dabare as Amali's mother
- Seetha Kumari as Samantha's aunt
- Ranjith Rubasinghe as Lionel's henchman
- Milton Jayawardena as Major Saliya
- Gunawardena Hettiarachchi as Cyrus agency agent
- G.R Perera as Loan agent
- Palitha Galappaththi as Repossessed car driver
- Rathna Lalani Jayakody as Lionel's wife

== Soundtrack ==
No.	Title	Lyrics	Singer(s)	Length
1.	"Hadawanna Hadawanna"	Lucian Bulathsinhala	Nelu Adhikari
