= Geetha Kumarasinghe =

Sri Lankan actress, producer and politician

Hon. Geetha Kumarasinghe
- ගීතා කුමාරසිංහ கீதா குமாரசிங்க
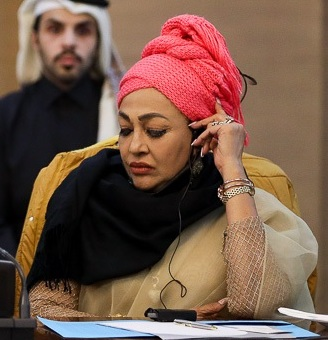
- Kumarasinghe in 2023

Minister of State for Women and Child Affairs
- In office 8 September 2022 – 24 September 2024
- President: Ranil Wickremesinghe
- Prime Minister: Dinesh Gunawardena

Minister of State for Cultural and Performing Arts
- In office 18 April 2022 – 9 May 2022
- President: Gotabaya Rajapaksa
- Prime Minister: Mahinda Rajapaksa

Member of Parliament for Galle District
- In office 20 August 2020 – 24 September 2024
- Majority: 63,357 Preferential Votes
- In office 1 September 2015 – 3 May 2017
- Succeeded by: Piyasena Gamage
- Majority: 63,955 Preferential Votes

Personal details
- Born: Kumara Vidugalage Dona Geetha Samanmalee Kumarasinghe; 5 July 1955 (age 71) Badulla, Sri Lanka
- Party: Sri Lanka Podujana Peramuna
- Spouse: Chris Fuhrer Ferdinand (m 1977; div 2018)
- Education: Sangamitta Girls College
- Occupation: Film actress
- Awards: Sarasaviya Best Actress Award; Sarasaviya Most Popular Actress Award

Kumara Vidugalage Dona Geetha Samanmalee Kumarasinghe (born 5 July 1955: Sinhala: ගීතා කුමාරසිංහ), popularly known as Geetha Kumarasinghe, is a Sri Lankan film actress & politician. She previously served as a Member of a Parliament as well as being the State Minister of Women and Child Affairs from 2022 to 2024.

She made her debut in veteran director K. A. W. Perera's 1975 film, Wasana but it was Neil Rupasinghe's Lassana Kella which was released first. Since then, She is often referred to as "the prettiest girl" (සිංහල සිනමාවේ ලස්සන කෙල්ල) on Sri Lankan silver screen and she has appeared in over 80 movies, winning the Sarasaviya Best Actress Award four times, in 1991, 1996, 2000 and 2004. She has also received the Sarasaviya Most Popular Actress Award) several times.

== Early life ==
She was born on 5 July 1955 in Hamburugala village, Bentara, Sri Lanka as the eldest of the family. Her father Wijepala Kumarasinghe first worked as a warehouse manager at the Navy Headquarters. As a journalist, he made several columns, Buddhist articles and worked as a deputy editor of the 'Bauddhaya' newspaper for some time. Her mother Udulawathi Siriwardena was a housewife. She grew up in Bentara, Elpitiya and had her education at Elpitiya Ananda College, Aluthgama and Holy Family Convent, Kalutara. She was also a talented member of the netball team during her college days. She has five younger sisters: Nayana, Kokila, Dammika, Dinusha, Shyama and two younger brothers: Thilak and Upendra.

Her father's elder sister Aruna Wickramapala was married to Hinni Appuhamy's aka Maliban Mudalali's brother A. G. Wickramapala. Geetha's father died in 1983 and mother in 2016.

== Career ==
As a child, she showed her talent for singing and dancing. She played the role of 'Kundalakeshi' in the play Chora Pabbatha on the school stage. Though her father did not approve of a film career. Meanwhile, the neighbors demanded her parents submit Geetha to the 'Avurudu Rupa Sundari' competition organized by the 'Savasa' newspaper in Bentota. Dad gave the permission after the request of family friend Amitha Abeysekara. In 1973 at the age of 16, Geetha won the competition. During the participation in the beauty pageant, her mother was always with her. Her aunt, Anula Wickramapala, was also a friend of renowned director Lester James Peiris. Incidentally, her aunts' mansion was used as the location for his film Ransalu. Little Geetha, who used to spend her school vacations in her aunt's house in Kollupitiya would imitate Punya Heendeniya, her childhood heroine.

She signed contracts for 21 films before her debut film was released, a record in Sri Lankan Cinema. It was in the year 1975 that Geetha debuted in K.A.W. Perera's Vasana but it was Neil Rupasinghe's Lassana Kella which reached cinemas first. Kumarasinghe, who is often cast in controversial roles, has also performed the foreign films Pakistani, Hindi, Japanese, Tamil and French productions. She acted opposite Sivaji Ganesan in Mohana Punnagai which was released on 1981. During the filming of Podi Malli in Bambarakele, Nuwara Eliya in 1976, her car met with a major accident and then she had plastic surgery on the face.

She received critical acclaim in roles such as 'Dulcie' in Pembara Madhu, 'Dotty' in Palama Yata, 'Punna' in Lokuduwa and 'Amali' in Ran Diya Dahara. In the novel 'Palama Yata' written by Kulasena Fonseka, it was made into the film adaptation where Geetha was the lead actress as well as is producer. She won 10 awards at the 1991 Sarasaviya Awards, 09 awards at the Swarna Sankha Awards, 07 OCIC Awards and a total of 26 awards. Geetha won both Best Actress Award and the Best Producer Award for this film. It was also the highest-grossing film of all time at the Regal Cinema for 100 consecutive days. Geetha also represented Sri Lanka at the 1990 Singapore International Film Festival with the film.

In 2006, she launched official website with a ceremony at Water's Edge at Battaramulla. As a film producer, she later produced the films Salambak Handai, Loku Duwa, Anuragaye Ananthaya, Wasuli and Geetha. Both of her productions, Palama Yata and Loku Duwa won her the Best Film Awards at the Sarasaviya Awards Festival.

== Awards ==
Year	Organization	Award	Film
1981	National Film Festival	Best Supporting Actress	
1988	National Film Festival	Best Supporting Actress	
1990	OCIC Merit Awards		Palama Yata
1990	Sarasaviya Awards Festival	Best Actress	Palama Yata
1990	Sarasaviya Awards Festival	Most Popular Actress	
1990	Swarna Sanka Film festival	Best Actress	Palama Yata
1996	Sarasaviya Awards Festival	Best Actress	Loku Duwa
1996	Swarna Sanka Film festival	Best Actress	Loku Duwa
1997	National Film Festival	Best Actress	Loku Duwa
2000	National film festival	Talented Performance	Anuragaye Ananthaya
2000	Sarasaviya Awards festival	Best Actress	Rajya Sevaya Pinisai
2000	National Film Festival	Best Actress	Rajya Sevaya Pinisai
2004	Sarasaviya Awards Festival	Best Actress	Ran Diya Dahara
2005	Signis Salutation	Most Outstanding Performance	Ran Diya Dahara
2005	National Film Festival	Best Actress	Ran Diya Dahara

== Political career ==
Geetha was an ardent supporter of Mahinda Rajapakse at 2010 presidential elections and was appointed as the chief organizer to Elpitiya electorate. She unsuccessfully contested at the 2010 general elections and blamed election irregularities for her defeat.

She contested the provincial council elections in 2014 and took oath as a counselor at the Southern Provincial Council.

Geetha contested for the 2015 Parliamentary Election from Galle District. She was elected to the 15th Sri Lankan Parliament by receiving 63,955 preferential votes.

On 3 May 2017, the Sri Lanka courts disqualified her as a member of parliament because she had held dual citizenship in Sri Lanka and Switzerland. Under the constitution of Sri Lanka, no person can be elected to the parliament if they hold dual citizenship. She applied in supreme courts, but the supreme courts reconfirm that she is disqualified to hold office as a member of parliament because she had held dual citizenship in Sri Lanka and Switzerland.

== Controversy ==
In a parliament session in November 2015 Kumarasinghe complained the lack of time given to her and made a communal statement claiming that ethnic minority Tamil members from the north received more time than her unaware that the time allocated for her was decided by her own party. She also criticised the lifting of highly discriminatory taxes on imported English and Tamil dramas. Kumarasinghe's parliamentary seat could be taken away as a result of the ongoing court case challenging her becoming a lawmaker while holding Swiss nationality and is having her own court battle after being accused of ignorance of the constitution.

== Injury ==
On 2 September 2017, she was admitted to a private hospital in Colombo with burn injuries. Reports said that injuries sustained in a domestic accident when a gas leak caused an explosion in her home, where her abdominal area and legs were sustained with injuries.

== Filmography ==
Though her first act came through film Wasana, it was released on cinemas on 1975 after two of her late films were screened. She quit from cinema after award-winning film Randiya Dahara and focused on politics. However, after 10 years, she played a minor role in Siri Daladagamanaya in 2014.

- No. denotes the Number of Sri Lankan film in the Sri Lankan cinema.

Year	No.	Film	Role
1975	317	Lassana Kella	Geetha
1975	324	Damayanthi	
1976	336	Wasana	Pushpa
1976	341	Kolomba Sanniya	Susila
1976	347	Asha	
1976	351	Onna Mame Kella Panapi	
1976	358	Ran Thilaka	
1977	366	Niluka	
1977	367	Pembara Madhu	
1977	375	Chandi Putha	Geetha
1977	377	Aege Adara Kathawa	Kanthi
1977	378	Maruwa Samaga Wase	Menika
1978	408	Ahasin Polawata	
1978	389	Seetha Devi	Goddess Ramba
1978	391	Maduwanthi	Maduwanthi
1978	396	Saara	Sara
1978	403	Deepanjali	
1978	407	Apeksha	Menaka
1979	410	Samanmalee	Samanmali
1979	412	Minisum Athara Minisek	Indu
1979	414	Jeevana Kandulu	Geetha
1979	428	Akke Mata Awasara	Thanuja
1979	430	Sawdan Jema	Vinodani
1979	433	Podi Malli	Nalika
1980	449	Siribo Ayya	Emma Nona
1980	455	Ganga Addara	Miss de Soysa
1980	456	Karumakkarayo	J.A Somawathi
1980	466	Api Dedena	Himali
1981		Mohana Punnagai	Gawiri. Tamil film, acted with Sivaji Ganesan
1981	470	Kolamkarayo	Naticia
1981	473	Ranga	Sunali "Punchi Hamu"
1981	477	Walampuri	Rasamma
1981	494	Anjaana	Anjaana
1981	497	Sathara Diganthaya	
1981	495	Hodama Naluwa	
1982	506	Mahagedara	Kumari Malwinna
1982	526	Kiri Suwanda	Madani
1982	527	Sithara	
1982	530	Thakkita Tharikita	
1982	532	Major Sir	
1983	550	Yali Pipunu Malak	
1983	549	Siv Ranga Sena	Surangi
1983	573	Hithath Hondai Wadath Hondai	
1983	575	Bonikka	Renuka 'Renu' Serasinghe
1984	602	Maya	Neela Dias
1984	597	Himakathara	Manika
1984	610	Jaya Sikurui	
1985	613	Mawbima Nathinam Maranaya	
1985	615	Chalitha Rangali	Producer and actor
1986		Nobody Is Perfect	
1986	645	Jaya Apitai	
1986	646	Koti Waligaya	Nilmini
1986	648	Sura Saradiyel	Thangamma
1986	652	Sinha Patau	
1987	661	Yukthiyada Shakthiyada	
1987	665	Rajawadakarayo	Rekha
1987	668	Obatai Priye Adare	Tina
1988	672	Ayya Nago	
1988	676	Amme Oba Nisa	
1988	679	Durga	
1989	686	Badulu Kochchiya	
1990	709	Palama Yata	Dottie. Also as producer.
1991	720	Dolos Mahe Pahana	
1991	731	Salabak Hadai	also as producer.
1992	752	Malsara Doni	Teena
1992	764	Muwan Palessey Kadira	
1993	787	Nelum Saha Samanmali	
1993	789	Lagin Giyoth Aehak Naha	
1993	791	Madara Parasathu	Jinadari Dias
1994	802	Abiyogaya	
1994	799	Ambu Samiyo	Nandawatte Manike
1995	820	Inspector Geetha	Inspector Geetha
1995	841	Chandini	Chandini
1995	843	Sudu Walassu	
1996	857	Hitha Honda Gahaniyak	
1996	860	Loku Duwa	also as producer.
1997	884	Raththaran Minihek	
1998	892	Yuda Gini Mada	
1999	926	Sathaydewi	Chandrawathi
2000	938	Rajya Sevaya Pinisai	Mahesha Upamali
2000	943	Anuragaye Ananthaya	Kanchana Swarnadipathi. also as producer.
2004	1045	Randiya Dahara	Amali
2014	1203	Siri Daladagamanaya	
