= Sujatha Puthra =

- official DVD cover
- සුජාත පුත්‍ර
- Directed by: Sripali Hettiarachchi
- Written by: Nihal Premachandra
- Produced by: AIBA Films
- Starring: Pramuditha Udaya Kumara; Harshi Rasanga; Dilhani Ekanayake
- Cinematography: Sajeewa Sankalpa
- Edited by: Sajeewa Sankalpa
- Music by: Sajeewa Sankalpa
- Distributed by: MPI & LFD Theaters
- Release date: 7 October 2016
- Country: Sri Lanka

Sujatha Puthra (Legitimate Son) (Sinhala: සුජාත පුත්‍ර) is a 2016 Sri Lankan Sinhala-language drama film written and directed by Sripali Hettiarachchi and produced by director himself with Amila Rashendra for AIBA Films. The film stars two child artists Pramuditha Udaya Kumara and Harshi Rasanga in the lead roles along with popular artists Dilhani Ekanayake, Mihira Sirithilaka and Nayana Kumari in supportive roles. Cinemaography, editing and music composed by Sajeewa Sankalpa. It is the 1258th Sri Lankan film in the Sinhala cinema.

== Plot ==
Sumudu is an eight-years-old boy. He is a wise boy and also clever to learning. A few months after the baby is born, he loses his father's love forever. Sumudu's mother is young. Still beautiful in beauty too. She makes a living from the meager wages she earns. They live in a rented house. Homeowner seeks Sumudhu's mother But when the landlord finds out that she is not able to pay the money, he makes an improper proposal to Sumudhu's mother.

He tells her not to rent if she agrees. Sumudu's mother lived a life of self-respect till now. Despite the harassment and harassment of the landlord, she vehemently rejected the proposal. For Sumudhu feels this. The mother also learns that she will have to leave the house shortly. Sumudhu's next step is to own a house somehow.

Sumudu decides to meet the Minister in charge of the province. But he did not know of a possible course of action. In the end, attempts to meet the Minister through the senior monks of the temple were unsuccessful. The monks who soon offered to help Sumudhu also died, making Sumudhu even more helpless. Somehow he finds the minister's phone number and speaks to the minister across the smooth length.

Sumudu also comes to a function he attends and asks the Minister for a house. Will Sumudhu's intention be fulfilled in the end? What will be the fate of Sumudu and his mother? Will Sumudhu's family fall prey to the homeowner?

== Cast ==
- Pramuditha Udaya Kumara as Sumudu
- Harshi Rasanga as Dilini
- Dilhani Ekanayake as Mrs. Hettiarachchi
- Nayana Kumari as Sumudu's mother
- Kumara Thirimadura as Mudalali
- Ravindra Randeniya as Minister
- Mihira Sirithilaka as Dayasena
- Nanda Wickrama
- Lakshman Amarasekara
- Nihal Premachandra
- Diana Hettiarachchi
- Upul Weerasinghe
