= Mahinda Pathirage =

Sri Lankan actor

Mahinda Pathirage මහින්ද පතිරගේ
- Born: 22 March 1952 (age 74); Anuradhapura, Sri Lanka
- Education: Walisinghe Harischandra Maha Vidyalaya
- Occupations: Actor, comedian, director
- Years active: 1976–present
- Spouse: Kumudini Gunawardhana
- Children: 2
- Father: Hendrick Appuhami

Thanthrige Pathirage Mahinda (born March 22, 1952, as මහින්ද පතිරගේ) [Sinhala]), popularly known as Mahinda Pathirage, is an actor in Sri Lankan cinema, stage drama and television. Acting particularly in comedy roles, Pathirage is best known for the role Purohitha in television sitcom Raja Sabhawa.

== Personal life ==
Mahinda was born on 22 March 1952 in Anuradhapura. His father was Thanthiri Pathirage Hendrick Appuhami. He has 10 siblings in the family. He completed education until grade 10 from Walisinghe Harischandra Maha Vidyalaya. Before entering to drama, he continued his father's business as photo framer and painter.

Mahinda is married to Kumudini Gunawardhana and the couple has one daughter, Nipuni Sharada and one son, Nandun Nisanka.

== Career ==
In 1976, he along with many artists in Anuradhapura formed a drama group called Jana Nalu Kela. He first played in the play Aruma Naruma produced by Anuradha Ranjith. He won a merit award for his role in that play. In 1977–79, he worked in Rajarata Sevaya of Sri Lanka Broadcasting Corporation along with his friend Gunadasa Madurasinghe. He took part in a radio play Rasavita produced by Premakeerthi de Alwis.

Mahinda started acting career with 1997 television serial Depethi Dahara directed by Malini Fonseka. In 2000, he acted in popular television comedy Sina Sagaraya telecast by Rupavahini. Then in 2003, he joined with Swarnavahini for the sitcom Raja Sabhawa along with Gunadasa Madurasinghe. The drama gave him enormous popularity, which was later produced into a stage play as well. In 1983, he won the award for the Best Actor in Youth Drama Festival for the role in stage play Paarajika.

His maiden cinema acting came through 2000 film Saroja directed by Somaratne Dissanayake with a minor role. Some of his notable films include Sir Last Chance, Ethumai Methumai, Hero Nero and 64 Mayam. In 2016, Pathirage replaced Vijaya Nandasiri after his demise in the play Aluth Horek One. The first show featuring Pathirage was staged at 3.30 pm and 6.45 pm on September 2 at New Town Hall, Colombo.

=== Notable theater works ===
- Ahinsaka Prayoge
- Allai Walge
- Aluth Horek Onee
- Chaggudu Sellam
- Hadannama Be
- Heen Andare
- Kaliyuga Kolam
- Korale Mahaththaya
- Paarajika
- Raigamayai Gampalayai
- Raja Sabawa
- Sakra Bhavana

=== Notable television works ===
- Bhootha Wasthuwa
- Depethi Dahara
- Diyathaka Senehasa
- Gem
- Hathara Waram
- Kande Handiya
- Korale Mahaththaya
- Night Learners
- Paan Batta
- Raja Sabhawa
- Sakala Guru
- Sakala Guru 2
- Sina Sagaraya
- Somibara Jaramara
- Synthetic Sihina
- Tikiri and Ungi

== Filmography ==
Key
†	Denotes films that have not yet been released

Year	Film	Role	Ref.
2000	Saroja		
2006	Sonduru Wasanthe	Amadoru	
2009	Sir Last Chance	Detective	
2010	Hadawatha Mal Yayai		
2010	Thank You Berty	SMS Reality show promoter	
2011	Ethumai Methumai	Tyson	
2012	Kusa Pabha	Royal Servant	
2013	It's a Matter of Love		
2014	Rassa Kale		
2015	None Mage Sudu None	Sando	
2016	Hero Nero	Minister Lionel	
2016	64 Mayam	Silva	
2017	Ran Sayura	Robert	
2017	Punchi Apith Baya Na Dan	Columbus	
2019	Suba Theraniyo	Dheeraka	
2019	Sikuru Yogaya	Tuition master	
2019	Reload	Music teacher	
2023	Guththila	Sunaparatha	
2024	Jobless Douglas	Kochchi Kade Champa	
TBA	Adda Lanuwa Damma Kodiya †		
TBA	Amuda Raja †		
TBA	O.I.C Gadafi †		
