= Jobless Douglas =

Jobless Douglas ජොබ්ලස් ඩග්ලස්
- Promotional poster
- Directed by: Senaka Navaratne
- Written by: Senaka Navaratne
- Produced by: Chandra Kumari Navaratne
- Starring: Rodney Warnakula; Mahinda Pathirage; Dilshani Perera; Nandana Hettiarachi
- Cinematography: Lalith S. Thomas
- Edited by: Anura Bandara
- Music by: Dilum Thejasa
- Production company: Sarasavi Studio
- Release date: 7 June 2024
- Country: Sri Lanka
- Language: Sinhala

Jobless Douglas (Sinhala: ජොබ්ලස් ඩග්ලස්) a 2024 Sri Lankan Sinhala comedy film directed by Senaka Navaratne and produced by Chandra Kumari Navaratne. It stars Rodney Warnakula in the titular role along with Mahinda Pathirage, Dilshani Perera, Nandana Hettiarachi and Don Guy in supportive roles. Popular television comedian Shiran Shantha also made his debut cinema acting with the film.

== Cast ==
- Rodney Warnakula as Douglas aka Kotahene Duggy
- Mahinda Pathirage as Kochchi Kade Champa
- Dilshani Perera as Veronica
- Nandana Hettiarachi as Ran Banda
- Don Guy as Wadakapushpa
- Jeevan Handunnetti
- Asanga Perera
- Anura Srinath
- Shiran Shantha as Vasudeva
- Helen Reynolds
- Lakmini Karunarachchi
- Thushara Jayasuriya
- Tharaka Adhikari
- Nuwandika Rodrigu
- Palitha Hemapala
- Dylan Priyantha
- Ravindra Kumara
- Jageetha Dissanayake
- Chamara Virat
- Mevan Madhusankha
- Lalitha Charuka
- Buddhika Jayawardena

== Production ==
This is the first cinematic direction by Senaka Navaratne, who worked many years in Sri Lankan cinema as an editor (Hulawali, Madusamaya) and an art director. In the film, he also wrote the screenplay and lyrics. The film is produced by Chandra Kumari Navaratne and assistant director is Sasika Ruwan Marasinghe. Cinematography done by Lalith S. Thomas, editing by Anura Bandara and art direction by Priyantha Dasanayake with the assistance of Sithum Prasanna and Hirantha Chamikara. Tharaka Adhikari made the costumes with the assistance of Malinda Mudalige, Ananda Bandara with digital color combination whereas sound designed by Sasika Ruwan Marasinghe and still photography by Mahesh Nishantha. Production Coordination handled by Hemapriya Kandambi. Camera support was given by Harshana Harshana Karunathilake, Sandaruwan Jayalath, Gayatra Sandaruwan Jayalath, Anuruddha, Kashika Jayalath, Asanka Jayawickrama and Doreen Almeida. Music director is Dilum Thejasa, where Dr. Bentley Silva and Gayatri Rajapaksa made background vocals.
