= Rangana Premaratne =

Sri Lankan actor (born 1959)

Rangana Premarathne
- රංගන ප්‍රේමරත්න
- Born: 12 January 1959 (age 67); Kurunegala, Sri Lanka
- Other names: Rangana Premaratna; Rangana Premaratne
- Education: Maliyadeva College; Thurstan College
- Occupation: Actor
- Years active: 1982–present
- Known for: Manokaya
- Spouse: Vinolee Premarathne
- Children: 4
- Awards: Best Actor

Rangana Premarathne (Sinhala: රංගන ප්‍රේමරත්න; born 12 January 1959) is an actor in Sri Lankan cinema, theatre, and television. Premarathne has appeared in over 100 films and teledramas, earning numerous accolades, and is well known for his strong character and vigorous voice.

== Career ==
Rangana began his career as a stage drama actor in the early 1980s acting in the famous stage-drama Sajan Nallathambi, one of the first financially successful Sri Lankan plays. Its popularity spread to the Middle East and Sinhala audiences.

Rangana then stepped into teledrama acting in the teledrama Gamana in 1987. He first appeared in cinema in the blockbuster film Gini Avi Saha Gini Keli. He became a significant icon in the country's teledrama industry. His award-winning performance in the famous teledrama Manokaya in 1998 stands out on top of the major hits in the country's teledrama industry. In 1995, he acted in the serial Isurugira, which later represented Sri Lanka in the Golden Crest International Television Festival in Bulgaria (1995). In 1998, he won the award for Best Actor for his role in the popular television serial Manokaya.

In 2001, Rangana began work as a producer with the popular teledrama Randunu, in which he also played the main role of a politician. The duo together produced six teledramas (2001–2007) which include award-winning dramas like Punchi Rala and Ruwata Ruwa. In 2002, he made triple roles in the serial Ruwata Ruwa, the first time in the Sri Lankan teledrama industry. He was later nominated at Sumathi Awards for the Best Actor as well. Again in 2017, he made the performance of another triple role (Panduka, Hapan, Bhee) in the science fiction television series Lokantharayo.

=== Selected television serials ===
- Alu (2019)
- Anantha (2016)
- Awasan Inima (2018)
- Ayomi (2021)
- Bol Vi Ahuru (2007)
- Bopath Ella (2001)
- Dadayam Bambaru (2019)
- Damini (2001)
- Ekagei Kurullo (1996)
- Ekata Gatuma (1999)
- Gamana (1987)
- Hiru Thaniwela (2013)
- Humalaya (1992)
- Isurugira (1995)
- Kadumuna (1999)
- Kalu Hansayo (1995)
- Kinihiraka Pipi Mal (1999)
- Kutu Kutu Mama (2015)
- Lokantharayo (2017)
- Madu Nam Eya (2006)
- Maha Viru Pandu (2021)
- Makara Dadayama (2006)
- Makara Vijithaya (1999)
- Manokaya (1998)
- Maya Mansala (2004)
- Maya Sihina (2015)
- Medi Sina (2016)
- Punchi Rala (2004)
- Rajiniyo (2018)
- Ran Dalambuwo (2003)
- Randunu (2001)
- Ran Mehesi (2005)
- Rathu Pichcha (2017)
- Ridee Tharaka (2009)
- Ruwata Ruwa (2002)
- Sanda Kinduru (1999)
- Sanda Numba Nam (2010)
- Sikka Team (2016)
- Sikuru Wasanthe (2012)
- Sirakari (2017)
- Tharu Paba (2003)
- Urumayaka Aragalaya (2018)
- Uththamavi (2004)
- Uthum Pathum (2016)

== Filmography ==
List of performances by Rangana Premarathne in film
Year	Title	Roles	Notes/Ref.
1998	Gini Avi Saha Gini Keli	Police officer	
1999	Surayahana Gini Gani		
2003	Sakman Maluwa		
2009	Leader	Marcus Bandaranayake	
2010	Ira Handa Yata	Major	
2013	Doni	Silva	
2017	Ran Sayura	Anton	
2024	Gini Avi Saha Gini Keli 2		
