= Suhada Koka =

2015 Sri Lankan comedy film

- theatrical release poster
- Sinhala: සුහද කොකා
- Directed by: Giriraj Kaushalya
- Written by: Giriraj Kaushalya
- Produced by: TVT Films
- Starring: Vijaya Nandasiri; Kusum Renu; Rodney Warnakula
- Cinematography: Thusitha Anuradha
- Edited by: Ravindra Guruge
- Music by: Rohana Weerasinghe; Kapila Pugalarachchi
- Release date: 22 October 2015
- Country: Sri Lanka
- Language: Sinhala
- Budget: 85 SL Lakhs

Suhada Koka (Sinhala: සුහද කොකා) is a 2015 Sri Lankan Sinhala political comedy film directed by Giriraj Kaushalya and produced by Ravindra Guruge for TVT Films. It stars Vijaya Nandasiri and Kusum Renu in lead roles along with Rodney Warnakula and Lal Kularatne. Music co-composed by Rohana Weerasinghe and Kapila Pugalarachchi. It is the 1237th Sri Lankan film in the Sinhala cinema.

== Plot ==
The film starts with a release of peoples' vote of government election, where Rajamanthri (Vijaya) lost his seat and crying with his allies. However, his secretary Sumanasiri (Rodney) revealed that the winning member has been hospitalized after hearing the shocking news of that he won the election of the seat. Rajamanthri and crew went to the hospital and finally the winning member died and Rajamanthri won the seat. After winning the seat, he started to celebrate the win, but his fellow ministers (Priyantha and Jayasiri) started to make actions against him. However, with many funny incidents, Rajamanthri pass all the battles with the help of his allies. Meanwhile, Liyana Mahaththaya (Lal), clark (Mihira) and Kalu mudalali (Giriraj) proposed an Awurudu Ulela to impress Chief minister Narendrasinghe (Sathischandra). Rajamanthri participated all the events of Awurudu Ulela and won all of them by cunning methods of his allies. Meanwhile, Rajamanthri make gossips about the other ministers and seek to attain his place in the higher cabinet minister place. With these rumors, Chief minister starts to avoid Gajasinghe (Jayasiri) and remove him from the cabinet. For the vacancy, he appointed Rajamanthri as the new cabinet member. For the ceremony, he started to dress up very majestically and when Rajamanthri make his way to the appointing ceremony. His allies also wanted to go with him, but Rajamanthri refuses it and say that "Now I'm not the ordinary Rajamanthri, I'm now a cabinet minister and I have no time to be with you all". Rajamanthri with his wife Malini (Kusum) went to the function and his five allies make sad and surprise expressions to each other.

== Cast ==
- Vijaya Nandasiri as Rajamanthri
- Kusum Renu as Malini
- Rodney Warnakula as Sumanasiri
- Saman Hemarathna as Sumudu
- Lal Kularatne as Liyana Mahaththaya
- Giriraj Kaushalya as Kalu Mudalali
- Mihira Sirithilaka as Clerk
- Sathischandra Edirisinghe as Minister Narendrasinghe
- W. Jayasiri as Minister Gajanayake
- Priyantha Seneviratne as Minister
- Damitha Abeyratne as Lady in queue
- Rathna Sumanapala as Sumudu's granny
- Damitha Saluwadana as Neighbour

== Soundtrack ==
No.	Title	Lyrics	Singer(s)	Length
1.	"Daana Sellam Ape Rajamanthri"	Giriraj Kaushalya	Rodney Warnakula, Giriraj Kaushalya, Mihira Sirithilaka, Lalith Janakantha
