= Ulath Ekai Pilath Ekai =

2016 film by Harsha Udakanda

- Sinhala: උලත් එකයි පිලත් එකයි
- Directed by: Harsha Udakanda
- Written by: Prasad Samarathunga
- Produced by: Dinith Entertainment
- Starring: Roshan Ranawana; Darshan Dharmaraj; Mihira Sirithilaka
- Cinematography: Mahesh Karunarathne
- Edited by: Thivanka Amarathunga
- Music by: Niroshan Dreamf
- Release date: 25 August 2016
- Running time: 145 minutes
- Country: Sri Lanka
- Language: Sinhala

Ulath Ekai Pilath Ekai (Sinhala: උලත් එකයි පිලත් එකයි) is a 2016 Sri Lankan Sinhala comedy action film directed by Harsha Udakanda and produced by Chaminda Ranasinghe for Dinith Entertainment. It stars Roshan Ranawana and Darshan Dharmaraj in lead roles along with Mihira Sirithilaka and Damitha Abeyratne. Music composed by Prasadth Samarathunga. It is the 1245th Sri Lankan film in the Sinhala cinema. The film introduced Rukshana Dissanayake to cinema industry.

== Plot ==
Wanathe Roshan thinks he is a village thug. He often clashes with those around him as usual. Although he is known as Roshan, most people call him Rosha. Only his family knows that Rosha is a bully, even if he sounds like a coin to the world. Rosha has a sister. Rukshanaya is the epitome of beauty. A young man comes looking for her love. He has actor fever. The name is Rajiya. Rosha does not like Rajya. Rosha is upset that he is following Rukshan. Although Rosha threatens Rajia several times, Rajia does not listen to Rosha's words. In the end, Rosha challenges Rajia. Rosha says that if she wins, she will definitely marry Rakshana. The challenge is to defeat Rosha in front of the village. Even though he is physically in front of Rosha, Rajya, who is a pimp, likes the challenge because of his love for Rukshan. However, in front of the whole village, Rajya loses to Rosha. Unable to bear the embarrassment, Rajya decides to return home by a jungle road.

That night, the underworld leader named Karapitiye Darshan stabs the village OIC to death in the middle of a rubber estate. Rajya is shocked to see the incident. In a few moments, the police arrive and take Rajiya to the police station as an eyewitness to the murder. An artist prepares to paint the image to tell the king what the killer looks like. Rajiya is the first to create the image of Karapitiya Darshan. At the same time, the image of Rosha humiliating herself in front of the village also comes to mind. Thinking that he will teach him a good lesson, Karapitiya tells the artist Rosha's appearance instead of Darshan's. Rosha's face is drawn there. Police have been chasing Rosha ever since.

== Cast ==
- Roshan Ranawana as Wanathe Roshan
- Darshan Dharmaraj as Karapitiye Darshan
- Damitha Abeyratne as Roshan's Mother
- Mihira Sirithilaka as Sergent Premachandra
- Rajitha Hiran as Rajiya
- Kamal Deshapriya as DIG
- Ramani Siriwardena as Gangu's Mother
- Rukshana Dissanayaka as Rukshana
- Dilshani Perera as Gangu
- Prasad Samarathunga as OIC
- Nethalie Nanayakkara

== Soundtrack ==
No.	Title	Lyrics	Singer(s)	Length
1.	"Mal Mal Mal Wasi Watuna"	Prasad Samaratunga	Meena Prasadini, Amila Muthugala
