= Mago Digo Dai =

2010 Sri Lankan comedy mystery film

- official film poster
- Sinhala: මගෝ ඩිගො ඩයි
- Directed by: Srilal Priyadeva
- Written by: Gamini Mendis
- Produced by: Janitha Marasinghe
- Starring: Vijaya Nandasiri; Gamini Susiriwardana; Anarkali Akarsha
- Cinematography: Yapa Wijebandara
- Edited by: Ravindra Lal; Ruwan Chamara
- Music by: Neil Warnakulasuriya
- Distributed by: EAP Theaters
- Release date: 16 April 2010
- Running time: 124 minutes
- Country: Sri Lanka
- Language: Sinhala

Mago Digo Dai (Sinhala: මගෝ ඩිගො ඩය) is a 2010 Sri Lankan Sinhala comedy film directed by Srilal Priyadeva and produced by Janitha Marasinghe. It stars Vijaya Nandasiri, singer Gamini Susiriwardana and Anarkali Akarsha in lead roles along with Sanath Gunathilake and Anton Jude. Music composed by Neil Warnakulasuriya. It is the 1137th Sri Lankan film in the Sinhala cinema.

== Plot ==
The movie revolves around two detectives Perera and Ari (Vijaya and Gamini), who started to find crimes and other illegal businesses and incidents they had to take part in funny ways, in the meanwhile they search about a missing girl of a minister.

== Cast ==
- Vijaya Nandasiri as Sergeant C. K. Perera / Mago
- Gamini Susiriwardana as Constable I. O. Ari / Digo
- Sanath Gunathilake as Minister Sathyapala
- Anarkali Akarsha as Rosy
- Anton Jude as Sudu Mathathaya
- Sarath Chandrasiri as Kuhakawathe Chandare
- Teddy Vidyalankara as Digajanthu
- Sunil Hettiarachchi as Premaratne aka Adara Rathne
- Upali Keerthisena as Chinthaka Master
- Sarath Dikkumbura
- Dilshani Perera as Kareena
- Saman Almeida as Pieris
- Eardley Wedamuni as Wuijesinghe
- Ronnie Leitch as Dhanawansa
- D.B. Gangodathenna as Mudiyanse
- Wasala Senarath as Maliith
- Shashiranga Wickramasekara as Amila
- Roshini Gamage as Champa
- The Dog Sheeba as Dai

== Music ==
No.	Title	Singer(s)	Length
1.	"Desa Mane Mal Athirille"	Gracian Ananda, Uresha Ravihari
2.	"Anun Dipu Lanuwa Kala"	Neil Warnakulasuriya, Gamini Susiriwadena
