= Sanda Yahanata =

Sanda Yahanata සඳ යහනට
- Directed by: Mohan Niyaz
- Written by: Mohan Niyaz
- Produced by: Anil Jayasooriya
- Starring: Sabeetha Perera; Sanath Gunathilake; Cletus Mendis
- Cinematography: Lal Wickremaarachchi
- Edited by: M. S. Aliman
- Music by: Sarath Wickrema
- Distributed by: CEL Theatres
- Release date: 3 November 2000
- Running time: 117 minutes
- Country: Sri Lanka
- Language: Sinhala

Sanda Yahanata (Sinhala: සඳ යහනට) is a 2000 Sri Lankan Sinhala adult drama film directed by Mohan Niyaz and produced by Anil Jayasooriya. It stars Sabeetha Perera and Sanath Gunathilake in lead roles along with Cletus Mendis and Palitha Silva. The film marked the debut cinema appearance of Paboda Sandeepani. Music composed by Sarath Wickrema. It is the 942nd Sri Lankan film in the Sinhala cinema.

The film has been shot entirely around Kandy.

== Plot ==
Viveka is the Grama Sevaka of the village and is the eldest in a family of four girls. Jagath Hathurusinghe supports a politician in the area and he is interested in Viveka. But she resists his advances due to many reasons including differences in political ideology. She also personally dislikes him. But the reason for the girl's opposition to his entreaties are not understood.

The politician supported by Jagath. Jagath now basking in the rights of political power continues with his idea to even compel Viveka by force to agree to his proposal. Viveka has no power to fight against male dominance and political power of this society and all personal animosity against Jagath becomes ineffective. Her dreams to enter into a happy wedded life with the man she likes ends on her wedding day with the most pathetic experience in her life.

Would educated and headstrong Viveka be able to win her fight against male opposition and the political rivals. While the story continues the film ends in a tragedy.

== Cast ==
- Sabeetha Perera as Viveka
- Sanath Gunathilake as Jagath Hathurusinghe
- Palitha Silva
- Cletus Mendis as Politician
- Roshan Pilapitiya
- Mahendra Perera
- Senaka Wijesinghe
- Paboda Sandeepani as Viveka's sister
- G. R. Perera as Farmer
- Geetha Kanthi Jayakody
- Lionel Wickrama
- Seetha Kumari
- Pradeep Hettiarachchi
- Sandun Wijesiri
- Eardley Wedamuni
- Sunil Premakumara
