= Sikuru Yogaya =

- Sinhala: සිකුරු යෝගය
- Directed by: Bermin Laili Fernando
- Written by: Bermin Laili Fernando; Somapala Leelananda; Harshana Wickramsinghe
- Produced by: Dave Films
- Starring: Vijaya Nandasiri; Tennyson Cooray; Anarkali Akarsha
- Cinematography: Donald Karunaratne
- Edited by: Anura Bandara
- Music by: Navaratne Gamage; Priyanath Rathnayake; Ravihans Watakepotha
- Release date: 21 June 2019
- Country: Sri Lanka
- Language: Sinhala

Sikuru Yogaya (Sinhala: සිකුරු යෝගය) is a 2019 Sri Lankan Sinhala comedy film directed by Bermin Laili Fernando and co-produced by director himself with Vasath Chandrasiri Gamlath, Mark Antony Fernando and Daminda Dias for Dave Films Productions. It stars late Vijaya Nandasiri with Anarkali Akarsha in lead roles along with Tennyson Cooray and Rodney Warnakula. Theme music composed by veteran musician Navaratne Gamage, and background musical score by Priyanath Rathnayake and Ravihans Watakepotha. It is the 1334th Sri Lankan film in the Sinhala cinema. The film has inspired by the comedy sitcom Bodima. This is the last acting of both Vijaya and Anarkali.

== Cast ==
- Vijaya Nandasiri as Master
- Anarkali Akarsha as Hiruni
- Tennyson Cooray as Koha
- Rodney Warnakula as Piyadasa
- Anusha Damayanthi as Anusha
- Mahinda Pathirage as Tuition master
- Amila Karunanayake as Geeth
- Premadasa Vithanage
- Daya Alwis as Weda mahaththaya
- Bandula Wijeweera as Vijay
- Gamini Ambalangoda as Hettiarachchi
- Menaka Maduwanthi as Tharuki
- Jeevan Handunetti
- Kumuduni Adikari as Kumuduni, Master's wife
- Nipuni Wilson
- Sanet Dikkumbura as Wilson

== Soundtrack ==
The film consists with two original songs as well as many old time hits.

No.	Title	Lyrics	Length
1.	"Raja Isuru Sepa Labenna"	Nilar N. Kazim
2.	"Threewheel song"	Nilar N. Kazim
