= K. A. W. Perera =

Sri Lankan filmmaker (1926-2006)

K.A.W. Perera කේ. ඒ. ඩබ්. පෙරේරා
- Born: Koddul Arachchige Wilson Perera; April 15, 1926; Colombo, Sri Lanka
- Died: August 20, 2006 (aged 80); Colombo
- Education: Ananda College
- Occupations: Director, Producer, Screenplay writer
- Years active: 1955–2004
- Spouse: Agnes Perera
- Children: 3
- Parents: Wilmot Perera (father); Nansina Perera (mother)

Kala Suri Koddul Arachchige Wilson Perera (born 15 April 1926 – died 20 August 2006 as කොන්දුල් ආරච්චිගේ විල්සන් පෙරේරා) [Sinhala]), popularly known as K.A.W. Perera, was a director in Sri Lankan cinema. Considered as the pioneer of Sri Lankan public cinema, Perera was also a screenwriter, dialogue writer, lyricist and producer who contributed to Sri Lankan drama career for more than five decades.

He died on 20 August 2006 at the age of 80.

== Personal life ==
K.A.W. Perera was born on 26 April 1926 in Havelock, Colombo. His father was Wilmot Perera and his mother was Vidanagamage Kavinihami Ratnayakege Nansina Perera. He first attended to Olcott College and passed English senior exam. He received his primary education at Boys Industrial Home School, Wellawatte and his secondary education at Ananda College, Colombo. Her mother was very strict on education, hence Perera studied well at the school and passed Junior School Certificate.

He was married to longtime partner Mihindukulasuriya Warnapeliyage Theresa Agnes Perera, who was a nurse. The couple has three children – Nayanananda Chandra Kumara, Jayantha Das Perera and Tamara Chandramali Perera.

== Career ==
=== Early career ===
He started his career as an English Assistant Teacher at Biyanwila Government School. He also worked as a copywriter for Lanka Radio and as a program and feature designer, producer and children's program editor. Some of his popular radio dramas are Radio Theater and the detective drama Inspector Perera. met Agnes, his future wife during studies at a private institute to prepare University Entrance Examination. At that time, with arising financial problems, he continuously went Employment Exchange to find a job. After some days, he was hired as a clerk at the Education Department. While at the department, he wrote scripts for Radio Ceylon such as Jeewitha Sahathikaya and Rahas Parikshakaya produced by late Thevis Guruge and became popular. Praised by his Director of the Department, Perera was soon appointed as the Assistant English Teacher at a school in Biyanwala in 1949. In 1955, after few years of duty, he quit from the job and moved to Radio Ceylon as a full time writer and copywriter. He also produced radio programmes such as Handa Mama, Radio Sangarawa and Sinhala Geetha Dhara.

=== Cinema career ===
During his work at Radio Ceylon, Perera met renowned filmmaker Lester James Peries. Lester selected KAW as the dialogues writer for Sri Lanka’s first pure Sinhala film, Rekava. KAW also worked with Lester for the next film Sandesaya as dialogues writer. In 1960, he co-directed his debut film Pirimiyek Nisa along with T. Somasekaran. The film was produced by E. A. P. Edirisinghe. In 1963, he co-produced the film Suhada Sohoyuro with Edirisinghe. In 1966 he directed the film Sanasuma Kothanada and won the Sarasaviya award for the best film. He met his best friend Premalal Edirisinghe at Radio Ceylon during the production of Sandeshaya.

Since his debut, KAW made blockbuster milestones in Sinhala cinema history which includes Kapatikama, Bicycle Hora, Penawa Neda, Kathuru Muwath, Janaka Saha Manju, Lokuma Hinawa, Ihatha Athmaya, Aparadaya saha Danduwama, Lasanda and Undaya. Perera involved to introduce many talented faces to Sinhala cinema, whom became some major stars in coming ages. He introduced Geetha Kumarasinghe to silver screen through his film Wasana. Then he introduced Vijaya Nandasiri to cinema with Nedeyo. He introduced maestro Premasiri Khemadasa to cinema with Sanasuma Kothanada as well as lyricist Dharmasiri Gamage. With his final film Sumedha, renowned musician Rookantha Gunathilake has introduced into Sinhala cinema as musical director.

In 1956, he was honored at Taskkent’ International Film festival for the film Lasanda. In 1976, Perera won the award for the best director at OCIC film festival in Rome for Lasanda. In 1964, he wrote the screenplay and dialogues for the film Saravita, which was directed by Tissa Liyanasuriya. Later he received the award for Best Screenplay at the 1965 Sarasaviya Awards for this film. Among the popular programs that were started and produced by KAW during radio ceylon were Handa Mama for children, Radio Sagarawa for teenagers and Wasanawa Udawa for adult intelligence development. In 1966, he was censored from the radio, because it is strictly forbidden to engage in any activity related to the art of cinema during or outside the office hours of the radio. Therefore KAW and Karunaratne Abeysekera quit their permanent jobs and devoted themselves full time to cinema.

In 1972, he was a pioneer for the creation of the Sri Lanka film corporation.

== Legacy ==
On 19 November 2013, a felicitation ceremony and three-day film festival was held at BMICH to celebrate Perera's contribution to Sinhala cinema.

== Filmography ==
Year	Film	Roles	Ref.
1956	Rekava	Dialogue Writer	
1959	Sri 296	Dialogue Writer	
1960	Sandesaya	Dialogue Writer	
1960	Pirimiyek Nisa	Director, Dialogue Writer, Screenwriter	
1962	Ranmuthu Duwa	Dialogue Writer	
1963	Suhada Sohoyuro	Director, Dialogue Writer, Lyricist	
1966	Senasuma Kothanada	Director, screenwriter	
1966	Kapatikama	Director, screenwriter	
1964	Heta Pramada Wadi	Dialogue Writer	
1964	Getawarayo	Screenwriter	
1965	Yata Giya Dawasa	Dialogue Writer	
1965	Saaravita	Screenwriter	
1966	Sigiri Kashyapa	Dialogue Writer	
1966	Oba Dutu Da	Screenwriter	
1967	Okkoma Hari	Screenwriter	
1968	Bicycle Hora	Director, screenwriter	
1970	Penawa Neda	Screenwriter	
1971	Kathuru Muwath	Director, screenwriter	
1971	Seeye Nottuwa	Director, screenwriter	
1972	Lokuma Hinawa	Director, screenwriter	
1972	Ihatha Athmaya	Director	
1973	Aparadaya Saha Danduwama	Director	
1974	Duleeka	Director	
1974	Lasanda	Director, screenwriter	
1976	Wasana	Director, screenwriter	
1976	Nadayo	Director, screenwriter	
1978	Janaka Saha Manju	Director, screenwriter, producer	
1978	Sasara	Director, screenwriter	
1979	Hingana Kolla	Director, screenwriter	
1980	Adara Rathne	Director	
1981	Bangali Walalu	Director, screenwriter	
1982	Wathura Karaththaya	Director, screenwriter, Lyricist	
1982	Rail Paara	Director	
1988	Durga	Director, screenwriter, producer	
1994	Dhawala Pushpaya	Director, Lyricist	
1996	Madhuri	Director, screenwriter	
2000	Undaya	Director, screenwriter, producer	
2004	Sumedha	Director, screenwriter	
