= Rajya Sevaya Pinisai =

Rajya Sevaya Pinisai රාජ්‍ය සේවය පිණිසයි
- DVD poster
- Directed by: Udayakantha Warnasuriya
- Written by: Udayakantha Warnasuriya
- Based on: True incidents
- Produced by: Ureka Films
- Starring: Sanath Gunathilake; Geetha Kumarasinghe; Joe Abeywickrama; Kanchana Mendis
- Cinematography: K. D. Dayananda
- Edited by: Stanley de Alwis
- Music by: Dilup Gabadamudalige
- Production company: Dil Films International
- Distributed by: EAP Theaters
- Release date: 11 August 2000
- Country: Sri Lanka
- Language: Sinhala

Rajya Sevaya Pinisai (On State Service) (Sinhala: රාජ්‍ය සේවය පිණිසයි) is a 2000 Sri Lankan Sinhala drama thriller film directed by Udayakantha Warnasuriya and produced by Ranjith Jayasuriya for Ureka Films. It stars Sanath Gunathilake and Geetha Kumarasinghe in lead roles along with Joe Abeywickrama and Kanchana Mendis. Music composed by Dilup Gabadamudalige.

The story is based on some true to life incidents that happened in Sri Lanka during 1987–1989 JVP insurrection.

== Cast ==
- Sanath Gunathilake as Minister Janaka Situbandara
- Geetha Kumarasinghe as Mahesha Upamali
- Joe Abeywickrama as Sumanasekara
- Kanchana Mendis as Prabhashwari
- Linton Semage as Wijepala
- Nimal Antony as Nihal
- Salaman Fonseka as Minister Welgama
- Nalin Pradeep Udawela as Janaka's henchman
- Priyankara Rathnayake as Janaka's shooter
- Jagath Benaragama as Dragged away shooter
- Sarath Chandrasiri as Purple shirt shooter
- Raja Sumanapala as Shot shopowner
- Gunawardena Hettiarachchi as Doctor
- Buddhi Wickrama

== Awards ==
Award Festival	Year	Category	Recipient(s)	Result
Sarasaviya Awards	2001	Best Actress	Geetha Kumarasinghe	Won
National Film Festival	2001	Best Actress	Geetha Kumarasinghe	Won
Presidential Film Festival	2001	Best Supporting Actress	Kanchana Mendis	Won
Presidential Film Festival	2001	Best Female Vocalist	Nirosha Virajini	Won
