= 64 Mayam =

64 Mayam 64 මායම්
- official poster
- Directed by: Sudesh Wasantha Peiris
- Written by: Sudesh Wasantha Peiris
- Produced by: Sunil T. Films
- Starring: Vijaya Nandasiri; Mahinda Pathirage; Susila Kottage
- Cinematography: Gamini Moragollagama
- Edited by: Anura Bandara
- Music by: Keshan Sudantha Perera
- Distributed by: EAP Films
- Release date: 17 November 2016
- Country: Sri Lanka
- Language: Sinhala

64 Mayam (Sinhala: 64 මායම්) is a 2016 Sri Lankan Sinhalese comedy film directed by Sudesh Wasantha Peiris and produced by Sunil T. Fernando as Sunil T. Films. It stars Vijaya Nandasiri and Mahinda Pathirage in the lead roles, and Susila Kottage and Vishwa Lanka in supporting roles. The music was composed by Keshan Sudantha Perera. It is the 1264th Sri Lankan film in Sinhalese cinema. The film achieved blockbuster status after being screened for more than 150 days. The film was released after the death of the lead actor Vijaya Nandasiri. It is a coincidence that "64 Mayam" is the 64th film by Sunil T. Films. It is a remake of the 1976 comedy film Lokuma Hinawa.

== Plot ==
Soysa (Vijaya) and Silva (Mahinda) are two jobless men doing various businesses that end up without success. They meet Piyum (Richard) who invite them to a party. Both Soysa and Silva get stomach aches because of some food they eat at the party. They get admitted in a hospital. Meanwhile, a man is arrested because he has stolen a gem and is believed to have swallowed it. One night at the hospital when he was sleeping he saw his wife in a dream. The thief told his wife who he saw in the dream that he hid the gem in a small statue of a maiden in the pot the maiden is carrying. The statue is for sale in his shop in Kithulpitiya. Soysa, Silva and another man Ryan hears this as they were also sleeping near the thief. So three of them escape from the hospital. The hospital staff is fooled by Soysa who disguised himself as a doctor and Ryan disguised himself as a nurse. Soysa does not know that the other two had escaped like this. He wants to take the gem himself. He does not tell this to others in the hospital. Ryan and Silva feels the same and they also do the same.

There is a sub-plot where two family planning agents visit Soysa's house and they end up the conversation, arguing with him. Meanwhile, Ryan goes in search of the shop in Kithulpitiya. He stops a lady, Niluka who lives in Kithulpitiya who refuses to tell him that he is in Kithulpitiya at the moment because she got angry with his behaviour. On her way she visits the shop and gets fond of the statue so she takes it. After some time, Ryan visits the shop and after assuring that it is the only shop in the village which sells statues, he describes the appearance of the statue to the thief's wife who is in the shop. He gets to know that the statue was taken away by the woman he stopped on the road. At that moment, Soysa also visits the shop and gets to know about what happened there.

Ryan goes to Niluka's place and they both gets fond of each other. Meanwhile, Soysa also goes there and has a conversation, lying to Niluka that the statue is a cursed one. He meets Silva when he comes outside and both of them agree to work together to take the gem. Silva also tells to Niluka, her father and brother that the statue will prevent Niluka from getting married. Afterwards Soysa, Ryan and Silva quarrel to take the gem. The statue is broken in the quarrel but they do not find any gem in the pot. However Niluka's brother also searches for a girl to marry and Soysa proposes his elder daughter to him. His wife Samanalee confesses that Soysa ran after the gem to get his two daughters' marriages done. Niluka's brother agrees to hold the wedding at his expense. The film concludes that men are clever in any business like this.

== Cast ==
- Vijaya Nandasiri as Soysa
- Mahinda Pathirage as Silva
- Susila Kottage as Samanmalee
- Vishwa Lanka as Ryan
- Nirosha Thalagala as Niluka
- Vishwa Kodikara as Niluka's brother
- Harshi Padmarathna
- Sarath Chandrasiri as Hospital attendant Almeda
- Nilmini Kottegoda as Sriyalatha
- D.B. Gangodathenna
- Jeevan Handunnetti as Family planning agent
- Richard Manamudali as Piyum

== Soundtrack ==
No.	Title	Singer(s)	Length
1.	"Payala Madu Sandak"	Poorna Sachintha, Chamathka Peiris
2.	"Jara Jara Bara Karaththa"	Lanthra Perera
3.	"Komalawathi"	Mahinda Pathirage, Richerd Manamudali
4.	"Ran Masuran Kiri"	H. R. Jothipala, Anjeline Gunathilake
5.	"Diwa Ra Dekehi"	H. R. Jothipala, Anjeline Gunathilake
