= None Mage Sudu None =

- official film poster
- Sinhala: නෝනේ මගේ සුදු නෝනේ
- Directed by: Eranga Senarathna
- Written by: Eranga Senarathna
- Produced by: Sri Jaya Cineroo
- Starring: Wilson Gunaratne; Anusha Damayanthi; Mahinda Pathirage
- Cinematography: Danushka Nishan Fernando
- Edited by: Randika Nadeeshan Wijemanna
- Music by: Lassana Jayasekara
- Distributed by: CEL Theatres
- Release date: 17 July 2015
- Country: Sri Lanka
- Language: Sinhala

None Mage Sudu None (Sinhala: නෝනේ මගේ සුදු නෝනේ) is a 2015 Sri Lankan Sinhala comedy film directed by Eranga Senarathna and produced by D.D.R.D.S Samarasekara for Sri Jaya Cineroo. It stars Wilson Gunaratne and Anusha Damayanthi in lead roles along with Mahinda Pathirage and Mihira Sirithilaka. Music composed by Lasantha Jayasekara. It is the 1230th Sri Lankan film in the Sinhala cinema.

== Cast ==
- Wilson Gunaratne as Hector
- Anusha Damayanthi as Pabalu
- Mihira Sirithilaka as Manju
- Mahinda Pathirage as Sando
- Sanjula Diwarathne as Anju
- Sanju Rodrigo as Lasanda
- Manel Chandralatha as Prophecy telling lady
- Dayasiri Hettiarachchi as Fransic matchmaker

== Soundtrack ==
No.	Title	Singer(s)	Length
1.	"Kadadasi Sarungal"	Shane Egodawatta Ft Gamini Susiriwardana
2.	"Kauda Oba Kaurundo"	Uwindu Ravishan
3.	"Sexy Roope Mage"	Gamini Susiriwardana, Mala Bharathi
