= Lal Kularatne =

Sri Lankan actor (born 1949)

- ලාල් කුලරත්න
- Born: Mahathanthilage Lal Kularatne; May 5, 1949 (age 77); Sri Lanka
- Education: Vidyarathna College, Horana
- Occupations: Actor, Dramatist
- Years active: 1949–present
- Spouse: Sriyani Perera
- Children: 4
- Relatives: Vijaya Nandasiri (cousin); Devika Mihirani (cousin)
- Awards: Best Supporting Actor

Mahathanthilage Lal Kularatne (born May 5, 1949 as ලාල් කුලරත්න) [Sinhala]), popularly known as Lal Kularatne, is an actor in Sri Lankan cinema, stage drama and television. Kularatne is best known for the role Liyana Mahaththaya in Ethuma teledrama and role Adiriyan in Batti teledrama.

== Personal life ==
He completed his education from Vidyarathna University College, Horana. He passed A/L examination through commerce stream and was able to enter the university. She is married to Sriyani Perera, who is the elder sister of popular actress Devika Mihirani. Devika is married to popular artist, late Vijaya Nandasiri. He was a teacher by profession until fired due to lengthy vacation took for a stage drama showed in abroad in 2004. The couple has two sons - Awantha, Hirantha, and two daughters - Arundathi, Sanduni.

== Acting career ==
At the school, his teacher was popular veteran artist Hemasiri Liyanage. Kularatne started acting under his guidance along with his classmates such as Dharmasiri Bandaranayake and Douglas Siriwardena. His maiden stage drama appearance came through Rathu Hattakari directed by Lucien Bulathsinhala. Then he acted in Nariya Saha Keju, where he met his future wife.

His television drama career started with Sirisa Kothalawala's Mora Giri Gamana. His most popular television acting came through comedy roles in Batti and Ethuma. According to critics, his best teledrama acting came through Sasara Sakman, which is still did not televised.

=== Selected stage dramas ===
- Rathu Hattakari
- Thalamala Pipila
- Nariya Saha Keju
- Guru Tharuwa
- Socrates

=== Selected television serials ===
- Batti as Adiriyan
- Bhavana - Akala Rathriya
- Doratu Rakinno
- Eheth Ehemai
- Ethuma 1, 2 as Liyana Mahaththaya
- Girikula
- Husma Saha Oxygen
- Jeewithaya Athi Thura
- Katu Imbula
- Kolamba Italiya
- Ilandariyo
- Mathi Nethi Daa
- Medi Sina
- Mehew Rate
- Mora Giri Gamana
- Naana Kamare
- Nagenahira Weralin Asena
- Nethu
- Nil Ahasa Oba
- Nisala Vila
- Palingu Piyapath
- Paththara Gedara
- Rahai Jeewithe
- Sansararanya Asabada
- Theertha Tharanaya
- Thunpath Ratawaka Lassana
- Tikiri and Ungi

== Beyond acting ==
He is a member of Sri Lanka Freedom Party political party. On 20 July 2016, he was summoned to appear before Presidential Commission of Inquiry in order to record a statement pertaining to an investigation over allegedly obtaining vehicles on lease belongs to State Engineering Corporation.

== Filmography ==
Kularatne started his film career with Paradeesaya back in 1991, directed by Linton Semage with a minor role. His most popular cinema acting came through films Walapatala, Suhada Koka and Sikuru Hathe.

Key
†	Denotes films that have not yet been released

Year	Film	Role	Ref.
1991	Paradeesaya		
1998	Gini Avi Saha Gini Keli	Padmey's associate	
1998	Anthima Reya		
1999	Padadaya		
2001	Kinihiriya Mal	Kavi Mudalali	
2003	Sudu Kaluwara	Heen Manike's father	
2007	Sikuru Hathe		
2008	Walapatala	Sergeant Banda	
2010	Uththara		
2015	Suhada Koka	Liyana Mahaththaya	
2019	President Super Star	Reporter	
2024	Sihina Nelum Mal	Lal	
2025	Mr. Missis		

== Awards ==
He has won many awards at many local film and television award festivals. He won the award for the Best Supporting Actor in State Drama Festival for the role in Thalamala Pipila. He was under the custody for some political disputes at that moment, where his wife took the award in the festival.

=== State Drama Festival Awards ===
Year	Nominee / work	Award	Result
	Thalamala Pipila	Best supporting actor	Won

=== Unda Awards ===
Year	Nominee / work	Award	Result
	Nagenahira Weralin	Best supporting actor	Won

=== Sarasaviya Awards ===
Year	Nominee / work	Award	Result
2015	Suhada Koka	Merit Award	Won

=== Sumathi Awards ===
Year	Nominee / work	Award	Result
2016	Theertha Tharanaya	Merit Award	Won
