= Sakala Guru =

Sri Lankan comedy thriller television serial by Tikiri Rathnayake

- සකල ගුරු
- Genre: Comedy; Mystery
- Created by: Chinthaka Peiris
- Developed by: Cine Lanka Creations
- Screenplay by: Chinthaka Peiris
- Directed by: Tikiri Ratnayake
- Starring: Giriraj Kaushalya; Mihira Sirithilaka; Chinthaka Peiris; Chamila Peiris; Dilhani Weerasinghe
- Voices of: Bandula Wijeweera
- Theme music composer: Bandara Eheliyagoda
- Opening theme: Shakra Brahma Isuru Devindu
- Composer: Navaratne Gamage
- Country of origin: Sri Lanka
- Original language: Sinhala
- No. of seasons: 2
- No. of episodes: 302

Production
- Executive producers: Sama Rathnayake; Siddharth Abeywardena
- Production location: Mawathagama
- Cinematography: Chandana Dharmapriya
- Editor: Manjula Malwatte
- Running time: 17 to 20 minutes

Original release
- Network: Sri Lanka Rupavahini Corporation
- Release: 24 August 2019 – 7 December 2021

Related
- Sakala Guru 2

Sakala Guru (Sinhala: සකල ගුරු) is a 2019 Sri Lankan comedy mystery teledrama broadcast on Jathika Rupavahini. The series is directed by Tikiri Ratnayake, produced by Sama Rathnayake for season one and Siddharth Abeywardena for season two. The serial is written by Chinthaka Peiris. The first season was first aired in August 2019 every weekday from Monday to Thursday at 7.30 pm. The season one ended on 1 January 2018 after 202 episodes. The teledrama is being shot in Pussella We-Uda village, Mawathagama in Kurunegala.

In season 1, it stars Giriraj Kaushalya, Mihira Sirithilaka and Chinthaka Peiris in lead roles along with Dilhani Weerasinghe, Chamila Peiris and Susila Kottage in supportive roles. The show becomes a popular serial, where the crew had to make the second season as well.

Second season titled Sakala Guru 2 was started on 5 May 2021. The previous cast reprised their roles from the first season. The series ended after 100 episodes, when the lead actor Giriraj Kaushalya had fallen ill.

== Seasons ==
Season	Episodes	Originally aired	
Season	Episodes	First aired	Last aired
1	202	24 August 2019	16 December 2020
2	100	5 May 2021	7 December 2021

== Cast and characters ==
=== Main ===
- Giriraj Kaushalya as Pinsiri Podi Bandara a.k.a. Podde Gurunnanse
- Mihira Sirithilaka as Bhoothaya
- Chinthaka Peiris as Sumane
- Chamila Peiris as Siriyalatha, wife of Podde Gurunnanse
- Dilhani Weerasinghe as Pushpa

=== Supportive cast ===
- Kavindya Dulshani as Nelum (retired)
- Taniya Perera as Nelum (current)
- Susila Kottage as Maggy Hami
- Nethalie Nanayakkara as Nona Hami
- Ananda Athukorala as Chandrasiri, Grama Sevaka
- Hansamala Janaki as Kanthi, Grama Sevaka's wife
- Mahinda Pathirage as Kalu Mudalali
- Udaya Kumari as Hamine, Mudalali's wife
- Imeshan Nelligahawatte as Mayura
- Harshi Anjumala as Roshini
- Aloka Dhananjani as Kokila
- Deepani Silva as Hichchi Amma

=== Minor cast ===
- Hasarinda Kesara as Amila
- Suneth Shanthapriya as Kumara
- Milinda Perera as Loku Hamuduruwo
- Shashi Angelina as Bhoothi
- Saman Gunawardena as Minister Wanninayake
- Indika Prabath as Kapila
- Anula Wanigasuriya
- Nimesha de Silva as Anoma
- Sampath Bandihetti as Berty, Amila's father and thug
- Jagath Jayawardena
- Daya Wayaman as Ruk Deviya
- Hemantha Iriyagama as Councillor Ambepussa
- Sheshan Manawadu
- Shahini Roshana
- Sanju Kaushalya
- Kandula Seneviratne
- Ayesha Abeyratne
- Anushka Bandara Ketakumbura
- Priyantha Ranasinghe
- Mahesh Jayaweera
- Sujatha Halahakoon
- Chandrani Kulauthum
- Sunethra Abeykoon
- Gamini Chandrasiri
- Lal Hapuarachchi
- Vipulantha Hettiarachchi
- Ananda Manatungarachchi
- Chathura Pramod Rathnayake

== Critical response ==
Initially, the teledrama crew had decided to terminate the serial after two hundred episodes. But due to the large response from the audience, they started the second season of the serial.
