= Wasana =

Wasana (වාසනා)
- Directed by: K.A.W. Perera
- Produced by: G.V.J.Wickramasinghe; H.K.Dharmadasa; W.H.Sumathipala
- Starring: Vijaya Kumaranatunga; Malini Fonseka; Nita Fernando; Joe Abeywickrama; Geetha Kumarasinghe
- Cinematography: M. H. Gafoor
- Edited by: M. P. Rupasena
- Music by: Premasiri Khemadasa
- Release date: 26 March 1976
- Country: Sri Lanka
- Language: Sinhala

Wasana is a 1976 Sinhalese language romance film directed by K.A.W. Perera. The film stars Vijaya Kumaranatunga and Malini Fonseka in lead roles. Also this film was the cinema debut of popular Sri Lankan film actress Geetha Kumarasinghe.

The film follows the lives of middle-class people in Sri Lanka.

== Cast ==
- Vijaya Kumaratunga as Sudam
- Malini Fonseka as Sudarshi Rajadasa
- Joe Abeywickrama as Sudam's friend
- Nita Fernando as Sudam's sister
- Dommie Jayawardena as Newton
- Geetha Kumarasinghe as Pushpa
- Herbert Amarawickrama as CID Inspector Ronald Wickrama
- B. S. Perera as Dobie 'Sima'
- Herbie Seneviratne as Mr. Rajadasa
- Freddie Silva as Martin
- Rukmani Devi as Mrs. Rajadasa
- Lilian Edirisinghe as Nona
- Sudesh Gunaratne as Sudarshi's courter
- Pujitha Mendis as Orderly
- Wimala Kumari as Mrs. Fernando
- J. H. Stanley Perera as Tractor driver
- Seetha Kumari as Nurse
- D. Gunapala as Mudalali's man
