= Ko Mark No Mark =

2014 Sri Lankan comedy film

- Sinhala: කෝ මාක් නෝ මාක්
- Directed by: Jayaprakash Siwgurunadan
- Written by: Mihira Sirithilaka; Chinthaka Peiris
- Based on: Thilak Senasinghe
- Produced by: EAP Films
- Starring: Vijaya Nandasiri; Dilhani Ekanayake; Giriraj Kaushalya
- Cinematography: Nalaka Vithanage; Ruwan Costa
- Edited by: Ravindra Guruge
- Music by: Mahesh Denipitiya; Kapila Pugalarachehi
- Distributed by: EAP Theatres
- Release date: 12 December 2014
- Country: Sri Lanka
- Language: Sinhala

Ko Mark No Mark (Sinhala: කෝ මාක් නෝ මාක්) is a 2014 Sri Lankan Sinhala comedy film directed by Jayaprakash Siwgurunadan and produced by Soma Edirisinghe for EAP Films. It stars Vijaya Nandasiri in dual roles and Dilhani Ekanayake in lead roles along with Giriraj Kaushalya and Mihira Sirithilaka. Music co-composed by Mahesh Denipitiya and Kapila Pugalarachehi. It is the 1217th Sri Lankan film in the Sinhala cinema.

== Plot ==
The film revolves around Mark who works as an assistant to professor Amaraweera a scientist who is working on a new discovery. Mark has a tough time at home with his wife as he has not been paid his salary for several months. She often quarrels with him over this.

One day when Prof. Amaraweera refuse to pay his salary, Mark decides to commit suicide and swallows a solution in the lab prepared by the professor. Instead of death it makes him disappear physically and quite surprisingly he gets in touch with a dead revolutionary Vimukthi. The revolutionary uses Mark to achieve his mission to make a better and equal society. But Mark with Prof. Amaraweera tries to regain his original status.

== Cast ==
- Vijaya Nandasiri as Mark / Minister Meril Palutupana
- Dilhani Ekanayake as Rupika Mihirani
- Mahendra Perera as Professor Amaraweera
- Giriraj Kaushalya as Vimukthi
- Mihira Sirithilaka as Lekamthuma
- Semini Iddamalgoda as Mrs. Palatupana
- Gihan Fernando as Louvie
- Kumara Thirimadura as Mark's neighbour
- Sarath Kothalawala as PM Gangodawila
- Piyumi Boteju as Taniya
- Chinthaka Peiris as Political show host
- Ramya Wanigasekara as Rupika's mother
- Lalith Janakantha as Manager Swami
- Nuwangi Liyange as Mark's neighbor's wife
- Dimuthu Chinthaka as Mudalali

== Soundtrack ==
No.	Title	Lyrics	Singer(s)	Length
1.	"Divi Nahaganna Hithuna"	Bandula Nanayakkarawasam	Nalin Perera, Kapila Pugalaarchchi
2.	"Pakshiya"	Kelum Srimal	Sunil Perera
