= Raja Sumanapala =

Sri Lankan actor

Raja Sumanapala රාජා සුමනපාල
- Born: Navaratne Bandara Raja Sumanapala; 1936; Pelmadulla, Sri Lanka
- Died: 2003 (aged 70–71)
- Education: Gankanda Central College, Pelmadulla
- Occupations: Actor, dramatist, musician
- Years active: 1963–2003
- Spouse: Rathna Sumanapala (m. 1965)

Navaratne Bandara Raja Sumanapala (born 1936 – died 2003 as රාජා සුමනපාල) [Sinhala]), popularly known as Raja Sumanapala, was an actor in Sri Lankan cinema, stage drama and television.

== Personal life ==
Sumanapala was born in 1936 in Pelmadulla. He completed education from Gankanda Central College, Pelmadulla.

He was married to popular actress Rathna Sumanapala. The couple had two daughters and two sons.

== Acting career ==
Sumanapala worked at Pelmadulla Art Forum in the music department, where he met his future wife Rathna.

He acted in several popular television serials in the early periods. His character as "Ali James" in Kopi Kade was highly popularized.

=== Selected television serials ===
- Hathe Wasama
- Hiru Sandu Hamuwe
- Hiruta Muwawen
- Laa Hiru Dahasak
- Lokanthaya
- Wetath Niyarath
- Yashorawaya

== Filmography ==
Sumanapala started his film career with the 1977 film Pembara Madhu, directed by Sugathapala Senarath Yapa. Some of his popular cinema acting came through Mangala Thegga, Wadula, Palama Yata, Gini Avi Saha Gini Keli and his final film Parliament Jokes.

| Year | Film | Role | Ref. |
|---|---|---|---|
| 1977 | Pembara Madhu | Win doubter | |
| 1978 | Selinage Walawwa | | |
| 1980 | Jodu Walalu | | |
| 1980 | Sinhabahu | | |
| 1981 | Induta Mal Mitak | | |
| 1982 | Adhishtana | | |
| 1983 | Manik Maliga | | |
| 1984 | Wadula | Fisherman | |
| 1987 | Mangala Thegga | Eranda | |
| 1987 | Kiwulegedara Mohottala | Cave meeting onlooker | |
| 1989 | Siri Medura | Siri supporter | |
| 1990 | Palama Yata | Mudalali | |
| 1991 | Golu Muhude Kunatuwa | Pappa Mahaththaya | |
| 1993 | Chaya Maya | | |
| 1993 | Ordinary Magic | Sabish | |
| 1994 | Ambu Samiyo | | |
| 1994 | Sandamadala | Gramasevaka | |
| 1996 | Thunweni Aehe | | |
| 1997 | The Second Jungle Book: Mowgli & Baloo | Buldeo's servant | |
| 1997 | Apaye Thappara 84000k | | |
| 1998 | Gini Avi Saha Gini Keli | Guney | |
| 1998 | Aege Vairaya 3 | Larry | |
| 2000 | Rajya Sevaya Pinisai | Shot shop owner | |
| 2002 | Parliament Jokes | Guneris | |
| 2010 | Kshema Bhoomi | Mendis | |

== Awards ==
- Sumathi Merit Award at Sumathi Awards 2000 — Hathe Wasama
