= Bahubuthayo =

2002 comedy horror film by Udayakantha Warnasuriya

Bahubuthayo බහුබූතයෝ
- Directed by: Udayakantha Warnasuriya
- Written by: Udayakantha Warnasuriya
- Produced by: Fun Flower Films
- Starring: Paboda Sandeepani; Mahendra Perera; Rodney Warnakula; Vijaya Nandasiri
- Cinematography: K.D. Dayananda
- Edited by: Indika Gunathilake; Chathura Ambegoda; Chaminda Perera
- Music by: Ananda Perera
- Production company: Dil Process Lab
- Distributed by: EAP Theatres
- Release date: 8 August 2002
- Language: Sinhala

Bahubuthayo (also spelled Bahu boothayo; Sinhala: බහුබූතයෝ) is a 2002 Sinhala comedy mystery film written and directed by Udayakantha Warnasuriya, and co-produced by the director himself with Deepa Fernando for Fun Flower Films. The film features Paboda Sandeepani, Mahendra Perera and Rodney Warnakula in the leading roles while Vijaya Nandasiri, Richerd Manamudali, Srinath Maddumage, and Quintus Weerakoon in supporting roles. Music composed by Ananda Perera. The film is the prequel in 2015 Gindari film. Produced by EAP circuit cinemas, showed more than 50 theatres. It released on 8 August 2002 and was a commercial hit in Sri Lankan film history in that year, which induced the director to make its sequels. The film was shot at locations around Colombo. It is the 985th Sri Lankan film in the Sinhala cinema.

== Plot ==
Lanti and Bunty are two young journalists, who go out on an assignment to the southerns village of Kirindiwela, where according to the legends, an abode of evil spirits in ancient times, to write a feature on devil dancing and exorcist rituals for a travel publication. When a possessed women in the village aroused and follows them fiercely, they managed to flee to the jungle. Its getting dark and they see a small house. While spending their first night in this jungle home of a village exorcist Elaris Appuhami, Bunty and Lanty were pleasantly surprised to encounter a pretty young girl named Tikiri, who Elaris told Lanti and Bunty was his domestic helper. Without the permission, Bunty took a photo of Tikiri as well.

At the dinner, when Bunty asked Tikiri to come with them, Tikiri agreed, but it was just a joke by Bunty. When Lanty and Bunty set out the next morning, they suddenly found that Tikiri following them. When all their efforts to send her back home failed, the desperate young men explain their plight to the Chief Priest of the village temple, who informed them that Tikiri was in fact an evil spirit which posed off as a human being. Elaris Appuhami charmed to live with her as his helper. The shocked journalists plead with the chief priest to save them from this evil woman. The chief priest tells them that he will finish this nuisance, but after before months, come back and help to build a temple bell pole. Lanti and Bunty accepted to this and priest remove Tikiri from their path.

Bunty and Lanti return to home believing that their traumatic experience has ended. Three months end and they forget to go back to village and build the bell. The bind released Tikiri back to their home and they take every possible way to banish her, but all fails. Their housemate, Chaminda, their office friends, and a local gang also captured by Tikiri's possessed and abilities. One day, they met a god, who take the human shape fall on to land. Lanti and Bunty explained their horror experience to god and plead to remove her from their home. God, who is an alcoholic, came to see the spirit. But, due to human being shape, god thinks she is just a normal pretty girl. But, after Lanti and Bunty confirms that, she is posed off to a human being, god take a magical spectacle and observe Tikiri with the spectacle. Truth reveals that she is a devil. Magical spectacle, which was given to Lanty and Bunty has the power to visualize actual appearance of devils, god and humans as it is.

God tries to remove her with god's power, but Tikiri thrashed him and god flees. After many incidents to remove her back, Lanty and Bunty took help from spectacle to see actual god and devils. Finally, all sorts of trouble, Lanty remembers about the village temple bell. Lanty and Bunty quickly went village and meets Chief Priest. Lanty and Bunty with the help of villagers started to build the temple bell tower. After finished the work, Priest provided a bowl of holy water (Pirith pan) of Lord Buddha and said this can remove her from the home.

They came back to home and see a dance party at their home. With the help of magical spectacles, it is revealed that all at the party are devils. Holy water is mixed to water tank and they spray water towards the devils. Devils scream and run away from the home. But, all water in the tank is finished and still Tikiri is at the home. Bunty however, able to take some water to his mouth and spit into Tikiri. Tikiri screamed and run from the house, finally banishing her from the house. There is some holy water remaining at the bottle, which Lanti and Banti use to roam around the city and sprays on Devils using the magic spectacles. In the end credits, the caged bat is shown.

== Cast ==
- Paboda Sandeepani as Tikiri, the devil spirit
- Mahendra Perera as Lanti
- Rodney Warnakula as Bunty
- Richerd Manamudali as Chaminda
- Vijaya Nandasiri as Alcoholic god
- Srinath Maddumage as Sakkara Gune
- Quintus Weerakoon as Head monk
- Sarath Kulanga as one office friend
- Gamini Hettiarachchi as red shirt friend
- Anton Jude as Devil in the bus
- D.B. Gangodathenna as Interviewed villager
- Janesh Silva as Police constable
- Rajitha Hiran as Temple worker
- Senaka Perera as Elaris Gurunnanse
- Upali Keerthisena as Bar waiter
- Damitha Saluwadana as Dewala chanter
- Sarath Chandrasiri as Street devil

== Release ==
Pre-production were completed in January 2002. The film was released on 2002 in more than 25 EAP circuit cinemas and ended the theatrical shows in November 2002. The film went on to become a huge commercial success. The film easily passed commercially successful 50 and 100 days as well.

== Soundtrack ==
No.	Title	Lyrics	Singer(s)	Length
1.	"Concrete Wananthare"	Kelum Srimal	Nanda Malini
2.	"Okkoma Bahubuthayo"	Kelum Srimal	Sunil Perera, Deepal Perera
3.	"Aswaha Katawaha"	Kelum Srimal	Shanika Wanigasekara
