= Gindari =

- Directed by: Udayakantha Warnasuriya
- Written by: Udayakantha Warnasuriya
- Produced by: Udayakantha Warnasuriya
- Starring: Paboda Sandeepani; Mahendra Perera; Rodney Warnakula; Sriyantha Mendis
- Cinematography: K.D Dayananda
- Edited by: Pravin Jayaratne
- Music by: Ananda Perera
- Production company: EAP Theatres
- Release date: 24 April 2015
- Language: Sinhala
- Box office: 45 LKR Million (in 35 days)

Gindari: Bahubuthayo 2 (Sinhala: ගින්දරී - බහුබූතයෝ 2) is a 2015 Sinhalese comedy mystery film. The film served as a sequel to the 2001 film Bahubuthayo, which was written and directed and produced by Udayakantha Warnasuriya. It stars Rodney Warnakula, Mahendra Perera and Paboda Sandeepani in lead roles along with Richerd Manamudali and Sriyantha Mendis. Music composed by Ananda Perera. It is the 1225th Sri Lankan film in the Sinhala cinema.

Scenes in the film were shot in and around the towns of Anuradhapura and Colombo, Sri Lanka.

== Plot ==
Following up to events from the earlier film, Bahubuthayo, Lanti and Bunty are working as journalists. Tikiri, an evil spirit, comes looking for Lanti and Bunty. The three end up living together while Tikiri does their work.

After the publication of a misleading news item relating to a minister, the minister comes to the house where Bunty and Lanti live and beats them. The minister thinks Tikiri is beautiful, and takes her by force to work in his ministry office. He changes Tikiri's name as Tikri and falls with her. Due to parental pressure, Bunty soon marries a girl named Malkanthi. He discovers he is not well matched with his wife and they frequently quarrel until Malkanthi leaves him.

Meanwhile, Tikiri rejects advances from the minister and returns to the house where Bunty and Lanty live. From there, further problems develop as the journalists must discover what it will take to get rid of the she-devil in their home.

== Cast ==
- Paboda Sandeepani as Tikiri aka Tikri
- Mahendra Perera as Lanti
- Rodney Warnakula as Bunty
- Richerd Manamudali as Chaminda
- Sriyantha Mendis as Minister Edwin Balachandra
- Lochana Imashi as Malkanthi
- Susila Kottage as Bunty's mother
- Ariyasena Gamage as Bunty's father
- Ravindra Yasas as Secretary Ari
- Manike Attanayake as Minister's wife
- Boniface Jayasantha as Chief monk
- Anura Bandara Rajaguru as Devil master
- Rathna Sumanapala as Malkanthi's mother
- Sarath Chandrasiri as Malkanthi's drunken uncle
- Chathura Perera as Minister security guard
- Lucky Dias as himself
- Roshan Ranawana as Cameo Role
- Udari Warnakulasooriya as Cameo Role
- Bindu Bothalegama as Room boy
- Jeevan Handunetti as Pub servant
- Saman Almeida as Minister security guard
- Shiromika Fernando as Sales woman
- Damitha Saluwadana as woman at picatin

== Release ==
The film was released in April 2015. The film reached 100 days to August 2015.

== Song ==
No.	Title	Lyrics	Singer(s)	Length
1.	"Suranganavan Paradana"	Kelum Srimal	Nalin Perera, M.G Dhanushka
