= Rathna Sumanapala =

Sri Lankan actress (born 1940)

Rathna Sumanapala රත්නා සුමනපාල
- Born: Podirathna Manike Abeygunasekara; June 10, 1940 (age 85); Palmadulla, Sri Lanka
- Education: Gankanda Central College, Pelmadulla
- Occupations: Actress, Dramatist
- Years active: 1962–present
- Spouse: Raja Sumanapala (m. 1965)
- Children: 4

Podirathna Manike Abeygunasekara (born 10 June 1940 as රත්නා සුමනපාල) [Sinhala]), popularly known as Rathna Sumanapala, is an actress in Sri Lankan cinema, stage drama and television. One of the most popular television actresses in Sri Lanka with a career spanning more than five decades, Rathna is notable for her role as Kopi Kade Hamine in the television serial Kopi Kade.

== Personal life ==
She was born on 10 June 1940 in Lellopitiya, Ratnapura as the second of the family with four siblings. Rathna has one elder brother, one younger sister and one younger brother. Her father was a school principal. However, his salary was not enough for maintaining the family, where he quit from the job and became a government contractor. She started education from Ratnapura Baranduwa Junior School and then entered to Pelmadulla Central College (currently known as Gankanda Central College, Pelmadulla).

She was married to popular actor Raja Sumanapala. The couple has two daughters - Waruni, Manjula - and two sons - Prabash and Mahesh. Raja died on 2003. Grand children: Dushantha Deshan, Dulhan Tanishka, Bisandi Sumanapala, Dulan Hansaja, Dinali Shenara, Bihandu Yethmin, and Vidusha Sumanapala.

== Acting career ==
Rathna first acted at the grade 3 in the play Andare. Then she acted in school stage several times. She also performed dancing under Saral Lal. After completing Advanced Level, Rathna joined with Pelmadulla Art Forum in music department where he met future husband Raja. Raja Sumanapala along with Sugathapala Senarath Yapa contacted Rathna for a dramatic role in the 1962 stage play Pin Bath, which marked her entrance to the popular drama. After the play become highly successful, Rathna played in every play produced by Pelmadulla Art Forum in preceding years. Some of her stage plays include Idikatta, Rudiraya Saha Gangawa, Vap Magula, Elada, Seelawathi and Seema Bandhana. She quit from stage after 1980s for a long break, where she returned in 2016 with the stage play Maha Muhudath Goda Galai. Then she acted in the play Kundalakeshi, which is an experimental drama, a mix of Nadagam and Nurti.

Rathna made her maiden cinematic appearance in 1977 blockbuster Pembara Madhu directed by Senarath Yapa. She has a small role in the film, where she acted as a mad woman who runs in a road and grab the main actor Vijaya Kumaratunga. After the film, she continued to act in many dramatic supportive roles in the films Adhishtana, Binari Saha Sudu Banda, Mangala Thegga and Gurugedara. In late years, she moved to act in comedy roles in the films such as Hai Hui Babi Achchi, Parliament Jokes, Gindari and Suhada Koka. She was the mother of many in films even in her young age. The role of the mother-in-law was only for the film Uthura Dakuna.

Her maiden television acting came through Sri Lanka's first serial Dimuthu Muthu in 1979. After that, she continued to act in more than 350 television serials in four decades. Meanwhile, under the guidance of Agnes Sirisena, Rathna entered radio plays and voiced in popular radio plays such as Handiye Gedara and Muwan Palessa.

In 1981, Rathna was selected to the television serial Kopi Kade by Thevis Guruge. Her role as "Hamine" became highly popularized among the public and she was usually known by her character name rather than real name. She appeared in the series from the beginning which first aired on 1 April 1987 and continued to act in the series for more than 30 consecutive years up to date.

In 2011, she wrote a short story novel, which won a prize. In 2012, Rathna won third place in the Sahithya Visharadha Competition. She also demonstrated her skills as a radio and television dubbing artist in the programs such as Oshin, Koobichchi, Muwan Palessa, Handiye Gedara, Kusumalatha and Kanamediri Rathriya.

=== Selected Television series ===
- Ammai Thaththai
- Bhagya
- Bogoda Andaraya
- Dambulugala Sakmana
- Damini
- Dimuthu Muthu
- Dolos Mahe Gangawa
- Doo Daruwo
- Gamana
- Giraya
- Hiruta Muwawen
- Keetaya 2
- Kiri Kandulak
- Kolamba Ithaliya
- Kopi Kade
- Laa Hiru Dahasak
- Magul Sakwala
- Nidikumba Mal
- Nil Mahanel
- On Ataka Nataka
- Reedi Tharaka
- Sandagala Thenna
- Sihina Puraya
- Thimbiri Geya

== Filmography ==
Year	Film	Role	Ref.
1977	Pembara Madhu		
1980	Jodu Walalu		
1981	Situ Kumariyo		
1981	Anjaana		
1981	Induta Mal Mitak		
1982	Adhishtana	Granny	
1984	Binari Saha Sudu Banda	Menika	
1987	Mangala Thegga	Hamine	
1987	Viragaya	Sarojini's mother	
1988	Rasa Rahasak		
1988	Durga		
1991	Uthura Dakuna		
1991	Madhusamaya		
1991	Golu Muhude Kunatuwa		
1992	Sakvithi Raja		
1992	Sathya		
1993	Guru Gedara	Arjuna's mother	
1993	Prathignya		
1994	Sanda Madala	Sanda's mother	
1998	Yudha Gini Meda	Ravi's mother	
2000	Undaya	Sarala's mother	
2001	Hai Hui Babi Achchi	Dottie Auntie 'Chin Chin Nona'	
2002	Parliament Jokes	Mother of three sons	
2003	Taxi Driver		
2007	Yahaluvo		
2010	Hadawatha Mal Yayai		
2011	Putha Mage Suraya		
2015	Gindari	Malkanthi's mother	
2015	Suhada Koka	Sumudu's granny	
TBD	Marukathara		
TBD	Bodilima		
