= Vijaya Nandasiri =

Sri Lankan actor

Vijaya Nandasiri විජය නන්දසිරි
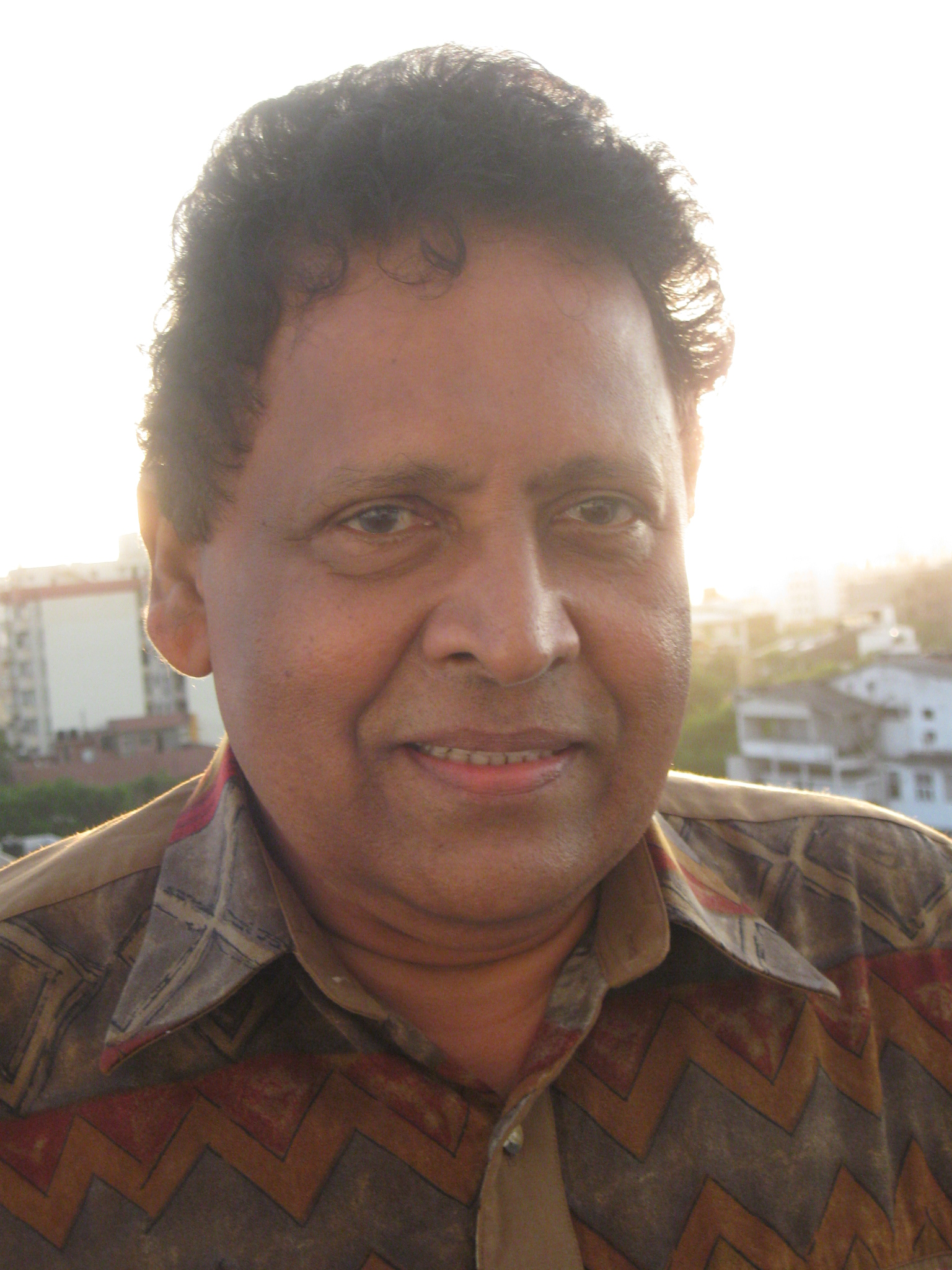
- Born: Ilukpitiya Mudiyanselage Vijaya Nandasiri; May 6, 1944; Maharagama, Sri Lanka
- Died: August 8, 2016 (aged 72); Colombo South Teaching Hospital, Kalubowila
- Education: Vidyakara Vidyalaya, Maharagama
- Occupations: Actor, director, producer, singer
- Years active: 1966–2016
- Spouse: Devika Mihirani (m. 1989)
- Children: 2
- Relatives: Lal Kularatne (cousin)

Ilukpitiya Mudiyanselage Vijaya Nandasiri (6 May 1944 – 8 August 2016 as විජය නන්දසිරි) was an actor in Sri Lankan cinema, stage drama and television. Considered a leading dramatist in Sri Lankan cinema, he was also a singer and a producer.

He had a varied career beginning in theater and extending into film as a dramatic actor; his most recent roles were steeped in comedy and include credits in Sinhala sitcoms like Nonawaruni Mahathwaruni, Ethuma, Yes Boss and Kathura.

== Personal life ==
Born on 6 May 1944 in Maharagama as the third in a family with seven siblings, he has two elder brothers, two younger brothers and two younger sisters. His father was Ilukpitiya Mudiyanselage Simon Singho who worked in the food department. His mother, Don Caroline Mabel Senadheera, worked at the Department of Health and later at the Colombo General Hospital. Nandasiri attended the Vidyakara Vidyalaya in Maharagama. He had an ambition to join military because he was a sub-lieutenant in the school cadets. Nandasiri was briefly a catering officer at the Katunayake Airport in the late-'60s as his acting career developed.

Nandasiri married fellow actress Devika Mihirani in 1989. She holds the record to be the main actress in Sri Lanka's first ever tele-drama, Dimuthu Muthu. Their first encounter was at Sudarshi Visual Arts Center, where Mihirani studied for dancing. Nandasiri was the one who invited Mihirani for the drama Subha Saha Yasa in 1974. She was studying at Anula Vidyalaya, Nugegoda. He joined her at the Chitrasena Kalaya in Kollupitiya and learned dance from Vajira. Devika's sister Sriyani Perera is married to actor Lal Kularatne.

They have two children, Navanjana and Rasanjana Suchitra. His daughter lives in Australia and son in America. Navanjana was born on 13 November 1989. Navanjana is married to businessman Chaminda Gunaratne and they married on 28 December 2012 in Hilton Colombo. His son Rasanjana started to continue his father's legacy by making mark in stage dramas, where his father previously acted.

== Acting career ==
=== Theater work ===
Mrs. Mulin Perera, who opened the doors of the school stage to Vijaya for the first time, is the wife of the editor of Sarasaviya, Navayugaya and Silumina papers, Wimalasiri Perera. He then acted in Premasiri Nawalage's 1965 stage play Paravunu Mal which was written for the School Development Fund. He made his theater debut in 1966 in the stage drama Vidura-Diva produced by Amaradasa Gunawardena for the State Drama Festival. He next obtained a role in Naribena, Jasaya saha Lenchina made by veteran drama producer Dayananda Gunawardena, who personally invited Nandasiri to become part of the cast.

He subsequently played in many stage dramas including Bakmaha Akunu by Dayananda Gunawardena, Thahanchi and Baka Thapas by Sathischandra Edirisinghe, Kontharaya, Wahalak Nathi Geyak and Sarade Sina by Prema Ranjith Thilakarathna and Bedde Goranaduwa by Ananda S. Wijesiri.

After Ran Kanda, Nandasiri was in demand, and starred in the plays Kapuwa Kapothi, Kakul Hathare Ilandariya, Subha Saha Yasa, Nariya Saha Keju Kella, Ekadipathi, Tharawo Egilethi, Rookada Raajje, Ran Kada, Sellam Badu Nowei, Kuweni and Hunuwataye Kathawa among others. Over the next years he played the character of king Maname in Prof. Ediriweera Sarachchandra's Maname more than 1000 times, and appeared in Singha Bhahu, Mahasara and Ratnawalee. Nandasiri finally achieved fame in 1971 in the play Ran Kanda. In all, he has done over 40 plays staged island-wide.

As a dramatist, he has helmed several successful plays. These include Vrushaba Raja, and Kusa Pabawathie.

When he reached 46th anniversary as an actor in 2012, he celebrated his personal milestone by organizing Wijayanandaya' film festival from 20–25 March 2012 at John de Silva Theatre performing his most popular stage dramas.

Nandasiri simultaneously worked in all three aspects of cinema evenly. In last years, he worked on stage dramas like Malwadam Anawashyai, and Balloth ekka ba. He was working on the comedy drama Aluth horek one of Ajith Mendis at the Wayambe provincial council auditorium, Kurunegala, where he got sick next day and died.

== Television career ==
Nandasiri's early television credits include K.A.W. Perera's Gamana and Pramada Wedei. He was later a producer of the teledrama Humalaya. He won the Award for the Best Comedian for his role in Sikka.

The turning point of his performance was the Nonawaruni Mahathwaruni (which is a re-make of the popular Hindi sitcom Shriman Shrimati produced by Adhikari Brothers) sitcom directed by Jayaprakash Sivagurunathan. He became famous as a comedy actor with the character of Gunadasa Premachandra in the sitcom Nonawaruni Mahathwaruni and later through Yes Boss as Senarath Dunusinghe. He also acted in numerous teledramas and sitcoms. He also hosted children's quiz program Punchi Pahe Man which was telecasted on Sirasa TV.

=== Selected serials ===
- Bhagya
- Class Sinhala Class
- Ethuma
- Hathara Wate
- Hathare Kanuwa
- Kathura
- Kawda Bole Ethuma 1
- Kekiri
- Mathi Nethi Daa
- Methuma
- Nonawaruni Mahathwaruni
- Raja Varama
- Satakapata
- Senehase Geethaya
- Sikka
- Yes Boss
- Yes Madam
- Jara Mara

== Cinema career ==
He first came to prominence from the movie Ran Kenda. In 1973, Vijaya made his maiden cinematic appearance in the film Matara Achchi directed by Sathischandra Edirisinghe. In 1976, Nandasiri met K.A.W. Perera while staging T. B. Ilangaratne's Shailasanaya. Perera gave him his first film role in the movie Nedayo. The character was a blind person who sings the song Sanasum Susuman Pavila which is still a popular song among people, as his starring in the scene was absolutely realistic. Some of the films with his dramatic roles include Yasa Isuru, Sandakada Pahana, Bengali Walalu, Sasara and Rail Para. He won The Best Actor award for his role of the match maker in Sikuru Hathe and later in 2011 as the Best Comedian for King Hunther.

== Illness and death ==
Nandasiri was suffering from diabetes over a long period of time. Owing to a wound on his leg, due to severe infection, the leg was amputated and from that point, he was using an artificial leg.

On 8 August 2016, Nandasiri died while being taken to the Kalubowila Teaching Hospital after suffering from a cardiac arrest.

== Filmography ==
Year	Film	Role	Ref.
1973	Mathara Aachchi	Police Officer	
1974	Wasthuwa		
1976	Thilaka Ha Thilaka		
1976	Mangala		
1976	Nedayo	Mahinda Gunarathne	
1977	Tom Pachaya	Dancer	
1978	Siri Pathula	Athula	
1978	Sasara	Upali Rankatiya	
1979	Samanmali	Asanka	
1979	Gahaniyak	Prosecutor	
1979	Higana Kolla	Ronald Jayarathne	
1980	Sabeetha		
1980	Kinduru Kumari	Thilak	
1980	Mage Amma		
1981	Eka Dawasak Ra	Inspector Ranawaka	
1981	Amme Mata Samawenna	Rohana	
1981	Bangali Walalu	Kapila	
1982	Yasa Isuru	Ajith Wickramasinghe	
1982	Wathura Karaththaya		
1982	Rail Para		
1983	Ran Mini Muthu		
1983	Sister Mary	Siripala	
1983	Monara Thanna 2		
1984	Hadawathaka Wedana		
1984	Ranmalige Wasanawa	Chandana / Senaka	
1985	Chalitha Rangali		
1985	Aya Waradida Oba Kiyanna		
1985	Sudu Mama		
1985	Du Daruwo		
1988	Sandakada Pahana	Priyantha	
1989	Badulu Kochchiya		
1990	Jaya Kothanada		
1990	Christhu Charithaya	Shadipathiya	
1994	Dhawala Pushpaya	Pathirana	
1994	Vijaya Geetha	Shelterer	
2002	Pissu Double	Wickie	
2002	Bahubuthayo	Drunken god	
2003	Pissu Trible	Sakalasuriya 'Mudalali'	
2003	Taxi Driver		
2004	Left Right Sir	Pinto	
2004	Ohoma Harida	Namali's father	
2005	Samanala Thatu	Doctor	
2006	Ran Kevita	Suran's father	
2007	Sikuru Hathe	Mangala Jaya	
2007	Ai Oba Thaniwela		
2009	Sir Last Chance	Detective Sir Last Chance	
2010	Kshema Bhoomi		
2010	Mago Digo Dai	Sargent C.K Perera / Mago	
2011	King Hunther	King Hunther / Ahethuka	
2012	Sakvithi Dadayama	Maxim	
2013	It’s a Matter of Love	Robert	
2014	Ko Mark No Mark	Mark / Minister Palutupana	
2015	Suhada Koka	Minister Rajamanthri	
2016	64 Mayam	Soysa. Posthumous release	
2019	Sikuru Yogaya	Master	
TBD	Breaking News	Posthumous release	
TBD	Ela Dabala	Benny / Bonny. Posthumous release	
