= Udayakantha Warnasuriya =

Sri Lankan filmmaker

- Born: Colombo, Sri Lanka
- Occupations: Film director, producer, screenwriter

Udayakantha Warnasuriya is a Sri Lankan film director, producer, screenwriter and author. Considered to be one of Sri Lanka's best film makers, Warnasuriya has made many movies, including Gini Avi Saha Gini Keli, Rosa Wasanthe, Hiripoda Wassa, Randiya Dahara and Asai Man Piyabanna.

By 2018, Warnasuriya had directed 25 films, produced 7 films, wrote 5 film stories, 9 film scripts, 2 film dialogues and 3 film screenplays.

== Filmography ==
=== Films ===
Year	Title	Director	Producer	Writer	Art Director
1985	Karadiya Walalla	No	No	Yes	Yes
1997	Mahamera Usata	Yes	No	Yes	No
1998	Gini Avi Saha Gini Keli	Yes	No	Yes	No
1999	Bahu Bharya	Yes		Yes	Yes
2000	Rajya Sevaya Pinisai	Yes		Yes	
2001	Rosa Wasanthe	Yes		Yes	
2002	Bahubuthayo	Yes	Yes	Yes	
2003	Le Kiri Kandulu	Yes	Yes	Yes	
2003	Yakada Pihatu	Yes		Yes	
2004	Diya Yata Gindara	Yes		Yes	
2004	Randiya Dahara	Yes		Yes	
2006	Hiripoda Wassa	Yes		Yes	
2007	Asai Man Piyabanna	Yes		Yes	
2007	Ran Kevita	Yes	Yes	Yes	
2009	Paya Enna Hiru Se	Yes			
2011	Challenges	Yes	Yes	Yes	
2012	Kusa Pabha		Yes		
2012	Senasuru Maruwa	Yes	Yes	Yes	
2013	Ran Kevita 2	Yes	Yes	Yes	
2014	Kosthapal Punyasoma	Yes		Yes	
2015	Gindari (Bahubuthayo 2)	Yes	Yes	Yes	
2017	Bandhanaya	Yes	Yes		
2018	Madhura Charika	Yes	Yes	Yes	
2018	Wassanaye Sanda	Yes	Yes	Yes	
2019	President Super Star	Yes	Yes	Yes	
2021	Ginimal Pokuru	Yes		Yes	
2024	Ridee Seenu	Yes	Yes	Yes	
2024	Gini Avi Saha Gini Keli 2	Yes	No	Yes	No

=== Teledramas ===
- Sagaraya Parada
- Diyasuliya
- Eka Gei Kurullo
- Menik Ketayama
- Senehase Geethaya

== Controversy ==
In 2017, Warnasuriya was arrested for allegedly making a film to duplicate the performances of veteran film actor Bandu Samarasinghe. The actor made a complaint against Warnasuriya and similar actor Bindu Bothalegama. On a previous occasion, Warnasuriya and four others were summoned. They were released on a surety bail of Rs.10,000.

== Author ==
Warnasuriya has written two books, based on his popular films.

- Yakada Pihatu
- Wassanaye Sanda
