= The Newspaper =

2020 Sri Lankan drama thriller film

- official poster
- Sinhala: ද නිවුස් පේපර්
- Directed by: Sarath Kothalawala; Kumara Thirimadura
- Written by: Sarath Kothalawala; Kumara Thirimadura
- Produced by: Bandula Gunawardane; Ravindra Guruge; H.D. Premasiri
- Starring: Sarath Kothalawala; Kumara Thirimadura; Gihan Fernando; Dharmapriya Dias
- Cinematography: Chandana Jayasinghe
- Edited by: Rukmal Nirosh
- Music by: Gayathri Khemadasa
- Distributed by: EAP Theaters
- Release date: 2 July 2020
- Running time: 103 minutes
- Country: Sri Lanka
- Language: Sinhala

The Newspaper (Sinhala: ද නිවුස් පේපර්) is a 2020 Sri Lankan Sinhala drama thriller film co-directed by Sarath Kothalawala and Kumara Thirimadura. It is produced by Bandula Gunawardane along with Ravindra Guruge and H.D. Premasiri. It stars both directors Kothalawala and Thirimadura in lead roles where Gihan Fernando, Dharmapriya Dias and Pubudu Chathuranga made supportive roles. Music composed by Gayathri Khemadasa.

A special screening of the film was held at the Savoy Premier Hall in Wellawatte on 29 June 2020. A special screening will be held on the 24 July 2020 at 4 pm at the Wilmax Cinema Hall in Anuradhapura. A special screening and dialogue of the film was held on the 3 September 2020 at the Savoy Premiere (Roxy) Cinema Hall, Wellawatte.

== Plot ==
Guna is a kind hearted man who lives a righteous life with his mother without burdening the country. Their lives are turned upside down by misinformation published on a newspaper. Guna and his family members are branded as terrorists by the villagers who read the newspaper. The villagers deciding to take the law into their own hands break Guna's limbs, sets fire to his house and drives his family out of the village. After this incident Guna is relegated to a homemade wheel chair and lives a poverty stricken life. Amongst the villagers he is only supported by his friend Luvis.

One day, Guna comes across a piece of a newspaper article at a market stall declaring that his brother was unjustly blamed for the bombing of an army bus. He shows the article to his mother and other villagers in an attempt to clear their family's name from unjust accusations and hatred. However, the villagers and village council mock Guna because the newspaper article lacks a title. Following his mother's advice, Guna decides to take the story to Colombo with the goal of getting it published on the front page.During their journey, Guna and Luvis face numerous obstacles as every newspaper they visit refuses to correct the false news. Meanwhile, a young journalist named Tharushi assists them along the way. In a turn of events, Luvis lands in jail after slapping the editor-in-chief, Senarath Iddamalgoda, of a particular newspaper company.

After getting bail, they again go to the newspaper company where Tharushi works, where they are told to get police clearance if they want their story published. Guna and Luvis come across a roberry and helps the Police to catch the robber. Afterwards the news spreads quickly to the gang leader, who starts a plan to frame and kill Guna and Luvis. Meanwhile, under the pressure of the Police chief, the newspaper editor agrees to publish the corrected story about Guna's brother. On their return journey back to their village, Guna is too slow and misses Luvis to catch the train at the Fort Station. Guna tells Luvis, that he will catch the next train. So Luvis gets on to the train headed back to the village. At the station Guna stumbles across an envelope packed with drugs, whilst Guna innocently tries to find the owner of the envelope he is shot and killed presumably by a gang member with the envelope still in his hand. When Luvis returns to the village, he comes across the dead body of Guna's mother, so he buries the body placing the corrected paper article on top of the grave. The next day, the headline of the newspaper cites a death of a drug dealer at the Fort, which was actually the death of innocent Guna.

== Cast ==
- Sarath Kothalawala as Guna
- Kumara Thirimadura as Luvis
- Dharmapriya Dias as Journalist
- Pubudu Chathuranga as Newspaper seller
- Gihan Fernando as Senarath Iddamalgoda
- Shyam Fernando as Hela Udawa editor in chief
- Giriraj Kaushalya as Cabinet minister
- Wasantha Kumaravila as Robbery leader
- Nethalie Nanayakkara as Guna's mother
- Mihira Sirithilaka as Security officer
- Jayalal Rohana as News editor
- Umayangana Wickramasinghe as Lady at food corner
- Dimuthu Chinthaka as Mudalali
- Dayadewa Edirisinghe as Gunathilaka
- Hemantha Iriyagama as Traffic police officer
- Mashi Siriwardena as Tharushi
- Sarath Karunaratne as Lottery seller
- Nilmini Kottagoda as Lady at Fort Station
- Sarath Kulanga as Silva
- Ananda Athukorala as Trishaw passenger
- Sarath Chandrasiri as Village monk
- Ajith Lokuge as Opposition parliamentarian
- Ruwan Madanayaka as Thief at station
- Wasantha Moragoda as Police spokesman
- Rukmal Nirosh as Buddhist monk
- Chinthaka Pieris as Jayasena
- Janaka Ranasinghe as Trishaw driver
- Priyantha Sirikumara as Hemapala
- Chandima Karunadasa as Street Prostitute

== Awards ==
The film received positive reviews from critics. The DVD of the film was released in the last week of December 2020 at the Sarasavi Bookshop premises at the One Galle Face Shopping Complex, Colombo. The film won the second best film in the Asian Cinema Competition at the 2022 Bengaluru International Film Festival (BIFFes). In May 2022, the film won the award for the Best Director at the 23rd Rainbow Film Festival in London.

The film has been nominated for the award for "Best Indian sub continental Film" among films from South Asian countries at the Indian Film Festival of Melbourne. In September 2022, Thirimadura and Kothalawala were awarded joint Best Actors at the 18th Kazan International Film Festival.
