= Chandima Karunadasa =

Sri Lankan actress in cinema, theatre and television

- චන්දිමා කරුණාදාස
- Born: 16 February 1989 (age 37); Punewa, Sri Lanka
- Education: Maithreepala Senanayake Central College, University of Kelaniya
- Occupation: Actress
- Spouse: Tharindu Dissanayake
- Parents: Karunadasa (father); Ariyalatha Gnanawathi (mother)
- Awards: Raigam Tele'es Best Teledrama Supporting Actress Award, Best Supporting Teledrama Actress at State Television Awards Ceremony.

Chandima Karunadasa (චන්දිමා කරුණාදාස: born 16 February 1989), is a Sri Lankan actress. She is most notable for playing the role "Darling akka" in the popular teledrama Paara Dige .

== Personal life ==
She was born on 16 February 1989 in Punewa, Sri Lanka. Her father is Karunadasa and mother is Ariyalatha Gnanawathi. She completed education from Maithreepala Senanayake Central College, Medawachchiya. Then she obtained her Bachelor of Arts degree in Drama and Theatre at the University of Kelaniya. She has three elder sisters: Pushparani, Dulmini and Kasthuri.

Karunadasa is married to Tharindu Dissanayake, an entrepreneur.

Before entering mainstream acting, she worked as an assistant lecturer for Department of Drama, Cinema and Television at the University of Kelaniya from 2015 to 2018.

== Career ==
Karunadasa started her acting career in 2016 with the teledrama ''Bhawaharana'' directed by Janaka Chaminda. Then in the same year, she acted in the teledrama ''Nethu Addara'' by same director. However, her first breakthrough acting role came through the award winning teledrama ''Paara Dige'' directed by Jayaprakash Sivagurunathan in 2021. Her role as "Darling akka" became very popular and made award nominations as well. Then she acted in Sivagurunathan's other teledramas such as ''Circuskarayo'' in 2023 and currently in ''Jahuta''. In 2020, at the Sumathi Awards, Karunadasa nominated the award for the Best Upcoming Actress for the role in the teledrama ''Awasan Husma Thek''. Then in 2024 at the Raigam Tele'es, she won the Raigam Tele'es Best Teledrama Supporting Actress Award for the teledrama Viyali. Later she won two other Supporting Actress awards for the same teledrama at the State Television Awards and Nominated as Best Supporting Actress at Sumathi Awards in 2025.

Apart from teledramas, she made a supporting role in the award-winning film ''The Newspaper (film)'' co-directed by Sarath Kothalawala and Kumara Thirimadura in 2020. In threater, she acted in the plays: ''Premawantha Kumarayo'', ''Mahasupina'' and ''Niyangala Premaya''.

In 2017, she was nominated for the best supporting actress at the National Stage Drama Festival for the play ''Silgath Billo''. In 2018, she won the award for the best lead role for the short film ''Waves Interrupted'' directed by Dimon John. Then in the same year, she won another award for the Best actress at the 7th National Youth Short Film Festival for the film ''Kaalatharana''.

== Teledramas ==
- Bhawaharana
- Nethu Addara
- Bonchi Gedara Indrajala
- Awasan Husma Thek
- Agni Piyapath
- Sulanga Maha Meraka
- Paara Dige
- Mahapolowa
- Paara Wasaa Etha
- Circuskarayo
- Viyali
- Jahuta
- Genu Pirimi Mal Palathuru
- Pirinivan Kandu Pamula

== Filmography ==
Year	Film	Role	Director	Ref.
2020	The Newspaper	Prostitute	Sarath Kothalawala Kumara Thirimadura	
TBD	Dari (Upcoming)	Ariyawathi	Bertram Nihal	
TBD	Megha Warsha	Mother	Udayakantha Warnasuriya	

== Short Films ==
- Waves Interrupted

== Awards and Nominations ==
Year	Nominee / work	Award	Result
2017	Silgath Billo Stage Drama	Best Supporting Actress - National Stage Drama Festival	Nominated
2018	Waves Interrupted Short Film	Best Performance in a Lead Role - Agenda 14 Goethe-Institut	Won
2018	Kaalatharana Short Film	Best Actress - 7th National Youth Film Festival	Won
2020	Awasan Husma Thek Teledrama	Best Upcoming Actress - Sumathi Awards	Nominated
2023	Paara DigeTeledrama	Best Supporting Actress Award	Won
2024	Viyali Teledrama	Best Supporting Actress - Raigam Tele'es	Won
2025	Viyali Teledrama	Best Supporting Actress - Sumathi Awards	Nominated
2025	Viyali Teledrama	Best Supporting Actress - State Rupavahini Awards	Won
