= Walampoori: Seven and Half Dreams =

- Sinhala: වාලම්පුරි හෙවත් හීන හතහමාරක්
- Directed by: Lakmal Darmarathna
- Written by: Lakmal Darmarathna
- Story by: Lakmal Darmarathna; Damitha Chandrasiri
- Produced by: Asanka Dodantenna; Pradeep Perera
- Starring: Priyantha Sirikumara; Thumindu Dodantenna; Sarath Kothalawala; Anjana Premaratne; Dilhani Ekanayake; Ashan Dias; Niroshan Wijesinghe; Wasantha Moragoda; Darshan Dharmaraj
- Cinematography: Kalinga Deshapriya
- Edited by: Sankha Malwatte; Tharindu Kariyawasam
- Music by: Chinthaka Jayakody
- Production companies: Antworks Entertainment; Green Light Films
- Distributed by: Scope Cinemas
- Release date: 25 April 2025
- Running time: 150 minutes
- Country: Sri Lanka
- Language: Sinhala
- Box office: LKR 150 Million (Worldwide)

Walampoori: Seven and Half Dreams (Walampoori: Hevath Heena Hatha Hamaarak ) (Sinhala: වාලම්පුරි හෙවත් හීන හතහමාරක්), is a 2025 Sri Lankan Sinhalese thriller film directed by Lakmal Darmarathna and produced by Asanka Dodantenna and Pradeep Perera. It stars Priyantha Sirikumara, Thumindu Dodantenna and Sarath Kothalawala in lead roles where Anjana Premaratne, Dilhani Ekanayake, Ashan Dias, Niroshan Wijesinghe, Wasantha Moragoda and late Darshan Dharmaraj made supportive roles. In the film, revolves around the efforts of a theatre artist named Sidney and his theatre group to sell a Walampoori and the problems they face while trying to sell it. It is debut film of koombiyo TV series creators.

== Reception ==
Walampoori: Seven and Half Dreams, released in cinemas island wide and in many countries worldwide on 25 April 2025, in theaters received positive reviews from critics. Its soundtrack, cinematography, direction, screenplay and performances were praised. The film also became the first film to be released in many countries around the world on the same day. The film grossed Rs. 4 million on its first day after its release, making it the highest opening day box office grosser for a Sri Lankan film.

As of 12 May 2025, the film's producers confirmed that the film had grossed Rs. 150 million (worldwide) in 3 weeks. It is one of the highest-grossing films of 2025 and in the history of Sri Lankan cinema and is the first Sri Lankan film to earn the highest worldwide box office revenue. Film critics are of the opinion that this is a record-breaking box office revenue in the history of Sri Lankan films.

== Cast ==
- Priyantha Sirikumara as Sydney
- Dilhani Ekanayake as Madam Sisika
- Thumindu Dodantenna as Priyankara
- Sarath Kothalawala as Nimalasiri
- Ashan Dias as Angelo
- Anjana Premaratne as Chinthaka
- Darshan Dharmaraj as Swami Makandaraja (Voice by Darshan Thevaraja)
- Wasantha Moragoda as Police OIC Saman
- King Ratnam as Jabeer
- Niroshan Wijesinghe as Kasthuri
- Udayanthi Kulatunga as Sriyani, Sydney's wife
- Daya Thennakoon as Chandare
- Janitha Perera as Sister
- Thushari Jithmini
- Anushka Ranasinghe
- Shathis Hettithanthri
- Jude Emmanuel
- Nilwala Vishwamali
- Chandana Kularatne
- Tracy Holsinger
- Peter Jerome Perera
- Danushka Jayaratne
- Bharathi Mishra
- Bhupinder Singh
- Yashuma Watambe
- Veksilberg Dimitri
- Amarathunga Athupattu
- Kavindu Himantha

== Production and release ==
This is the maiden cinema direction by award-winning teledrama director Lakmal Darmarathna, who directed the critically acclaimed popular teledrama Koombiyo as well as an assistant director for numerous teledramas since 2005. He also made the script and story of the film along with Damitha Chandrasiri, where script supervision done by Shashika Fonseka. The film is produced by Shri Light Films.

Executive producers are Asanka Dodantenna, Pradeep Perera, where linear producers are Primal Ranasinghe and Udara Abeysundara. Kalinga Deshapriya is the cinematographer with the assistance of Dimuthu Kalinga and Majith Uyangoda. Co-editors are Sankha Malwatte and Tharindu Kariyawasam. Sound mixing done by Athula Jayasinghe, color mixing by Dinindu Jagoda and art direction by Nuwan Sanurankha de Silva.

Composition and hairstyling handled by Priyantha Dissanayake, costume design by Lasantha Udukumbura and visual effects by Nasafi Mohamed. Chamara Selara is the first assistant Director, and second assistant directors are Richie Fank, Nuwan Srinath, Sankha Weerasinghe, Pradeep Rajapaksa ad Devika Kumari.

Anjana Ashubodha handled production management with the assistance of Chathura Deshan. Production coordination co-handled by Hashan Nisitha and Risha Akram. Music director is Chinthaka Jayakody and lyricist is Dinendra Jayaweera Bandara.

The film was released throughout the country on 25 April 2025. Apart from that, it is scheduled to screen in more than 15 countries around the world including Australia, Canada, Italy, New Zealand, America, Japan and Finland.

== Soundtracks ==
No.	Title	Music	Artist	Length
1.	"බඹරු අඩන්නා..."	Chinthaka Jayakodi	Dinendra Jayaweera Bandara	02:44
