= Khemadasa =

Khemadasa is a surname. Notable people with the surname include:

- Gayathri Khemadasa, Sri Lankan composer
- Premasiri Khemadasa (1937–2008), Sri Lankan music composer
