= Dharmapriya Dias =

Sri Lankan actor and director (born 1975)

- ධර්මප්‍රිය ඩයස්
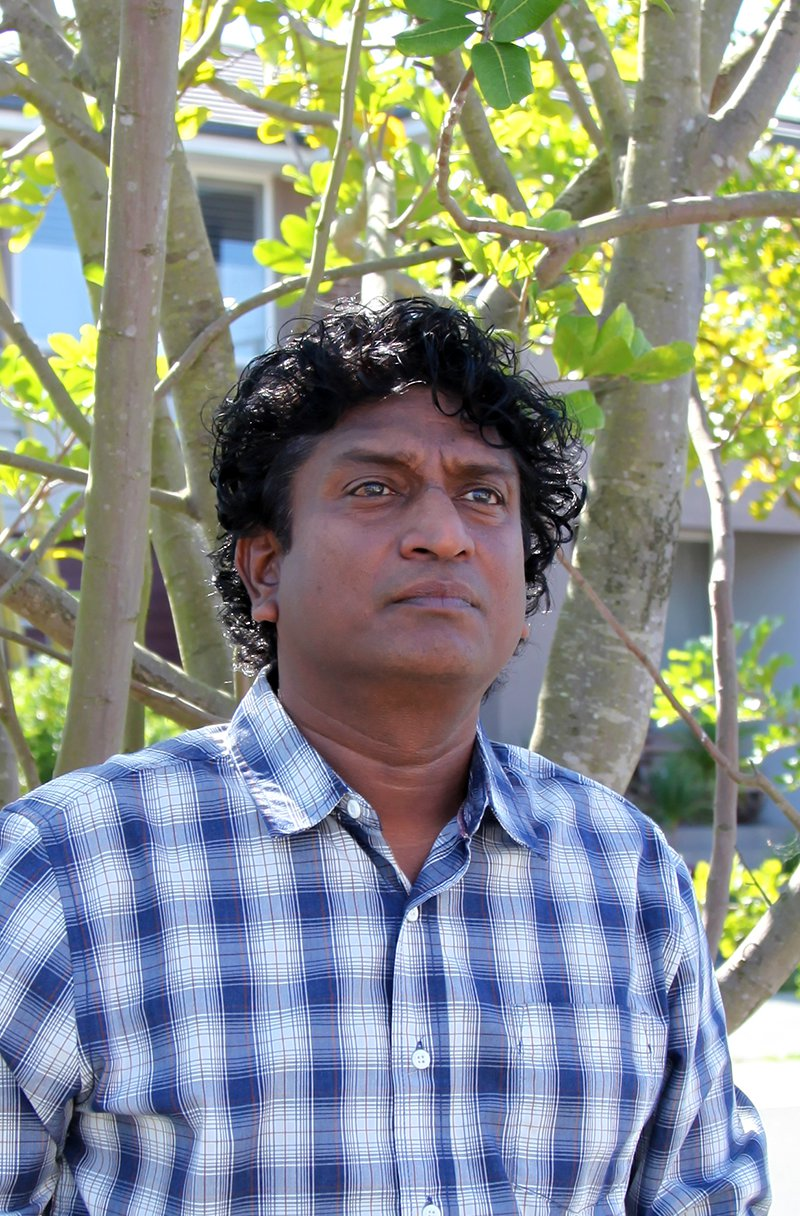
- Born: Halaperuma Arachchige Dharmapriya Dias; 19 April 1975 (age 51); Kesbewa, Sri Lanka
- Citizenship: Sri Lankan
- Education: Piliyandala Central College; Sir John Kotelawala College; University of Kelaniya; University of Colombo
- Occupations: Actor, Dramatist, Director, Teacher
- Notable work: Deweni Inima, Nadagamkarayo, Passport, Koombiyo, Machan, Mama Nemai Wena Kenek
- Spouse: Anoja Milanthi (married 2007–present)
- Children: 2
- Parents: Halaperuma Arachchige Publis Dias (father); Rathnayake Mudiyanselage Heen Menike (mother)
- Awards: Best Actor, Best Set Designer, Best Choreography
- Website: dharmapriyadias.com

Halaperuma Arachchige Dharmapriya Dias (Sinhala: ධර්මප්‍රිය ඩයස්) is an actor in Sri Lankan cinema, stage drama and television. And a professional dubbing artist since 1995. Dias has titles such as playwright, actor, set designer, choreographer, teacher of art and has a master's degree in theatre and drama. He is the performing arts and sculpture art teacher in Shasthrananda Vidyalaya, Dehiwela.

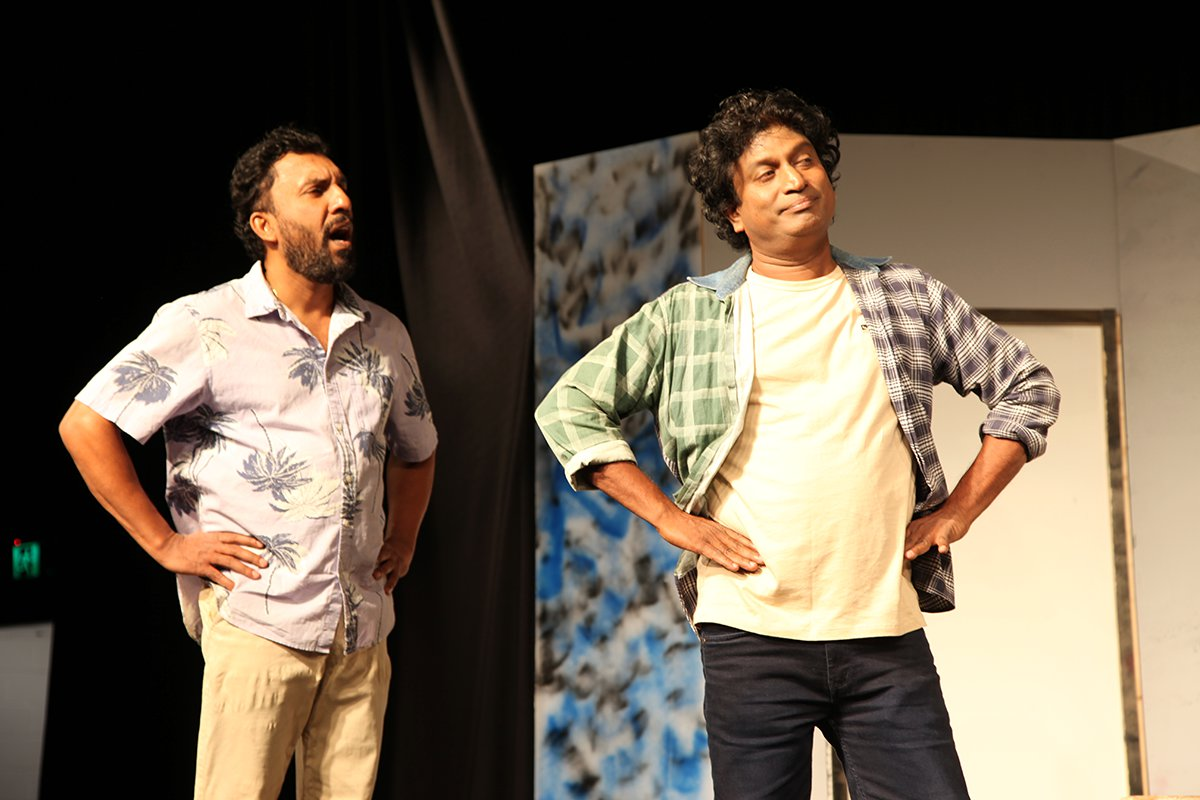
Mama Nemai Wena Kenek (stage drama) at The Pioneer Theatre, Sydney, Australia

== Personal life ==
Dharmapriya has one brother and three sisters. He studied at Sir Jhon Kothalawala College from grade 1 to O-Levels. He completed his education from Piliyandala Central College, where he started drama under Premakumara Karunaratne. He is married to Anoja Milanthi and the couple has two sons - Swarna Rawana and Prawara Bhashana.

== Career ==
Just after advanced level, he started to act in stage dramas. He acted in a stage play together with his fellow school leavers and the drama was selected for the final stage of State Drama Festival as well. His talents were polished under the direction of Sri Lanka's renowned artists such as Bandula Vithanage, K. B. Herath, Jayalath Manoratne, Rajitha Dissanayake, Thumindu Dodantenna and Chamika Hathlawaththa.

His maiden stage drama direction came through Saadaya Marai Salli Hamarai. The drama reached a box office success within two years having run more than 200 shows. The drama also won several awards at the State Drama Festival, 2015 for the categories of best actor, actress, and state manager. The final show before the break was staged on 20 November 2016. The drama won the awards for Best Actor, Best Actress and Best Stage management at the 2015 Sri Lankan State Drama Festival. He won the best Set Designer Award at the state drama festival for Daasa Mallige Bangalawa co-directed by Ruwan Malith Peris, and Kalana Gunasekara. He is also the set designer of his own productions such as: Gahanu Vada Arabathi aka Lysistrata, Sadaya Marai Salli Hamarai, Mama Nevei Vena Kenek, Julius Ceaser, as well as Jayalath Manoratne's Lokaya Thani Yayak, and Rajitha Dissanayake's plays Siriwardena Pawula, Sihina Horu Aran, Bakamuna Veedi Basi.

With award-winning performances in stage dramas, Dias was able to move into the television drama career with some popular serials directed by Saranga Mendis, Sudatha Rohana, Janaka Siriwardena, and Dee Gee Somapala.

Dias started his film career with Walapatala back in 2008, directed by Vijitha Gunarathna with a minor role. He played minor roles in Vijitha Gunaratne's Wala Patala and two other films Bora Diya Pokuna and Nahi Werena Werani. His most popular cinema acting came through films Machan, Puthandiya and Asandhimitta. The role in Machan as Stanley was highly praised by the critics and earned him the award for Best Actor.

=== Notable works ===
- Apahu Heranna Ba
- Arundhathi
- Asinamaali
- Bakamuna Weedi Basi
- Banku Weeraya
- Baraniya
- Buruwa Mahaththaya
- Dasa Mallige Bangalawa
- Deveni Mahindha
- Dolahak
- Guru Tharuva
- Guti Kemata Niyamithai
- Hari Apuru Dawasak
- Hayina
- Hithala Gaththu Theeranayak
- Jayasirita Pissu
- Julius Caesar
- Kaneru Mal
- Lysistrata(Gahanu Veda arabathi)
- Makarakshaya
- Malima
- Mama Newei Wena Kenek
- Mata Wedi Thiyan Nedda?
- Muhunata Muhuna
- Muthu Ataye Geethaya
- Nambu Kara Vilasini
- Nathuwa Bari Minihek
- Romaya Gini Gani
- Sadaya Marai Salli Hamarai
- Sihina Horu Aran
- Sihina Sappuwa
- Suriyamal
- Sukarayek Samaga
- Vara Mal
- Vanisiye Wellenda
- Vasu Deva
- Veeraya Marila
- Visekariyo

=== Short plays ===
- Poparmama Saha Pinthuraya
- Binduwa
- Sanda Sewannella
- Kiri Muttiya Gagegiya
- Chandravathi samaga rathriyak
- Parani Malavun(Based on Franze Kafka's Short Story)
- Chakrayudham (Hithata wedunu misayila 2 by Sachithra Rahubadda)

=== Television serials ===
- Adisi Nadiya
- Ai Api Sududa
- Deweni Inima as Ananda
- Gamane Ya
- His Ahasa Yata
- Hiru Kumari
- Husma Saha Oxygen
- Ingammaruwa
- Ithin Ita Passe
- Jeewithaya Dakinna
- Jodu Gedara
- Koombiyo as Padmakumara Kasthuri
- Lock Down Stories
- Maddahana
- Mahapolawa
- Nadagamkarayo
- Nil Ahasa Oba
- Nilla Penena Manaya
- Oba Nisa as Pramodha Dunukebandara
- Paradeesaya
- Pawara Menuwara
- Pini Bindu
- Pork Veediya
- Queen
- Rahai Jeewithe
- Ran Siri Mal
- Rantharu
- Sahodaraya
- Uthuvan Kande Saradiyal
- Sihina Genena Kumariye as Cyril
- Snap
- Sulanga Maha Meraka
- Three-wheel Malli
- Pirinivan Kandu Pamula

== Filmography ==
Key
†	Denotes films that have not yet been released

Year	Film	Role	Ref.
2008	Walapatala		
2008	Machan	Stanley	
2012	Matha	Lt. Kelum Dias	
2012	Prathiroo	Linta	
2016	Puthandiya	Ajith	
2016	Red Butterfly Dream		
2017	Kaala	Wattaka's henchman	
2018	Madhura Charika	Threewheel driver	
2018	Davena Wihagun	Police inspector	
2019	Asandhimitta	Wickramasekara	
2019	President Super Star	multiple roles	
2020	Ethalaya		
2020	The Newspaper	Journalist	
2021	Colombo	Jude	
2023	Viyasiduru	Driver	
2023	Rahas Kiyana Kandu		
2024	Sinhabahu		
2024	Passport	Saman	
2025	Mother Lanka		
2026	Eda Raa		
TBA	Nirwana Dupatha †		
TBA	Sulanga Numba Avidin †		
TBA	Amuthu 3k †		
TBA	O.I.C Gadafi †		
TBA	Mala Magulai †		
TBA	Pirinivan Kandu Pamula †		

== Awards and Accolades ==
He has won several awards at the local stage drama festivals and television festivals, for acting, direction and choreography.

=== Youth Drama Festival Awards ===
Year	Nominee / work	Award	Result
1996	Sanda Sewanalla (Sejant)	Best Supportive Actor	Won
-	-	-	Won

=== State Drama Festival Awards ===
Year	Nominee / work	Award	Result
2003	Hayna	Best Actor	Won
2004	Dasa Mallige Bangalawa	Best Set Designer	Won
	Gehenu Weda Arambathi	Best Choreography	Won
1997	Popar Mama Saha Pinthuraya	Merit Award	Won
2001	Asinamaali	Merit Award	Won
2017	Nathuwa Bari Minihek	Best Actor	Won

=== Sarasavi Awards ===
Year	Nominee / work	Award	Result
2008	Machan	Best Actor	Won

SIGNIES Awards

Year	Nominee / work	Award	Result
2008	Machan	Best Actor	Won

Sumathi Awards

Year	Nominee / work	Award	Result				
-	Tatte Api Awa	Best Actor	Nominated	2021	Pork Weediya	Best Supporting Actor	Nominated

Participation in International Theater and Cinema Festivals

- 6th BHARATH RANGA MAHOTHSAWA Theatre Festival, New Delhi in 2004 (HAYNA stage production)
- 8th BHARATH RANGA MAHOTHSAWA Theatre Festival, New Delhi in 2006 (SIHINA HORU ARAN Stage production)
- 11th BHARATH RANGA MAHOTHSAWA Theatre Festival, New Delhi in 2009 (makarakshaya Stage production)
- 21st International Theatre Festival for Experimental Drama, Cairo in 2009 (A WONDERUL DAY Stage production)
- 22nd International Theatre Festival for Experimental Drama, Cairo in 2010 (NO RETURN Stage production)
- Kathmandu International Theatre Festival, Kathmandu in 2010 (A WONDERFUL DAY Stage Production)
- 72nd Venice Film Festival, Venice in 2008 (MACHAN movie)
- 4th Dubai International Film Festival, Dubai, in 2009 (MACHAN movie)
- 10th Jeonju International Film Festival, South Korea, in 2009 (MACHAN movie)
- 39th Molodist International Film Festival, Ukraine in 2009 (MACHAN movie)
