= Mage Wam Atha =

Mage Wam Atha මගේ වම් අත
- Directed by: Linton Semage
- Written by: Linton Semage
- Produced by: Linton Semage; Harsha Caldera
- Starring: Linton Semage; Dilhani Ekanayake; Gayani Gisanthika
- Cinematography: M. D. Mahindapala
- Edited by: Elmo Halliday
- Music by: Pradeep Ratnayake
- Production companies: Prasad Color Lab, Chennai
- Distributed by: CEL Theatres
- Release date: 6 September 2002
- Running time: 85 minutes
- Country: Sri Lanka
- Language: Sinhala

Mage Wam Atha aka Pickpocket (My Left Hand) (Sinhala: මගේ වම් අත) is a 2002 Sri Lankan Sinhala drama film directed by Linton Semage and co-produced by Linton himself with Harsha Caldera with financial support funded by National Film Corporation of Sri Lanka. It stars Linton Semage himself with Dilhani Ekanayake in lead roles along with Gayani Gisanthika and Mahendra Perera. Music composed by Pradeep Ratnayake. It is the 1165th Sri Lankan film in the Sinhala cinema.

== Cast ==
- Linton Semage as Kamal
- Dilhani Ekanayake as Kamal's wife
- Gayani Gisanthika as Amena
- Sanet Dikkumbura as Toy seller
- Saumya Liyanage as Kamal's boss
- Mahendra Perera as Photographer
- Seetha Kumari as Wife's Mother
- Giriraj Kaushalya as Boss's henchman
- Anjula Rajapakse as Wife's sister
- Sarath Kothalawala as Farook
- Mali Jayaweerage
- Chamila Peiris
- Dimuthu Devapriya

== International screening ==
- Locarno International Film Festival, Switzerland
- Fukuoka International Film Festival, Japan
- Pusan International Film Festival, Korea
- Calgary International Film Festival, Canada
- Oslo International Film Festival, Norway
- Rotterdam International Film Festival, Netherlands
- Kerala film festival, India

== Awards ==
The film has won several awards worldwide.

- 2000 Presidential Award for Best Actor - Linton Semage
- 2000 Sri Lanka Film Critics' Forum Award for Best Actor - Linton Semage
- 2000 Sri Lanka Film Critics' Forum Award for Best Cinematography - M. D. Mahindapala
- 2000 Sri Lanka Film Critics' Forum Award for Best Director - Linton Semage
