= Whispering Mountains =

2023 Sri Lankan drama film

- Sinhala: Rahas kiyana kandu
- Directed by: Jagath Manuwarna
- Written by: Jagath Manuwarna; Namal Jayasinghe
- Produced by: Sunil T. Fernando; Nirmana Bandara; Channa Deshapriya; Rasitha Jinasena
- Starring: Jagath Manuwarna; Sarath Kothalawala; Dharmapriya Dias; Priyantha Sirikumara; Sampath Jayaweera
- Cinematography: Vishwajith Karunarathne
- Edited by: Sankha Malwaththa
- Music by: Thilanka Gamage
- Release date: 2023
- Running time: 87 minutes
- Country: Sri Lanka
- Language: Sinhala

Whispering Mountains also known as Rahas kiyana kandu (Sinhala: රහස් කියන කඳු) is a 2023 Sri Lankan Sinhala-language drama film co-written and directed by Jagath Manuwarna. It is his feature film directorial debut. The film won the NETPAC Award for the best Asian feature film at the 52nd International Film Festival Rotterdam. The film premiered in the Bright Future programme of the 2023 International Film Festival Rotterdam.

== Plot ==
A supernatural virus is spreading like a wildfire in across various parts of Sri Lanka sending shockwaves to the general public. The harsh reality is the youngsters being the main victims due to this virus as many young people commit suicide. The Disease Control Unit takes oath and promise taking responsibility to control the terrifying pandemic by any means necessary, citing supernatural forces that only ancient healing rituals can vanquish. As parents mourn the deaths and disappearances of their children, government henchmen prepare the bodies and the remaining living prisoners for a cleansing of disturbing proportions.

== Cast ==
- Jagath Manuwarna
- Sarath Kothalawala as Mr.Silva
- Priyantha Sirikumara
- Sampath Jayaweera
- Dharmapriya Dias
- Kalana Gunasekara
- Ananda Kumara Unnahe
- Lakmal Dharmarathna
- Nimal Pallewatta
- Aloka Gayathri
- Shrimal Wedisinghe
- Madini Malwatta

== Release ==
The film had its premiered in the Bright Future programme of the 2023 International Film Festival Rotterdam. It was also invited at the 28th Busan International Film Festival in 'A Window on Asian Cinema' section and will be screened in October 2023. The film was released on 2 September 2023 at the Derana Film Awards under the category of "Cinema for Tomorrow". It was theatrelical released on 17 November 2023.

== See also ==
- List of Sri Lankan films of the 2020s
