= Colombo (film) =

2021 Sri Lankan film

Colombo කොළඹ
- Directed by: Asama Liyanage
- Written by: Asama Liyanage
- Produced by: Anusha Sanjeewa Edirimuni
- Starring: Hemal Ranasinghe; Dharmapriya Dias; Kumara Thirimadura
- Cinematography: Amith Krishantha
- Edited by: Thilanka Perera
- Music by: Ajith Kumarasiri
- Production company: Team Works Media Production
- Distributed by: EAP Theaters
- Release date: 18 March 2021
- Country: Sri Lanka
- Language: Sinhala

Colombo (Sinhala: කොළඹ) is a 2021 Sri Lankan action thriller film directed by Asama Randil Liyanage and produced by Anusha Sanjeewa Edirimuni for Bees Production along with co-production by Athula Liyanage and Harindra Achalanka Kulasuriya. It stars Hemal Ranasinghe, Dharmapriya Dias, Nishan Kumara, Kumara Thirimadura, Rukmal Nirosh, and Jehan Appuhamy.

The film mostly received positive reviews from critics.

== Production ==
The production of the film began in 2016. The film was officially released on 18 March 2021 under EAP Theaters island wide. The premiere of the film was held at the Savoy Primer in Wellawatte. The theme of the film is 'Colombo is not a city but a life'.

== Cast ==
- Hemal Ranasinghe as Oscar
- Dharmapriya Dias as Jude
- Nishan Kumara as Junior
- Kumara Thirimadura as Michael
- Rukmal Nirosh as Jonny
- Jehan Appuhamy as Michael's henchman
- Chamal Ranasinghe
- Shanika Niroshi as Janani, Oscar's love interest
- Asanka Dinal
- Tharu Bogoda
- Madhumali Jayasinghe as Udari (only voice)
- Sri Prasad
- Kusal Vimukthi

== Release ==
The first release of the film took place on 18 March 2021. Then the film was screened for 42 days when the cinemas closed on May 1 due to second COVID-19 wave. Later, the second screening of the film was start on 15 July 2021 amidst of third COVID-19 wave.
