= Trilicia Gunawardena =

Sri Lankan actress and singer

Trilicia Gunawardena ට්‍රිලිෂියා ගුණවර්ධන
- Born: Trelicia Abeykoon; 14 October 1934; Kolonnawa, Sri Lanka
- Died: April 26, 1999 (aged 64); Colombo, Sri Lanka
- Education: St. Anthony's Balika Vidyalaya, Dematagoda; Musaeus College
- Occupations: Actress, Singer, Dramatist
- Years active: 1939–1999
- Spouse: Prof. A.J. Gunawardena

Trelicia Abeykoon (born 14 October 1934 – died 26 April 1999 as ට්‍රිලිෂියා ගුණවර්ධන)), popularly known as Trelicia or Trilicia Gunawardena, was an actress in Sri Lankan cinema, theater and television as well as a singer. She is best known for her roles in critically acclaimed films Gamperaliya, Nidhanaya, Kaliyagaya and Beddegama.

== Personal life ==
She was born on 14 October 1934 at Kolonnawa, Sri Lanka. She completed school education from St. Anthony's Balika Vidyalaya, Dematagoda and Musaeus College, Colombo. Then she graduated with an honors degree from University of Peradeniya and worked as a teacher at Ananda Shasthralaya, Kotte. She also worked as a lecturer in the Aesthetic department at Peradeniya University as well as University of Kelaniya. She also worked as an English Instructor at the University of the Visual and Performing Arts.

She was married to Prof. A. J. Gunawardena, an English art critic and lecturer in the English Department at the then Vidyalankara University (Kelaniya University). He also worked as a screenwriter for the films Kaliyugaya and Baddegama.

She died on 26 April 1999 at the age of 64. Her body was cremated at General Cemetery, Borella.

== Career ==
Her drama career started with U.A.S Perera's Lama Pitiya program in Radio Ceylon. She sang the song Surathal Nangiye with U.A.S Perera and W. A. Wijepala in 1939. Then in 1956, Gunawardena entered to stage drama with the main role as the first queen in play Maname by Ediriweera Sarachchandra. She starred in Prof. Sarachchandra's Hasthikantha Manthare, Dayananda Gunawardena's Naribana and Mahagama Sekera's Kundalakeshi.

Her maiden cinematic experience came through 1963 blockbuster movie Gamperaliya directed by award winning filmmaker Lester James Peries. Later she appeared in several critics acclaimed films such as Madol Doova, Baddegama, Nidhanaya, Gehenu Lamai, Nomiyena Minisun, Tharanaya and Loku Duwa. Among them, her role of 'Anula' in the film Kaliyugaya, was called by film critics as her greatest role. In 1984, she won the Sarasaviya Award for Best Supporting Actress, and later won the Presidential Award for the role. She was also awarded the Certificate of Live Cinematic Merit at the OICC Honors Ceremony.

She also appeared in several teledramas, including her acclaimed role as Lucy Hami in Giraya, which was highly praised by critics.. The drama, based on a novel by Punyakanthi Wijenayake, aired on television for ten consecutive weeks. She acted in the teledrama Beddegedara directed by Sudath Rohana and later won an OCIC award for her role as a mother. She later joined English dramas and starred in the Belgian play Caligula produced by the Professor Rudy Corrense.

As an author, she translated R. Ananthamurthy's Kannada novel 'Sanskara' into Sinhala.

=== Notable theater works ===
- Maname
- Nari Bena
- Sinhabahu
- Kundalakeshi

=== Notable television works ===
- Giraya
- Badde Gedara

== Filmography ==
Year	Film	Role	Ref.
1963	Gamperaliya	Anula	
1972	Sahanaya		
1972	Nidhanaya	Dulcy	
1976	Madol Duwa	Mrs. Dharmasinghe	
1978	Gehenu Lamai	Jenny Liyanage	
1981	Baddegama	Karalina, Silindu's sister	
1983	Kaliyugaya	Anula	
1986	Aadara Hasuna	Army officer's sister	
1988	Sagara Jalaya Madi Handuwa Oba Sanda	Village Woman	
1994	Nomiyena Minisun		
1995	Ayoma		
1996	Loku Duwa	mrs. Perera	
1997	Tharanaya		
1999	Padadaya		
2011	Dheewari	Josi. Posthumous release	
