= Ali Kathawa =

Ali Kathawa අලි කතාව
- Theatrical poster of Ali Kathawa
- Directed by: Sunil Ariyaratne
- Written by: Sunil Ariyaratne
- Produced by: Sipvin Films
- Starring: Kaushalya Nirmana; Yehani Hansika; Dhananjaya Siriwardena
- Cinematography: Channa Deshapriya
- Edited by: Thissa Surendra
- Music by: Rohana Weerasinghe
- Distributed by: EAP Theatres
- Release date: 18 May 2017
- Country: Sri Lanka
- Language: Sinhala

Ali Kathawa (An Elephant's Tale) (Sinhala: අලි කතාව) is a 2017 Sri Lankan Sinhala children's film directed by Sunil Ariyaratne and produced by Gunapala Rathnasekara for Sipvin Films. It stars a child artist Kaushalya Nirmana in lead role along with Ravindra Randeniya, Tharuka Wanniarachchi, Dhananjaya Siriwardena and Yohani Hansika. Music composed by Rohana Weerasinghe. It is the 1276th Sri Lankan film in the Sinhala cinema. The film is based on the novel Anusha Saha Raja Kumaru written by Leticia Boteju.

== Cast ==
- Kaushalya Nirmana as Bhanu ( Main Actor )
- Yohani Hansika as Sumangali
- Dhananjaya Siriwardena as King
- Tharuka Wanniarachchi as Queen
- Ravindra Randeniya as Hermit
- Duleeka Marapana as Veddah Gomari
- Rodney Warnakula as Kinnara leader
- Sarath Kothalawala as Handuna veddah
- Kumara Thirimadura as Gobila veddha
- Wilson Gunaratne as Maha Amathi
- Deepani Silva as God beseecher
- Giriraj Kaushalya as King's physician
- Jayantha Muthuthanthri as Kinnara leader's servant

== Production ==
The script based on a story by Leticia Botheju, Anusha and Raja Kumaru. All scenes of baby elephants were filmed in Chiang Mai - Thailand. Other scenes were shot in Sri Lanka.

== Soundtrack ==
No.	Title	Lyrics	Singer(s)	Length
1.	"Magul Magul Eheth Magul"	Sunil Ariyaratne	Rodney Warnakula
2.	"Punchi Hora Mage"	Sunil Ariyaratne	Nanda Malini
3.	"Nil Thanakola Budintai"	Sunil Ariyaratne	Iroshan Madushanka
4.	"Seetha Gagul Ada Hale"	Sunil Ariyaratne	Vidusha Nethranjali
