= Raigam Tele'es Best Teledrama Supporting Actress Award =

The Raigam Tele'es Best Teledrama Supporting Actress Award is presented annually in Sri Lanka by the Kingdom of Raigam associated with many commercial brands for the best Sri Lankan supporting actress of the year in television screen.

The award was first given in 2005. Following is a list of the winners of this prestigious title since then.

== Award list in each year ==
Year	Best Supporting Actress	Teledrama	Ref.
2004			
2005			
2006	Anjula Rajapakse	Olu	
2007	Samanalee Fonseka	Rala Bindena Thena	
2008			
2009	Awanthi Aponsu	Isuru Bhavana	
2010	Chandani Seneviratne	Thaksalawa	
2011	Rashmi Yalegala	Sulangata Enna Kiyanna	
2012	Duleeka Marapana	Me Wasantha Kalayay	
2013	Damayanthi Fonseka	Hopalu Arana	
2014	Ama Wijesekara	Chess	
2015	Damitha Abeyratne	Vishnu Sankranthiya	
2016	Chandani Seneviratne	One Way	
2017	Nayana Hettiarachchi	Badde Kulawamiya	
2018	Udayanthi Kulathunge	Sahodaraya	
2019	Dinupa Kodagoda	Veeraya Gedara Awith	
2020	Sulochana Weerasinghe	Thanamalvila Kollek	
2021	Anuradha Edirisinghe	Sakarma	
2024	Chandima Karunadasa	Viyali	
2025	Champa Sriyani	Sasankara	
