= Pushpadana Girls' College, Kandy =

State School in Kandy, Sri Lanka

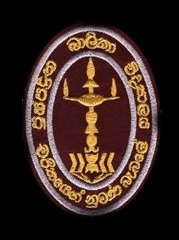

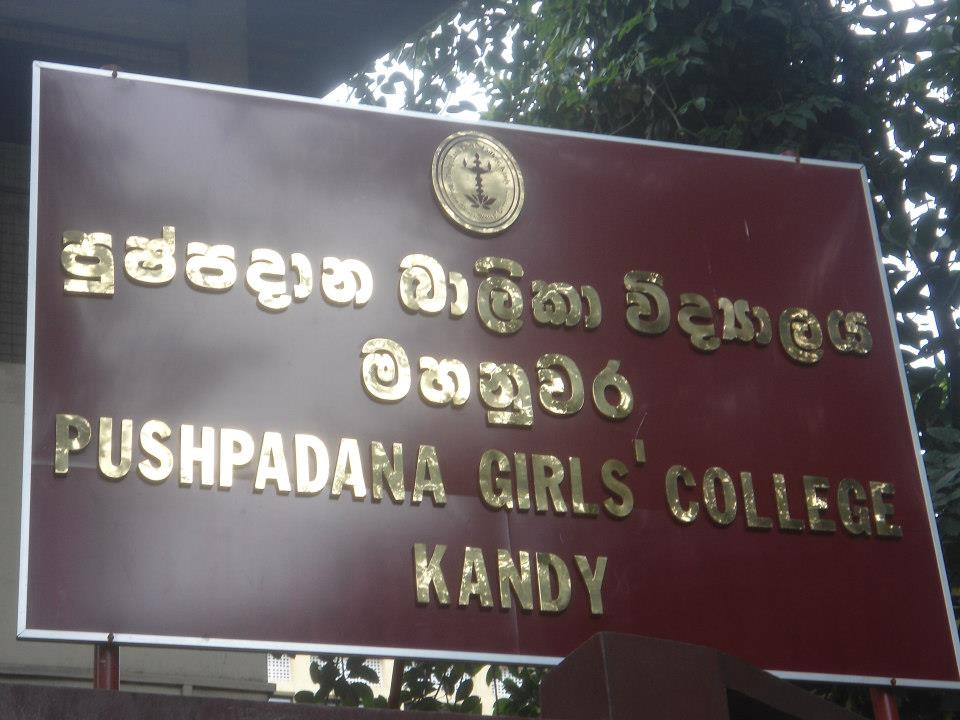

Location
- Kandy; Sri Lanka; 7°17′38″N 80°37′59″E

Information
- Type: Public
- Motto: චරිතයෙන් නුවන බැබළේ Sinhala (Wisdom shines through character)
- Religious affiliation: Buddhist
- Established: 2 July 1942; 84 years ago
- Founder: Sri Pushpadana Samithiya
- School district: Kandy
- Principal: Dulani Samarakoon
- Staff: 130
- Grades: Classes 6 - 13
- Gender: Girls
- Age: 11 to 18
- Enrollment: 2,000
- Hours in school day: 6
- Houses: Gothami, Chithra, Sangamiththa, Yashodara
- Colours: Gold, grey, maroon
- Song: English - "Wisdom through Character, Shines Ever"; Sinhala - "චරිතයෙන් නුවන බැබළේ"
- Athletics: Yes
- Sports: Yes
- Website: pushpadana.edu.lk
- Last updated: 2023-04-07

Pushpadana Girls' College is a Girls' school located in Kandy, Sri Lanka, founded in 1942 by the Sri Pushpadana Society, Kandy. Pushpadana Girls' College is situated within the historical city of Kandy.

Pushpadana Girls' College was established to give English education to Buddhist girls. The first principal was Chlora Dias Wijetilleke, the Chairman of the Sri Pushpadana Society. The school commenced with six staff and three students.

== History ==
On 31 May 1941 the idea of establishing a school to provide English education to Buddhist girls was born out of a speech made by E. W. Adhikaram at the 34th Anniversary Meeting of the Sri Pushpadana Society, Kandy.

The school was established on 2 July 1942 as a learning institution for Buddhist girls in a small building by "Sri Pushpadana Samithiya" housed in Trincomalee Street, Kandy. The school was inaugurated by the Minister of Health, George E. de Silva. The founding principal was Chlora Dias Wijetilleke, the Chairman of the Sri Pushpadana Society, as well as wife of Attorney-at-Law, S. A. Wijethilake. She was a first class English teacher and started the school with a staff of six and three students. The alphabet was read to the first three students by the Minister of Education, C. W. W. Kannangara.

By 6 May 1946 the school, had five staff members, including the principal, and 128 students. It became a government school after being handed over to the Director of Education, Ian Sandiman.

On 22 June 1953 it became a government school under the first principal, S. A. Wijetillekesiri.

After being a major government school, it was shifted to the present-day premises on 2 July 1953, with eleven staff and 400 students under the tenure of the principal, P. D. S. Kularatne. Later this day was named as the day of commemoration of the founding fathers of the school.

In 1953 the College Girl Scout Movement was started with the contribution of Rani Abeyratne.

W. M. M. de Silva was appointed as the principal of the school, serving from 3 May 1954 until 28 November 1958. Under her leadership the school set up the four school houses, and held the school's first sports meet. The school also introduced a new school uniform and started scouting at the school.

Hemamala Swarnalatha Jayasinghe became the school's next principal, serving from 1 January 1959 through to 1 September 1961. A Buddhist shrine, a teachers-parents union, advanced levels and the school's first prize giving were the major developments during her tenure.

On 1 September 1961, while working as an assistant, Subha Siriwardena, took over as the acting principal of the school. She had the honour to hold the first prize giving ceremony of the school on 11 November 1961. Also, various activities have been initiated for the students to adapt the celebration of Atasil for the Vesak Poya to a Buddhist environment.

Vishaka Gunethilake served as principal between 13 December 1961 and 30 July 1963. The school's motto, "Charithayen Nuwana Bebale", meaning "Wisdom shines through character" was adopted, and school anthem sung for the first time. The school also commenced Dharma schools, which is held in every Sunday.

Rathwatte Gnanasekaram became the principal on 31 July 1963, serving until 1 May 1965. During her principalship, extra-curricular activities started. The prize giving ceremony for the year 1963 was held on 2 December 1964 under the patronage of the Prime Minister, Sirimavo Bandaranaike.

Hema de Seram served as principal from 1 May 1965 through to 8 September 1980. She started Western music band, and an Eastern music band at the school. In 1971, GCE A/L Science curriculum commenced, the opening of a dental clinic, the opening of the hockey and the creation of a school library were some of the important services that took place during this period. The Alumni Association was established in the year 1972 to support the development of the school. With the increase in the number of students in the school, as there was not enough space in the building, the primary classes (1971 – 1 Grades, 1972 – 2 Grades, 1973 – 3 Grades, 1974 – 4 Grades, 1975 – 5 Grades) were removed and in 1975 the school was converted into a secondary school with classes from grade six upwards.

The next principal was G. K. Alahakoon Dassanayake, serving from 1980 to 2002 (the longest serving principal at the school). Under her tenure, activities such as conducting English pronunciation classes to teach students English, teaching subjects in English, giving opportunities to enjoy English drama and giving the opportunity to read daily English newspapers were initiated. Also, under her leadership, I. Godigamuwa translated the school anthem into English and directed it to be sung in the morning, creating student pledges. In the 1990s, students were given the opportunity to learn various languages such as French, Japanese and Tamil, and the teaching of aesthetics and agricultural streams for the Advanced Level began. In the same time, the school was promote to a national school with effect from 5 February 1993. Meanwhile, student hostel was opened and principal's official residence was constructed. In her late years, school started English medium section in 2002 with grade 6 students.

After the retirement of Dasanayake, M. R. Amarasekera served as the acting principal, from 4 March 2002 through to 16 August 2002.

In September 2002 W. D. P. K. Samarasinghe became the principal. During her later years as principal, the school won Kandy District second place and All Island Bronze (shared) Award for Report 2009 in the 'Annual Report and Financial Publications between National Schools' Competition jointly organised by the Ministry of Education and AAT.

G. W. L. K Egodawela was the principal at the school from 2009 to 2019. In 2017, the school became the winners of the 'Danumai Wasanawai' Quiz Tournament in the Kandy District sponsored by DSI Super Sports. At the same time, Pushpadana won the First place in the All Ceylon Air Cadet Assessment Camp in the year 2016 and second place in the year 2017.

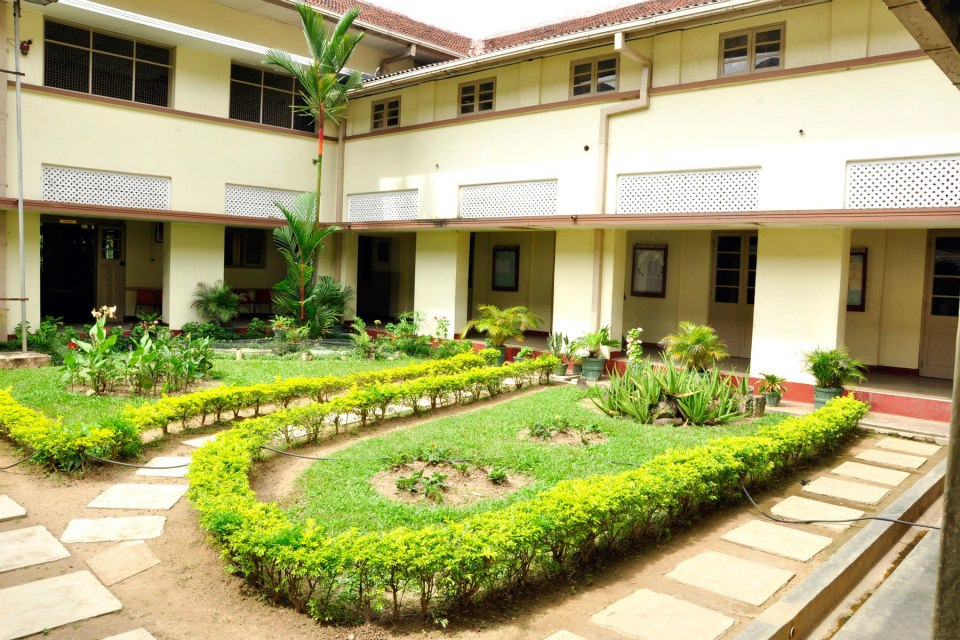
School main hall

== Achievements ==
In 2015, the school won the Kandy District Girls under 19 schools basketball Championship.

In 2017, Under-14 hockey team won the ‘Golden Star’ award at the 17th Sri Lanka Schools Hockey Carnival 2017.

In 2020, Ruchini Niwarthana won third Place of Sri Lankan Biology Olympiad 2020.

== Education ==
The school currently has about 2,000 students and 130 teachers. Therevada Buddhism has largely been an integral part of the school's education system, as it is in all Sri Lankan Buddhist public schools. The students for the school are selected mainly through grade 5 scholarship programme. Grades are from 6 to 13. The school provides all A/L disciplines from Science stream to Technology Stream.

In 2015, Nirasha Nadeeshani Kularatne won the All Island second place in the Arts stream according to the results of the GCE (A/L) examination. In 2016, according to the results of the GCE (O/L) examination, Pushpadana won the Kandy District first place, the Central Province the second place and the All Island the fourth place. Also, the percentage qualified for GCE (A/L) was 100% and the overall percentage in all subjects was 100%. According to the GCE (A/L) results of the years 2015 and 2016, the School won the first places in both the streams of Biosystems Technology and Engineering Technology.

== Past principals ==
Name	Entered office	Departed office
Chlora Diaz	1942	1948
W. M. M. de Silva (acting)	1948	1953
P. D. S. Kularatne	22 June 1953	11 April 1954
Hemamala Swarnalatha Jayasinghe	1 January 1959	1 September 1961
Subhadra Siriwardena (acting)	1 September 1961	31 December 1961
Vishaka Gunathilake	31 December 1961	20 July 1963
Rathwatte Gnanasekaram	31 July 1963	1 May 1965
Hema de Seram	1 May 1965	8 September 1980
G. K. Alahakoon Dassanayake	9 September 1980	4 March 2002
M. R. Amarasekera (acting)	4 March 2002	16 August 2002
W. D. P. K. Samarasinghe	16 September 2002	19 August 2009
G. W. L. K Egodawela	24 August 2009	2020
Dulani Samarakoon	2020	2024
Sandya Ranaweera (acting)	2024	present

== Houses ==
The students are divided into four houses. The house names are derived from Buddhist history. The houses compete annually in all major games to win inter-house games and competitions.

- – Sangamiththa
- – Yasodhara
- – Chithra
- – Gothami

== Notable alumni ==
- Chandrika Siriwardena - Singer
- Nadeeka Gunasekara - Actress

== See also ==
- Vidyartha College
- Girls' High School, Kandy
- Kingswood College, Kandy
- Mahamaya Girls' College
- Dharmaraja College
