= Sankara (2007 film) =

- title card
- Directed by: Prasanna Jayakody
- Written by: Prasanna Jayakody
- Produced by: Cine Films
- Starring: Thumindu Dodantenne; Sachini Ayendra
- Cinematography: Palitha Perera
- Edited by: Ravindra Guruge
- Music by: Nadeeka Guruge
- Production company: Cine Films
- Distributed by: EAP Theaters
- Release date: 25 January 2007
- Running time: 87 minutes
- Country: Sri Lanka
- Language: Sinhalese

Sankara (English: Introspection) (Sinhala: සංඛාරා) is a 2007 Sinhalese language drama film directed by Prasanna Jayakody and co-produced by Renuka Balasooriya and Somaratne Dissanayake for Cine Films. It stars Thumindu Dodantenna and Sachini Ayendra in lead roles along with Nilupa Heenkendaarachchi and K.A Milton Perera. Music composed by Nadeeka Guruge.

The film screened in many international festivals such as Asia Pacific Screen Awards, London Film Festival and won many awards. The film received mostly positive reviews. It is the 1082nd Sri Lankan film in the Sinhala cinema. The film was selected for the final round at Cairo International Film Festival and received rave reviews selecting it for the final round of the festival in 2006.

== Plot ==
Young Buddhist monk Ananda, arrives at a temple in order to restore its paintings. These paintings depict Thelapaththa Jathakaya, a moral story where Lord Buddha said that a man with a big target in life must not be swayed by passion (Keles), the five senses and especially beautiful women. One day, Ananda picks up a hair pin belonging to a young woman. While attempting to return this object to its owner, his repressed feelings are awoken by the beauty and sensuality of the woman. The young monk's inner spiritual world is plunged into turmoil. Then one day the paintings are destroyed. While restoring them for the second time Ananda begins to realize that he is trapped in a web of his worldly desires and attachments and highlights the inner struggle of a young Buddhist monk who finds himself attracted to a pretty village girl.

== Cast ==
- Thumindu Dodantenna as Young Monk
- Sachini Ayendra as Village Girl
- K. A. Milton Perera as Old Monk
- Nilupa Heenkendaarachchi as Unnamed Person
- Nethalie Nanayakkara
- Nirdha Uyanhewa
- Sakunathala Peiris

== Awards ==
- The Special Jury Prize The Silver Pyramid – Cairo International Film Festival 2006
- Best Debut Director – International Film Festival of Kerala 2006
- Netpac Award – International Film Festival of Kerala 2006
- Final five at Asia Pacific Screen Awards - Palitha Perera 2007
- SIGNIS Award for Creative Direction - Prasanna Jayakody
- SIGNIS Award for Creative Art Director - Sunil Wijeratne
- SIGNIS Award for Creative Music Director - Nadeeka Guruge
- SIGNIS Award for Creative Editing - Ravindra Guruge
- SIGNIS Gold Award for Creative Cinematography - Palitha Perera
