= Raigam Tele'es Best Teledrama Actress Award =

The Raigam Tele'es Best Teledrama Actress Award is presented annually in Sri Lanka by the Kingdom of Raigam associated with many commercial brands for the best Sri Lankan actress of the year in television screen.

The award was first given in 2005. The following is a list of the winners of this prestigious title since then.

== Award list in each year ==
Year	Best Actress	Teledrama	Ref.
2004	Chandani Seneviratne	Punchi Rala	
2005	Chandani Seneviratne	Jeewithayata Idadenna	
2006	Vasanthi Chathurani	Sedona	
2007	Chandani Seneviratne	Rala Bindena Thena	
2008	Nilmini Tennakoon	Hendewa	
2009	Duleeka Marapana	Isuru Bhawana	
2010	Paboda Sandeepani	Pingala danawwa	
2011	Damitha Abeyratne	Swayanjatha	
2012	Kanchana Mendis	Me Wasantha Kalayay	
2013	Nilukshi Fernando	Sadisi	
2014	Chandani Seneviratne	Chess	
2015	Menaka Pieris	Sath Pathini	
2016	Umali Thilakarathne	Boheemiyanuwa	
2017	Nadee Kammalweera	Badde Kulawamiya	
2018	Chandani Seneviratne	Sahodaraya	
2019	Shalani Tharaka	Ado	
2020	Udari Warnakulasooriya	Sansara Aranya Asabada	
2021	Champa Sriyani	Sakarma	
2022	Volga Kalpani	Manikkawatha	
2022	Umali Thilakarathne	Pithru	
2023	Semini Iddamalgoda	Eya Den Bedala	
2024	Tharindi Fernando	Viyali	
