= Sudu Sewaneli =

- සුදු සෙවණැලි
- Directed by: Sunil Ariyaratne
- Written by: Sunil Ariyaratne
- Based on: A novel by Piyadasa Welikannage
- Produced by: Charudatta Films
- Starring: Linton Semage; Vasanthi Chathurani; Roshan Pilapitiya
- Cinematography: Suminda Weerasinghe
- Edited by: Elmo Halliday
- Music by: Rohana Weerasinghe
- Distributed by: EAP Theaters
- Release date: 21 June 2002
- Country: Sri Lanka
- Language: Sinhala

Sudu Sewaneli (Shadows of White) (Sinhala: සුදු සෙවණැලි) is a 2002 Sri Lankan Sinhala drama film directed and produced by Sunil Ariyaratne for Charudatta Films. It is based on a sinhala novel of the same name written by Piyadasa Welikannage. It stars Linton Semage and Vasanthi Chathurani in lead roles along with Roshan Pilapitiya and Kanchana Mendis. Music composed by Rohana Weerasinghe. It is the 980th Sri Lankan film in the Sinhala cinema. The film won eight awards including the Best Film and the Best Lyricist at Sarasaviya Festival 2003.

== Plot ==
The story revolves around a rural family of the year 1848, where many national heroes started their rebels against British rule including Veera Puran Appu.

== Cast ==
- Vasanthi Chathurani as Podi Menike
- Roshan Pilapitiya as Heen Banda
- Linton Semage as Sudu Banda
- Iranganie Serasinghe
- Kanchana Mendis
- Nihal Fernando
- Quintus Weerakoon
- Edward Gunawardena
- G.R Perera
- Hemasiri Liyanage
- Wasantha Wittachchi
- Jagath Benaragama

== Production ==
The film has been shot around Matale, Melsiripura, Galle Fort, Wadduwa Church and some scenes of old Colombo.

== Soundtrack ==
No.	Title	Singer(s)	Length
1.	"Kiyawa Magiya"	Nanda Malini
2.	"Suriya De Rajano"	Nanda Malini
3.	"Uda Unath Pasaloswaka"	Nanda Malini
