= Le Kiri Kandulu =

Le Kiri Kandulu ලේ කිරි කඳුළු
- Directed by: Udayakantha Warnasuriya
- Written by: Udayakantha Warnasuriya
- Based on: True story
- Produced by: Udayakantha Warnasuriya
- Starring: Tony Ranasinghe; Nilmini Tennakoon; Buddhika Jayaratne
- Cinematography: Jayanath Gunawardena
- Edited by: Stanley de Alwis
- Music by: Sangeeth Wickramasinghe
- Production company: Dil Foses Lab
- Distributed by: CEL Theatres
- Release date: 9 May 2003
- Country: Sri Lanka
- Language: Sinhala

Le Kiri Kandulu (Blood, Milk and Tears) (Sinhala: ලේ කිරි කඳුළු) is a 2003 Sri Lankan Sinhala drama film directed and produced by Udayakantha Warnasuriya. It stars Tony Ranasinghe and Nilmini Tennakoon in lead roles along with Buddhika Jayaratne and Sanath Gunathilake. Music composed by Sangeeth Wickramasinghe. It is the 1009th Sri Lankan film in the Sinhala cinema.

== Plot ==
Jayananda is about 60 years old and is employed as an Executive in a private company. Jayananda and his wife Natalie live with their married daughter, her husband, and two children, and enjoy a very happy and carefree life. One night when he was driving along with his wife, through his negligence, his vehicle collides with another vehicle. The occupants of the other car were a young couple Upendra and Veena. Veena was carrying a full term baby close to giving birth, when the accident happened, and due to the accident she gives birth to a still born child.

Upendra and Veena who were eagerly anticipating the birth of a child for many years, were devastated. Their anger against Jayaynanda, whose negligence deprived them of a lively bouncing baby who would have so enriched their lives, was boundless. They looked upon him as a murderer, and Jayananda himself who was extremely fond of children, suffered in agony at the terrible outcome of the accident for which he was responsible. Witness as the story provides twist after twist, and one of the most exciting cinematic endings.

== Cast ==
- Tony Ranasinghe as Jayananda Ratnapala
- Nilmini Tennakoon as Veena Jayaweera
- Buddhika Jayaratne as Upendra
- Sanath Gunathilake as Asela
- Nisansala Jayatunga as Menuka 'Menu'
- Sriyani Amarasena as Nethalie
- Dayadeva Edirisinghe as Police Inspector
- Sarath Chandrasiri as Court bailiff
- Chitra Warakagoda as Veena's Amma
- Palitha Silva as Prosecutor
- Kingsley Loos as Defense attorney
- Keerthi Ranjith Peiris as Sub-Police Inspector
- Nethalie Nanayakkara as Upendra's mother
- Palitha Galappaththi as Reporter
- Dayaratne Siriwardena as Accident scene reprimander
- Umali Thilakarathne as Nethalie's servant
- Mihira Sirithilaka in a minor role. His maiden cinema appearance.
