= Kadira Divyaraja =

2023 film by Sunil Ariyaratne

- Kadira Divyaraja Theatrical release poster
- Sinhala: කදිර දිව්‍යරාජ
- Directed by: Sunil Ariyaratne
- Written by: Sunil Ariyaratne
- Produced by: Ravi Liyanage
- Starring: Sonakshi Rawat; Samar Vermani
- Cinematography: Channa Deshapriya
- Music by: Rohana Weerasinghe
- Release date: 3 August 2023 (Sri Lanka)
- Running time: 138 minitues
- Country: Sri Lanka
- Language: Sinhala
- Budget: LKR 200 million
- Box office: 2800 Lakhs

Kadira Divyaraja (Sinhala: කදිර දිව්‍යරාජ) is a 2023 Sri Lankan Sinhala language fantasy, romance film written and directed by professor Sunil Ariyaratne. This mythological film depicts the romantic relationship between Hindu god Kartikeya and the aboriginal princess Valli.

The film stars Indian actors Sonakshi Rawat as Valli and Samar Vermani as Kartikeya in the lead roles casting done by Indian casting director Himesh Choudhary. Supporting actors include Nadeepa Ranasinghe, Roshan Pilapitiya, Nilmini Tennakoon, Jagath Chamila, Wasantha Wittachchi, Dhananjaya Siriwardhana and Vinu Udani.

The filming of the movie took place at Ranmihithenna Telecinema Park, Sri Lanka. The film earned a record of 2800 lakh rupees within 100 days of screening.

== Plot ==
An adivasi couple named Suddhahami and Ukkuethani, who lived in the Kataragama area of Sri Lanka, meet a little girl in the forest one day and they feed her. Her name is Valli and as a young woman she creates an idol of a person she sees in her dreams and waits for his love.

At this time sage Narada comes to Kataragama. She learns from Narada that she is in love with Skanda Kumara, the son of Shiva Parvati who resides in the heavens, and that he is now married to the goddess Devyani. Later in heaven Skanda Kumara is told about Valli by sage Narada and he is worried about it. Devayani sees his anxiety and tells him to go to Kataragama to meet Valli and come back.

Skanda Kumara arrives at Kataragama where he meets King Dutugemunu who is about to go to war with King Elara and Prince Skanda blesses him to win the war. If the war is won, the king promises to build a temple.

Finally Lord Skanda Kumara meets Valli and the two get married and live happily ever after. During this season Devyani also comes to Ceylon as her lord did not return and she also befriends Valli and stays with them in Kataragama.

Later, King Dutugemunu wins the war and builds a temple for Lord Skanda Kumara and the film ends with Lord Skanda Kumara, Goddess Valli and Goddess Devyani entering the temple saying that they will help all who seek their help.

== Cast ==
- Samar Vermani as Kartikeya
- Sonakshi Rawath as Valli
- Nadeepa Ransinghe as Devayani
- Roshan Pilapitiya as Sudda Hami: Valli's father (adoptive father)
- Nilmini Tennakoon as Valli's adoptive mother
- Wasantha Wittachchi as Buddhist monk named Premananda
- Jagath Chamila as Narada Sage
- Vinu Udani Siriwardhana as Rati
- Charith Abeysinghe as King Dutugemunu
- Dhananjaya Siriwardena as Kamadeva
- Sampath Tennakoon as Brahma Dev
- Sarath Kothalawala as The person at the port
- Wasantha Kumaravila as Tharakasur
- Rangi Rajapaksha as Viharamahadevi
- Rajitha Rodrigo as King Kavanthissa

== Accolades ==
The film won the award for the Best Film at the 2023 Safal Fast Awards, Australia and won the Most Popular Film of the Year Award at the British Way Popular Awards 2023.
