= Madhumadhawa Aravinda =

Sri Lankan singer and actor

Madhumadhawa Aravinda මධුමාධව අරවින්ද
- Born: Gajanayake Arachchige Madhumadhawa Aravinda Siriwardana; 6 March 1973 (age 53); Kandy, Sri Lanka
- Occupations: Singer, songwriter, musician, actor, politician, journalist
- Spouses: Nilmini Tennakoon (m. 1996; div. 2000) Renusha (div. 2015) Niluka Boteju (m. 2019)
- Children: Shvetha Mandakini
- Father: Sunil Siriwardana
- Relatives: Dananjaya Siriwardana (brother); Chandrika Siriwardena (aunt); Anton Alwis (uncle)
- Musical career
- Genres: Pop; soul; rhythm and blues; Indian classical music
- Instrument: Vocals
- Years active: 1989–present
- Labels: Nilwala; MEntertainment

Gajanayake Arachchige Madhumadhawa Aravinda Siriwardana, (Sinhala: මධුමාධව අරවින්ද සිරිවර්ධන), better known as Madhumadhawa Aravinda, is a Sri Lankan singer, actor, journalist and a politician. He is also a past president of the Sri Lankan Singers Association.

== Personal life ==
Coming from a family of artists, Aravinda's father Sunil Siriwardana is a musician in Sri Lanka. His mother Susiri Siriwardena also a lyricist. His younger brother Dananjaya Siriwardana is also a popular actor in television and cinema. He was married to popular actress Nilmini Tennakoon, and they have one daughter Shvetha Mandakini Siriwardana. He met Nilmini during the teledrama Pini Bindu in 1992. They got married on 5 May 1996. They divorced in the early 2000s.

In 2011, Aravinda married a Muslim woman named Renusha. The wedding was celebrated on 14 February 2011 Pegasas Reef Hotel, Wattala. They divorced in late 2015 due to racial differences as said by him. In March 2019, he married Niluka Boteju, which is Aravinda's third marriage.

Aravinda's grandfather, Peter Siriwardena was an accomplished musician and an actor. He worked as a lecturer in music at the Government Women's Training College, Polgolla. Aravinda's grandmother Srimathi Karuna Devi was a music teacher as well as an actress.

Aravinda's aunt Chandrika Siriwardena is also a popular songstress and playback singer. She was married to Anton Alwis, who was a journalist as well as a lyricist. Anton died on 26 March 2018 at the age of 64. Chandrika's granddaughter Dulshara Dasanthi is also a singer.

== Politics ==
He is an active member of Pivithuru Helu Urumaya and served as a party councillor. He was elected to the Colombo Municipal Council and also contested the Western Provincial Council election under the United People's Freedom Alliance ticket, but failed to secure a seat. He is currently serving as one of chief organisers in the Colombo district.

In July 2014 the CID recorded a statement from Aravinda and questioned him over the unrest occurred in Aluthgama and Beruwala on 15 June.

In November 2019, Aravinda was filmed making a speech where he urged voters to support the SLPP candidate Gotabhaya Rajapaksa in the 2019 Sri Lankan presidential election if they wanted to stop Islamism from spreading.

== Discography ==
Aravinda commenced his singing career in 1990 along with his friend, Namal Udugama. He sang his first song in 1990 and the producer of that program was his father Sunil Siriwardana. Although he only recorded few handful of songs, when compared with his fellow musicians, songs such as Lamba Sawan and Sith Sith gain enormous popularity.

== Television ==
Aravinda, along with Suranga Lakmal Senevirathne had produced the television show, Kiyum Kerum, which was based on expressions, idioms, proverbs, imagery in Sinhala. He performed in season one of Sirasa Dancing Stars and Derana Star City. He also participated in Sirasa Superstar generation 4 as a judge.

== Single song tracks released ==
Solo Tracks
No.	Title	Length
1.	"Amma Sudui Appa Sudui" (Solo Track Version)
2.	"Badu Patawagena (Saroja)" (Solo Track Version)
3.	"Benthara Hamine Mage" (Solo Track Version)
4.	"Darani Thala Kampa Wuna" (Solo Track Version)
5.	"Dewa Dara Wruksha Chandra" (Solo Track Version)
6.	"Eaka Kode Chuniyam (duet with Malani Bulathsinhala)" (Solo Track Version)
7.	"Gaha Kola Kandu Mudune" (Solo Track Version)
8.	"Gee Gayana" (Solo Track Version)	03.39
9.	"Gelata Ea Ran (Amal Biso)" (Solo Track Version)
10.	"Hana Heeya Pana Handa" (Solo Track Version)
11.	"Harasara Bawata (Hena Gahalada Sihalunne)" (Solo Track Version)
12.	"Ira Iluk Mala" (Solo Track Version)
13.	"Kanda Dige Duwa Giyata (Dewathaviye)" (Solo Track Version)
14.	"Kiyambu Wel Lowe" (Solo Track Version)	04.14
15.	"Kowula Amathanu" (Solo Track Version)	03.31
16.	"Lamba Sawan Ran Patin" (Solo Track Version)	03.51
17.	"Mal Mandahasen Kiyuwe (duet with Jagath Wickramasinghe)" (Solo Track Version)	04.10
18.	"Me Wiyole Mihiri Nade" (Solo Track Version)
19.	"Muhuda Hadana Welawe" (Solo Track Version)	03.08
20.	"Nayan Ada Bandi Kolom Purawara" (Solo Track Version)
21.	"Nil Nethu Piya Sewane" (Solo Track Version)
22.	"Pahan Tharuwa Adaraye" (Solo Track Version)
23.	"Ran Kiren Thola Kata" (Solo Track Version)
24.	"Sadakalen Sada Kaleta (duet with Malani Bulathsinhala" (Solo Track Version)
25.	"Sihina Sayura" (Solo Track Version)
26.	"Sihinayak Sihiwee Sinasi" (Solo Track Version)
27.	"Sith Sith Sith Sith Sanasana (His first solo song)" (Solo Track Version)	03.42
28.	"Wana Peth Sisara" (Solo Track Version)
29.	"Wasana Pahan Niwa Dama" (Solo Track Version)

== Filmography ==
Aravinda acted few films in his career, though they are more notable. He played supporting roles in Siri Daladagamanaya and Aba.

- No. denotes the position of the film in the list of Sri Lankan movies in chronological order.

Year	No.	Film	Role	Ref.
2006	1064	Dedunu Wessa		
2008	1111	Aba	Ginikhandashiva	
2014	1203	Siri Daladagamanaya	Arahat monk	
