= Nikini Vassa =

- Film poster
- Sinhala: නිකිණි වැස්ස
- Directed by: Aruna Jayawardana
- Written by: Aruna Jayawardana
- Produced by: Dr.Kusumsiri De Silva
- Starring: Chandani Seneviratne; Jagath Manuwarna; Thumindu Dodantenna
- Cinematography: Channa Deshapriya
- Edited by: Jeewantha Dewapriya
- Music by: Nadeeka Guruge
- Production companies: Prasad Color Lab, Chennai
- Release date: May 22, 2013
- Running time: 102 minutes
- Country: Sri Lanka
- Language: Sinhala

Nikini Vassa (August Drizzle) (Sinhala: නිකිණි වැස්ස) is a 2013 Sri Lankan Sinhala drama film directed by Aruna Jayawardana and produced by Dr Kusumsiri De Silva. It stars Chandani Seneviratne and Jagath Manuwarna in lead roles along with Thumindu Dodantenna and Bimal Jayakodi. Music composed by Nadeeka Guruge. It is the 1190th Sri Lankan film in the Sinhala cinema. The film had positive reviews from international and local critics and won many international awards as well.

== Cast ==
- Chandani Seneviratne as Somalatha
- Thumindu Dodantenna
- Jagath Manuwarna
- Bimal Jayakody
- Kumara Thirimadura
- Sarath Kothalawala
- W. Jayasiri
- Sulochana Gamage
- Lakshman Mendis
- Wajira Kodithuwakku
- Daya Alwis
- G.R Perera
- Nethalie Nanayakkara

== Awards and Acclaims ==
- Derana Lux Film Awards 2011 - Best Upcoming director of the Year 2011 (Aruna Jayawardana)

LANKA LIVE FILM AWARDS 2014 BEST FILM BEST SCRIPT BEST ACTRESS BEST ACTOR BEST SUPPORTING ACTRESS BEST DIRECTOR BEST ART DIRECTOR BEST EDITOR BEST CINEMATOGRAPHER BEST MAKE UP

- Hiru Golden Film Awards 2014 - Popular Actor Nominations
- Hiru Golden Film Awards 2014 - Popular Actress Nominations
- Hiru Golden Film Awards 2014 - Best Film background Music (Nadeeka Guruge)
- Vessole Asian film festival – France – Best Asian Film Award – 2012
- Vessole Asian film festival – France – NETPAC Award – 2012
- Dubai International Film Festival – Jury's Special mention of the Best Actress Award – (Chandani Senevirathne) – 2012
- SIGNIS Asia Media Awards (SAMA) Silver Award - Chandani Seneviratne
- Represented of Singapore International Film Festival – 2012
- Represented of Busan International Film Festival – 2012
- Represented of Mumbai International Film Festival – 2012
- Represented of Kerala International Film Festival – 2012
