= Mother Lanka =

2025 Sri Lankan sports action film

- Sinhala: මදර් ලංකා
- Directed by: Anusha Sanjeewa Edirimuni
- Written by: Krishanthi Kulasuriya
- Story by: Krishanthi Kulasuriya
- Produced by: Ishan Perera
- Starring: Dhananjaya Siriwardena Tharindi Fernando Shenuki Dishalya Bimal Jayakodi Heshani Liyadipita
- Cinematography: Ranga S. Bandara
- Edited by: Infinity Cuts
- Music by: Eranga Jayawardena
- Production company: I.W Holdings
- Release date: 14 August 2025
- Running time: 150 minutes
- Language: Sinhala

Mother Lanka (Sinhala: මදර් ලංකා) is a 2025 Sri Lankan Sinhalese sports action film directed by Anusha Sanjeewa Edirimuni and produced by Ishan Perera for I.W Holdings. The film stars debutant Shenuki Disalya with and Tharindi Fernando, Dhananjaya Siriwardena in lead roles, where Bimal Jayakody, Sanath Gunathilake, Dilhani Ekanayake and Dharmapriya Dias made supportive roles.

== Plot ==
The story revolves around a single mother, Shalu, a former athlete whose young romance ends in heartbreak, leaving her to face life as a single mother. She struggles to raise her daughter, Emy, who is a badminton player, while confronting social expectations and personal sacrifice in contemporary Sri Lanka. Balancing the demands of motherhood with her own emotional challenges, she navigates a society that offers limited space for women who fall outside traditional norms.

The narrative intersects with the life of a transgender woman, Sathya whose experiences reveal the discrimination, resilience, and quiet courage of marginalized communities rarely represented in Sri Lankan cinema. She shares her courage and determination and joins with Shalu to raise her daughter, redefining the concept of motherhood. Through their intertwined journeys, the film explores themes of gender, love, and self-discovery, as well as the pressures faced by individuals pursuing personal goals, including involvement in sports.

== Cast ==
- Tharindi Fernando as Shalu
- Dhananjaya Siriwardena as Sathya
- Shenuki Disalya as Emy
- Bimal Jayakody
- Heshani Liyadipita
- Sanath Gunathilake
- Dilhani Ekanayake
- Dharmapriya Dias
- Sarath Kothalawala
- Chathuranga Kodithuwakku as Kavindu
- Kalana Gunasekara as coach
- Hiran Yattowita
- Madhini Malwattage
- Anura Bandara Rajaguru
- Nuwan Gunasekara
- Navindi Rapiel
- Wichintha Illangakoon
- Harshika Ratnayake
- Sudhiksha Samadhi
- Theshali Devmini
- Sarah Abeywardena
- Kusum Perera
- Nethuli Perera
- Metika Navik Senarath (child actor)

== Production ==
This is the maiden cinema direction by Anusha Sanjeewa Edirimuni, who worked as a program director, producer, and executive producer for 15 years since the founding years in Swarnavahini and EAP Film group. Story and screenplay of the film written by Krishanthi Kulasuriya and film is produced by Ishan Perera.

Cinematography and production design handled by Ranga S. Bandara, assistant direction by Niroshan Edirimanne and eiting by Infinity Cuts. Nayana Ujith is the makeup artist, Ananda Bandara is the color coordinator and Shasika Ruwan Marasinghe is the sound mixer. Art direction done by Vihanga Devwin, production management handled by Lak Ruwan Lokuhapuarachchi and hair styling by Santhush Nimesh.

Eranga Jayawardena is the Music director, where Abhisheka Wimalaweera made both song lyrics and background vocals.

== Release ==
The film was screened on World Mother's Day on 11 June 2025 at the Savoy 3C Cinema in Wellawatte at 10am. The media preview of the film was held at the Majestic City Cinema in Bambalapitiya in August 2025. The film was released on 14 August 2025 island wide. The film successfully passed 75 days of screening.
