= Nilukshi Fernando =

Sri Lankan teledrama actress

- Born: Rammuthuge Nilukshi Priyanthi Fernando; April 19, 1984 (age 42); Colombo, Sri Lanka
- Occupation: Actress
- Years active: 2005-Present

Nilukshi Fernando (born April 19, 1984) is a Sri Lankan actress. She made her debut as a teenager in Vasanthi Chathurani's Sadgunakaraya in 2007. She was crowned most upcoming actress for her performance in this teledrama, at the Rajya Sammana Ulela that year. Her most acclaimed role in the small screen was that of 'Sandesi' in 'Sanda' opposite Pathum Rukshan in 2013. She was crowned Raigam Best Actress Award for her performance in this teledrama, at the 10th Raigam Tele Award Festival that year.

== Selected television series ==
- Eran Landu
- Hiru Saduta Adarei
- Mini Mahima
- Pawena Yakada
- Sadgunakaraya
- Sanda
- Seya
- Sura Vimana
- Thawa Durai Jeewithe
- Visuviyas Kandu Pamula
- Warna
