= Nethalie Nanayakkara =

Sri Lankan actor and lyricist

Nethalie Nanayakkara නෙතලි නානායක්කාර
- Born: Nethalie Violet; 26 December 1934 (age 91); Kiribathgoda, Sri Lanka
- Education: Roman Catholic School, Pamunuvila; Gurukula Vidyalaya, Kelaniya
- Occupations: Actress, Dubbing artist
- Years active: 1955–present
- Spouse: Wally Nanayakkara
- Children: 5
- Awards: Kalabushana

Kalabushana Nethalie Violet Nanayakkara (born 26 December 1934 as නෙතලි නානායක්කාර) [Sinhala]), popularly known as Nethalie Nanayakkara, is a Sri Lankan actress. One of the earliest pillars in Sri Lankan television drama industry, Nanayakkara has been involved in more than 140 serials across a career spanning more than six decades.

== Personal life ==
Nanayakkara was born on 26 December 1934 in Kiribathgoda, Colombo as the fourth of the family. She has one elder brother and two elder sisters, where one sister died at small age. She also has two younger brothers. Her father worked at a private company. She started education from Roman Catholic School, Pamunuvila. She is fluent with English and passed the O/L examination at the age of 13. Then she attended to Gurukula Vidyalaya, Kelaniya and studied from English medium.

After the final exams at school, she joined to a private company under the guidance of his uncle. She worked in that company for two year and then resigned. Then she joined with Fordsroad Accounting Institute in Colombo as an auditor and worked for 30 years. She resigned from the job in 1985 to focus her career through cinema.

She married fellow actor Wally Nanayakkara at the age of 27. They were first met at Dalugama Catholic Church in Kelaniya in 1958. During his tenure at Lake House, Wally was also secretary of the Arts Circle. Wally Nanayakkara died on 11 October 2003 at the age of 64.

The couple has one son - Ravi - and four daughters - Renuka, Shamika and twins Chandika and Indika. Her son Ravi is a doctor in Surgery at General Hospital, Colombo and his wife Sagarika is the director of the Maharagama Cancer Hospital.

== Career ==
Nanayakkara has been worked in Radio Ceylon since 1955 in many radio plays. She was first involved in H. D. Wijedasa's radio production of Vihilu Thahalu. Her maiden radio play was Samudra Devi. She met his future husband during this period, where Wally joined the radio dramas in the 1960s. The couple first acted together in the 1962 radio play Muwan Palessa as "Ukku Banda" and "Binari".

She worked parallel in both drama as well as private company without any obstacle. Then she acted in a television serial directed by Ananda Sirisena. In 2000, she received the SIGNIS Award for the teledrama Asani Wasi.

She has worked as a dubbing artist for numerous international television serials.

=== Selected television serials ===
- Adaraneeya Chanchala
- Deweni Inima
- Diyaniyo
- Haara Kotiya
- Kolamba Ithaliya
- Koombiyo
- Sakala Guru 1 & 2
- Sakarma
- Pirinivan Kandu Pamula

== Filmography ==
Key
| † | Denotes films that have not yet been released |

| Year | Film | Role | Ref. |
|---|---|---|---|
| 2003 | Le Kiri Kandulu | Upendra's mother | |
| 2007 | Sankara | | |
| 2011 | King Hunther | | |
| 2011 | Gamani | Head Grama Arakshaka's mother | |
| 2013 | Nikini Vassa | | |
| 2016 | Ulath Ekai Pilath Ekai | | |
| 2016 | Motor Bicycle | Patta's mother | |
| 2017 | Aloko Udapadi | Elderly mother | |
| 2017 | Bandhanaya | Piyasili's granny | |
| 2017 | Heena Hoyana Samanallu | Tharaka's granny | |
| 2019 | Weli Pawuru | A helpless mother (Cameo) | |
| 2020 | The Newspaper | Guna's mother | |
| 2021 | Kawuruth Danne Na | | |
| 2023 | Gaadi | Ukkuwa's mother | |
| 2023 | Thattu Deke Iskole | | |
| 2024 | Pirimi Adarayak | | |
| 2025 | Kaasi Vaasi | | |
| 2026 | The Wife | | |
| TBA | Veera Kumari: Viharamaha Devi † | | |
| TBA | Rosa Kale Api Yan † | | |
| TBA | Pathikulaya † | | |
