= Sarath Kothalawala =

Sri Lankan dramatist

Sarath Kothalawala සරත් කොතලාවල
- Born: 1957 (age 68–69); Moratuwella
- Occupations: Actor, Director, Producer, Screen Play Writer
- Years active: 1991-Present
- Spouse: Pushpa Samanmali
- Children: Isuri Sandeepani; Isuru Manusha
- Awards: Best Actor; Best Screenwriter

Sarath Kothalawala is an actor, director, producer and a screenplay writer in Sri Lankan cinema. He, along with Kumara Thirimadura, won the Award for the Best Screenplay at Derana Lux Film Awards in 2014 for Thanha Rathi Ranga movie.

== Personal life ==
His father was a businessman and mother worked as a rubber collector in a rubber estate. He is married to Pushpa Samanmali, and they have one daughter Isuri Sandeepani and a son Isuru Manusha.

== Career ==
Kothalawala first appeared in Street theatre Diriya Kadella directed by Jayalal Rohana. While performed in the drama, he met Shelton Payagala, who was his teacher and guided him towards stage dramas and other theatre works, as he said. He took 15 years to study aspects of drama.

Kothalawala has acted in about 80 stage plays, where he also directed many stage plays. His most popular stage plays include Sookarayek Samaga, Nari Burathi 1, 2, Gabbara Minisa Gutikamata Niyamithai Mandela Mandela, Eaka Sakkuwe, Ko Kukko, Jayasirita Pissu and Charithe Horu Aran.

Kothalawala started his film career with Padadaya back in 1998, directed by Linton Semage. Through that, he performed many dramatic roles he is also performed some comedy roles as well. Apart from acting, he was the screenplay writer of film Thanha Rathi Ranga. The role in this film highly praised by the critics and was a commercial hit as well. His first cinema direction came through News Paper co-directed with Kumara Thirimadura was released on 29 June 2020.

== Awards ==
- Best Actor – Thanha Rathi Raga - 3rd Derana Lux Film Award - 2014
- Best Screenplay Writer – Thanha Rathi Raga - 3rd Derana Lux Film Award - 2014
- Best Actor – Thanha Rathi Raga - Hiru Golden Film Awards - 2016
- Jury Award - Grahambell Wath Sithuwada - Sumathi Awards - 2017
- Merit Award - Grahambell Wath Sithuwada - Raigam Tele'es - 2017

=== Selected television serials ===
- Ahas Ganga
- Ahas Gauwa
- Ahas Maliga
- Alu Baduna
- Awasarai Piyabanna
- Batti
- Baddata Saha Kuliyata
- Dawala Kadulla
- Gamane Yaa
- Ganga Laga Gedara
- Grahambell Wath Hithuwada
- Haras Para
- Ithin Ita Passe
- Kampitha Vil
- Kapa Nasna Samaya
- Kethumathi Neyo
- Konkala Doni
- Magema Doo
- Mama Saha Oba
- Manikkawatha
- Mati Kadulu
- Mini Kirana
- Monarathenna
- Muhudu Manali
- Piththala Konderuma
- Rana (Cameo appearance)
- Ranthaliya Walawwa
- Ridee Siththam
- Sanda Dev Diyani
- Sihini
- Siri Sirimal
- Theertha Tharanaya
- Vinividimi Adura
- Warna
- Wasuli Kanda
- Viyali
- Pirinivan Kandu Pamula

== Filmography ==
Key
†	Denotes films that have not yet been released

Year	Film	Role	Ref.
1999	Padadaya	Revolutionary Leader	
2002	Mage Wam Atha	Farook	
2003	Sonduru Dadabima	Chicken Inspector	
2003	Bheeshanaye Athuru Kathawak	Revolutionary Leader	
2004	Sumedha	Malcolm	
2005	Sudu Kalu Saha Alu	Gramasevaka	
2005	Samanala Thatu	Sex boy dealer	
2006	Ammawarune	Rogus	
2007	Sikuru Hathe	minor role	
2008	Machan	Muslim man	
2009	Dancing Star		
2009	Bindu	Minister	
2010	Tikiri Suwanda	Banda	
2011	Sinhawalokanaya	Tikka	
2011	Gamani	Ranasinghe's head officer	
2013	Bomba Saha Rosa	Silva	
2013	Nikini Vassa		
2014	Parawarthana	Kusum's father	
2014	Thanha Rathi Ranga	Sirithunga	
2014	Ko Mark No Mark	PM Gangodawila	
2014	Api Marenne Na	Vidyaratne	
2015	Bora Diya Pokuna		
2015	Sakkarang	Dingiri Banda	
2017	Ali Kathawa	Handuna veddah	
2017	28	Lenin	
2017	Dr. Nawariyan	Doctor Roshan	
2018	Kolomba Sanniya Returns	Andiris	
2018	Udumbara	Udumbara's father	
2020	The Newspaper	Guna	
2022	Hithumathe Jeewithe	Sira	
2023	Kadira Divyaraja	person at port	
2023	Deweni Yuddhaya	Mr. Panawenna	
2023	Rahas Kiyana Kandu		
2024	1970 Love Story	Saraa	
2024	Weerya	Weerya's threewheel friend	
2024	Sinhabahu		
2025	Kaasi Vaasi	Basunnehe	
2025	Ice Cream		
2025	Walampoori: Seven and Half Dreams	Nimalasiri	
2025	Mother Lanka		
2025	Elada Braa		
2025	Mr. Missis	Mudalali	
2026	Father	Desmond's father	
TBA	Sewanali †		
TBA	Amuthu Gurukamak †		
TBA	Amuthu 3k †		
TBA	Chandarege Wife †		
TBA	Rapist †		
