= Nilmini Tennakoon =

Sri Lankan actress (born 1965)

Nilmini Thennakoon
- නිල්මිණි තෙන්නකෝන්
- Born: January 23, 1965 (age 61); Moratuwa
- Education: Princess of Wales' College
- Occupation: Actress
- Years active: 1987–present
- Spouse: Madhumadhawa Aravinda (m. 1996; div. 2000)
- Children: Swetha Mandakini
- Awards: Best Actress; Most Popular Actress (12 awards); Best Supporting Actress

Thennakoon Pathiranalage Nilmini (born January 23, 1965, as නිල්මිණි තෙන්නකෝන්) [Sinhala]), popularly known as Nilmini Thennakoon, is an actress in Sri Lankan cinema and television. A highly versatile actress particularly active in television, she is a recipient of the Best Actress award multiple times in many local award festivals. She is often referred to as the "tear drop" of the Sinhala small screen, and also the Sri Lankan Madhuri Dixit.

== Personal life ==
She was born on 23 January 1965 to Piyadasa Thennakoon and Shriyani Thennakoon in Moratuwa. She has two siblings, one elder brother (L=the late Deleepa Thennakoon) and one younger sister. Her father was a businessman. He died when she was 13 years old. She completed her education from Princess of Wales' College.

Tennakoon was married to popular singer Madhumadhawa Aravinda, and they have one daughter, Swetha Mandakini. She met Madhumadhawa during the teledrama Pini Bindu in 1992. They got married on May 5, 1996. They divorced in the early 2000s.

In 2007, Tennakoon sustained grievous bodily injuries in a car accident and was taken to the Ragama hospital's ICU. The accident occurred at Balummahara on March 14 when she was rushing to Kurunegala from Colombo for a television filming event. Her car was reduced to matchwood although the chauffeur escaped with minor injuries.

== Career ==
In the 1980s, Tennakoon started to act on the school stage when she was in grade 7 and studied dancing under Vajira Chitrasena. Then she attended "Low Country" and Kandyan dancing under radio artist Chitra Kumari Kalubowila at Moratuwa. Under Chithra's guidance, she performed in the ballet Sasara staged in Rupavahini.

Tennakoon was introduced to the cinema by popular director Roy de Silva and actress Sumana Amarasinghe. She appeared in the film Hitha Honda Chandiya in a dancing scene with Bandu Samarasinghe. At the same time, D. B. Nihalsinghe used Thennakoon for his TV Commercials and then for the role "Amaravathi" in the play Dimithu Muthu and then in the 1991 film Keli Madala. Her major television acting came through Passe Gena Manamali, directed by Nalan Mendis. Then she acted in famous tele series Doo Daruwo which was telecast many years on the Rupavahini on Sundays at 8.30 p.m. Her character '"Deepthi" in the television serial Doo Daruwo was a major success in her career.

Her maiden cinematic experience came through the 1985 film Mawubima Naththam Maranaya, directed by Louie Vanderstraeten with a minor role. Her first major role in cinema came through the 1990 film Yukthiyata Wada directed by Sunil Soma Peiris. Some of her popular films are Keli Madala, Nagaran and Le Kiri Kandulu.

In 1992, Tennakoon won the Sarasaviya award for the Best Upcoming actress for her role in Suranimala. She won the Sarasaviya Award for the Best Actress for the role "Veena" in the film Le Kiri Kandulu. Then she won the Most Popular Teledrama Actress Award for a record six years continuously. In 2008 Raigam Tele'es, Tennakoon won the award for the Best Actress for the role "Tikiri Menika" in serials Handewa directed by Sherly P. Delankawala. In 2016, she won the Sumathi award for the Best Actress for the title role in Amma.

She participated in the reality program Hiru Mega Stars as the leader of the group "Shakyans". She also hosted the psychology television program Sith Giman Hala, telecast by TV Derana.

She currently has a beauty salon at Nugegoda.

=== Selected television serials ===
- 1990 Love Born in the Heart
- Abhisamaya as Anupama
- Adaraneeya Amma
- Akwessa
- Amma as Amma (Punna)
- Anduru Sewaneli
- Aswenna
- Blackmail
- Bodima as Nilmini
- Chess
- Daam
- Deveni Kamatha as Nirmala
- Dimuthu Muthu
- Diya Ginisilu
- Diya Sithuvam
- Diya Suliya as Sarojini Liyanaarachchi
- Diya Yata Gini
- Doo Daruwo as Deepthi
- Galaboda Hasthiya
- Ganaga Saha Nishshanka as Nadee
- Gimanata Pavana
- Giravi
- Girikula as Dingiri Amma
- Handewa as Tikiri Menika
- Himagira
- Hima Varusa
- Hiru Dahasak Yata
- Hiru Sadu Hamuwee
- Hiruta Muwawen
- Indikadolla
- Isi Daasi
- Isuru Pawura
- Iti Pahan as Some
- Kulavilokanaya as Pabasara Biso
- Kumarayaneni
- Mansala as Devi
- Maya Ranaga as Biula
- Mayavi
- Nethranjali as Nethra
- Nidi Kumari
- Nidikumba Mal
- Parami Pooja
- Pas Mal Pethi
- Passe Gena Manamali
- Pata Sarungal
- Pata Veeduru
- Pinketha as Giravi
- Piyabana Ashwaya
- Raena
- Ralla Weralata Adarei
- Ranagala Watta
- Sagaraya Parada
- Sanda Mediyama
- Sanda Pini Wassa as Maya
- Sasara Saranee
- Sikuru Awith
- Sikuru Evith
- Susima
- Thuru Kadauru
- Udawediya Mal
- Uththamavi
- Vishwanthari
- Visirunu Renu

== Filmography ==
Key
†	Denotes films that have not yet been released

Year	Film	Role	Ref.							
1985	Mawubima Naththam Maranaya									
1990	Yukthiyata Wada	Kunchu								
1990	Pem Rajadahana									
1991	Keli Madala	Sharika								
1992	Suraniamala									
1993	Wali Sulanga	Nilmini Ranasinghe								
1994	Ekada Wahi									
1995	Ayoma									
1999	Nagaran	Soma		2020	Sulnga Bara Wedi	2025	Gagana	2003	Le Kiri Kandulu	Veena Jayaweera
2016	Madhura Charika	Guest role								
2016	Hero Nero	Priya Senarathne								
2017	Bandhanaya	Nandawathi								
2019	President Super Star									
2023	Kadira Divyaraja									
2023	Thaththa	Ruwan's mother								
TBA	Akasa Palama †									
TBA	Sanda Dadayama †									
TBA	Man Hoyanne Premayak †									

== Awards ==
=== Sarasaviya Awards ===
Year	Nominee / work	Award	Result
1992	Suranimala	Best Upcoming Actress	Won
2003	Le Kiri Kandulu	Best Actress	Nominated

=== Sumathi Awards ===
Year	Nominee / work	Award	Result
2000	Isidasi	Best Actress	Won
1995	Peoples' Vote	Most Popular Actress	Won
2015	Girikula	Best Supporting Actress	Won
2016	Amma	Best Actress	Won

=== Raigam Tele'es ===
Year	Nominee / work	Award	Result
2009	Hendewa	Best Actress	Won
