= Aadara Hasuna =

1986 film directed by H.D. Premaratne

Aadara Hasuna ආදර හසුන
- Directed by: H.D. Premaratne
- Written by: H. D. Premaratne
- Starring: Joe Abeywickrama; Vasanthi Chathurani; Trilicia Gunawardena; Ravindra Randeniya
- Cinematography: Suminda Weerasinghe
- Edited by: Jayatissa Dillimuni
- Music by: Rohana Weerasinghe
- Release date: 13 December 1986
- Country: Sri Lanka
- Language: Sinhalese

Aadara Hasuna is a 1986 Sri Lankan thriller film directed by H.D. Premaratne.

== Plot ==
Anula (Vasanthi Chaturani) is a young wife of a retired army officer (Joe Abeywickrama). One day she receives a letter with a gift from a messenger (a street vendor) who claims he is asked to pass the gift and the letter to the beautiful lady in the house by an unidentified person whom Joe Abeywickrama suspects an adulterous partner of his young wife. Suspense-driven Joe questions his wife hard and his wife declares her innocence. But Joe divorces his wife. Vasanthi, in desperation tries to commit suicide but is saved by Andiris who later accompanies her to his house. On their Journey to Andiris' place, Vasanthi remembers her past when she meets Joe Abeywickrama after fleeing her village home in Thrikonamduwa, fearing LTTE terrorist attacks. Vasanthi's father and mother are killed by LTTE cadres. Joe Abeywickrama is a colonel stationed in Trikonamaduwa. In Andiris' fishing village, Chathurani meets a wealthy merchant, Gunapala who shows an interest in Chathurani. Chathurani marries Gunapala. Chathurani is conceived. One day, the messenger who carried gift and the letter identifies Gunapala as the secret person who gave them. Knowing the truth Chathurani leaves Gunapala. Gunapala reveals the truth to the messenger. He tells the messenger that he was an army soldier and had rescued Chathurani from LTTE terrorists when she was fleeing her village. Since that day, he had a huge crush on Chathurani, but unfortunately the colonel (Joe Abeywickrama) took her to his sister's place and married her. He then explains to the messenger that what he did was not wrong as he tried to win the heart of the woman he loves. The messenger accuses him of breaking apart an innocent family (Joe and Chathurani). He then asks how Chathurani became his wife and Gunapala explains that everything including Andiris' meeting with Chathurani is his plan. Then the messenger asks what will happen to them. Gunapala says he doesn't know whether Chathurani has left him. Then he accompanies the messenger to the station to check whether Chathurani has taken a train to Colombo. To his and the messenger's relief, Chathurani stands by the station. Gunapala reunites with Chathurani and the film ends with a scene in which they are seen smiling hugging each other lovingly.

== Cast ==
- Joe Abeywickrama as Col Serasinghe - Army officer
- Vasanthi Chathurani as Anula
- Trilicia Gunawardena as Army officer's sister
- Ravindra Randeniya as Gunapala
- Nawanandana Wijesinghe as Messenger
- Ruby de Mel as Karalina - wife of Andiris
- Vincent Vaas as Andiris
- Joe Dambulagala
- Miyuri Samarasinghe as Sisilin
- Kanthi Lanka
- Somasiri Colombage

== Songs ==
No.	Title	Singer(s)	Length
1.	"Sudu Mudu Rala Pela"	T.M. Jayarathne, Neela Wickramasinghe
2.	"Ran Dewolin Basa En Deiyo"	Ivor Dennis, Sunil Edirisinghe
