= Kalu Sudu Mal =

2002 film

Kalu Sudu Mal කළු සුදු මල්
- Directed by: Mohan Niyaz
- Written by: Mohan Niyaz
- Produced by: Cinemangani Films
- Starring: Kamal Addararachchi; Dilhani Ekanayake; Linton Semage
- Cinematography: K. D. Dayananda; Andrew Jayamanne
- Edited by: M. S. Aliman
- Music by: Sarath Wickrama
- Release date: 23 May 2002
- Running time: 120 minutes
- Country: Sri Lanka
- Language: Sinhala

Kalu Sudu Mal (Sinhala: කළු සුදු මල්) is a 2002 Sri Lankan Sinhala romantic drama film directed by Mohan Niyaz and produced by director himself with Amal Rodrigo for Cinemangani Films. It stars Kamal Addararachchi and Dilhani Ekanayake in lead roles along with Linton Semage and Yashoda Wimaladharma. Music is composed by Sarath Wickrama. The film was screened at Film Festivals at Australia and France as well. It is the 1165th Sri Lankan film in the Sinhala cinema.

Before screening in Sri Lanka, the film was screened in Paris and Australia in January 2001.

== Plot ==
Kalu Sudu Mal explores the social and emotional repercussions of caste-based discrimination and class struggle. The narrative follows the central protagonist, a young woman who navigates the rigid traditional expectations of her village while attempting to pursue personal autonomy and romance. It depicts the inevitable conflict between conservative elders and a younger generation seeking social mobility. The story culminates in a tragedy that illustrates the persistent "black and white" (symbolizing good and evil or rigid social divisions) nature of societal structures during the early 1980s.

== Cast ==
- Kamal Addararachchi as Ravindra Kumara alias Dilip
- Dilhani Ekanayake as Nirmala Mudunkotuwa alias Rohini
- Yashoda Wimaladharma as Mala
- Linton Semage as Chathura
- Veena Jayakody as Pushpa
- Tissa Udangamuwa
- Eardley Wedamuni as Detective head
- Senaka Wijesinghe as Detective assistant
- Sarath Namalgama
