= List of Sri Lankan composers =

This is a list of composers from Sri Lanka.

== A ==
- W. D. Amaradeva

== B ==
- Mohideen Baig

== D ==
- Lakshman Joseph de Saram

== E ==
- Tanya Ekanayaka

== F ==
- C. T. Fernando

== G ==
- Dilup Gabadamudalige
- Mohammed Gauss
- Rookantha Gunathilake
- Nadeeka Guruge

== I ==
- Iraj Weeraratne

== J ==
- Edward Jayakody
- Marcelline Jayakody
- Clarence Jey

== K ==
- Kasun Kalhara
- Gunadasa Kapuge
- Premasiri Khemadasa
- Gayathri Khemadasa

== M ==
- Nimal Mendis
- Miyuranga Wickramasinghe

== P ==
- Stanley Peiris

== R ==
- Lionel Ranwala

== S ==
- Ananda Samarakoon
- Sunil Santha
- Dinesh Subasinghe
- Priya Suriyasena

== W ==
- Rohana Weerasinghe
- Clarence Wijewardane
