= Padadaya =

Padadaya පාදඩයා
- Directed by: Linton Semage
- Written by: Linton Semage
- Produced by: Hiru Films
- Starring: Linton Semage; Shyamali Warusavitana; Saumya Liyanage
- Cinematography: Jayanath Gunawardena
- Edited by: Elmo Halliday
- Music by: Rohana Weerasinghe
- Release date: 12 March 1999
- Running time: 67 minutes
- Country: Sri Lanka
- Language: Sinhala

Padadaya (The Outcast) (Sinhala: පාදඩයා) is a 1999 Sri Lankan Sinhala drama film directed and produced by Linton Semage for Hiru Films. It stars Linton Semage and Shyamali Warusavitana in lead roles along with Saumya Liyanage and Trilicia Gunawardena. Music composed by Rohana Weerasinghe. It is the 911th Sri Lankan film in the Sinhala cinema. The film received mostly positive reviews from critics.

The film won a Special Jury Award Dhaka International Film Festival held on 28 January 2000.

== Cast ==
- Linton Semage as Dharmadasa
- Shyamalee Varusavithana
- Karu Gunaratne
- Trilicia Gunawardena
- Saumya Liyanage as Homeguard
- Hiru Gunawardhana
- Pradeep Jayathilake
- Sarath Kothalawala
- Lal Kularatne
- G.R Perera
- Thilak Ranasinghe

== Soundtrack ==
No.	Title	Singer(s)	Length
1.	"Nethin Netha Hamuwee"	Mohan Wickramasooriya
2.	"Me Sihine"	Mohan Wickramasooriya
