= Dhananjaya Siriwardena =

Sri Lankan actor and presenter

Dhananjaya Siriwardena ධනංජය සිරිවර්ධන
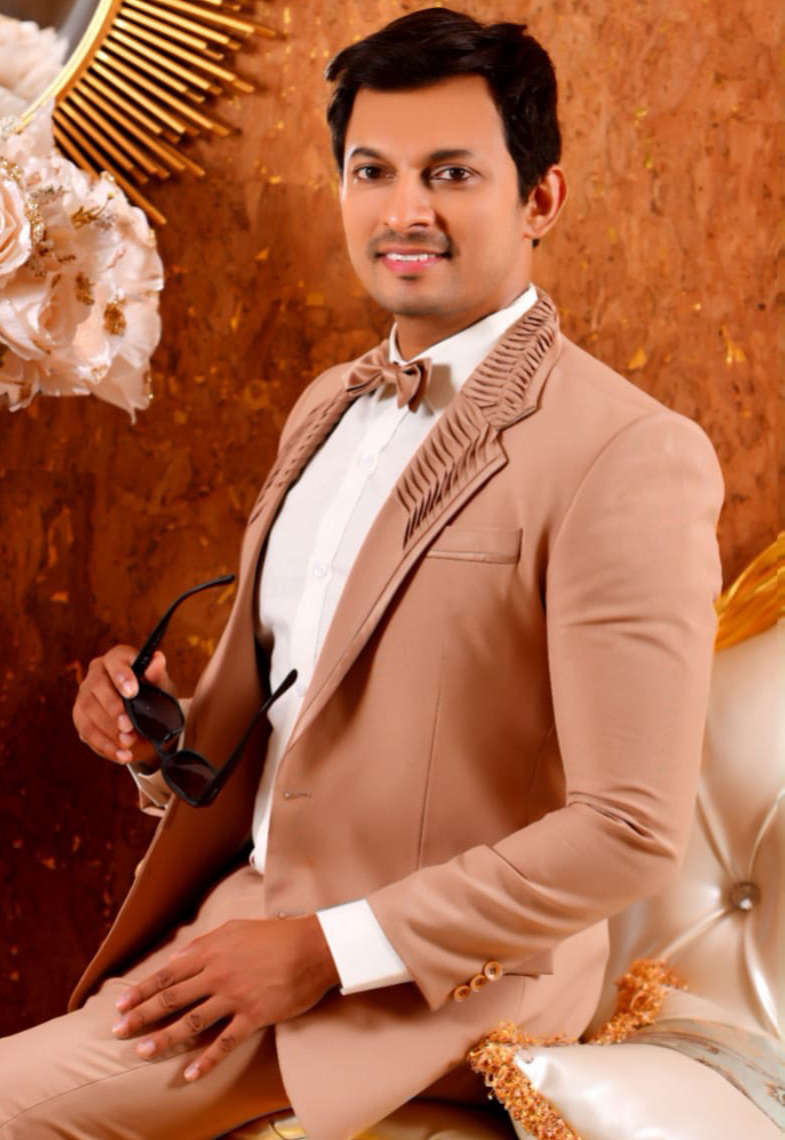
- Born: Gajanayake Arachchige Samuditha Dhananjaya Siriwardena; 7 May 1985 (age 41); Kandy, Sri Lanka
- Education: Ananda College
- Occupations: Actor, TV Host
- Years active: 2001–present
- Spouse: Shashini Siriwardena
- Children: 1
- Parents: Sunil Siriwardena (father); Susiri Siriwardena (mother)
- Relatives: Madhumadhawa Aravinda (brother); Chandrika Siriwardena (aunt); Anton Alwis (uncle)
- Awards: Best Actor; Best Upcoming Actor

Gajanayake Arachchige Samuditha Dhananjaya Siriwardena (Sinhala: ධනංජය සිරිවර්ධන), popularly known as Dhananjaya Siriwardena (born 7 May 1985), is an actor in Sri Lankan cinema, theater and television. He is also a television host.

== Personal life ==
His father Sunil Siriwardana is a musician and a renowned lyricist in Sri Lanka and mother Susiri Siriwardena is also a lyricist. His elder brother Madhumadhawa Aravinda is also a popular singer, actor as well as a politician.

Dhananjaya is married to Shashini. She is a flight attendant in Dubai. Dhananjaya first met Shashini in 2005 during a photo shoot of Indika Mallawaarachchi. The couple has one daughter Maurya Shiny, who was born on 1 July 2020.

Dhananjaya's grandfather, Peter Siriwardena was an accomplished musician and an actor. He worked as a lecturer in music at the Government Women's Training College, Polgolla. Dhananjaya's grandmother Srimathi Karuna Devi was a music teacher as well as an actress.

Dhananjaya's aunt Chandrika Siriwardena is also a popular songstress and playback singer. She was married to Anton Alwis, who was a journalist as well as a lyricist. Anton died on 26 March 2018 at the age of 64. Chandrika's granddaughter Dulshara Dasanthi is also a singer.

== Career ==
In 2004, he debuted as a mainstream actor in Me Paren Enna which was directed by Asoka Handagama and produced by YA TV. His performance in the drama was rewarded at the inaugural Raigam Tele'es ceremony in 2005, as the Best Actor. His maiden cinema acting came through Kumara Kanyawi directed by K. A. Wijeratne.

He conducts performing arts classes called Prana. In 2008, he acted in Sri Lanka's first Digital movie named Hetawath Mata Adaraya Karanna. The film was telecast on the Valentine's Day, February 14, 2008 through Citi Hitz Satellite movie channel of Dialog Television.

=== Selected television serials ===
- Adaraneeya Poornima
- Adariye
- Amaya
- Anantha
- Ayomi
- Chandi Kumarihami
- Gal Pilimaya Saha Bol Pilimaya
- Handuna Gaththoth Oba Ma
- Haras Paara
- Hiruta Pipena Suriyakantha
- Iragini Maddahana
- Jeewithaya Dakinna
- Laabai Apple
- Maada Eyama Wiya
- Mama Newei Mama
- Mayura Asapuwa
- Me Paren Enna
- Mila
- Millewa Walawwa
- Rathriyawee
- Potawetiya
- Ridi Duvili
- Sakura Mal
- Sanda Nodutu Sanda
- Sanda Pini Bideka
- Sanhinda Pamula
- Saranganaa
- Sath Rala Pela
- See Raja
- Senehasa Kaviyak
- Sillara Samanallu
- Sithaka Mahima
- Sudu Gindara
- Sujatha
- Thanamalvila Kollek
- Thunpath Ratawaka Lassana
- Veeduru Mal
- Wasuda

== Filmography ==
Key
†	Denotes films that have not yet been released

Year	Film	Roles	Ref.
2008	Hetawath Mata Adaraya Karanna		
2012	Kumari Kanyavi		
2016	Puthandiya	Kapila	
2017	Ali Kathawa	King	
2018	Aladin Saha Puduma Pahana	Aladin	
2020	The Horn	Prof. Thomas Steven	
2020	Rookada Panchi	Uncle	
2022	The Game		
2023	Kadira Divyaraja	Kamadeva	
2025	Mother Lanka	Sathya	
2026	Malaki Duwe Nubha	TV executive	
TBA	Number 9 †	Devinda	
TBA	Room No 106 †		
TBA	Sura Detuwo †		

== Awards and nominations ==
Year	Award	Award Festival	Result
2004	Best actor	Raigam Tele'es 2005	Won
2007	Rajya Sammana	Rajya Sammana 2007	Won
2010	Merit Award	Sumathi Awards 2010	Won
2010	Sumathi Jury Awards	Sumathi Awards 2010	Won
2012	Most popular Actor	Sumathi Awards 2012	Won
2022	Raigam Tele'es Special Jury Award	Raigam Tele'es 2022	Won
