= Thumindu Dodantenna =

Sri Lankan actor

- තුමිඳු දොඩන්තැන්න
- Born: Thumindu Kithsiri Mevan Dodantenna; Anuradhapura, Sri Lanka
- Education: Dharmapala Vidyalaya; University of Kelaniya
- Occupations: Lecturer; screenwriter; actor
- Years active: 2007–present
- Known for: Sankara (2007)
- Notable work: Jehan Fernando in Koombiyo
- Spouse: Kalani Dodantenna (2014–present)
- Children: 1
- Relatives: Asanka Dodantenna
- Awards: Most Popular Actor (2017); Best Actor (2019)

Thumindu Kithsiri Mevan Dodantenna, popularly known as Thumindu Dodantenna (තුමිඳු දොඩන්තැන්න) is an actor in Sri Lankan cinema, theater and television. He is also a lecturer and screenwriter by profession. He earned an M.A. in Drama and Theater from the University of Kelaniya, and currently lectures in the Department of Performing Arts at Sripalee Campus in Horana. Critics consider him one of the five actors who have dominated the Sri Lankan stage.

== Filmography ==
Dodantenna started his film career with Sankara in 2007, directed by Prasanna Jayakody. In the upcoming film "Nidahase Piya DS" he plays the lead role of young DS Senanayake.

Year	Film	Role	Ref.
2007	Sankara	Ananda, The Monk	
2012	Matha	Nimal	
2013	Nikini Vassa		
2014	Thanha Rathi Ranga	Actor	
2017	A Level	Nishshanka	
2018	Nela	Doctor	
2018	Vaishnavee	Osanda	
2018	Bimba Devi Alias Yashodhara	Poet	
2018	Nidahase Piya DS	Young DS Senanayake	
2019	U Turn	Adithya	
2019	Ayu		
2022	Night Rider		
2025	Walampoori: Seven and Half Dreams	Priyankara	

== Theater ==
- Ashawe Veedi Riya (translated and directed by Champa Buddhipala], "A Streetcar Named Desire" written by Tennessee Williams) role as "Mitch" (Harold Mitchell); performed in Melbourne & Sydney, Australia in October 2019
- Janelayen Paninnada – Danushika Nayana Kumari – Academic Players team – Script by Thumindu Dodantenna
- Dolahak – Athula Pathirana
- Adara Wasthuwa – Rajitha Dissanayake

== Television serials ==
Year	Teledrama	Roles	Ref.
2010	Pinibara Yamaya		
2017	Sahodarayo		
2017-18	Koombiyo	Jehan Fernando	

== Awards ==
- Raigam Tele'es Most Popular Actor Award of the year 2017.
- Signis Award for the Best Actor in 2019.
