= G. R. Perera =

Sri Lankan actor (1939–2023)

- ජී.ආර්. පෙරේරා
- Born: Galhenage Rathnapala Perera; 13 November 1939; Kirulapana, British Ceylon
- Died: 1 May 2023 (aged 83)
- Education: Kotahena Prince College, Colombo 13
- Occupations: Actor; dramatist
- Years active: 1961–2023
- Children: 3
- Awards: Raigam Award

Galhenage Rathnapala Perera (Sinhala: ජී.ආර්.පෙරේරා; 13 November 1939 – 1 May 2023) was an actor in Sri Lankan cinema, theatre and television. He acted in more than 600 television serials, with a career spanned over seven decades.

== Early life and education ==
Rathnapala Perera was born on 13 November 1939 in Kirulapana, British Ceylon, as the first child of the family. The family soon after moved to Egodawatta, Boralesgamuwa. His father was a businessman and a gambling addict, while his mother was a teacher. He received his education from Rattanapitiya Ananda Vidyalaya and Kotahena Prince College, Colombo 13. He had two younger brothers and one younger sister.

== Career ==
Perera was introduced to drama by his friend and dramatist Tissa Abeysekara. Abeysekara, along with Perera, Prema Ranjith Thilakaratna, Dharmasiri Wickramaratna, and Wickrama Bogoda formed a drama group Ape Kattiya led by dramatist Sugathapala de Silva. Perera acted in the group's stage drama Boarding Karayo. In 1962, he played a minor role in the stage play Ranthodu directed by Dharmasiri Wickramaratna. In 1963, he acted in Premaranjith Tilakaratne's debut play Waguru Bima. He had acted in seven stage plays.

His film career began with a minor role in the 1971 film Welikathara, directed by D.B. Nihalsinghe. His first major role came with his second film, Kalu Diya Dahara, directed by Manik Sandarasagara. His first television acting role was in the serial Thunkal Sihinaya, directed by Tissa Abeysekara. He portrayed numerous roles in multiple films, including the role of Malakada Bass in the serial Doo Daruwo, which was the turning point of his teledrama career, a doorway shooting victim in the film Gini Avi Saha Gini Keli, a village headman in the film Sooriya Arana, and Don Spater Senanayake in the 2018 film Nidahase Piya DS. He acted in six foreign films, which included three Indian, two American, and one German film.

=== Selected television serials ===
- Adaraneeya Poornima
- Adaraneeya Amma
- Amaya
- Ammai Thaththai
- Aparna
- Athuru Paara
- Bim Kaluwara
- Bodhi
- Bogala Sawundiris
- Chakraudhaya
- Damini
- Diyaniyo
- Dolosmahe Gangawa
- Ekamath Eka Rataka
- Eth Kanda Lihini
- Ganga Addara Kele
- Gangawa Tharanaya
- Handapana
- Heeye Manaya
- Indikadolla
- Isisara Isawwa
- Kadupul Mal
- Kammiththa
- Kapa Nasna Samaya
- Kasee Salu
- Katu Imbula
- Kombi
- Kula Kumariya
- Kulawamiya
- Mahagedara
- Mahathala Hatana
- Maheshika
- Maya Agni
- Mehew Rate
- Monara Kirilli
- Nilla Penena Manaya
- Ran Mehesi
- Sakki
- Sanda Hiru Tharu
- Sanda Maddahana
- Sanda Nodutu Sanda
- Sankuru Maruthaya
- Santhuwaranaya
- Sathyangana
- Sil
- Siri Sirimal
- Situwarayo
- Suddilage Kathawa
- Sudu Hamine
- Tharupaba
- Theth Saha Viyali
- Wanabime Sirakaruwo

== Personal life and death ==
Perera and his wife, a teledrama producer, had two daughters and one son. His youngest daughter, Yamuna Erandathi, is a teledrama actress and an honours graduate in Information Technology.

Perera died on 1 May 2023, at age 83.

== Filmography ==
Year	Film	Roles	Ref.
1971	Welikathara	Tarzan Kumara	
1980	Karumakkarayo	Siyadoris	
1987	Viragaya	Veddah Mudalali	
1998	Gini Avi Saha Gini Keli	Doorway shooting victim	
1999	Padadaya		
1999	Sathya Devi	Veda Mahaththaya	
2000	Sanda Yahanata	Farmer	
2001	Aswesuma	Arnolis	
2002	Parliament Jokes	Father of three sons	
2002	Sudu Sewaneli		
2002	Surapurata Kanyaviyak		
2003	Sonduru Dadabima	Kamal's father	
2003	Bheeshanaye Athuru Kathawak		
2004	Sooriya Arana	Village headman	
2004	Rajjumala		
2004	Randiya Dahara	Loan agent	
2006	Anjalika		
2008	Super Star		
2008	Sandalu Thalen Eha		
2010	Kawulu Dora		
2010	Kshema Bhoomi	Ralahamy	
2011	Sinhawalokanaya	Veda Mahaththaya	
2011	Mahindagamanaya	Chapman of King's House	
2012	Midnight's Children	Astrologer	
2013	Nikini Vassa		
2014	Siri Daladagamanaya		
2014	Anagarika Dharmapala Srimathano	Manamperi	
2015	Maharaja Ajasath	Mahamathya	
2018	Nidahase Piya DS	Don Spater Senanayake	
TBD	Kondadeniye Hamuduruwo		
TBD	Suvisi Vivarana		

== Awards ==
In 1980, he won a film critics' award for his role in the movie Karumakkarayo. In 2007, he won the award for Best Supporting Actor for his role in the teleplay Chakrayudaya. He was awarded the Raigam Award for acting in the most number of teledramas.
