= Linton Semage =

Sri Lankan actor and a movie director (born 1957)

Linton Semage ලින්ටන් සේමගේ
- Born: 1957 (age 68–69); Boossa, Sri Lanka
- Education: Deva Pathiraja College; Galle Central School
- Occupations: Actor, director
- Years active: 1976–2006
- Awards: Best Actor

Linton Semage is an actor in Sri Lankan cinema, theatre and television as well a filmmaker. He is best known for his roles in movies such as Padadaya (1998), Sulang Kirilli (2002) and Mad Cowgirl (2006). He started his acting career in 1978 from the movie Sara, which was directed by T. Arjuna. He won the Sarasaviya Best Actor Award (1995) and Presidential Film Award (1999) for the best actor, for his role in movie Mee Haraka.

== Personal life ==
He was born in 1957 in Boossa, Galle. He completed education from Deva Pathiraja College and Galle Central School.

== Career ==
In 1975, he moved Colombo with the ambition to be a dancer. Then he joined "Ranga Shilpa Shalika" in Lionel Wendt and started dancing under the guidance of Basil Mihiripenna. He then acted in Chithrasena's Karadiya, Dhamma Jagoda's Kora Saha Andaya and Wes Muhunu. He is one of the earliest member of street drama group formed by Gamini Haththotuwegama. His maiden television acting came through Sekkuwa directed by Parakrama Niriella with the role "Kiripussa". He won the excellence award at State Drama Festivals for that role. He continued to act in many popular critically acclaimed stage drama such as Maname, Sinhabahu, Wedikkarayo, Ran Salakuna, Punthila, Pansa Deke Hansaya, Ath and Mora.

He produced the play Panchayudha, which is his only stage production. He went India for a drama course at Indian National Drama Theater. In 1978, he played his maiden cinema acting through Saara directed by T. Arjuna with the role as a waiter. He acted in short films such as Palamuwaniya Saha Anthimaya by Niriella and Cindrellage Sereppuwa by P.U.D Perera. His most notable cinema acting came through 1994 film Mee Haraka directed by I.N Hewawasam. In that year, he won the Sarasaviya award for the Best Actor for his role Gunapala in that film.

He acted in few television serials, including, Nadee Geethaya, Irata Handana Mal, Indrakeelaya, Kokila Ginna, Magul Sakwala and Iti Pahan. He also produced two serials Akaradaruwa and Deweni Kameththa.

== Filmography ==
=== Main Actor / Actor ===
- No. denotes the Number of Sri Lankan film in the Sri Lankan cinema.

Year	No.	Film	Role
1978	396	Sara	Waiter
1981	502	Sudda	
1982	514	Thani Tharuwa	
1985	614	Rajina	Also as screenwriter
1986	639	Athuru Mithuru	
1987	658	Podi Vijay	
1989	696	Siri Medura	Gunapala's supporter
1990	705	Saharawe Sihinaya	
1991	737	Sthree	
1994	819	Mee Haraka	Gunapala
1995	842	Ayoma	
1996	866	Bawa Sasara	
1997	868	Yasoma	
1998	901	Anthima Reya	
1998	967	Purahanda Kaluwara	Sunanda's husband
1999	911	Padadaya	Dharmadasa. Also as screenwriter
1999	928	Nagaran	Berty
2000	938	Rajya Sevaya Pinisai	Wijepala
2000	945	Indrakeelaya	
2001	961	Me Mage Sandai	
2002	978	Kalu Sudu Mal	Chathura
2002	980	Sudu Sewaneli	Sudu Banda
2002	988	Mage Wam Atha	Kamal. Also as screenwriter
2003	1018	Sulang Kirilli	Shantha Bandara
2004	1041	Mille Soya	
2006	English	Mad Cowgirl	Dr. Suzuki

=== Director ===
- 1999 Paadadaya
- 2002 Mage Wam Atha

=== Producer ===
- 1999 Paadadaya

== Awards ==
- Presidential Film Awards

1999 - Best Actor (Mee Haraka)

2002 - Best Supporting Actor (Sudu Sevaneli)

- Sarasaviya Awards

1995 - Best Actor (Mee Haraka)

- Dhaka International Film Festival

2000 Best Film - Padadaya (The Outcast)

2000 Best Director - Padadaya (The Outcast)

== See also ==
- Cinema of Sri Lanka
