= Thanha Rathi Ranga =

- Sinhala: තන්හා රතී රඟා
- Directed by: Nilendra Deshapriya
- Written by: Kumara Thirimadura; Sarath Kothalawala
- Produced by: H D Premasiri; Sunil T Fernando
- Starring: Sarath Kothalawala; Kumara Thirimadura; Namal Jayasinghe
- Cinematography: Danushka Gunathilake
- Music by: Anupama Khemadasa; Gayathri Khemadasa
- Release date: 17 October 2014
- Running time: 95 minutes
- Country: Sri Lanka
- Languages: Sinhala; Tamil

Thanha Rathi Ranga (Between Yesterday and Tomorrow) (Sinhala: තණ්හා රතී රඟා) is a 2014 Sri Lankan Sinhala drama thriller film directed by Nilendra Deshapriya, in his directorial debut, and produced by Sunil T. Fernando for Sunil T. Films.

It was written by Sarath Kothalawala and Kumara Thirimadura and features themselves in lead roles with Namal Jayasinghe. The film also supported by many veteran artists like Swarna Mallawarachchi, Anoja Weerasinghe, Neeta Fernando and Kamal Addararachchi. It is the 1113rd Sri Lankan film in the Sinhala cinema.

The film was an official entry at the Julien Dubuque International Film Festival in the United States.

== Plot ==
This story revolves around three friends, Sirithunga (Sarath Kothalawala) a handyman and father of three young children, Wimal (Kumara Thirimadura) a three-wheeler driver, and Suraj (Namal Jayasinghe) an overly sensitive university student. The three friends decide following the end of the Sri Lankan Civil War to take a road trip, to areas where the final battles were fought. They each dream of a better life, a future with freedom, love and money.

== Cast ==
- Kumara Thirimadura as Wimal
- Sarath Kothalawala as Sirithunga
- Namal Jayasinghe as Suraj
- Vishwajith Gunasekara as Wimal's Uncle
- Sulochana Weerasinghe as Jacintha
- Kamal Addararachchi as Chandare
- Adam Adamlly as Peter
- Swarna Mallawarachchi as Manorani
- Anoja Weerasinghe as Wimal's Mother
- Nita Fernando as Chandare's Mother
- Sarath Chandrasiri
- Priyantha Sirikumara

== Awards ==
2015 SIGNIS Film Awards

- Creative Direction Silver Award - Nilendra Deshapriya

2016 Derana Sunsilk Film Awards

- 'Best Film' - Nilendra Deshapriya.
- 'Best Actor' - Sarath Kothalawala.
- 'Best Screenplay' - Sarath Kothalawala, Kumara Thirimadura.
- 'Best Cinematography' - Dhanushka Gunathilake.
- 'Best Editing' - Ravindra Guruge
- 'Best Costumes' - Methnuwan Wijesinghe, Niluka Vanigaratne.
- 'Best Supporting Actress' - Sulochana Weerasinghe.
- 'Best Makeup' - Narada Thotagamuwa.
- 'Best Original Music Score' - Gayathri Khemadasa, Anupama Khemadasa

== Box office ==
The film easily passed 50 days of screening.
