= Koombiyo =

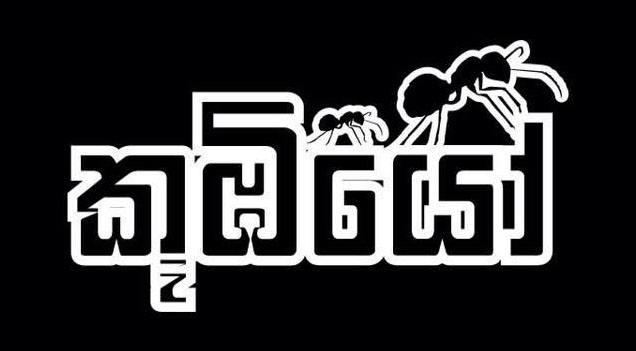
- Genre: Political thriller
- Written by: Lakmal Darmarathna; Damitha Chandrasiri
- Directed by: Lakmal Darmarathna
- Starring: Thumindu Dodantenna; Kalana Gunasekara; Yureni Noshika
- Composer: Achala Solomons
- Country of origin: Sri Lanka
- Original language: Sinhala
- No. of seasons: 1
- No. of episodes: 57

Production
- Producer: Asanka Dodantenna
- Editor: Damitha Chandrasiri
- Running time: 17 minutes

Original release
- Network: ITN
- Release: August 26, 2017 – March 17, 2018

Koombiyo (English: Ants, සිංහල: 'කූඹියෝ') is a 2017 Sri Lankan crime political thriller series created by Lakmal Darmarathna and Damitha Chandrasiri. The show premiered on ITN on 26 August 2017 with 30 minutes episodes airing on Saturday and Sunday at 08:00 pm weekly. The final episode aired on 17 March 2018.

A second series is in development.

== Plot ==
Koombiyo tells the story of Jehan Fernando, who has neither a family nor home and lives alone in an abandoned building complex in Colombo. He accidentally meets Hiruni and Priyantha Mahaulpathagama in a public bus when Priyantha is coming to Colombo on his search for a job. Jehan convinces Priyantha to abandon the job he is going for and join Jehan's company Purchasing Lanka instead, which delivers retail items to customers claiming they are from supermarkets when in reality they are bought from the local flea markets. Priyantha starts living with Jehan while being a partner in his business and they quickly become good friends. The company is eventually busted by government officers after a complaint from a disgruntled customer, who happens to be one of Jehan's former batchmates. The case is settled by Anjana and both Jehan and Priyantha are then released without charges.

Afterwards, they start a motivational magazine using copied material from other sources, but the attempt to sell the magazine with the help of unemployed street gang led by Jude in public buses fails after a fight between Jude and a bus conductor where they end up in jail.

A local gangster named Austin and his right-hand henchman Tiran come to meet Jehan to offer him a job to steal an expensive motor car from a wealthy businessman. It is revealed that Jehan is not an average scammer but a well respected criminal mastermind who has a reputation for planning and executing heists. Austin and Tiran are close allies of Jehan and they seem to have worked together in the past. After successfully stealing the car as planned, another client approaches Jehan through the recommendation of Austin to stop a journalist from exposing a popular politician's dirty past. Jehan finds that the journalist is waiting for his housing loan to be passed and in exploiting this, he persuades the journalist to bribe a fake bank officer (another one of Jehan's contacts). The whole act is recorded secretly and Jehan uses this to convince the journalist to do as he says.

Meanwhile, Jehan meets Hiruni again several times and they start building a friendly relationship. A strange boy begins stalking Hiruni asking her love and when he meets Hiruni and Jehan in public, a tense situation arises and ends up with Jehan being attacked by the boy's gang. Badly injured, Jehan is hospitalized and the situation makes both Hiruni and Jehan closer together.

A team of union leaders from a left-wing political party approaches Jehan to reveal that the previous attack on him is not a random event, but a clever plan to avenge Jehan's earlier plan to blackmail their friend Padmakumara. They were impressed with his work and offer him a job to cause havoc inside a factory named Shakya Holdings which treats the employees well but doesn't allow any trade unions inside their factory. Jehan sends Priyantha as an employee to the factory to find any loophole which can be used to break the relationship between the owners and the employees. Meanwhile, a CID officer named Cyril Abeysekara came to meet Jeahan to question him about a bank robbery happened 6 years ago. Police suspects that Austin is behind the robbery and Jehan is seen in a cafe near the crime scene. Jehan managed to dodge the questions cleverly with Cyril unable to find any clear evidence to link him to the robbery.

Jehan along with his friend who is a computer hacker creates a software which predicts "lives ambitions". And with the help of Hiruni manages to sell to a company.

Jehan successfully executes his master plan and causes the employees to go on a strike, however, Priyantha is imprisoned during the protest and an employee is shot and killed. Upon realization of their involvement in the death, Jehan leaves to a remote village school seemingly to escape from his criminal ways. He teaches science and English students while in there. Priyantha gets brainwashed by the party officials. and they manage to get him out through legally procedures. He becomes very famous. Jehan tries to talk to Priyantha when he is in prison but Priyantha now is too brainwashed by the party officials to talk to Jehan.

Austin gets killed by his enemy "Barrel Sunil".Tiran flees the country to Malaysia. CID officer ASP abeysekera arrest Jehan.

In the meantime, Priyantha competes in the local government polls. He also finds out that Jehan had told his computer friend to give a share of the profits made from the software to Priyantha. Even a party official tells Priyantha Jehan really cared for him. Priyantha then goes to meet Jehan who is now in prison and gets a bit of advice about how to win the polls.. Priyantha wins the polls. And after 2 years Jehan is released from prison.

Priyantha meets Jehan after 2 years and gives him refuge in his home. Priyantha is getting a bit disillusioned by his party officials. Priyantha finds Jehan a job and Jehan realises that even priyantha now is a bit corrupt. After an argument between them, Jehan tries to leave priyantha but priyantha brings him back home. Tiran returns to Sri Lanka illegally and threatens Jehan to help him get his revenge for Austins death.

== Cast ==
=== Main ===
- Thumindu Dodantenna as Jehan Fernando / Jayalath Aarachchilage Don Susantha Sagara Chandrasiri
- Kalana Gunasekara as Priyantha Mahaulpathagama
- Yureni Noshika as Hiruni Jayawardena

=== Supporting ===
- Senaka Titus Anthony as Austin
- Andrew Pulle as Tiran
- Jagath Manuwarna as Jude

=== Recurring ===
- Sujeewa Dias as Anjana
- Peter D'Almeida as Opposition Leader Dudley Maldeniya
- Dharmapriya Dias as Padmakumara Kasthuri
- Parakrama Jayasingha as Senadhi Thennakon
- W. Jayasiri as Adhikari (Opposition leader Maldeniya's Secretary)
- Lakshman Mendis as Dissanayake
- Maureen Charuni
- Ramani Siriwardena
- Vishwajith Gunesekara as ASP Cyril Abeysekara
- Udara Abeysundara as Meesha
- Bandula Sooriyabandara as Shakya Jayawardana
- Thusitha Laknath as Gune
- Buddhika Jayaratne as Saliya
- Nishantha Priyadarshana as MP Ananda Pathirana
- Nethalie Nanayakkara as Priyantha's Grandmother
- Thilanga Deshapriya
- Sadda Uthpala Kandage as Anthony
- Danushka Jayarathna
- Ramya Wanigasekara as Priyantha's Mother
- Kalani Dodantenna as Woman at house

== Production ==
The initial production started in 2012 and the shooting completed in 2015. However, the drama was rejected by many local television networks because the protagonist of the drama is a con-man. Ultimately after requesting for the second time, ITN agreed to telecast the drama in 2017.

== Reception ==
By October, 2017 Koombiyo became the highest rated crime television drama on IMDb database receiving a score of 9.9/10 in which resulted by majority voting 10/10. This Sri Lankan series has ranked first by placing the internationally acclaimed crime TV series Breaking Bad and The Wire in the fourth and sixth places, respectively, on the IMDb platform.

== Original soundtrack ==
=== Theme song ===
(Released on myTube September 21, 2017)

No.	Title	Music	Artist	Length
1.	"පායනා කාලේදී රෑ දවල් මහන්සි වී කන්න දේ රැස් කරයි කූඹියෝ..."	Achala Solomons	Achala Solomons	03:19
