= Gayathri Khemadasa =

Sri Lanken composer (born 1976)

- Born: 1976 (age 49–50); Colombo, Sri Lanka
- Education: Ladies College, Colombo, Prague Conservatory, Masaryk University
- Occupations: Composer, pianist
- Father: Premasiri Khemadasa
- Awards: Fulbright Professional Scholarship (2011)

Gayathri Khemadasa is a Sri Lankan composer and contemporary classical pianist.

== Biography ==
Born in 1976 in Colombo, she is the daughter of Premasiri Khemadasa. She was educated at Ladies College, Colombo and studied music at the Prague Conservatory and Masaryk University, Czech Republic. She began performing in public in 2005, in order to raise money for the victims of the 2004 Asian tsunami. In 2011, she was awarded a Fulbright Professional Scholarship and became a visiting scholar at Wesleyan University where she began writing an opera on Phoolan Devi. In 2015, at the Derana Film Awards, Khemadasa became the first Sri Lankan woman to win a national award for Best Original Score with the film Thanha Rathi Ranga. The following year, she won the award for Best Music Director at the Hiru Golden Film Award for the same film. In 2022, at the Ceylon International Film Festival in California, She became the first Sri Lankan to win an international award for Best Music with the film The Newspaper. Two more additional awards followed in November 2023 at the Presidential Film Awards where she won Best Song Melody and Best Music Director.
