= 19th Presidential Awards =

- Date: July 29, 2019
- Site: Nelum Pokuna Mahinda Rajapaksa Theatre, Colombo 07, Sri Lanka
- Produced by: Sri Lanka Film Corporation

Highlights
- Most awards: 2016 – Let Her Cry (6); 2017 – 28 (7); 2018 – Davena Wihagun (7)

The 19th Presidential Film Awards festival (Sinhala: 19 වැනි ජනාධිපති සම්මාන උලෙළ), presented by the Sri Lanka Film Corporation with the collaboration of the Presidential Secretariat and the Ministry of Parliamentary Reforms and Mass Media, was held on July 29, 1996, at the Nelum Pokuna Mahinda Rajapaksa Theatre, Colombo 07, Sri Lanka. His Excellency The President Maithripala Sirisena was the chief guest at the awards night.

Around 96 Awards were presented to 27 artists who excelled in 79 films in Sinhala cinema screened from 2016 to 2018 (Twenty five films screened in 2016, twenty six films screened in 2017 and twenty eight films in 2018). Meanwhile, 11 recipients won the Pioneer Awards, Swarnasinghe Awards and Vishwa Keerthi Awards. The Swarnasinghe Lifetime Award was presented by President to veteran artists Ravindra Randeniya, Nita Fernando and Sugathapala Senarath Yapa. Meanwhile, Anoma Janadari and film director Sanjeewa Pushpakumara received the Vishwa Keerthi Award from the President for their acting talent. Purogami Awards were won by Shanthi Abeysekera, Anton Gregory, K.D. Dayananda, Swarna Kahawita, Sunil Soma Peiris and Alexander Fernando.

== 2016 Awards ==
Category	Film	Recipient
Best Film	Let Her Cry	Asoka Jagath Wijenayake
Best Direction	Let Her Cry	Asoka Handagama
Best Script	Sayapethi Kusuma	Visakesa Chandrasekaram
Best Actor	Motor Bicycle	Dasun Pathirana
Best Actress	Let Her Cry	Swarna Mallawarachchi
Best Supporting Actor	Adaraneeya Kathawak	Bimal Jayakody
Best Supporting Actress	Motor Bicycle	Veena Jayakody
Best Supporting Actress	Paththini	Aruni Rajapaksha
Best Cinematographer	Let Her Cry	Channa Deshapriya
Best Lyricist	Sayapethi Kusuma	Visakesa Chandrasekaram
Best Music Director	Sakkarang	Nadeeka Guruge
Best Song	Motor Bicycle	Ajith Kumarasiri
Best Playback Singer	Let Her Cry	Chitral Somapala
Best Playback Singer	Motor Bicycle	Ajith Kumarasiri
Best Playback Songstress	Paththini	Nirosha Virajini
Best Playback Songstress	Sarigama	Uresha Ravihari
Best Editor	Let Her Cry	Ravindra Guruge
Best Sound Designer	Maya 3D	Pravin Jayaratne
Best Art Director	Sakkarang	Lal Harindranath
Best Make-up Artist	Maya 3D	Nalin Premarthilake
Best Actor in a Comedy Role	Maya 3D	Pubudu Chathuranga
Best Upcoming Actor	Sayapethi Kusuma	Jehan Sri Kanth
Best Film	Sayapethi Kusuma	Yashoda Rasanduni
Maximum Audience Response	Paththini	
Special Jury Awards	Paththini (costumes)	Venuka Wickramaarchchi
Special Jury Awards	Paththini (choreography)	Chandana Wickramasinghe
Special Jury Awards	Motor Bicycle (acting)	Samanalee Fonseka
Merit Awards	Sakkarang (acting)	Thusitha Laknath
Merit Awards	Motor Bicycle (acting)	Kalana Kusalatha
Merit Awards	Sakkarang (acting)	Prasadini Atapattu
Merit Awards	Adaraneeya Kathawak (cinematography)	Ruwan Costa

== 2017 Awards ==
Category	Film	Recipient
Best Film	28	Rashitha Jinasena
Best Direction	28	Prasanna Jayakody
Best Script	28	Prasanna Jayakody
Best Actor	28	Mahendra Perera
Best Actress	28	Semini Iddamalgoda
Best Supporting Actor	Sulanga Gini Aran	Roshan Ravindra
Best Supporting Actress	Swaroopa	Nita Fernando
Best Cinematographer	Nimnayaka Hudekalawa	Channa Deshapriya
Best Lyricist	Kaala	Raji Wasantha Welgama
Best Music Director	Aloko Udapadi	Milinda Tennekoon
Best Song	Kaala	Darshana Ruwan Dissanayake
Best Playback Singer	Kaala	Thusith Simpson
Best Playback Songstress	Nino Live	Umali Thilakarathne
Best Editor	28	Rangana Sinharage
Best Sound Designer	Aloko Udapadi	Sasika Ruwan Marasinghe
Best Art Director	28	Nuwan Sanuranga
Best Make-up Artist	Swaroopa	Ranjith Manthagaweera
Best Actor in a Comedy Role	Paha Samath	Giriraj Kaushalya
Best Actor in a Comedy Role	Paha Samath	Priyantha Seneviratne
Best Upcoming Actor	Aloko Udapadi	Shammu Kasun
Best Upcoming Actress	Nino Live	Yureni Noshika
Maximum Audience Response	Dharmayuddhaya	
Special Jury Awards	A Level (acting)	Jayalath Manoratne
Special Jury Awards	Aloko Udapadi (acting)	Darshan Dharmaraj
Special Jury Awards	Aloko Udapadi (acting)	Chathra Weeraman
Merit Awards	A Level (acting)	Sachira Weerasinghe
Merit Awards	Kaala (singing)	Himasha Manupriya
Merit Awards	Swaroopa (acting)	Rini de Silva
Certificates of Jury Assessment	Kaala (acting)	Chalesha Charunethra
Certificates of Jury Assessment	Dharmayuddhaya (acting)	Vinumi Vinsadi
Certificates of Jury Assessment	Paha Samath (acting)	Sharad Chanduma
Certificates of Jury Assessment	Paha Samath (acting)	Sejan Hansaka
Certificates of Jury Assessment	Paha Samath (acting)	Kivindi Kasundara
Certificates of Jury Assessment	Paha Samath (acting)	Amiru Koralage

== 2018 Awards ==
Category	Film	Recipient
Best Film	Davena Wihagun	Sanjeewa Pushpakumara
Best Direction	Davena Wihagun	Sanjeewa Pushpakumara
Best Script	Davena Wihagun	Sanjeewa Pushpakumara
Best Actor	Davena Wihagun	Mahendra Perera
Best Actress	Davena Wihagun	Anoma Janadari
Best Supporting Actor	Nidahase Piya DS	Poojitha de Mel
Best Supporting Actress	Davena Wihagun	Samanalee Fonseka
Best Cinematographer	Vaishnavee	Nimal Mendis
Best Lyricist	Sarungal	Achala Soloman
Best Music Director	According to Matthew	Chandana Jayasinghe
Best Song	Sarungal	Ranga Dassanayake
Best Playback Singer	Gharasarapa	Bachi Susan
Best Playback Songstress	Gharasarapa	Samitha Mudunkotuwa
Best Editor	Komaali Kings	Anjelo Jones
Best Sound Designer	Nidahase Piya DS	Pravin Jayaratne
Best Art Director	Komaali Kings	Dasun Ravinath
Best Make-up Artist	Vaishnavee	Ebert Wijesinghe
Best Make-up Artist	Vaishnavee	Ranjith Manthagaweera
Best Actor in a Comedy Role	Komaali Kings	Raja Ganesan
Best Upcoming Actor	Gharasarapa	Devnaka Porage
Best Upcoming Actress	Gharasarapa	Kavindya Adhikari
Maximum Audience Response	Bimba Devi Alias Yashodhara	
Special Jury Awards	Salei Pukkal (acting)	Sri Niroshan
Special Jury Awards	Salei Pukkal (acting)	Sudharshan Rutnam
Special Jury Awards	Goal (acting)	David Karunaratne
Merit Awards	Sarungal (acting)	Chamathka Lakmini
Merit Awards	Goal (acting)	Nayana Darshani Perera

Next edition was held in 2023 at 20th Presidential Awards
