= Presidential Film Awards =

Sri Lankan Film Award Ceremony

- Current: 20th Presidential Awards
- Awarded for: Excellence in Cinematic Achievements
- Country: Sri Lanka
- Presented by: Current President of Sri Lanka
- First award: 1979
- Final award: 26 July 2019
- Website: http://www.nfc.gov.lk/presidentioal_awards.php

Presidential Film Awards is a film award ceremony held in Sri Lanka. It is organized by the National Film Corporation along with the Presidential Secretariat and the Ministry of Cultural Affairs. It was 1st awards in 1979 by President J. R. Jayewardene, and continue till 2004. The awards were not held from 2005 to 2014 when Mahinda Rajapakse was president. The award started to be presented again in 2015 by President Maithripala Sirisena, and last awarded by President Ranil Wickramasinghe in 2023.

== President awarding J. R. Jayewardene ==
=== 1979 Winners ===
- Best Film: Bambaru Avith - Thilak Godamanna
- Best Direction: Bambaru Avith - Dharmasena Pathiraja, Ahasin Polawata - Lester James Peries
- Best Actor: Ahasin Polawata - Tony Ranasinghe
- Best Actress: Bambaru Avith - Malini Fonseka
- Best Script Writer: Ahasin Polawata - Tissa Abeysekara
- Best Cinematographer: Ahasin Polawata - Donald Karunarathna
- Best Editor: Ahasin Polawata - Sumitra Peries
- Best Music Director: Bambaru Avith - Premasiri Kemadasa
- Best Art Director: Veera Puran Appu - Hemapala Dharmasena
- Best Sound Director: Veera Puran Appu - Mical Sathyanadan
- Best Supporting Actor: Veera Puran Appu - Tissa Abeysekara
- Best Supporting Actress: Sasara - Shanthi Lekha
- Best Lyrics Writer: Bambaru Avith - W. Jayasiri ("Udumbara Hinehenawa" - "Adaraye Oba Obamai")
- Best Playback Singer Male: Janaka Saha Manju - T. M. Jayaratne (" Ko Ma Pethu Obe Adare")
- Best Playback Singer Female: Ahasin Polawata - Rukmani Devi ("Doi Doi")
- Merit Awards: Bambaru Avith - Ruby de Mel, Bambaru Avith - Cyril Wickramage, Gehenu Lamai - Shyama Ananda, Gehenu Lamai - M. S. Ananda, Gehenu Lamai - Chitra Wakishta, Bambaru Avith - Dharmasena Pathiraja, Janaka Saha Manju - Upali Aththanayaka, Ahasin Polawata - Relex Ranasingha, Hitha Mithura - Sriyani Amarasena, Gehenu Lamai - Vasanthi Chathurani, Gehenu Lamai - Victor Rathnayake, Bambaru Avith - Sextas Aponsu, Bambaru Evith - Joe Abeywickrama

=== 1980 Winners ===
- Best Film: Palagetiyo - Vasantha Obeysekera
- Best Direction: Palagetiyo - Vasantha Obeysekera
- Best Actor: Sarungale - Gamini Fonseka
- Best Actress: Wasanthaye Dawasak - Malini Fonseka
- Best Script Writer: Palagetiyo - Vasantha Obeysekera
- Best Cinematographer: Wasanthaye Dawasak - Sumiththa Amarasingha
- Best Editor: Podi Malli - Jayathissa Dillimuni
- Best Music Director: Wasanthaye Dawasak - Premasiri Kemadasa
- Best Art Director: Wasanthaye Dawasak - Hemapala Dharmasena
- Best Sound Director: Palagetiyo - Jorge Manathunge
- Best Supporting Actor: Wasanthaye Dawasak - Joe Abeywickrama
- Best Supporting Actress: Wasanthaye Dawasak - Somalatha Subasinghe
- Best Lyrics Writer: Wasanthaye Dawasak - "Dedunnen Ena" - Ajantha Ranasinghe
- Best Playback Singer Male: Wasanthaye Dawasak - "Mala Gira" - T. M. Jayaratne
- Best Playback Singer Female: Monarathenna - "Handa Haaun Hande" - Nanda Malini
- Special Jury Award: Handaya - Titus Thotawatte
- Merit Awards: Palagetiyo - Andrew Jayamanne (Cinematographer), Palagetiyo - Denawaka Hamine (Acting), Palagetiyo - Vijaya Kumaratunga (Acting), Palagetiyo - Dharmasiri Bandaranayake (Acting), Sarungale - Fareena Lai (Acting), Sarungale - Wimal Kumara de Costa (Acting), Sarungale - Sriyani Amarasena (Acting), Podi Malli - Ravindra Randeniya (Acting),

=== 1981 Winners ===
- Best Film: Ganga Addara - Milina Sumathipala, Siribo Aiya - Ranjith Palansuriya / Jinadasa Palansuriya / Dharmpriya Palansuriya.
- Best Direction: Ganga Addara - Sumitra Peries, Siribo Aiya - Sunil Ariyaratne
- Best Actor: Siribo Aiya - Joe Abeywickrama
- Best Actress: Ganga Addara - Vasanthi Chathurani
- Best Script Writer: Ganga Addara - Tissa Abeysekara
- Best Cinematographer: Ganga Addara - Donald Karunarathna (color), Hansa Vilak - Andrew Jayamanne (Black & White)
- Best Editor: Ganga Addara - Sumitra Peries
- Best Music Director: Siribo Aiya - Victor Rathnayake
- Best Art Director: Ganga Addara - Hemapala Dharmasena
- Best Sound Director: Hansa Vilak - Lionel Gunarathna
- Best Makeup Artist: Parithyaga - Ebert Wijesinghe
- Best Supporting Actor: Uthumaneni - Somy Rathnayake
- Best Supporting Actress: Raththaththin Raththame - Geetha Kumarasinghe
- Best Lyrics Writer: Ganga Addara - "Ganga Addara Ma" / "Ran Tikiri Sina" - Augustus Vinayagarathnam
- Best Playback Singer Male: Siribo Aiya - "Kavi" - W. D. Amaradeva
- Best Playback Singer Female: Siribo Aiya - "Kavi" - Nanda Malini
- Merit Awards: Karumakkarayo - Upali Athtanayaka, Hansa Vilak - Dharmasiri Bandaranayake, Hansa Vilak - Swarna Mallawarachchi, Siribo Aiya - Somasiri Denipitiya, Uthumaneni - Farina Lai, Miurige Kathawa - Veena Jayakody, Parithyaga - Amarasiri Kalansuriya, Ganga Addara - Tony Ranasinghe

=== 1982 Winners ===
- Best Film: Beddegama - Wilfred Perera
- Best Direction: Soldadu Unnehe - Dharmasena Pathiraja
- Best Actor: Beddegama - Joe Abeywickrama
- Best Actress: Aradhana - Malini Fonseka
- Best Script Writer: Soldadu Unnehe - Dharmasena Pathiraja / W. Jayasiri
- Best Cinematographer: Aradhana - Sumiththa Amarasingha (Color), Soldadu Unnehe - Jayanath Gunawardana (Black & White)
- Best Editor: Beddegama - Gladvin Fernando
- Best Music Director: Soldadu Unnehe - Premasiri Khemadasa
- Best Art Director: Thawalama - Hemapala Dharmasena
- Best Sound Director: Sathara Pera Nimithi - K. Balasubramaniyam
- Best Makeup Artist: Beddegama - Ebert Wijesinghe
- Best Supporting Actor: Beddegama - Henry Jayasena
- Best Supporting Actress: Beddegama - Nadeeka Gunasekara
- Best Lyrics Writer: Banduru Mal - " Bawen Bawe Yana Gamane " - Pof. Sunil Ariyaratne
- Best Playback Singer Male: Sathara Pera Nimithi - "Buddan Saranan Gachchami" - T. M. Jayaratne
- Best Playback Singer Female: Sathara Pera Nimithi - "Gee Pothe Gee Thanu Visiri" - Nanda Malini
- Swarna Singhe Awards: Sir Lester James Peries
- Merit Awards: Sathara Pera Nimithi - Pof. Sunil Ariyaratne (Lyrics), Beddegama - Willie Blake (Cinematographer), Sathara Diganthaya - Wimal Kumara de Costa (Acting), Bandura Mal - Veena Jayakody (Acting), Bandura Mal - Dharma Sri Munasinghe (Acting), Thawalama - Farina Lai (Acting), Beddegama - Tony Ranasinghe (Acting), Sathweni Dawasa - Ravindra Ranasinghe (Acting), Sagarayak Meda - Iranganie Serasinghe (Acting), Anjana - Freddie Silva (Acting)

=== 1983 Winners ===
- Best Film: Maha Gedara - Chandrasiri Ganegoda
- Best Direction: Yahalu Yeheli - Sumitra Peries
- Best Actor: Malata Noena Bambaru - Joe Abeywickrama
- Best Actress: Re Manamali - Veena Jayakody
- Best Script Writer: Maha Gedara - Tissa Abeysekara
- Best Cinematographer: Yahalu Yeheli - Donald Karunarathna (Color), Malata Noena Bambaru - Donald Karunarathna (Black & white)
- Best Editor: Malata Noena Bambaru - Lal Piyasena
- Best Music Director: Yahalu Yeheli - Nimal Mendis
- Best Art Director: Yahalu Yeheli - Hemapala Thale
- Best Sound Director: Malata Noena Bambaru - Michael Sathyanadan
- Best Makeup Artist: Kele Mal - Derric Frenando
- Best Supporting Actor: Adishtana - J. H. Jayawardana
- Best Supporting Actress: Maha Gedara - Geetha Kumarasinghe
- Best Lyrics Writer: Redi Nimnaya - "Sulaga Waga Evidin" - Bandara K. Wijethunga
- Best Playback Singer Male: Adishtana - Sunil Edirisinghe
- Best Playback Singer Female: Yasa Isuru - "Ammawarune" - Nanda Malini
- Merit Awards: Maha Gedara - Tissa Abeysekara (Acting), Maha Gedara - Sriyani Amarasena (Acting), Maha Gedara - Dhamma Jagoda (Acting), Biththi Hathara - Neel Alas (Acting), Yahalu Yeheli - Nadeeka Gunasekara (Acting), Maha Gedara - Tissa Abeysekara (Acting), Ridee Nimnaya - Swarna Mallawarachchi (Acting), Ridee Nimnaya - Shanthi Lekha (Acting), Paramitha - Tony Ranasinghe (Acting), Paramitha - Ravindra Randeniya (Acting), Kele Mal - Wijeratne Warakagoda (Acting)

=== 1984 Winners ===
- Best Film Dadayama - Rabin Chandrasiri / Sunil Chandrasiri / P. A. Somapala
- Best Direction Dadayama - Vasantha Obeysekera
- Best Actor Dadayama - Ravindra Randeniya
- Best Actress Dadayama - Swarna Mallawarachchi
- Best Script Writer Dadayama - Vasantha Obeysekera / Christy Shelton Fernando / K. L. De Silva
- Best Cinematographer Dadayama - Donald Karunarathna (Color), Thunweni Yamaya - Andrew Jayamanna (Black & White)
- Best Editor Dadayama - Stanly de Alwis
- Best Music Director Muhudu Lihini - H. M. Jayawardena
- Best Art Director Kaliyugaya - Eral Keli
- Best Sound Director Dadayama - K. P. K Balasingham
- Best Makeup Artist Muhudu Lihini - Ranjith Mathakaweera
- Best Supporting Actor Dadayama - Somy Rathnayake
- Best Supporting Actress Kaliyugaya - Trilicia Gunawardena
- Best Lyrics Writer Muhudu Lihini - "Sithija Ime Sidu Gembure" - Ajantha Ranasinghe
- Best Playback Singer Male Muhudu Lihini - "Sithija Ime Sidu Gembure" - W. D. Amaradeva
- Best Playback Singer Female Siwuraga Sena - "Wessa Wete Midule" - Nanda Malini
- Swarna Singhe Awards K. A. W. Perera
- Merit Awards Muhudu Lihini - Aruna Shanthi (Acting), Muhudu Lihini - Anoja Weerasinghe (Acting), Muhudu Lihini - Robin Fernando (Acting), Muhudu Lihini - D. B. Nihalsinghe (Cinematographer-Color), Dadayama - Rathnawali Kekunawela (Acting), Dadayama - Iranganie Serasinghe (Acting), Thunweni Yamaya - Wasantha Kotuwella (Acting), Thunweni Yamaya - Indira Johanclass (Acting), Pasamithuro - Alexander Fernando (Acting), Pasamithuro - Mervyn Jayathunga (Acting), Kaliyugaya - Punya Heendeniya (Acting)

=== 1985 Winners ===
- Best Film: Arunata Pera - Ananda Gunasekara
- Best Direction: Arunata Pera - Amaranath Jayathilaka
- Best Actor: Arunata Pera - Wijeratne Warakagoda
- Best Actress: Arunata Pera - Chandi Rasika
- Best Script Writer: Arunata Pera - Amaranath Jayathilaka / Kumara Karunarathna
- Best Cinematographer: Maya - Donald Karunarathna (Color), Arunata Pera - Duminda Weerasinghe (Black & White)
- Best Editor: Arunata Pera - Elmo Halliday
- Best Music Director: Arunata Pera - W. B. Makuloluwa
- Best Art Director: HimaKathara - Eral Keli
- Best Sound Director: HimaKathara - Shesha Palihakkara
- Best Makeup Artist: Maya - K. P. K. Balasingham
- Best Supporting Actor: HimaKathara - Sathischandra Edirisinghe
- Best Supporting Actress: Sathi Pooja - Chandani Seneviratne
- Best Lyrics Writer: HimaKathara - "Kanda Eha" - Augustus Vinayagarathnam
- Best Playback Singer Male: HimaKathara - "Kanda Eha" - Ivor Dennis
- Best Playback Singer Female: No Award
- Merit Awards: Himakathara - Dharmasiri Wickramarathna (Directing), Himakathara - Iranganie Serasinghe (Acting), Arunata Pera - Denawaka Hamine (Acting), Adara Geethaya - Douglas Ranasinghe (Acting), Adara Geethaya - Sabeetha Perera (Acting), Hithawathiya - Anoja Weerasinghe (Acting), Sathi Pooja - Suvineetha Weerasinghe (Acting), Deweni Gamana - Gamini Wijesooriya (Acting), Parasathuro - Sarath Dassanayake (Music)

== President awarding - Chandrika Kumaratunga ==
=== 2004 Winners ===
- Best Film - Mille Soya
- Best Director - Boodee Keerthisena (Mille Soya)
- Best Actor - Jackson Anthony (Sooriya Arana)
- Best Actress - Geetha Kumarasinghe (Randiya Dahara)
- Best Playback Singer (Female)- Deepika Priyadarshani (Aadaraneeya Wassaanaya)
- Best Playback Singer (Male)- Harshana Dissanayake (Sooriya Arana)
- Best Make-up Artist - Ebert Wijesinghe (Sooriya Arana)
- Best Art Direction - Chandragupta Thenuwara (Mille Soya)
- Best Sound Direction - Shyaman Premasundara (Sooriya Arana)
- Best Supporting Actress - Grace Ariyawimal (Gini Kirilli)
- Best Supporting Actor - Mahendra Perera (Randiya Dahara)
- Best Editor - Ravindra Guruge (Mille Soya)
- Best Camera Direction - Channa Deshapriya (Sooriya Arana)
- Best Music Direction - Navaratne Gamage (Aadaraneeya Wassaanaya)
- Best Script - Somaratne Dissanayake (Sooriya Arana)
- Best Composer- Somaratne Dissanayake (Sooriya Arana)
- Best Upcoming Actor - Roshan Ravindra (Aadaraneeya Wassaanaya)
- Best Upcoming Actress -Chathurika Peiris (Aadaraneeya Wassaanaya)
- Best Popular Movie - Renuka Balasooriya (Sooriya Arana)
- Pioneer Awards - Shelton Premaratne, G. D. L. Perera, Udula Dabare, Anula Karunathilaka
- Vishva Keerthi Awards - Bennett Rathnayake, Asoka Handagama, Nithyavani Kandasamy, Anoma Janadari, Inoka Sathyangani, Damitha Abeyratne, Prasanna Vithanage, Nimmi Harasgama
- Swarne Singhe Awards - Tony Ranasinghe, D. B. Nihalsinghe, Iranganie Serasinghe, Premasiri Khemadasa
- Special Award: Vimukthi Jayasundara

== President awarding - Maithripala Sirisena ==
=== 2015 Winners ===
- Best Film: Mohomad Adom Ali (Oba Nathuwa Oba Ekka)
- Best Direction: Prasanna Vithanage (Oba Nethuwa Oba Ekka)
- Best Actor: Shyam Fernando (Oba Nethuwa Oba Ekka)
- Best Actress: Anjali Patail (Oba Nethuwa Oba Ekka)
- Best Script Writer: Prasanna Vithanage (Oba Nethuwa Oba Ekka)
- Best Cinematographer: Channa Deshapriya (Address Na)
- Best Editor: Sheker Prasad (Oba Nethuwa Oba Ekka)
- Best Music Director: Lakshman Joseph de Saram (Oba Nethuwa Oba Ekka)
- Best Film Song: Dinesh Subasinghe (Ho Gana Pokuna)
- Best Art Director: Manjula Ayagama (Ho Gana Pokuna)
- Best Sound Director: Thapas Nayak (Oba Nethuwa Oba Ekka)
- Best Makeup Artist: Harsha Manjula (Address Ne)
- Best Supporting Actor: Jayalath Manoratne (Ho Gana Pokuna)
- Best Supporting Actress: Damitha Abeyratne (Address Ne)
- Best Lyrics Writer: Pallegama Hemarathana Thero (Maharaja Gemunu)
- Best Playback Singer Male: Amila Perera (Sinahawa Atharin)
- Best Playback Singer Female: Nirosha Virajini (Sinahawa Atharin)
- Special Jury Award: Kaushalya Fernando
- Swarna Singhe Awards: Nanda Malini, Vasantha Obeysekera, Swarna Mallawarachchi, Donald Karunarathna, Dharmasiri Bandaranayake, Anoja Weerasinghe
- Merit Awards: Dinakshie Priyasad (Me Wage Adarayak), Senith Sathwiru Walpitagamage (Ho Gana Pokuna), Sathsara Sawan Jayasooriya (Ho Gana Pokuna), Senitha Dinith Gunasinhe (Ho Gana Pokuna), Nethpriya Madhubhashitha Ranawakarachchige (Ho Gana Pokuna), Thishakya Sankalana Kumarathunga (Ho Gana Pokuna)
- Pioneer Awards: Tissa Liyanasooriya, Athor U. Amarasena, K. P. K Balasingham, Derrik Pranandu, A. D Ranjith Kumara, Prof. Sunil Ariyaratne, Chandra Kaluarachchi, Sunil Mihindukula, Gamini Weragama

=== 2016 Winners ===
Category	Film	Recipient
Best Film	Let Her Cry	Asoka Jagath Wijenayake
Best Direction	Let Her Cry	Asoka Handagama
Best Script	Sayapethi Kusuma	Visakesa Chandrasekaram
Best Actor	Motor Bicycle	Dasun Pathirana
Best Actress	Let Her Cry	Swarna Mallawarachchi
Best Supporting Actor	Adaraneeya Kathawak	Bimal Jayakody
Best Supporting Actress	Motor Bicycle	Veena Jayakody
Best Supporting Actress	Paththini	Aruni Rajapaksha
Best Cinematographer	Let Her Cry	Channa Deshapriya
Best Lyricist	Sayapethi Kusuma	Visakesa Chandrasekaram
Best Music Director	Sakkarang	Nadeeka Guruge
Best Song	Motor Bicycle	Ajith Kumarasiri
Best Playback Singer	Let Her Cry	Chitral Somapala
Best Playback Singer	Motor Bicycle	Ajith Kumarasiri
Best Playback Songstress	Paththini	Nirosha Virajini
Best Playback Songstress	Sarigama	Uresha Ravihari
Best Editor	Let Her Cry	Ravindra Guruge
Best Sound Designer	Maya 3D	Pravin Jayaratne
Best Art Director	Sakkarang	Lal Harindranath
Best Make-up Artist	Maya 3D	Nalin Premarthilake
Best Actor in a Comedy Role	Maya 3D	Pubudu Chathuranga
Best Upcoming Actor	Sayapethi Kusuma	Jehan Sri Kanth
Best Film	Sayapethi Kusuma	Yashoda Rasanduni
Maximum Audience Response	Paththini	
Special Jury Awards	Paththini (costumes)	Venuka Wickramaarachchi
Special Jury Awards	Paththini (choreography)	Chandana Wickramasinghe
Special Jury Awards	Motor Bicycle (acting)	Samanalee Fonseka
Merit Awards	Sakkarang (acting)	Thusitha Laknath
Merit Awards	Motor Bicycle (acting)	Kalana Kusalatha
Merit Awards	Sakkarang (acting)	Prasadini Atapattu
Merit Awards	Adaraneeya Kathawak (cinematography)	Ruwan Costa

=== 2017 Winners ===
Category	Film	Recipient
Best Film	28	Rashitha Jinasena
Best Direction	28	Prasanna Jayakody
Best Script	28	Prasanna Jayakody
Best Actor	28	Mahendra Perera
Best Actress	28	Semini Iddamalgoda
Best Supporting Actor	Sulanga Gini Aran	Roshan Ravindra
Best Supporting Actress	Swaroopa	Nita Fernando
Best Cinematographer	Nimnayaka Hudekalawa	Channa Deshapriya
Best Lyricist	Kaala	Raji Wasantha Welgama
Best Music Director	Aloko Udapadi	Milinda Tennekoon
Best Song	Kaala	Darshana Ruwan Dissanayake
Best Playback Singer	Kaala	Thusith Simpson
Best Playback Songstress	Nino Live	Umali Thilakarathne
Best Editor	28	Rangana Sinharage
Best Sound Designer	Aloko Udapadi	Sasika Ruwan Marasinghe
Best Art Director	28	Nuwan Sanuranga
Best Make-up Artist	Swaroopa	Ranjith Manthagaweera
Best Actor in a Comedy Role	Paha Samath	Giriraj Kaushalya
Best Actor in a Comedy Role	Paha Samath	Priyantha Seneviratne
Best Upcoming Actor	Aloko Udapadi	Shammu Kasun
Best Upcoming Actress	Nino Live	Yureni Noshika
Maximum Audience Response	Dharmayuddhaya	
Special Jury Awards	A Level (acting)	Jayalath Manoratne
Special Jury Awards	Aloko Udapadi (acting)	Darshan Dharmaraj
Special Jury Awards	Aloko Udapadi (acting)	Chathra Weeraman
Merit Awards	A Level (acting)	Sachira Weerasinghe
Merit Awards	Kaala (singing)	Himasha Manupriya
Merit Awards	Swaroopa (acting)	Rini de Silva
Certificates of Jury Assessment	Kaala (acting)	Chalesha Charunethra
Certificates of Jury Assessment	Dharmayuddhaya (acting)	Vinumi Vinsadi
Certificates of Jury Assessment	Paha Samath (acting)	Sharad Chanduma
Certificates of Jury Assessment	Paha Samath (acting)	Sejan Hansaka
Certificates of Jury Assessment	Paha Samath (acting)	Kivindi Kasundara
Certificates of Jury Assessment	Paha Samath (acting)	Amiru Koralage

=== 2018 Winners ===
Category	Film	Recipient
Best Film	Davena Wihagun	Sanjeewa Pushpakumara
Best Direction	Davena Wihagun	Sanjeewa Pushpakumara
Best Script	Davena Wihagun	Sanjeewa Pushpakumara
Best Actor	Davena Wihagun	Mahendra Perera
Best Actress	Davena Wihagun	Anoma Janadari
Best Supporting Actor	Nidahase Piya DS	Poojitha de Mel
Best Supporting Actress	Davena Wihagun	Samanalee Fonseka
Best Cinematographer	Vaishnavee	Nimal Mendis
Best Lyricist	Sarungal	Achala Soloman
Best Music Director	According to Matthew	Chandana Jayasinghe
Best Song	Sarungal	Ranga Dassanayake
Best Playback Singer	Gharasarapa	Bachi Susan
Best Playback Songstress	Gharasarapa	Samitha Mudunkotuwa
Best Editor	Komaali Kings	Anjelo Jones
Best Sound Designer	Nidahase Piya DS	Pravin Jayaratne
Best Art Director	Komaali Kings	Dasun Ravinath
Best Make-up Artist	Vaishnavee	Ebert Wijesinghe
Best Make-up Artist	Vaishnavee	Ranjith Manthagaweera
Best Actor in a Comedy Role	Komaali Kings	Raja Ganesan
Best Upcoming Actor	Gharasarapa	Devnaka Porage
Best Upcoming Actress	Gharasarapa	Kavindya Adhikari
Maximum Audience Response	Bimba Devi Alias Yashodhara	
Special Jury Awards	Salei Pukkal (acting)	Sri Niroshan
Special Jury Awards	Salei Pukkal (acting)	Sudharshan Rutnam
Special Jury Awards	Goal (acting)	David Karunaratne
Merit Awards	Sarungal (acting)	Chamathka Lakmini
Merit Awards	Goal (acting)	Nayana Darshani Perera

== President awarding - Ranil Wickramasinghe ==
=== 2019 Winners ===
- Best Film: Ginnen Upan Seethala -
- Best Direction:
- Best Actor: Ginnen Upan Seethala - Kamal Addrarachchi
- Best Actress: Dekala Purudu Kenek - Samadi Laksiri
- Best Script Writer:
- Best Cinematographer:
- Best Editor:
- Best Music Director:
- Best Art Director:
- Best Sound Director:
- Best Supporting Actor:
- Best Supporting Actress:
- Best Lyrics Writer:
- Best Playback Singer Male:
- Best Playback Singer Female: Umariya Sinhawansa
- Special Jury Award:
- Merit Awards:

=== 2020 Winners ===
- Best Film: The New Paper
- Best Direction: Palagetiyo - Vasantha Obeysekera
- Best Actor: "The News Paper" - Kumara Thirimadura
- Best Actress: Panshu - Nita Fernando
- Best Script Writer:
- Best Cinematographer:
- Best Editor:
- Best Music Director:
- Best Art Director:
- Best Sound Director:
- Best Supporting Actor:
- Best Supporting Actress:
- Best Lyrics Writer:
- Best Playback Singer Male:
- Best Playback Singer Female: Nanda Malini
- Special Jury Award:
- Merit Awards:
