= 34th Sarasaviya Awards =

2018 awards festival for Sinhala cinema

- 34rd Sarasaviya Awards
- Date: August 3, 2018
- Site: Bandaranaike Memorial International Conference Hall, Colombo, Sri Lanka
- Hosted by: Saman Athahudahetti

Highlights
- Best Picture: 2017 28; 2016 Motor Bicycle
- Most awards: 28

Television coverage
- Network: Associated Newspapers of Ceylon Limited

The 34th Sarasaviya Awards festival (Sinhala: 34වැනි සරසවිය සම්මාන උලෙළ), presented by the Associated Newspapers of Ceylon Limited, was held to honor the best films of 2016 and 2017 Sinhala cinema on August 3, 2018, at the BMICH, Colombo 07, Sri Lanka at 6:00 p.m. The ceremony was hosted by Saman Atahdudahetti. Prime Minister Ranil Wickramasinghe was the chief guest.

28 won the most awards, including Best Picture, for 2017 and Motor Bicycle won Best Picture for 2016.

The Sarasaviya Awards ceremony is one of the oldest film events in Sri Lanka. The awards were first introduced in 1964 and are often referred to as the Sinhala Cinema industry's equivalent to The Oscars.

The next edition 35th Sarasaviya Awards was award in 2024.

== Winners and nominees ==
The nominees were announced August 3, 2018, on the night of the awards immediately prior to the naming of the winners.

=== Awards for films released in 2016 ===
Category	Film	Recipient
Best Film	Motor Bicycle	
Best Director	Obe Aesalaga	Asoka Hadagama
Best Actor	Motor Bicycle	Dasun Pathirana
Best Actress	Sarigama	Pooja Umashankar
Best Supporting Actor	Adaraniya Kathawak	Bimal Jayakody
Best Supporting Actress	Sarigama	Gayani Gisanthika
Best Script Writer	Oba Nathuwa Oba Ekka	
Best Cinematographer	Sarigama	Wishwa Balasooriya
Best Editor	Motor Bicycle	Shamira Rangana
Lester James Peries Award for best film to be screen	Dekala Prudu Kenek and Bahuchithawadiya	Malith Hegoda and Malaka Dewapriya
Ranapala Bodhinagoda Memorial Literary Award		Laxshman Wickramasinghe
Rana Thisara Award		Suwaneetha Weerasinghe
Rana Thisara Award		Robin Fernando
Best Music Direction	Motor Bycecle	Ajith Kumarasiri
Best Art Direction	Maharaja Gemunu	Rohan Samara Divakara
Best Makeup Artist	Sarigama	Vidura Abeydeera
Best Sound Effects	Sarigama	Aruna Priyashantha Kalu Arachchi
Best Lyricist	Motor Bicycle	Shamira Rangana
Best Male Playback Singer	Song Ammage Male for Motor Bicycle	Ajith Kumarasiri
Best Female Playback Singer	Song Sithuvili Pura for Adaraniya Kathawak	Kushani Sadareka
Best Emerging Actor	Sath Pethi Kusuma	Jehan Appuhami
Best Emerging Actress	Sath Pethi Kusuma	Yasoda Rasaduni
Merit Awards	Age Asa Ada	Sadali Hadagama
Merit Awards	Suhada Koka	Lal Kularatne
Merit Awards	Zoom	Sheshadri Priyasad
Merit Awards		Boomi Harendra
Merit Awards		Udara Samaraweera
Most Popular Film		Paththini

=== Awards for films released in 2017 ===
Winners are listed first, highlighted in boldface, and indicated with a double dagger (‡).

**Best Picture**: **28** ‡; Dirty, Yellow, Darkness; Alone in a Valley; Dark in the White Light	**Best Director**: **Prasanna Jayakody – 28**‡; Vimukthi Jayasundara – Dark in the White Light; Boodee Keerthisena – Alone in a Valley
**Best Actor**: **Saumya Liyanage – Alone in a Valley**‡; Jackson Anthony – Dharmayuddhaya; Mahendra Perera – 28	**Best Actress**: **Samanalee Fonseka – Dirty, Yellow, Darkness**‡; Dilhani Ekanayake – Dharmayuddhaya; Semini Iddamalgoda – 28
**Best Supporting Actor**: **Roshan Ravindra – Sulanga Gini Aran (Dark in the White Light)**‡; Dilhani Ekanayake – Dharmayuddhaya; Kumara Thirimadura – 28	**Best Supporting Actress**: **Yureni Noshika – Nino Live**‡; Menaka Peiris – Aloko Udapadi; Umali Thilakarathna – A-Level
**Best Original Score**: **Rohana Weerasinghe – Dirty, Yellow, Darkness**‡; Lakshman Joseph De Saram – Alone in a Valley; Deshaka Bamunumulla – 28	**Best Song Lyricist**: **Rajeev Wasantha Welgama – Kaala**‡; Sunil Ariyaratne – Dirty, Yellow, Darkness; Rohan Perera – A-Level
**Best Male Singer**: **Dumal Warnakulasuriya – Dirty, Yellow, Darkness**‡; Nadeemal Perera – A-Level; Amarasiri Peiris – Aloko Udapadi	**Best Female Singer**: **Vidusha Nethranjali – Ali Kathawa**‡; Uresha Ravihari – Heena Hoyana Samanallu; Sachini Ranawaka – Kaala
**Best Cinematography**: **Chandana Jayasinghe – 28**‡; Prabath Roshan – Aloko Udapadi; Jaan Shenberger – Dirty, Yellow, Darkness; Channa Deshapriya & Dhanushka Gunathilake – Dark in the White Light	**Best Editing**: **Rangana Sinharage – 28**‡; Shan Alwis – Aloko Udapadi; Chandana Prasanna, Udara Weeraratne – Alone in a Valley
**Best Production Design**: **Sunil Wijeratne, Asanka Nilavathura – Sarigama**‡; Upul Chamila – Let Her Cry; Bimal Dushmantha – Paththini	**Best Sound**: **Sasika Ruwan Marasinghe – Aloko Udapadi**‡; Aruna Priyantha Kaluarachchi – Dark in the White Light; Pravin Jayaratne – Bandhanaya
**Best Makeup**: **Jayantha Ranawaka – Aloko Udapadi**‡; Kumara Galahitiyawa – Alone in a Valley; Narada Thotagamuwa – 28	**Best Emerging Actor**: **Dineth de Silva – Aloko Udapadi**‡; Nino Live – Nino Jayakodi; Thusitha Laknath – Metamophorsis
**Best Emerging Actress**: **Thisuri Yuwanika – Dharmayuddhaya**‡; Suranga Ranawaka – Dirty, Yellow, Darkness; Ruwangi Rathnayake – Dr. Nawariyan	**Special Jury Award**: **Rithika Kodithuwakku – Let Her Cry**‡
**Lester James Pieris Award** Not Awarded	**Ranapala Bodhinagoda Memorial Literary Award**: **Dharmasiri Bandaranayake**‡
**Rana Thisara Award**: **Dharmasiri Bandaranayake**‡; **Shriyani Amarasinghe**‡	**Merit Award**: **Senali Satharasinghe – Bandanaya**‡
**Merit Award**: **Keshali Rajapaksha – A-Level**‡	**Merit Award**: **Thisara Imbulana – Nino Live**‡
**Merit Award**: **Iroshan Madusanka – Ali Kathawak**‡	**Merit Award**: **Amiru Koralage – Paha Samath**‡
**Merit Award**: **Ranga S. Bandara – Dedunu Akase**‡	**Best Popular Picture**: **Aloko Udapadi**‡
