= Amawaka =

Amawaka may refer to:

- Amawaka people, an ethnic group of the Amazon
- Amawaka language
- Amawaka (film)
