= Shyam Fernando =

Sri Lankan actor (born 1972)

Shyam Fernando ශ්‍යාම් ප්‍රනාන්දු
- Born: 1972; Sri Lanka
- Occupations: Actor, dramatist

Shyam Fernando (Sinhala: ශ්‍යාම් ප්‍රනාන්දු) is a Sri Lankan actor in Sri Lankan cinema, stage drama, and television. He is also a dubbing artiste and has been nominated for several dramatic roles.

== Career ==
Fernando started his drama career under Somalatha Subasinghe with Play House Kotte. He joined Subasinghe's children’s productions such as Thoppi Welenda, Hima Kumari, and Walas Pawula. He was then selected for the play Veeraya Marila directed by Rajitha Dissanayake.

Fernando started his film career with a role in Oba Nathuwa Oba Ekka in 2012, directed by Prasanna Vithanage. His most popular cinema acting came through films Premaya Nam, Oba Nathuwa Oba Ekka, and Davena Wihagun. In 2020, he acted in the short One Blood directed by Chathura Fernando. In August 2020, he won the award for the Best Actor at the Hollywood Venus Awards short film festival in Istanbul, Turkey.

=== Notable theater works ===
- Adara Wasthuwa
- Bakamuna Weedi Basi
- Hithala Gaththu Theeranayak
- Nethuwa Bari Minihek
- Siriwardane Pawla

=== Notable television works ===
- Ado
- Ammai Duwai
- Appachchi
- Chandi Kumarihami
- See Raja
- Thaththa
- Thathparayak Denna
- Thumpane

== Filmography ==
Key
†	Denotes films that have not yet been released

=== As actor ===
Year	Film	Role	Ref.
2012	Oba Nathuwa Oba Ekka	Sarathsiri	
2016	Sakkarang	Rathnapala monk	
2017	Premaya Nam	Vishwa	
2017	Paha Samath	Doctor Meegaspe	
2018	Davena Wihagun	Paramilitary leader	
2019	Asandhimitta	Film director	
2019	President Super Star	Lawyer	
2020	Ethalaya	Lakshman Suranimala	
2020	Avilenasului	Kamal Senadhilankara	
2020	The Newspaper	Hela Udawa, editor in chief	
2022	Ponniyin Selvan: I	King Mahinda V	
2019	Gaadi	Bulathgama Disawe	
2022	CineMa	Sumal Dharmaratne	
2022	Praana	Catholic priest	
2023	Asu		
2023	Ape Principal		
2023	Paradise	Tour guide Dr. Andrew	
2024	Ridee Seenu		
2024	Doosra	construction manager	
2026	Father	Minister	
2026	Malaki Duwe Nubha	Prof. Kavindra	
TBA	Amawaka †		
TBA	Sulanga Numba Avidin †		
TBA	Room No 106 †		

=== As director ===
Year	Film	Ref.
TBA	Sankarami †	

== Awards and accolades ==
He has won several awards at local film, stage drama festivals and television festivals.

=== State Drama Festival ===
Year	Nominee / work	Award	Result
2014	Adara Wasthuwa	Best Actor	Won

=== Signis Awards ===
Year	Nominee / work	Award	Result
2015	Oba Nathuwa Oba Ekka	Best Actor	Won

=== Presidential Film Awards ===
Year	Nominee / work	Award	Result
2017	Oba Nathuwa Oba Ekka	Best Actor	Won

=== Sumathi Awards ===
Year	Nominee / work	Award	Result
2018	See Raja	Best Actor	Won

=== Raigam Tele'es ===
Year	Nominee / work	Award	Result
2018	Thaththa	Best Actor	Nominated

=== Derana Film Awards ===
Year	Nominee / work	Award	Result
2018	Oba Nathuwa Oba Ekka	Best Actor	Nominated

=== Hiru Golden Film Awards ===
Year	Nominee / work	Award	Result
2016	Oba Nathuwa Oba Ekka	Best Actor	Nominated
