= Duhulu Malak =

1976 Sri Lankan romantic film

Duhulu Malak දුහුළු මලක්
- Ravindra and Nita, scene at Nucolombo.
- Directed by: Vijaya Dharmasri
- Based on: novel by H.L. Wijetunga
- Starring: Nita Fernando; Ravindra Randeniya; Tony Ranasinghe
- Cinematography: Sumitta Amarasinghe
- Edited by: Jayatissa Dillimuni
- Music by: Sarath Dassanayake
- Release date: 25 June 1976
- Country: Sri Lanka
- Language: Sinhala

Duhulu Malak is a 1976 Sinhalese language romance film directed by Vijaya Dharmasri. The film stars Nita Fernando, Ravindra Randeniya and Tony Ranasinghe and is notable for containing the first depiction of adultery in a Sinhala film. that follows the lives of middle-class people in Sri Lanka. As per some cinema analysts, the story of the film advises young people to be aware of their own attitudes, such as understanding, fairness and patience as they will lead them to a better married life.

The movie was critically acclaimed; the British Film Institute listed it on their long list of Top Sri Lankan Films in 2006.

Also Nita Fernando reached the peak of her cinema career by winning the OCIC Best Actress Award in that year for the movie.

== Plot ==
The movie examines a woman's sexual desire, similar to the British movie Lady Chatterley's Lover.

A bored housewife married to a university lecturer, her cousin, seeks out external influences to remedy her boredom in 1970s middle-class society in Sri Lanka.

One day the housewife, Nilupa Suraweera and their servant goes for shopping and they meet one neighbour, a young man named Rohan inside a shop and they talk and recognize each other. Then, gradually the friendship between the two grows into a deeper bond. One day, the young man invites the lady and family except the husband Suraweera, to visit a ship that had arrived from abroad at the Colombo port. Inside the ship, the lady and the young man are left alone and their hidden feelings are exposed as a love affair blooms.

The lady gets to know about a musical show conducted at a place that they can reach very easily, by one of her favorite music stars. She likes to attend this show, but Suraweera is not willing, although he finally agrees. They meet Rohan there as well and they have a small chat. They come home early because Suraweera is not interested in the show.

In the meantime, the lovers meet each other secretly, mostly in the absence of the lady's husband. The servant of the house also shows a slight willingness to support their secret love affair. Once the couple escapes narrowly as the husband returns home earlier than before.

One day, the family schedules to visit the hill country because the husband has some official commitments in the area. The lady informs her lover about this journey as well and they meet there secretly to enjoy.

Later on, one neighbor who likes to gossip about other people's matters notices this love affair and informs the husband several times through anonymous phone calls. The husband who is now upset about the situation, decides to discuss the matter with his wife. Afterwards, he advises her not to step out of the house without his permission. During this time, the lady also begins to understand the complexity of this illicit affair as her only intention was to wipe out her boredom, although the lover is actually very serious about it.

A lady who works in Rohan's office is interested in him, but he his not interested in her. So, she suspects that Rohan may have a girlfriend. She secretly investigates it and discovers that he is having an affair with a married woman. One day she meets Nilupa and informs her that she is going to marry Rohan and threatens her to stop the affair between them. In the same way, she visits Rohan's home and informs his adopted parents of the matter.

One day, one of the lady's good friends visit them and ask her if she can visit her place to make a cake. After seeking permission from the husband, the lady goes with her friend to meet her lover. When they meet, she tries hard to explain to him the complexity of the situation, but the lover, who is crazy about her, is not willing to listen to her.

Sometime later, one day the husband witnesses his wife going out with another person in a car. He immediately attempts to follow the car, but fails to reach them. Irritated with everything that had happened, he rushes home to send the child and servant to their parent's home.

During this same period, the lady manages to make her lover understand the complex nature of this issue and thereby agrees to make a halt to their extramarital affair and return home. But, when she returns home, she finds her husband so furious, that he is almost ready to kill her. So, she apologizes to her husband for all the mistakes she had committed and also promises never to deceive him in that way.

== Cast ==
- Nita Fernando as Nilupa Suraweera
- Ravindra Randeniya as Rohan Atukorale
- Tony Ranasinghe as Suray Suraweera
- Samanthi Lanerolle as Lechumi
- Inoka Weerasinghe as Manjula Suraweera
- Preethi Randeniya as Sulali Jayawardena
- Agnes Sirisena as Sudu Amma
- J. B. L. Gunasekera as Sudu Uncle
- Suminda Sirisena as Upali

== Music ==
The music in the film was composed by Sarath Dassanayake. Playback singing in the song "Rankenden Bendi Aadarayi" was by Nanda Malini. Sujatha Aththanayaka and Abeywardena Balasuriya duet on "Bonda Meedum Kandu Relle", which was penned by Ajantha Ranasinghe.

== Miscellaneous ==
- The psychological background of the story is very keenly highlighted here. The husband, who is always dedicated to his work does not bother to understand his wife's feeling nor has any time for her. The wife treats the husband well, but his disregard for her feelings, causes her to deceive him in order to search for love. The lover too has been adopted by a couple and does not have real parents, and hence no parental love. He too is in search of love. But, the lady who went in search of love also values family life, and so only treated the relationship as a place for her to ease her tensions.
- The fantastic scenery shown in the film is from an area called "Selesumthenne" at Nuwara Eliya with a background song "Bonda Meedum Kandu Relle-Surangana Rajadahane" (living in a fairyland surrounded by misty mountains).

== See also ==
List of Sri Lankan films
