= A Level (film) =

- official poster
- Sinhala: A ලෙවල්
- Directed by: Rohan Perera
- Written by: Rohan Perera
- Produced by: Maharaja Entertainments
- Starring: Jayalath Manoratne; Chandani Seneviratne; Umali Thilakarathne; Thumindu Dodantenna; Sachira Wijesinghe; Lahiruka Ekanayake
- Cinematography: Ruwan Costa
- Edited by: Ajith Ramanayake
- Music by: Suresh Maliyadde
- Production company: Maharaja Entertainments
- Distributed by: EAP Theatres
- Release date: 18 December 2017
- Running time: 88 minutes
- Country: Sri Lanka
- Language: Sinhala

A Level is a 2017 Sri Lankan Sinhala Teen drama film directed by Rohan Perera and produced by Susara Dinal for Maharaja Entertainments. It stars Jayalath Manoratne, Chandani Seneviratne and Umali Thilakarathne in lead roles along with many newcomers in the teen crew. The music is composed by Suresh Maliyadde. The muhurath ceremony was held at the Savoy Theatre, Wallawatte. Despite the film receiving mixed critical acclaim, the film made a record box-office earning during its screening. It's the 1293rd Sri Lankan film in the Sinhala cinema.

== Plot ==
After getting through the O/L Examination with outstanding results, Anuththara with his friends eagerly look forward to experience their final years in school as seniors in the A/L class. They befriend Ahinsa and the other new girls who join their school. Ahinsa draws everyone's attention for her smartness as well as her cheerful yet mysterious behaviour. Her irregular school attendance and the rumours circulating about her, make the others suspect that there's a hidden story behind her cheerfulness.

== Cast ==
- Jayalath Manoratne as Uncle
- Chandani Seneviratne as Lady lawyer
- Umali Thilakarathne as Parami
- Thumindu Dodantenna as Nissanka
- Jayani Senanayake as Sylvia Fernando
- Meena Kumari as Anuththara's mother
- Chamila Peiris as School principal
- Dasun Nishan as Lawyer
- Jayaratne Galagedara as Principal
- Janvi Apsara as Sihini, Parami's daughter
- Sachira Wijesinghe as Anuththara
- Lahiruka Ekanayake as Ahinsa
- Kasun Madhusankha as Yomal
- Chamath Randeni as Ravindu
- Wathsala Shashimal as Ashan
- Niwarthana Dewage as Yahani
- Keshali Rajapakse as Suba
- Viraj Dhanusha as Kalpa

== Soundtrack ==
The 1st single of the soundtrack, Mathakayan by Nadeemal Perera, was released under the M Entertainment label on 24 November 2017. The 2nd song in the film was released on 14 December 2017. Lyrics of both tracks were penned by director Rohan Perera.

No.	Title	Lyrics	Singer(s)	Length
1.	"Mathakayan"	Rohan Perera	Nadeemal Perera	3.52
2.	"Sagare Wage"	Rohan Perera	Various Artists	4.00

== Accolades ==
Award	Category	Recipient(s)	Result
34th Sarasaviya Awards	Best Actress in a Supporting Role	Umali Thilakarathne	Nominated
34th Sarasaviya Awards	Best Lyricist	Rohan Perera	Nominated
34th Sarasaviya Awards	Best Singer - Male	Nadeemal Perera	Nominated
34th Sarasaviya Awards	Merit Award	Keshali Rajapaksha	Won
Hiru Golden Film Award	Best Actress in a Supporting Role	Umali Thilakarathne	Won
Hiru Golden Film Award	Special Recognition Certificate	Lahiruka Ekanayaka	Won
Derana Film Awards 2018	Best Actress in a Supporting Role	Umali Thilakarathne	Won
Derana Film Awards 2018	Special Recognition Certificate	Lahiruka Ekanayaka	Won
Derana Film Awards 2018	Special Recognition Certificate	Sachira Wijesinghe	Won
Presidential Film Awards 2019 for 2017	Merit Award	Sachira Wijesinghe	Won
Presidential Film Awards 2019 for 2017	Special Jury Award	Jayalath Manoratne	Won
Presidential Film Awards 2019 for 2017	Best Playback Singer (Male)	Nadeemal Perera	Nominated
Presidential Film Awards 2019 for 2017	Best Melody	Suresh Maliyadde - for 'Sagare Wage'	Nominated
Presidential Film Awards 2019 for 2017	Best Music Direction	Suresh Maliyadde	Nominated
