= 35th Sarasaviya Awards =

2024 awards festival for Sinhala cinema

- Date: March 28, 2024
- Site: Bandaranaike Memorial International Conference Hall, Colombo, Sri Lanka
- Hosted by: Saman Athahudahetti
- Directed by: Malith Hegoda

Highlights
- Best Picture: Dekala Purudu Kenek
- Most awards: Dekala Purudu Kenek and The Newspaper
- Most nominations: TBA

Television coverage
- Network: Associated Newspapers of Ceylon Limited

The 35th Sarasaviya Awards festival (Sinhala: 35වැනි සරසවිය සම්මාන උලෙළ), presented by the Associated Newspapers of Ceylon Limited, will held to honor the best films of 2019 and 2020 Sinhala cinema on March 28, 2024, at the BMICH, Colombo 07, Sri Lanka at 6:00 p.m. The ceremony was hosted by Saman Atahdudahetti. President Ranil Wickramasinghe was announced the chief guest but was represented by his Media minister Bandula Gunawardane. Awards festival is held after the absence of 6 years due to COVid 19 and the economic and political crisis in Sri Lanka.

== Awards for films released in 2019 ==
Winners are listed first, highlighted in boldface, and indicated with a double dagger (‡).

**Best Picture**: Dekala Purudu Kenek ‡; Ginnen Upan Seethala; Sansaraye Dadayakkaraya	**Best Director**: **Malith Hegoda – Dekala Purudu kenek**‡; Anuruddha Jayasinghe – Ginnen Upan Seethala; Prasanna Jayakodi – Sansarare Dadayakkaraya
**Best Actor**: **Bimal Jayakodi – Dekala Purudu Kenk**‡; Hemal Ranasinghe – Wijayabha Kollaya; Kamal Addaraachchci – Ginnen Upan Seeltha	**Best Actress**: **Samadhi Laksiri – Dekala Purudu Kenek**‡; Nilmini Sigera – Asamintha; Sulochana Weerasinghe – Ginnen Upan Seethala
**Best Supporting Actor**: **Lakshan Mendis – Dekala Purudu kenek**‡; Khan Mariya – Wijayaba Kollaya; Dasun Pathitana – Husma	**Best Supporting Actress**: **Chulakshi Ranathunga – Wijayaba Kollaya**‡; Chanu Dissnayaka – Uturn; Kaushalia Fernando – Thala
**Best Original Score**: **Sumudu Guruge – Sansare Dadayakkkaya** ‡; Lakshman Joseph De Saram – Alone in a Valley; Deshaka Bamunumulla – 28	**Best Song Lyricist**: **Lalith Rathnayaka – Wishama Bhaga**‡; Sunil Ariyaratne – Wijayabha Kollaya; Ravi Siriwardhana – Wilipawra
**Best Male Singer**: **Sunil Edirisinha – Weli Pawra**‡; Kasun Kalhara – Thala	**Best Female Singer**: **Umariya Sinhahawansha – Wijayabha Kollaya**‡; Uresha Ravihari – Husma; Mahesha Sandamali – Wishama Bhaga
**Best Cinematography**: **Chandana Jayasinghe – 28**‡; Prabath Roshan – Aloko Udapadi; Jaan Shenberger – Dirty, Yellow, Darkness; Channa Deshapriya & Dhanushka Gunathilake – Dark in the White Light	**Best Editing**: **Rangana Sinharage – 28**‡; Shan Alwis – Aloko Udapadi; Chandana Prasanna, Udara Weeraratne – Alone in a Valley
**Best Production Design**: **Sunil Wijeratne, Asanka Nilavathura – Sarigama**‡; Upul Chamila – Let Her Cry; Bimal Dushmantha – Paththini	**Best Sound**: **Sasika Ruwan Marasinghe – Aloko Udapadi**‡; Aruna Priyantha Kaluarachchi – Dark in the White Light; Pravin Jayaratne – Bandhanaya
**Best Makeup**: **Naratha Thotagamuwa;– Ginnen Upan Seethala**‡; Priyantha Dissanaya – Dekala Purudu Kenek; Narada Thotagamuwa – Sansaraye Dadayakkaraya	**Best Emerging Actor**: **Dineth de Silva – Aloko Udapadi**‡; Nino Live – Nino Jayakodi; Thusitha Laknath – Metamophorsis
**Best Emerging Actress**: **Thisuri Yuwanika – Dharmayuddhaya**‡; Suranga Ranawaka – Dirty, Yellow, Darkness; Ruwangi Rathnayake – Dr. Nawariyan	**Special Jury Award**: **Rithika Kodithuwakku – Let Her Cry**‡
**Lester James Pieris -Rana Thisara Award**: **Victor Rathnayaka** ‡; **Sathischandra Edirisinghe** ‡	**Ranapala Bodhinagoda Memorial Literary Award**: **Dharmasiri Bandaranayake**‡
**S**: **Senali Satharasinghe – Bandanaya**‡
**Lux Popular ActorAward**: **Hemal Ranasinghe** ‡	**Lux Popular Actress**: **Shanudri Priyasad**‡
**Special Award**: **Jackson Anthony**‡	**Merit Award**: **Amiru Koralage – Paha Samath**‡
**Merit Award**: **Ranga S. Bandara – Dedunu Akase**‡	**Best Popular Picture**: **Tsunami**‡

== Awards for films released in 2020 ==
Winners are listed first, highlighted in boldface, and indicated with a double dagger (‡).

**Best Picture**: The Newspaper ‡; Ginnen Upan Seethala; Sansaraye Dadayakkaraya	**Best Director**: **Visakesha Chandrasekaran – Paanshu**‡; Anuruddha Jayasinghe – Ginnen Upan Seethala; Prasanna Jayakodi – Sansarare Dadayakkaraya
**Best Actor**: **Kumara Thirimadura – The Newspaper** ‡; Hemal Ranasinghe – Wijayabha Kollaya; Kamal Addaraachchci – Ginnen Upan Seeltha	**Best Actress**: **Nita Fernando – Paanshu**‡; Nilmini Sigera – Asamintha; Sulochana Weerasinghe – Ginnen Upan Seethala
**Best Supporting Actor**: **Lakshan Mendis – Dekala Purudu kenek**‡; Khan Mariya – Wijayaba Kollaya; Dasun Pathitana – Husma	**Best Supporting Actress**: **Chulakshi Ranathunga – Wijayaba Kollaya**‡; Chanu Dissnayaka – Uturn; Kaushalia Fernando – Thala
**Best Original Score**: **Sumudu Guruge – Sansare Dadayakkkaya** ‡; Lakshman Joseph De Saram – Alone in a Valley; Deshaka Bamunumulla – 28	**Best Song Lyricist**: **Lalith Rathnayaka – Wishama Bhaga**‡; Sunil Ariyaratne – Wijayabha Kollaya; Ravi Siriwardhana – Wilipawra
**Best Male Singer**: **Sunil Edirisinha – Weli Pawra**‡; Kasun Kalhara – Thala	**Best Female Singer**: **Nanda Malini – The Newspaper** ‡; Uresha Ravihari – Husma; Mahesha Sandamali – Wishama Bhaga
**Best Cinematography**: **Chandana Jayasinghe – 28**‡; Prabath Roshan – Aloko Udapadi; Jaan Shenberger – Dirty, Yellow, Darkness; Channa Deshapriya & Dhanushka Gunathilake – Dark in the White Light	**Best Editing**: **Rangana Sinharage – 28**‡; Shan Alwis – Aloko Udapadi; Chandana Prasanna, Udara Weeraratne – Alone in a Valley
**Best Production Design**: **Sunil Wijeratne, Asanka Nilavathura – Sarigama**‡; Upul Chamila – Let Her Cry; Bimal Dushmantha – Paththini	**Best Sound**: **Sasika Ruwan Marasinghe – Aloko Udapadi**‡; Aruna Priyantha Kaluarachchi – Dark in the White Light; Pravin Jayaratne – Bandhanaya
**Best Makeup**: **Naratha Thotagamuwa;– Ginnen Upan Seethala**‡; Priyantha Dissanaya – Dekala Purudu Kenek; Narada Thotagamuwa – Sansaraye Dadayakkaraya	**Best Emerging Actor**: **Dineth de Silva – Aloko Udapadi**‡; Nino Live – Nino Jayakodi; Thusitha Laknath – Metamophorsis
**Best Emerging Actress**: **Thisuri Yuwanika – Dharmayuddhaya**‡; Suranga Ranawaka – Dirty, Yellow, Darkness; Ruwangi Rathnayake – Dr. Nawariyan	**Special Jury Award**: **Rithika Kodithuwakku – Let Her Cry**‡
**Lester James Pieris -Rana Thisara Award**: **Victor Rathnayaka** ‡; **Sathischandra Edirisinghe** ‡	**Ranapala Bodhinagoda Memorial Literary Award**: **Dharmasiri Bandaranayake**‡
**S**: **Senali Satharasinghe – Bandanaya**‡
**Lux Popular ActorAward**: **Hemal Ranasinghe** ‡	**Lux Popular Actress**: **Shanudri Priyasad**‡
**Special Award**: **Jackson Anthony**‡	**Merit Award**: **Amiru Koralage – Paha Samath**‡
**Merit Award**: **Ranga S. Bandara – Dedunu Akase**‡	**Best Popular Picture**: **Tsunami**‡
