= Goal (2018 film) =

- Sinhala: ගෝල්
- Directed by: Rohan Perera
- Written by: Rohan Perera
- Produced by: Maharaja Entertainments
- Starring: Jayalath Manoratne; Chandani Seneviratne; Kaushalya Fernando
- Cinematography: Paalitha Perera
- Edited by: Ajith Ramanayake
- Music by: Suresh Maliyadde
- Production company: M Entertainment
- Distributed by: CEL Theatres
- Release date: 26 July 2018
- Country: Sri Lanka
- Language: Sinhala

Goal (Sinhala: ගෝල්) is a 2018 Sri Lankan Sinhala children's film directed by Rohan Perera and produced by Susara Dinal for Maharaja Entertainments as a Sirasa Movie. It stars Jayalath Manoratne and Chandani Seneviratne in lead roles along with Anula Bulathsinhala and Kaushalya Fernando. Music composed by Suresh Maliyadde. It is the 1309th Sri Lankan film in the Sinhala cinema.

== Plot ==
The film revolves around a bunch of talented boys in a very remote school Millawitiya Junior School in Kaluwara Eliya. The fate of the children changes when new coming teacher, Samarasekara Sir (played by Manoratne) introduces them to football, an alien game to the children until that point.

Reluctant at first, the kids slowly get into the game. The adults are unsure at first, saying it a waste of time, but as the kids begin to improve and their enthusiasm growing, they support them.

Facing schools outside Colombo, with kids who have almost lifetimes of practice, they move forward. They end up winning against a most renowned school in all of Sri Lanka, making a name for themselves.

== Cast ==
- Jayalath Manoratne as Somaweera Samarasekara
- Chandani Seneviratne as Mrs. Samarasekara
- Anula Bulathsinhala as Grandmother
- Kaushalya Fernando as Village school principal
- Nayana Hettiarachchi as Kalpa's mother
- Lakshman Mendis as Principal
- Jayani Senanayake as Tharindu's mother

=== Child cast ===
The film consists of more than 70 new child actors.

- Mohomad Sham as Jabus
- Kavindu Kalhara as Kalpa
- Rizan Naizer as Sahan
- Theshan Thushmika as Rachira
- Dananjaya Naveen as Vihanga
- Devid Karunarathna as Sandun
- Pavan Bimsara as Pabalu
- Subhashini Jayarathna

== Soundtrack ==
Released under M Entertainments label in 2018, all three songs in the soundtrack were penned by director Rohan Perera. Music directed by Suresh Maliyadde.

| No. | Title | Lyrics | Singer(s) | Length |
|---|---|---|---|---|
| 1. | "Athe Paye Hiriyanna" | Rohan Perera | Dinath De Silva | 03.43 |
| 2. | "Diriyen" | Rohan Perera | Sanuka Wickramasinghe | 04.18 |
| 3. | "Sansaraye Nawathenaka" | Rohan Perera | Kasun Kalhara | 04.17 |

== Accolades ==
| Award | Category | Recipient(s) | Result |
|---|---|---|---|
| SLIM-Nielsen Peoples Awards 2019 | People's Choice Film Of The Year | Goal | Won |
| Presidential Film Awards 2019 for 2018 | Best Direction | Rohan Perera | Nominated |
| Presidential Film Awards 2019 for 2018 | Best Actor in a Leading Role | Jayalath Manoratne | Nominated |
| Presidential Film Awards 2019 for 2018 | Best Actress in a Supporting Role | Chandani Seneviratne | Nominated |
| Presidential Film Awards 2019 for 2018 | Best Actress in a Supporting Role | Kaushalya Fernando | Nominated |
| Presidential Film Awards 2019 for 2018 | Merit Award | Nayana Hettiarachchi | Won |
| Presidential Film Awards 2019 for 2018 | Special Jury Award | David Karunarathne | Won |
| Presidential Film Awards 2019 for 2018 | Best Editing | Ajith Ramanayake | Nominated |
| Presidential Film Awards 2019 for 2018 | Best Playback Singer (Male) | Kasun Kalhara - for 'Sansaraye Nawathanaka’ | Nominated |
| Presidential Film Awards 2019 for 2018 | Best Music Direction | Suresh Maliyadde | Nominated |
| Derana Film Awards 2019 | Best Actor in a Leading Role | Jayalath Manoratne | Nominated |
| Derana Film Awards 2019 | Best Actress in a Supporting Role | Kaushalya Fernando | Nominated |
| Derana Film Awards 2019 | Best Sound Design | Aruna Priyantha Kaluarachchi | Nominated |
| SIGNIS Awards (Sri Lanka) 2019 | Best Film of the Year | Goal | Nominated |
| SIGNIS Awards (Sri Lanka) 2019 | Best Direction | Rohan Perera | Nominated |
| SIGNIS Awards (Sri Lanka) 2019 | Best Screenplay | Rohan Perera | Nominated |
| SIGNIS Awards (Sri Lanka) 2019 | Best Actor in a Leading Role | Jayalath Manoratne | Nominated |
| SIGNIS Awards (Sri Lanka) 2019 | Best Actor in a Supporting Role | Xavier Kanishka | Nominated |
| SIGNIS Awards (Sri Lanka) 2019 | Best Editing | Ajith Ramanayake | Nominated |

== External links (trailers and info) ==
- Goal at IMDb
- Goal on YouTube
