= Amawaka (film) =

- Directed by: Vijitha Gunaratne
- Written by: Vijitha Gunaratne
- Starring: Shyam Fernando; Suranga Ranawana; Duleeka Marapana
- Country: Sri Lanka
- Language: Sinhala

Amawaka (The Invisible Moon) (Sinhala: අමාවක) is an upcoming Sri Lankan Sinhala drama film directed by Vijitha Gunaratne and produced by Upul Jayasinghe for Nilwala Films. It stars Shyam Fernando and Suranga Ranawana in lead roles along with Duleeka Marapana and Samson Siripala. Music direction is by Tharupathi Munasinghe.

== Cast ==
- Duleeka Marapana
- Shyam Fernando
- Suranga Ranawaka
