= Paha Samath =

- promotional poster
- Sinhala: පහ සමත්
- Directed by: Jayaprakash Sivagurunadan
- Written by: Rasika Suraweerarachchi
- Produced by: New Imperial Talkies
- Starring: Amiru Koralage; Dilhani Ekanayake; Uddika Premarathna
- Cinematography: Thusitha Anuradha
- Edited by: Ravindra Guruge
- Music by: Kapila Pugalaarchchi
- Production company: Sarasavi studio
- Distributed by: CEL Theatres
- Release date: 1 December 2017
- Country: Sri Lanka
- Language: Sinhala

Paha Samath (Sinhala: පහ සමත්), interchangeably use as 5 Samath, is a 2017 Sri Lankan Sinhala children's film directed by Jayaprakash Sivagurunadan and produced by Hans Anton Vanstarex for New Imperial Talkies. It stars new coming child actors along with Dilhani Ekanayake and Uddika Premarathna. Music composed by Kapila Pugalaarchchi. The muhurath ceremony was held at the New Imperial Talkies

It is the 1291st Sri Lankan film in the Sinhala cinema. The film received mostly positive reviews from critics. Child artist Amiru Koralage won a merit award at the 2018 Sarasaviya Awards.

== Plot ==
The film discuss about the modern life of children who struggle to pass grade 5 scholarship and the pressure exerted by parents on them. The film emphasize well to express what happened to the bond with nature and outdoor sports due to whole day studies and tuition classes.

== Cast ==
- Uddika Premarathna as Samath's father
- Dilhani Ekanayake as Samath's mother
- Shyam Fernando as Doctor Meegaspe
- Semini Iddamalgoda as Mrs. Meegaspe
- Priyantha Seneviratne as Bus conductor
- Giriraj Kaushalya as Bus driver
- Dayadeva Edirisinghe as Village principal
- Saddha Mangala Sooriyabandara as Town school's principal
- Wageesha Salgadu as Samath's sister
- Iranganie Serasinghe as Vinura's granny
- Malkanthi Jayasinghe as Village school class teacher
- Asha Edirisinghe as Town school's class teacher
- Ranjan Sooriyakumara as News reader
- Upatissa Balasuriya as Hostel warden
- Sarath Chandrasiri as Village farmer
- Rohan Wijethunga as Bus passenger
- Udari Warnakulasooriya in cameo role

=== Child cast ===
- Amiru Koralage as Samath Peragammana
- Sharad Chanduma as Vinura Meegaspe
- Sejan Hansana as Thusil
- Kivindi Kasundara as Sayani
- Yovindu Ethugala
- Obhashitha Kangarage

== Songs ==
The film contains four songs.

No.	Title	Lyrics	Singer(s)	Length
1.	"Muthu Sinaha Kekulu Pipee"	Rasika Suraweerarachchi	Janani Imathma, Sandaru Gimhana, Maduranga Dharmawardena
2.	"Hisbada....Hisbada....Hisbada...."	Rasika Suraweerarachchi	Janani Imathma, Sandaru Gimhana, Maduranga Dharmawardena
3.	"Ahas Gabe Pawewi Walakule"	Nandana Wickramage	Kaveesh Induwara, Giriraj Kaushalya, Priyantha Seneviratne
4.	"Kauda Kauda Me Hansa Vilata Aaa"	Bandula Nanayakkarawasam	Sandu Pugalarachchi, Tharu Pugalarachchi, Sanuka Samarasinghe, Isuka Wickramasinghe, Sihika Bandara, Rumen Amarasiri
