= Nita Fernando =

Sri Lankan actress and producer (born 1947)

- නීටා ප්‍රනාන්දු
- Born: September 5, 1947 (age 79); Negombo, Sri Lanka
- Occupation: Film actress / film producer
- Years active: 1965-1975; 1995–Present
- Spouse: Elian Perera
- Awards: Best Actress Award at the 1998 Singapore International Film Festival, Vishwa Kirthie Award, Presidential Award, Critics Award in 1999, OCIC Award for Best Actress in 2000

Kala Suri Nita Fernando (born September 5, 1947, නීටා ප්‍රනාන්දු) in Negombo, Sri Lanka, is a Sri Lankan cinema actress. She has starred in the films Duhulu Malak and Pavuru Walalu.

== Biography ==
=== Early life ===
Nita Fernando was the eldest of four children. She studied at Holy Family Convent Wennappuwa.

=== Personal life ===
Fernando gave up acting after her marriage to lawyer Elian Perera in 1975 and moved to Canada, where she worked as a receptionist at the Montreal General Hospital.

== Career ==
Nita Fernando made her screen debut in Landaka Mahima alongside Joe Abeywickrama in 1965. Over the next eight years, she made over 40 films, e.g., Duhulu Malak, Lasanda, Hadawath Neththo, Mangala, Wasana, and Shanthi.

Fernando obtained her first film role in Gamini Fonseka's Parasathu Mal. She was unable to appear in the film, however, because her parents didn't approve. Discouraged, she toyed with the idea of becoming a teacher before she returned to acting after finishing school. Her interest in film was supported by her uncle.

In 1983, she briefly returned to film, producing and starring in Sooriyakantha. She kept a low profile subsequently until 1998, when she played Violet in the Prasanna Vithanage film Pavuru Walalu.

The role won her international acclaim, netting her a Best Actress Award at the 1998 International Singapore Film Festival. the Vishwa Kirthie award, the Presidential Award, the Critics Award in 1999, and the OCIC Award for Best Actress in 2000 in Sri Lanka.

In 2020, she won the Best Actress award at the 2019 Nice International Film Festival in France.

== Filmography ==
Key
†	Denotes films that have not yet been released

Year	Film	Role	Ref.
1965	Landaka Mahima	Latha	
1965	Sathutai Kandului		
1966	Layata Laya		
1968	Ruhunu Kumari		
1969	Pickpocket	Menika	
1969	Hari Maga	Daya	
1969	Mee Masso		
1970	Geetha	Champa	
1971	Ran Onchilla		
1971	Kesara Sinhayo	Shyama	
1971	Bindunu Hadawath		
1971	Samanala Kumariyo		
1972	Sujeewa	Suramya	
1973	Matara Achchi	Kanthi	
1973	Sunethra	Samanthi	
1974	Hadawath Naththo		
1974	Shanthi		
1974	Duppathage Hithawatha	Doctor Rupa	
1974	Lasanda	Lasanda	
1974	Wasthuwa		
1974	Sagarika		
1975	Hitha Honda Minihek	Film actress	
1975	Raththaran Amma	Charitha's girlfriend	
1975	Kaliyudga Kale		
1975	Kohoma Kiyannada	Sheela	
1975	Cyril Malli		
1975	Lassana Kella	Chitra	
1975	Kokilayo		
1975	Rajagedara Paraviyo		
1975	Jeewana Geethaya		
1976	Wasana	Sudam's sister	
1976	Duhulu Malak	Nilupa Suraweera	
1976	Asha		
1976	Haaratha Hathara		
1976	Hariyata Hari	Kusuma	
1976	Onna Mame Kella Panapi		
1976	Deviyange Theenduwa	Shanthi Ranatunga	
1976	Mangala		
1977	Hithuwakkarayo		
1979	Visihathara Peya	Sumana	
1981	Sooriyakantha	Soba	
1997	Pavuru Valalu	Violet	
2000	Saroja	Varuni's mother	
2003	Bheeshanaye Athuru Kathawak	Mrs. Somadasa	
2006	Samaara		
2007	Nisala Gira	Radha	
2010	Bambara Walalla	Podi Eka's mother	
2014	Rassa Kale		
2014	Que Sera		
2014	Thanha Rathi Ranga	Chandare's mother	
2014	Swaroopa		
2014	Parapura	Kanthi	
2016	Paththini	Chithrapathi	
2016	Sakkarang		
2017	Kaala	Henchman's mother	
2020	Paangshu	Babanona	
2022	Praana	Nun	
2023	Swara		
2024	Kambili	Lalitha Amma	
2025	Theja	Theja	
TBA	Magam Soli †		
TBA	Agnika †		

== Awards ==
- Vishwa Kirthie Award - Sri Lanka Government
- Kala Suri Award- Sri Lanka Government
- 1998 - Best Actress - International Singapore Film Festival
- 2018 - Sumathi Life time Award
- 2020 - Best Actress Nice Film Festival France
- 2020 - Best Actress - Indus Valley International Awards
- 2019 - Life time Achievement Award 19th Presidential Awards
- 2019 - Best Actress - 20th Presidential Awards
- 2019 - Best Actress - 35th Sarasaviya Awards
- 2026 - Lester James Priers Lifetime Award - 37th Sarasaviya Awards
