= 20th Presidential Awards =

- Date: November 14, 2023
- Site: Nelum Pokuna Mahinda Rajapaksa Theatre, Colombo 07, Sri Lanka
- Hosted by: Saman Athaudahetti
- Produced by: Sri Lanka Film Corporation

Highlights
- Best Picture: Ginnen Upan Seethala and The Newspaper
- Most awards: 2019 – Ginnen Upan Seethala 11 Awards; 2020 – The Newspaper (film) 10 Awards

The 20th Presidential Awards festival (Sinhala: 20 වැනි ජනාධිපති සම්මාන උලෙළ), presented by the Sri Lanka Film Corporation with the collaboration of the Presidential Secretariat (Sri Lanka) of Sri Lanka and the Ministry of Media, was held on November 14, 2023, at the Nelum Pokuna Mahinda Rajapaksa Theatre, Colombo 07, Sri Lanka. His Excellency The President Ranil Wickramasinghe was the chief guest at the awards night.

The event, which was not held since 2019 due to the COVID-19 pandemic, handed over 53 awards after reviewing 42 films screened in 2019 and 2020.

== Special awards ==
Uga Abimani Swarna Sinha Award

- Cyrl Wikrama
- Chandram Rathnam
- Swenetha Weerasinghe

== 2019 awards ==
Category	Film	Recipient
Best Film	Ginnen Upan Seethala	Chamathka Peris
Best Direction	Ginnen Upan Seethala	Anuruddha Jayasinghe
Best Script	Ginnen Upan Seethala	Ariyawansha Dannage
Best Actor	Ginnen Upan Seethala	Kamal Addararachchi
Best Actress	Dekala Purudu Kenek	Samadhi Laksiri
Best Supporting Actor	Thaala	Priyantha Sirikumara
Best Supporting Actress	Ginnen Upan Seethala	Dilhani Ekanayake
Best Cinematographer	Vishama Bhaga	Palitha Perera
Best Lyricist	Vishama Bhaga	Lalith Rathnayaka
Best Music Director	Ginnen Upan Seethala	Nadeeka Guruge
Best Song	Thaala - Kan Kan buru	Chinthaka Jayakodi
Best Playback Singer	Ginnen Upan Seethala	Nawarathna Gamage
Best Playback Songstress	Ginnen Upan Seethala	Umaria Sinhawansa
Best Editor	Ginnen Upan Seethala	Ravindra Guruge
Best Sound Designer		
Best Art Director	Wishama Bhaga	Sampath Wanniarachchi
Best Make-up Artist	Ginnen Upan Seethala	Naradha Thotagamuwa
Best Actor in a Comedy Role		
Best Upcoming Actor	Ginnen Upan Seethala	Susan Kahandawa
Best Film	Ginnen Upan Seethala	
Maximum Audience Response	Wijayaba Kollaya	Rs 115.91 Mn
Special Jury Awards	Wijayaba Kollaya	Hemal Ranasinghe

== 2020 awards ==
Category	Film	Recipient
Best Film	The Newspaper	
Best Direction	Paangshu	Vishakesa Chandrasekharam
Best Script	Paangshu	Vishakesa Chandrasekharam
Best Actor	The Newspaper	Kumara Thirimadura
Best Actress	Paangshu	Nita Fernando
Best Supporting Actor	Paangshu	Jagath Manuwarna
Best Supporting Actress	Paangshu	Nadee Kammallaweera
Best Cinematographer	The Newspaper	Chandani Jayasinghe
Best Lyricist	The Newspaper	Sunil Ariyarathna
Best Music Director	The Newspaper	Gayathri Kemadasa
Best Song	The Newspaper	Sunil Ariyarathna
Best Playback Singer	Tsunami	Harshana Dissanayake
Best Playback Songstress	The Newspaper	Nanda Malini
Best Editor	The Newspaper	Rukmal Nirosh
Best Sound Designer	Tsunami	Arunu Priyantha Kaluarachchi
Best Art Director	The newspaper	Ajantha Alahakoon
Best Make-up Artist	Tsunami	Vidura Abeydeera
Best Actor in a Comedy Role		
Best Upcoming Actor	Panshuu	Xavier Kanishka
Best Upcoming Actress	The Newspaper	Mashi Siriwardane
Maximum Audience Response	Tsunami	Rs 82.83 Mn
Special Jury Awards	Tsunami	Menara Weeratunga
