= T. M. Jayaratne =

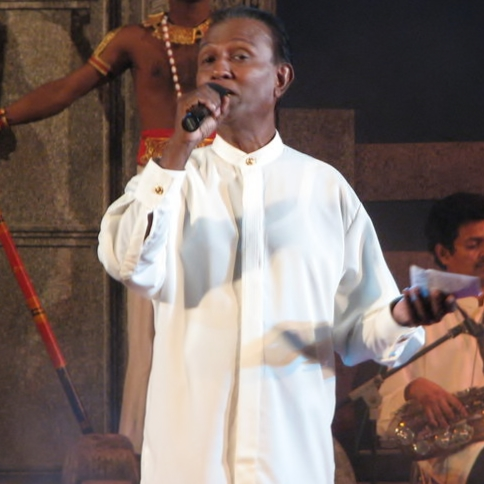

Background information
- Birth name: Tennakoon Mudiyanselage Jayaratne
- Born: 13 April 1944 (age 81)
- Origin: Dodanwala, Sri Lanka
- Genres: Sri Lankan music
- Occupations: Vocalist, Violinist, Music teacher
- Years active: 1970 – Present

Tennakoon Mudiyanselage Jayaratne, commonly known as T. M. Jayaratne (Sinhala: ටි. එම්. ජයරත්න), born 13 April 1944 in Dodanwala, Sri Lanka is a popular Sri Lankan vocalist and a violinist.

He has received the Presidential Award of Sri Lanka in 1978, 1979, 1980 and 1987. In 2006 Jayaratne was awarded the best male singer award at the Raigam Tele Award Festival.

== Life and career ==
=== Overview ===
Jayaratne studied at St. Anthony's College, Kandy and Maliyadeva College in Kurunegala. He was drawn into singing by the head of the Folk and Research unit at the Broadcasting Corporation C.J.S. Kulathilaka who asked him to vocalise several Sinhala folk songs that included "Gana Thel Sadun" to be broadcast over the radio. He recorded his first song in 1970.

Jayaratne debuted as a playback singer with "Lahiru Dahasak" written by Sunil Ariyarathne and composed by Premasiri Khemadasa. In 1978 he released his first cassette Tharanga Volume - 01. At present, he has given his golden voice to 79 films. Among these films, Bambaru Awith of Dharmasena Pathiraja and Hansa Vilak of Dharmasiri Bandaranayake are considered one of the best-ever films in Sri Lankan history.

In 1980 Jayaratne dueted with Sunila Abeysekera on "Hemin Sare Piya Vida" for the movie Hansa Vilak. The song was written by Dharmasena Pathiraja with music by Premasiri Khemadasa and became a popular song in Sri Lanka. His duets with Neela Wickramasinghe also became hugely popular hits. Also he has composed music for some songs but he achieved fame as a talented vocalist.

=== Personal life ===
Jayaratne is married to Malini Jayaratne and has two children. His son Isuru Jayarathne is also a singer.
