= Motor Bicycle =

Motor Bicycle මෝටර් බයිසිකල්
- Film Poster
- Directed by: Shameera Rangana Naotunna
- Written by: Shameera Rangana Naotunna
- Produced by: Suranga Jayasooriya Maharaja Entertainments
- Starring: Dasun Pathirana; Samanalee Fonseka; Veena Jayakody
- Cinematography: Vishwajith Karunarathne
- Edited by: Thissa Surendra
- Music by: Ajith Kumarasiri
- Distributed by: CEL Circuit Cinemas
- Release date: 26 August 2016
- Running time: 124 minutes
- Country: Sri Lanka
- Language: Sinhala

Motor Bicycle (Sinhala: මෝටර් බයිසිකල්) is a 2016 Sri Lankan romantic action drama film written and directed by Shameera Rangana Naotunna as his maiden cinematic direction. Film produced by Suranga Jayasuriya for Imagery Films and Roy Brothers. Film starring Dasun Pathirana, Samanalee Fonseka in lead roles along with Veena Jayakody, Mahendra Perera and Kumara Thirimadura in supportive role., it is set in modern-day urban Colombo and focuses on a boy dreams to ride a motor bicycle with his love. It is the 1256th Sri Lankan film in the Sinhala cinema.

In 2015, the film won the Best Film award and the Best Direction award at 2015 SAARC Film Festival.

== Plot ==
Rangana is a 26 years old boy. His first ambition is to become a singer. Second ambition is to buy a motor bicycle. He lives with his mother. Mother is doing a small business to carry out their lives. Rangana plays a guitar in a club. He dreams to ride a motor bicycle with his girlfriend. His music is a headache to the neighbors. With all these problems, he continued his musical practice.

He forces her to sell her golden necklace to buy a motor bicycle for him. Mother accepts the request of her son reluctantly for the sake of his son's happiness. He buys a used motor bicycle which has been stolen from someone.

== Cast ==
- Dasun Pathirana as Rangana
- Samanalee Fonseka as Tania
- Veena Jayakody as Rangana's mother
- Mahendra Perera as Manju
- Kumara Thirimadura as Three wheel driver
- Kalana Gunasekara as Jimma
- Nethalie Nanayakkara as Patta's mother
- Dimuthu Chinthaka as Police officer
- Chamara Priyadarshana as Chamara
- Chamal Ranasinghe as Sudda
- Shalitha Gunawardena as Shalitha
- Chandana Weerasinghe as Oscar
- Lasantha Udukumbura as Mayya

== Reception ==
The film received praise from critics for the performance of film cast. Cinematographer, editor and music composer of the film is well praised for their contribution. Some critics opined that Motor Bicycle did not perform well in the end of the film.

== Awards and nominations ==
Award	Category	Recipient(s)	Result
2015 SAARC Film Festival	Best Film	Motor Bicycle	Won
2015 SAARC Film Festival	Best Director	Shameera Rangana Naotunna	Won
2015 SAARC Film Festival	Best Director	Shameera Rangana Naotunna	Won
34th Sarasaviya Awards	Best Film	Motor Bicycle	Won
34th Sarasaviya Awards	Best Actor in a Leading Role	Dasun Pathirana	Won
34th Sarasaviya Awards	Best Editing	Tissa Surendra	Won
34th Sarasaviya Awards	Best Music Direction	Ajith Kumarasiri	Won
34th Sarasaviya Awards	Best Lyrics	Shameera Rangana Naotunna	Won
34th Sarasaviya Awards	Best Male Playback Singer	Ajith Kumarasiri for 'Ammage Male'	Won
2017 Derana Film Awards	Best Director	Shameera Rangana Naotunna	Won
2017 Derana Film Awards	Special Jury Award	Samanalee Fonseka	Won
2017 Derana Film Awards	Best Playback Singer (male)	Ajith Kumarasiri	Won
2017 Derana Film Awards	Best Cinematography	Vishwajith Karunarathne	Won
2017 Derana Film Awards	Best Editor	Tissa Surendra	Won
2017 Derana Film Awards	Best Sound Effects	Aruna Priyantha Kaluarachchi	Won
2017 Derana Film Awards	Best Music Direction	Ajith Kumarasiri	Won
Presidential Film Awards 2019 for 2016	Merit Award	Kalana Gunasekara	Won
Presidential Film Awards 2019 for 2016	Special Jury Award	Samanalee Fonseka	Won
Presidential Film Awards 2019 for 2016	Best Melody	Ajith Kumarasiri - for ‘Ammage Male’	Won
Presidential Film Awards 2019 for 2016	Best Playback Singer (male)	Ajith Kumarasiri - for ‘Ammage Male’	Won
Presidential Film Awards 2019 for 2016	Best Actress in a Supporting Role	Veena Jayakody	Won
Presidential Film Awards 2019 for 2016	Best Actor in a Leading Role	Dasun Pathirana	Won
Presidential Film Awards 2019 for 2016	Best Editing	Tissa Surendra	Nominated
Presidential Film Awards 2019 for 2016	Best Art Direction	Rangana Senanayake	Nominated
Presidential Film Awards 2019 for 2016	Best Lyrics	Shameera Rangana Naotunna for ‘Heenath Aran Enna’	Nominated
Presidential Film Awards 2019 for 2016	Best Playback Singer (female)	Lakruwani Rosairo for 'Heenath Aran Enna’	Nominated
Presidential Film Awards 2019 for 2016	Best Music Direction	Ajith Kumarasiri	Nominated
Presidential Film Awards 2019 for 2016	Best Cinematography	Vishwajith Karunarathne	Nominated
Presidential Film Awards 2019 for 2016	Best Screenplay	Shameera Rangana Naotunna	Nominated
Presidential Film Awards 2019 for 2016	Best Direction	Shameera Rangana Naotunna	Nominated
Presidential Film Awards 2019 for 2016	Best Film	Motor Bicycle	Nominated

== Soundtracks ==
Motor Bicycle

Soundtrack album by Ajith Kumarasiri
- Released: 2016
- Genre: Feature film soundtrack
- Length: 10:13

The soundtrack of the film is composed by Ajith Kumarasiri, with lyrics written by Shameera Rangana Naotunna, Upul Shantha Sannasgala and Ajith Kumarasiri.

=== Track listing ===
No.	Title	Singer(s)	Length
1.	"Heenath Aran Enna"	Lakruwani Rosairo, Manoj Fernando, Ajith Kumarasiri	2:38
2.	"Ira Payanawa"	Manoj Fernando	4:31
3.	"Ammage Male"	Ajith Kumarasiri	3:04
