= Umali Thilakarathne =

Sri Lankan actress

උමාලී තිලකරත්න
- Born: Irudini Umali Thilakaratne; 16 March 1987 (age 39); Sri Lanka
- Occupation: Actress
- Years active: 2001-present

Irudini Umali Thilakarathna (Sinhala: උමාලී තිලකරත්න) is a Sri Lankan cinema, teledrama and stage actress. She was awarded the best actress in 2017 for her role in "Bohimiyanuwa" in both Sumathi Tele Awards and Raigam Tele Awards. In addition to working in Sri Lanka, she is an established and recognised actress in Japan, frequently contributing to Japanese production in both theatre and film.

== Personal life ==
Umali was married to Sri Lankan actor Saranga Disasekara, they divorced in 2018.

== Filmography ==
Key
†	Denotes films that have not yet been released

Year	Title	Role	Language	Notes
2001	Rosa Wasanthe	Hansamali's sister	Sinhala	
2003	Mother Teresa of Calcutta	Maggy	English	
2007	Asai Man Piyabanna	Pabalu	Sinhala	
2012	The Final Judgement (ja)		Japanese	
2015	Maharaja Gemunu	Elara's daughter, Shardha	Sinhala	
2015	Equals	Alice	English	
2017	Nino Live	Ruchi	Sinhala	
2017	Heena Hoyana Samanallu	Village teacher	Sinhala	
2017	A Level	Parami	Sinhala	
2020	Rookada Panchi	Aunt	Sinhala	
2024	Sihina Nelum Mal	Kumari	Sinhala	
TBA	Thanapathilage Gedara †		Sinhala	
TBA	Shesha †		Sinhala	
TBA	Latha †	Latha walpola		
TBA	Kollek †			
TBA	Samaharu saha samagama		Sinhala	
TBA	Emali		Sinhala	
TBA	Sigiri		Sinhala	
TBA	May Mara Prasangaya	Sancharani	Sinhala	

=== Short films ===
- Miss You (2022)
- Moment (2021)
- Alice - Christmas Tele Film (2021)

== Teledramas ==
- Arungal
- Bohimiyanuwa
- LBW
- Maha Polowa
- Pithru
- Sakarma
- Sansararanya Asabada
- Sandawatha Seya
- See Raja
- Senehase Geethaya
- Baddegama
- Api

== Awards ==
Year	Award	Work	Category	Result
2017	Sumathi Awards	Bohimiyanuwa	Best Actress	Won
2017	Raigam Tele'es	Bohimiyanuwa	Best Actress	Won
2017	Signis Awards	Bohimiyanuwa	Best Actress	Won
2017	Signia Awards	Pujasanaya	Jury awards	
2018	Derana Film Awards	A Level	Best Supporting Actress	Won
2018	Hiru Golden Film Awards	A Level	Best Supporting Actress	Won
2019	State Awards	Nino Live	Best Playback singer	Won
2022	Sumathi Awards	Sakarma	Best Actress	Won
2022	Raigam Tele'es	Pithru	Best Actress	Won
2024	State Television Award	Api	Best Actress	Won
2026	Popular Awards	Baddegama	Best Actress	Won
2024	Signis Awards	Sihina nelum mal	Best Supporting Actress	Won
2025	Sarasaviya Awards	theja	Jury awards singing	won
