= Gharasarapa =

Gharasarapa ඝරසරප
- promotional poster
- Directed by: Jayantha Chandrasiri
- Written by: Jayantha Chandrasiri
- Produced by: Isuru Films
- Starring: Jackson Anthony; Kamal Addararachchi; Sangeetha Weeraratne; Devnaka Porage; Kavindya Adhikari; Sriyantha Mendis
- Cinematography: Prabath Roshan
- Edited by: Dilan Gunawardhana
- Music by: Chintaka Jayakody
- Production company: Kulneth Media
- Release date: 10 August 2018
- Country: Sri Lanka
- Language: Sinhala

Gharasarapa (The Lurking Serpent) (Sinhala: ඝරසරප ) is a 2018 Sri Lankan Sinhala supernatural romantic horror film directed by Jayantha Chandrasiri and produced by Arjuna Kamalanath for Isuru Films. It stars Jackson Anthony, Kamal Addararachchi and Sangeetha Weeraratne in lead roles along with Sriyantha Mendis, Devnaka Porage and Kavindya Adikari. Music composed by Chintaka Jayakody. Kavindya Adikari, who is the daughter of popular singers Samitha Mudunkotuwa and Athula Adhikari make her debut cinema acting with the film.

The film was screened at the Tharangani Theatre at the National Film Corporation on 29 June 2018. The film was officially released on 10 August 2018. It is the 1310th Sri Lankan film in the Sinhala cinema.

== Plot ==
In the 1980, A Sinhala boy, Sandares Edirisinghe (Devnaka Porage), and a Tamil girl, Vidya (Kavindya Adhikari), fall in love (It's love at first sight) on their way to the church at Gadagama. The girl, possessed by the Kalu Kumaraya (Jackson Anthony) (Sri Lankan folklore version of Incubus), can only be healed by Rev. Camilus Dabare (Shriyantha Mendis). Gharasarpa finds it hard to possess the girl because she has already fallen for Sandaras, proven true love can defeat the Gharasarpa (demonic possession). As Vidya has fully recovered, they leave the church after sharing postal addresses, hinting they will meet here after. In such a date in a cinema hall, Vidya informed because of the upcoming events of Sri Lankan Civil War in 80s, her family is forced to leave the country to settle in Canada. Because she is unable to leave Sandares, Vidya asked Sandaras to marry her. As he is just a 19-year-old school boy (Vidya was 18 years old by then) Sandares shows hesitation towards the marriage. Somehow Vidya left the country and settled in Canada, and few years later become a psychiatrist and married a Tamil doctor.

Kalu Kumaraya reaches Sandaras in an unexpected moment and convey the news that Vidya now is in Canada but promise Sandares, if she ever returns to the motherland he will definitely make them meet.

=== 37 years later ===
Dr. Vidya Doraiappa returned Sri Lanka. As per the promise given by Kalu Kumaraya, he is in a mission to make former lovers meet. In that mission Ghrasarpa may turn Sandares's usual routine happy marriage life up side down.

== Cast ==
- Jackson Anthony as Gharasarapa aka Kalu Kumara
- Kamal Addararachchi as Sandares Edirisinghe
  - Devnaka Porage as Teenage Sandares Edirisinghe
- Sangeetha Weeraratne as Dr. Vidya Doraiappa
  - Kavindya Adhikari as Teeange Vidya
- Sriyantha Mendis as Rev.Fr. Camilus Dabare (in 1980)
- Kusum Renu as Vidya's mother (in 1980)
- Ameesha Kavindi as Frankie Edirisinghe, Sandares's wife (in 2017)
- Yashoda Wimaladharma (guest appearance)
- Wasantha Wittachchi as Vishwanadan, Vidya's father (in 1980)
- Jayanath Bodahandi
- Aishara Athukorale as Shalika
- Rajitha Hiran
- Anura Dharmasiriwardena as Jehan
- Senaka Titus

== Soundtrack ==
No.	Title	Lyrics	Singer(s)	Length
1.	"Hama Deyak Pene"	Jayantha Chandrasiri	Bachi Susan, Samitha Mudunkotuwa
2.	"Kalu Kumara"	Jayantha Chandrasiri	Dumal Warnakulasuriya
