= Sakkarang =

- promotional poster
- Directed by: Dharmasena Pathiraja
- Screenplay by: Chamminda Welagedara
- Story by: Chamminda Welagedera
- Based on: Novel of Chamminda Welagedara by same name
- Produced by: Cine Sarasavi
- Starring: Bimal Jayakody; Prasidini Athapaththu; Pubudu Chathuranga
- Cinematography: Donald Karunarathne
- Edited by: Elmo Haliday
- Music by: Nadeeka Guruge
- Release date: 22 April 2016
- Running time: 117 min
- Country: Sri Lanka
- Language: Sinhala

Sakkarang is a 2016 Sri Lankan historical film drama directed by Daramasena Pathiraja and produced by H. D. Premasiri for Cine Sarasavi. It stars Bimal Jayakody and Prasidini Athapaththu in lead roles, accompanied by Pubudu Chathuranga and Nita Fernando. Music composed of Nadeeka Guruge.

== Cast ==
- Bimal Jayakody as Sube
- Prasidini Athapaththu as Rathi
- Pubudu Chathuranga as Milton
- Nita Fernando
- Darshani Athapaththu
- Cyril Wickramage as Pitawela Gurun
- Chamila Peiris
- Gayan Wickramathilake as Basnayake Nilame
- Sarath Kothalawala as Dingiri Banda
- Shyam Fernando as Monk Rathnapala
- Thusitha Laknath as Rana
- W. Jayasiri as Jeramias
- Lakshman Mendis as Arachchila
- Shamila Nimanthi Fernando as Jayani
- Anura Bandara Rajaguru as Weda rala
- D.B. Gangodathenna

== Synopsis ==
The film follows the story of a community of traditional dancers who lived in the hinterland of colonial Ceylon. Their duty is to perform in the annual festival of the Temple of the Tooth Relic. The narrative, which has a romantic and lyrical style, is set between two rebellions against colonial rule. It concerns the story of Sube, the chief dancer (Bimal) and Rathi, his enterprising wife (Prasidini). Their story charts the struggle of this marginal and oppressed caste community for its roots, rights, heritage and place in the world, while the country is going through a tortuous transformation from feudalism to modernity.
