= National Film Corporation of Sri Lanka =

Sri Lankan state body for film regulation

- ශ්‍රී ලංකා ජාතික චිත්‍රපට සංස්ථාව
- Abbreviation: NFC
- Formation: 1971
- Type: State-owned corporation
- Purpose: Regulation, promotion, and development of the film industry
- Headquarters: 303, Bauddhaloka Mawatha, Colombo 00700, Sri Lanka
- Coordinates: 6°54′05″N 79°51′57″E
- Chairman: W. Prince Senadeera
- Parent organization: Ministry of Mass Media

The National Film Corporation of Sri Lanka (NFC) (Sinhala: ශ්‍රී ලංකා ජාතික චිත්‍රපට සංස්ථාව) is a state-owned entity established to regulate, promote, and develop the film industry in Sri Lanka. Founded under the National Film Corporation of Sri Lanka Act No. 47 of 1971 and amended by Act No. 45 of 1980, the NFC serves as the primary authority for overseeing film production, distribution, and exhibition in the country. Headquartered in Colombo, the corporation plays a pivotal role in fostering the growth of Sri Lankan cinema, managing foreign film productions, and supporting local filmmakers.

== History ==
The NFC was established in 1971 under Act No. 47, with operations commencing on 21 January 1972, initially as the State Film Corporation, to centralise control over the film industry, a vital cultural and economic sector. The 1980 amendment renamed it the National Film Corporation of Sri Lanka and expanded its regulatory powers, including oversight of cinemas and studios. During the 1970s, the NFC significantly boosted local cinema by providing interest-free loans to filmmakers, contributing to a boom in Sinhala-language films. However, challenges such as the partial privatisation of film distribution in 2001, civil unrest, and economic difficulties have impacted its influence over time.

In 2001, the NFC liberalised film distribution, allowing private entities like Lanka Film Distributors Ltd. (LFD), E.A.P. Films and Theatres Ltd. (EAP), Movie Producers and Importers Ltd. (MPI), and Cinema Entertainment Ltd. (CEL) to operate alongside its own distribution unit, Rithma Enterprise. This aimed to address the decline in cinema halls but led to conflicts with stakeholders over strategic decisions, as highlighted in a 2017 study by Nanayakkara and Jayatilaka.

Recent years have seen the NFC grappling with financial irregularities and operational inefficiencies. A 2021 report by the Sunday Times revealed losses due to unrecorded loans of Rs. 70.13 million granted to film directors and a write-off of Rs. 8.2 million. In response, the government introduced reforms in 2024, including new leadership and an expert committee to overhaul film distribution practices, aiming for greater transparency and competitiveness.

== Objectives ==
The NFC's general objectives, as outlined in the 1971 Act, include:

- Import and export: Managing the import of films, photographic equipment, and materials, and exporting Sri Lankan films to global markets.
- Distribution and supply: Overseeing the distribution of films and related equipment within Sri Lanka.
- Production support: Providing financial and technical assistance for local film production, including co-productions.
- Industry development: Promoting high standards in film making through awards, festivals, and training programs.
- Market expansion: Conducting research to enhance the demand for Sri Lankan films domestically and internationally.
- Regulation: Controlling the establishment, operation, and safety standards of cinemas and studios.

== Powers and functions ==
The NFC holds extensive powers under the 1971 Act, including:

- Regulatory authority: Exclusive rights to approve and supervise film production, distribution, and exhibition, including foreign film projects in Sri Lanka.
- Property management: Acquiring and managing property for film-related purposes, such as studios and cinemas.
- Financial operations: Levying fees, providing credit facilities, and managing funds for industry development.
- Training and welfare: Establishing training institutions for technicians and artists and maintaining welfare programs for employees.

The corporation operates under the guidance of the Minister of Media, with a board of directors comprising ex-official members (e.g., Director of Information, Director of Cultural Affairs) and appointed experts. The chairman serves as the chief executive officer.

== Foreign film production guidelines ==
The NFC is the sole authority for granting permission to foreign nationals filming in Sri Lanka, as detailed in its 2018 guidelines. Key requirements include:

- Script approval: Submission of scripts or storyboards for review, with fees ranging from Rs. 25,000 for documentaries to Rs. 150,000 for feature films.
- Local collaboration: Engagement of a professional local production company or fixer.
- Permits and visas: Obtaining NFC permits and media visas, with additional approvals required for sensitive locations like archaeological sites or wildlife areas.
- Monitoring: An NFC officer may accompany crews, with costs borne by the production company.
- Content review: All footage must be previewed by the NFC or a Sri Lankan mission abroad before public release to ensure compliance with national interests.

Co-productions require at least 50% of technicians and artists to be Sri Lankan, and financial declarations must detail foreign exchange components.

== Challenges and criticisms ==
The NFC has faced significant challenges, including:

- Financial irregularities: Allegations of unrecoverable loans and mismanagement, as noted in a 2021 Auditor General's report, have strained its finances.
- Monopoly criticism: Stakeholders have criticised the NFC's dominant role in distribution, arguing it stifled quality content and discouraged cinema attendance. A 2019 gazette reaffirmed its control, deterring foreign studios.
- Strategic conflicts: A 2017 qualitative study highlighted conflicts over pricing, profit-sharing, merging practices, and film removal strategies, which disadvantaged producers and exhibitors.
- Industry decline: The closure of hundreds of cinemas post-2001, coupled with socio-political upheavals (e.g., the 1987–1989 JVP insurrection, the North-East war, and the Easter Sunday attacks), weakened the film-going culture.

== Recent reforms ==
In 2024, the government initiated significant reforms to address these issues:

- New leadership: On 18 October 2024, a new board of directors was appointed for the NFC, chaired by W. Prince Senadeera, with members including Wimalarathna Adikari, Gamini Waleboda, Samantha Perera, Saman Athauda, Tharindu Ranathunga, and Dr. Priyantha Kaluarachchi. This restructuring aimed to enhance transparency and fairness in film distribution and address past mismanagement.
- Expert committee: On 28 July 2024, an expert committee was formed to revamp the NFC's film distribution system. The committee, chaired by Dr. Damith Gangodawilage and including members like Suminda Weerasinghe, was tasked with replacing the restrictive distribution model with a freer, more innovative system to benefit stakeholders and encourage industry growth.
- Legislative updates: The Cabinet approved amendments to the 1971 Act to modernise the NFC's framework, aligning it with contemporary industry standards and addressing outdated regulatory practices.
- Support initiatives: Despite financial constraints, the NFC provided Rs. 100,000 grants to cinema halls affected by the COVID-19 pandemic and Rs. 5,000 monthly allowances for artists to mitigate economic hardships.

Stakeholders have urged the NFC to transition into a regulatory body, allowing private distributors to operate without bureaucratic constraints and supporting cinema hall owners in diversifying their businesses.

== Impact on Sri Lankan cinema ==
The NFC has been instrumental in shaping Sri Lankan cinema, particularly during the 1970s when it supported acclaimed filmmakers. However, its monopoly and strategic missteps have contributed to the industry's struggles. Partial liberalisation in 2001 spurred private investment, but the NFC's continued control has limited growth. The corporation's efforts to promote Tamil cinema and co-productions aim to diversify the industry, though Tamil cinema remains underdeveloped.
