= Nino Live =

- official poster
- Directed by: Thisara Imbulana
- Written by: Thisara Imbulana
- Produced by: Sahil Gupta; Thisara Imbulana
- Starring: Nino Jayakodi; Yureni Noshika; Dasun Pathirana; Umali Thilakarathne
- Cinematography: Channa Deshapriya
- Edited by: Duminda De Silva
- Music by: Sanka Dineth
- Distributed by: MPI Theatres
- Release dates: 2 November 2011 (Australia); 26 May 2017 (Sri Lanka)
- Country: Sri Lanka
- Language: Sinhala

Nino Live is a 2011 Sri Lankan Sinhala comedy romance film directed by Thisara Imbulana and produced by Sahil Gupta. It stars Nino Jayakodi and Yureni Noshika in lead roles along with Dasun Pathirana and Umali Thilakarathne. Music composed by Sanka Dineth.

== Plot ==
“Every man is surrounded by a neighbourhood of voluntary spies.” – George Washington Spying has always claimed the highest position in the hierarchy of human behaviour. And thus it forms the crux of the film “Nino Live”. Based in the modern age, the film shows how an entire life can go public in this era of wires and networks. The film revolves around the journey of a child from adolescence to early manhood, all caught on celluloid. Ripping off his personal domain, his existence is dished out in the form of unedited footage, broadcast live 24/7 on television. This gigantic show, named “Nino Live”, becomes a way of life for thousands of reality TV struck fans around the country.

== Cast ==
- Nino Jayakodi as Nino
- Yureni Noshika as Nunu1
- Dasun Pathirana as Nishantha
- Umali Thilakarathne as Ruchi
- Steve De La Zilwa as Nonis
- Ruchi Disanayake as Nunu2
- Chandani Seneviratne as Nimmi
- Thusitha Laknath as Viraj
- Bandula Vithanage as Nino's Grandfather
- Kingsley Rathnayake
- Jagath Manuwarna

== Soundtrack ==
No.	Title	Lyrics	Singer(s)	Length
1.	"Obe Adare (female version)"	Ravinatha Jayasuriya	Umali Thilakaratne
2.	"Mudu Dangakara"	Amila Sandaruwan	Amila Sandaruwan
3.	"Obe Adare (male version)"	Ravinatha Jayasuriya	Sanka Dineth
4.	"Wada Didi"	Nandana Wickramage	Sanka Dineth
5.	"Sanda Eliyen"	Chinthaka Dharmadasa	Nuwan Eranga
6.	"Duhul Thusharayen"	Ravinatha Jayasuriya	Sanka Dineth
