= Frangipani (film) =

- Sinhala: සය පෙති කුසුම
- Directed by: Visakesa Chandrasekaram
- Written by: Visakesa Chandrasekaram
- Produced by: Sunil T Films; Havelock Arts
- Starring: Dasun Pathirana; Jehan Sri Kanth; Yasodha Rasanduni
- Cinematography: Kularuwan Gamage
- Edited by: Sithum Samarajeewa
- Music by: Shantha Pieris
- Release date: 21 October 2016
- Country: Sri Lanka
- Language: Sinhala

Frangipani (Sayapethi Kusuma) (Sinhala: සය පෙති කුසුම) is a 2016 Sri Lankan Sinhala romantic drama film directed and co-produced by Sunil T. Fernando for Sunil T Films and Visakesa Chandrasekaram for Havelock Arts. It stars Dasun Pathirana, Jehan Sri Kanth and Yasodha Rasanduni in lead roles. Music composed by Shantha Pieris. It is the 1260th Sri Lankan film in the Sinhala cinema.

== Plot ==
The film discussed about a new pathway of Sri Lankan society, where a heterosexual woman married a gay man, and breaks the relationship of his bisexual friend.

== Cast ==
- Dasun Pathirana as Chamath
- Jehan Sri Kanth Appuhamy as Nalin
- Yasodha Rasanduni as Sarasi
- Ruwan Malith as Monk Sobhitha
- Kumudu Kumarasinghe as Sarasi's mother
- Ganga Jeewani Waliwatte as Chamath's mother
- Anjana Premaratne as Chamath's brother
- Nishantha Lawrence as Chamath's father
- Nilmini Buwaneka as Teacher
- Kumudu Darshana Kumara as Shehan

== Acclaim ==
It was screened at numerous international film festivals including the Mumbai Queer Film Festival, but has only been shown in two venues in Sri Lanka, where homosexuality is illegal.

The film is Chandrasekaram's feature-length debut. He said in an interview with Fridae that "The film is typical in many ways of the experience of LGBT in Sri Lanka, typical of the experience that I myself had.”

== Soundtrack ==
No.	Title	Singer(s)	Length
1.	"Deneth Are"	Surya Dayaruwan

== Awards and nominations ==
Award	Category	Recipient(s)	Result	Ref
2017 Derana Film Awards	Best Actor	Dasun Pathirana	Won	
2017 Sarasaviya Film Awards	Best Upcoming Actress	Yashoda Rasaduni	Won	
2017 Sarasaviya Film Awards	Best Upcoming Actor	Jehan Srikanth	Won	
