= Devnaka Porage =

Sri Lankan actor

- දෙව්නක පෝරගේ
- Born: Devnaka Namindu Porage; December 17, 1997 (age 28); Colombo, Sri Lanka
- Education: Lyceum International School
- Occupation: Actor
- Years active: 2007–present
- Partner: Hashini Wedanda
- Parents: Dr. Damenda Porage (father); Dr. Shermila Milroy (mother)
- Website: https://www.devnakaporage.com/

Devnaka Namindu Porage (born 17 December 1997 as Sinhala: දෙව්නක පෝරගේ), popularly known as Devnaka Porage, is an actor in Sri Lankan cinema and television. Started as a child artist through several commercial advertisements. Devnaka became a popular actor particularly with the blockbuster film Gharasarapa and television serials Ganga Addara and Sihina Wasanthayak.

== Personal life ==
He was born on 17 December 1997 in Colombo, Sri Lanka as the only child of the family. His father Damenda Porage and mother Shermila Milroy are both educationists by profession. He started primary education from Yoshida International School, Elic International School and then attended Lyceum International School for secondary education. While at Lyceum, he won the school colors in 2014 for his performance in cultural dancing, drama and sports karate. He studied in the Advanced Level Science stream even though he turned to law. Currently, he is following his LLB degree at Buckinghamshire New University.

While he was a student at Elic International School in Mabima, he won the gold medal in the Yellow Belt Kata event at the Colombo Shotokan Karate Tournament 2009. During his secondary school period, he excelled in Itosukai Sports Karate where he started the style in 2010 and won his first gold medal. Then in 2014, he won his second international gold medal in Kata 59 in International Nihon Itosu-kai Tournament held in Soka University, USA. He won the Best Actor award at an international school-level stage drama competition. During two consecutive years 2011 and 2012, Devnaka won the national colors in cultural dancing by winning the first place in interschool national level cultural dancing competition. In 2011, he again won the first place in "male Kadu Saramba" and in 2012, won the first place in Folk Dancing Raban in All Sri Lanka Dancing and Drama Competition organized by the Ministry of Education. He also learned Kandyan dancing from Prof. Mudiyanse Dissanayake.

His aunt Nimanthi Porage is a popular actress who dominated theater, television and cinema. Nimanthi is married to popular cinematographer Prabath Roshan.

== Career ==
As a child artist at the age of 7, Devnaka appeared in the television commercial of Vanitha Wasana in 2007 along with Umayangana Wickramasinghe and Upeksha Swarnamali. He got this opportunity through his aunt Nimanthi Porage. Then he continued to appear in several commercials including, Alpenliebe (2008), Britannia Biscuits TVC (2009) with Lasith Malinga, Munchee Super Cream Cracker (2014) and Lipton Laoji (2014) and Sampath X-set (2016). In 2009, he appeared in the commercial for Cargills along with international cricketer Sanath Jayasuriya. In 2008, he made his maiden drama appearance with the television serial Sihina Wasanthayak directed by Sunil Costa. In the serial, he played the childhood role of the lead role 'Nirmal'.

In 2008, Devnaka made his maiden cinema appearance in the sci-fi film Pitasakwala Kumarayai Pancho Hathai directed by Sirimal Wijesinghe. In the film he played a lead role 'Podda' along with several veteran artists such as Suminda Sirisena, Sanath Gunathilake, Dilhani Ekanayake and Janaka Kumbukage. In 2009, he acted in the short film May 20th directed by Reshan Fernando. The film received critics acclaim and entered official selection and Live Screening at 2015 Ozak Short Film Festival, officially selected at International Student Film Festival in 2009 and official selection at Wiper Film Festival 2015 in USA.

In 2009, he acted in the television serial Ganga Addara which was the television adaptation of Sumitra Peries’ film Ganga Addara based on Laticia Boteju's novel. During the same period, he appeared in the serial Gehenu Lamai made as an adaptation of the 1978 blockbuster film Gehenu Lamai directed by Sumitra Peries. In 2010, he played the role as 'young Joseph Vaz' in the docudrama Juse Vaz directed by Sanjaya Nirmal. In 2012, he acted in the serial Bharyawo directed by Saranga Mendis and produced by Sudharma Nettikumara.

In 2018, he appeared in the serial Siddhartha Gauthama produced by his uncle Prabath Roshan. In the same year, he made a lead role in the blockbuster film Gharasarapa directed by Jayantha Chandrasiri. In the film, he played as the young 'Sandares Edirisinghe' with Kavindya Adhikari as 'Vidya'. The film received critics acclaim and awarded in several local film festivals. For his role, Devnaka won the Award for The Best Upcoming Actor at both Lux Derana Film Awards and the Presidential Film Festival. In the same year, he was also nominated as the Best Actor at the SIGNIS International Film Awards for the same role.

In 2019, he joined the cast of the mega teledrama Ahas Maliga. In the same year, he won the Honorary Prize for the year 2019 presented by International Interchange Development Association by appreciating his acting efforts towards well being and making hopes in people's lives through drama.

In 2020 on his birthday, he released the song "Paadaparicharika". In 2020, he appeared in the television mini serial Podu. Since 2019, he has made three more originals: Wishwaye (2019), Pansal (2020) and Ashawiye (2021).

== Television serials ==
Year	Teledrama	Role	Ref.
2008	Sihina Wasanthayak	Nirmal	
2009	Ganga Addara	Ranjith / Nisal	
2009	Gehenu Lamai	Tissa	
2012	Bharyawo	Subhash	
2018	Siddhartha Gauthama	Prince Nanda	
2019	Ahas Maliga	Thejan	
2020	Podu	Dilan	
2022	Hitha Langa Hinehuna	Sihina	
2022	Nannaththara		

== Filmography ==
Year	Film	Role	Ref.
2008	Pitasakwala Kumarayai Pancho Hathai	Podda	
2009	May 20th	Sanuth	
2010	Juse Vaz	young Joseph Vaz	
2018	Gharasarapa	Sandares Edirisinghe	
TBD	Number 9	Sithum	

== Awards ==
=== Derana Film Awards ===
Year	Nominee / work	Award	Result
2018	Gharasarapa	Best Upcoming Actor	Won

=== Presidential Film Awards ===
Year	Nominee / work	Award	Result
2018	Gharasarapa	Best Upcoming Actor	Won

=== SIGNIS International Film Awards ===
Year	Nominee / work	Award	Result
2018	Gharasarapa	Best Actor	Nominated

=== Honorary Awards ===
Year	Nominee / work	Award	Result
2019	Contribution in Acting	Honorary Award	Won
