= Burning Birds =

Burning Birds දැවෙන විහඟුන්
- Directed by: Sanjeewa Pushpakumara
- Written by: Sanjeewa Pushpakumara
- Produced by: Antonin Dedet; Sanjeewa Pushpakumara Renuka Balasooriya
- Starring: Anoma Janadari; Samanalee Fonseka; Mahendra Perera; Dasun Pathirana
- Cinematography: Kalinga Deshapriya Vithanage
- Edited by: Ajith Ramanayake; Katharina Wartena
- Music by: R. Abaji; Philip David Sheppard
- Production companies: Neon Production (France); Sapushpa Expressions (Sri Lanka)
- Release dates: October 2016 (Busan); 29 June 2018 (Sri Lanka)
- Running time: 104 minutes
- Countries: Sri Lanka; France; Qatar; The Netherlands
- Language: Sinhala

Burning Birds (දැවෙන විහඟුන්) is a 2016 Sri Lankan adult drama film written and directed by Sanjeewa Pushpakumara and co-produced by Pushpakumara and Antonin Dedet. It stars Anoma Janadari and Samanalee Fonseka with Mahendra Perera and Shyam Fernando. The music was composed by R. Abaji and Philip David Sheppard. The film was premiered in the main competition of the 21st Busan International Film Festival in 2016.

The film was released in Sri Lanka on 29 June 2018 by the National Film Corporation of Sri Lanka through its Rithma circuit cinemas. The director's cut was released from 26 July 2018 to 9 August 2018 only in three theaters - Regal Colombo, Lido Borella and Skylite Malabe, under the "Adults Only" banner.

The film successfully passed 50 days in theaters. It is the 1307th Sri Lankan film in the Sinhala cinema. With many awards at Derana Film Awards 2019, the film was re-screened in few theaters for a limited engagement including Savoy Premier at 1.30 pm.

== Cast ==
- Samanalee Fonseka as Wasana
- Anoma Janadari as Kusum
- Mahendra Perera as owner of slaughter house
- Chandani Seneviratne as Sumana
- Leonie Kotelawala as mother-in-law/grandmother
- Pubudu Chathuranga as owner of brothel
- Thissa Bandaranayaka as principal
- Shyam Fernando as paramilitary leader
- Sanjeewa Dissanayake as father
- Dasun Pathirana as Bus driver
- Dharmapriya Dias as Police inspector
- D.B. Gangodathenna as Old man at brothel
- Darshan Dharmaraj as animal slaughter

== Awards and nominations ==
- 15th International Film Festival and Forum on Human Rights in Geneva (FIFDH)- (Winner) The Best Film (Grand Prix)
- 15th International Film Festival and Forum on Human Rights in Geneva (FIFDH)- (Winner) Youth Jury Award
- 21st Busan International Film Festival, 2016 – New Currents Competition - (Nominated) The Best Film
- 17th International Film Festival Tokyo Filmex, 2016 – (Winner) Special Jury Prize (the 2nd Prize)
- 46th International Film Festival Rotterdam, 2017 – Bright Future Competition
- 40th Gothenburg Film Festival, 2017 – Ingmar Bergman Competition -(Nominated) The Ingmar Bergman Award
- 27th African, Asian and Latin American Film Festival in Milan-(Nominated)-The Best Film
- 35th Munich International Film Festival
- 32nd Cinema Jove, Valencia International Film Festival (in Competition)
- 3rd Valletta Film Festival
- 5th Lake Como Film Festival (in Competition) - Special Jury Mention (Student Jury)
- 70th Locarno Film Festival
- 14th Anonimul Film Festival (In Competition)
- Asian Film Festival Barcelona
- 13th Kazan International Film Festival, Russia
- 3rd Jafna International Cinema Festival, Sri Lanka
- 5th South Asian Film Festival in Paris - FFAST
- 3rd Asian World Film Festival in Los Angeles - (Winner) Best Actress
- 12th Jogja-Netpac International Film Festival, Indonesia (in competition)
- 16th Pune International Film Festival, India (World Cinema)
- 8th Yashwant International Film Festival, Mumbai, 2018
- Barcelona Asina Film Festival, Spain, 2017
- 9th SAARC Film Festival ( in Competition) - Best Actress & Best Editor (winners)
- Presidential Film Awards (2019), Sri Lanka - Best Film, Best Director, Best Script, Best Actress, Best Actor, Best Supporting Actress
- Derana TV Film Awards (2019), Sri Lanka - Best Director, Best Actress, Best Supporting Actress, Best Supporting Actor, Best Make-up
