= Kaala (2017 film) =

- international poster
- Sinhala: කාල
- Directed by: Sujeewa Gunarathne
- Written by: D K Atigala
- Based on: Legends of God Kadawara
- Produced by: Live Works Creations
- Starring: Mahendra Perera; Madani Malwaththa; W. Jayasiri
- Cinematography: Chandana Jayasinghe
- Edited by: Rangana Sinharage
- Music by: Darshana Ruwan Dssanayaka
- Release date: 27 October 2017
- Running time: 90 minutes
- Country: Sri Lanka
- Language: Sinhala

Kaala (Sinhala: කාල) is a 2017 Sri Lankan Sinhala epic fantasy film directed by Sujeewa Gunarathne and co-produced by director himself with Nadini Bamunusinghe for Live Works Creations. It stars Mahendra Perera and Madani Malwaththa in lead roles along with W. Jayasiri and Nita Fernando. Music composed by Darshana Ruwan Dssanayaka. It is the 1289th Sri Lankan film in the Sinhala cinema.

== Plot ==
The film revolves around the time of King Dhatusena and the way he constructed Kala Wewa. It depicts the chronicles related to the tank and formation of new deity Kadawara.

== Cast ==
- Mahendra Perera as Heen Kurutta Nilame
- Madani Malwaththa as Menika
- W. Jayasiri as Wattaka Nilame
- Achintha Kalana as Kaala
- Soorya Dayaruwan as Prince Kashyapa
- Nita Fernando as Henchman's mother
- Jagath Manuwarna as Wattaka's henchman
- Vishwanath Kodikara as Uththiya
- Chamari Nisansala
- Dayadeva Edirisinghe as King Dhatusena
- Janak Premalal as Heen Kurutta's brother
- Dharmapriya Dias as Wattaka's henchman
- Welegedara Ranasinghe
