= Swaroopa =

Swaroopa ස්වරූප
- Directed by: Dharmasena Pathiraja
- Written by: Dharmasena Pathiraja; Eric Ileyaparachchi
- Based on: The Metamorphosis by Franz Kafka
- Produced by: Dharmasena Pathiraja; Mohan Mabotuwana
- Starring: W. Jayasiri; Nita Fernando; Lakshman Mendis
- Cinematography: Donald Karunaratne
- Edited by: Elmo Haliday
- Music by: Nadeeka Guruge
- Distributed by: Rithma Circuit
- Release date: 29 September 2017
- Country: Sri Lanka
- Language: Sinhala

Swaroopa (Metamorphosis) (Sinhala: ස්වරූප) is a 2017 Sri Lankan Sinhala drama film directed by Dharmasena Pathiraja and co-produced by Dharmasena Pahtiraja himself with Mohan Mabotuwana. It stars W. Jayasiri and Nita Fernando in lead roles along with Thusitha Laknath and Lakshman Mendis. Music composed by Nadeeka Guruge. Newcomer Reeni de Silva debuted in the Sinhala cinema with the film. It is the 1285th Sri Lankan film in the Sinhala cinema.

Though the film scheduled to premier on 8 September 2017 in Rithma circuit theatres, it was delayed to 29 September 2017. The film received positive reviews from critics.

== Plot ==
The story revolves around a middle class businessman Gregory Samson, who took many responsibilities to overcome problems arise with their children and wife.

== Screenings ==
- 2015 International Film Festival of Colombo

== Cast ==
- W. Jayasiri as Gregory Samson
- Nita Fernando
- Lakshman Mendis
- Thusitha Laknath
- Wimal Kumara de Costa
- Chamila Pieris
- Reeni de Silva as Greta
- Daya Thennakoon
- D.B. Gangodathenna
- Vishwajith Gunasekara
- Sangeetha Palliyaguruge
