= Let Her Cry (film) =

- Directed by: Asoka Handagama
- Screenplay by: Asoka Handagama
- Story by: Asoka Handagama
- Produced by: Asoka Jagath Wijenayake
- Starring: Swarna Mallawarachchi; Dhritiman Chatterjee; Sandali Ash; Rithika Kodithuvakku
- Cinematography: Channa Deshapriya
- Edited by: Ravindra Guruge
- Music by: Chitral Somapala
- Release date: May 13, 2016
- Running time: 104 minutes
- Country: Sri Lanka
- Language: Sinhala

Let Her Cry (Sinhala: ඇගේ ඇස අග) is a 2016 Sri Lankan Sinhala romantic drama film directed by Asoka Handagama and produced by Asoka Jagath Wijenayake. It stars Swarna Mallawarachchi, Dritimen Chaterji, Sandali Ash and Rithika Kodithuvakku. Music for the film is done by Chitral Somapala. The movie was screened in November 2015 at the Kolkata International Film Festival.

The film is available to stream on Netflix with a variety of subtitles in 39 countries. The Film won many local awards in Sri Lanka including best film, best director and best actress.

== Cast ==
- Swarna Mallawarachchi
- Dhritiman Chatterjee
- Rithika Kodithuwakku
- Sandali Ash
- Hashinika Karaliyadda
- Thilakshani Rathnayake
- Asoka Zoysa
- King Ratnam
- Keerthi Ranjith Peiris
- Amarapala Karasinghearachchi

== Soundtrack ==
No.	Title	Singer(s)	Length
1.	"Aharenna Ithin Danwath"	Chitral Somapala
2.	"Widuli Kotana Ahasa Wage"	Chithral Somapala
