= Paththini (2016 film) =

- Directed by: Sunil Ariyarathna
- Written by: Sunil Ariyarathna, Ilango Adigal
- Starring: Pooja Umashankar; Uddika Premarathna; Ravindra Randeniya; Lucky Dias, Aruni Rajapaksha
- Cinematography: Channa Deshapriya
- Edited by: Thissa Surendra
- Music by: Rohana Weerasinghe
- Production company: Sumathi Films
- Release date: 5 May 2016
- Running time: 120 minutes
- Language: Sinhala

Paththini (පත්තිනි) is a 2016 Sri Lankan Sinhala-language epic-drama film written and directed by Sunil Ariyarathna and produced by Dr. Milina Sumathipala, co-produced by Jagath Sumathipala and Thilanga Sumathipala on behalf of Sumathi Films. The film features Pooja Umashankar in the title role, Uddika Premarathna in the lead role while Ravindra Randeniya, Lucky Dias, Veena Jayakody, and Aruni Rajapaksha appear in supporting roles. The film is based on the Tamil epic Silappatikaram, written by Ilango Adigal. The film was released on 5 May 2016 in the film halls of the EAP Circuit.

== Plot ==
The film is based on the Tamil epic Silappatikaram written by Ilango Adigal.

More than 2000 years ago, Southern India was divided into three Tamil kingdoms, namely the Chola, Pandya, and Chera dynasties which ruled most of present-day Tamil Nadu and Kerala. Kannagi was born in the city of Puhar in the Chola dynasty. She is married to a rich baron named Kovalan. They lived a beautiful, long married life. Meanwhile, the ceremony of appointing Madhavi as the court dancer of the Chola kingdom was held at this time. Kovalan was also invited to the ceremony among the dignitaries.

After the appointment of Madhavi as the court dancer of the kingdom by the king, he gave her permission to choose anyone as her husband among the dignitaries. Impressing all the participants, Madhavi chose Kovalan as her husband. Kovalan also began to like Madhavi because of her beautiful appearance and her talent. Due to this incident, the beautiful married life between Kannagi and Kovalan had been broken. Kovalan spends all his wealth on Madhavi. Kannagi finds out about Kovalan and Madhavi's relationship and breaks down. After her heartbreak, Kannagi is abused by youngsters. Kovalan's father advises Kannagi to marry someone else, but, due to her chastity, she instead waits for Kovalan to return.

Because of her profession, Madhavi had to entertain the dignitaries who came for her. Her actions are not accepted by Kovalan, who assumes that Madhavi loves someone else. Because of these reasons, disputes had been created among them and Kovalan ends his relationship with Madhavi and reunites with Kannagi. Kannagi forgives him and they live together happily.

But now they are poor because Kovalan had spent all his wealth on Madhavi. After all, they only have Kannagi's golden ruby-encrusted anklets which are valuable and they are subjected to the sight of the people in the city of Puhar. They run away from the Chola kingdom to the Pandya kingdom with the intention of living freely thereby selling Kannagi's golden anklets.

They escaped secretly without others knowing except for Madhavi. She waits for them on the way off with her hostess. They find out that Madhavi is pregnant with Kovalan's child. Because of this incident, Kannagi requests Kovalan to go back for her but Kovalan refuses the request. At last, Kovalan and Kannagi move to the Pandya kingdom while Madhavi leaves for her home.

With time, Madhavi gives birth to her daughter Manimekala. Hearing the story of her father and mother at a young age, Manimekala becomes dissatisfied with her normal life. Due to this reason, she refuses the marriage proposal of the Chola prince. She converted to Buddhism after hearing the sermon of a Buddhist monk in the Chola kingdom. But the Chola prince is always after her. One day, he was killed by Manimekala and she was banished from the kingdom for her act.

Kovalan finds out about Madhavi and her daughter Manimekala, but he repents for his actions and decides not to meet Madhavi and Manimekala again. Kovalan and Kannagi lived for so long without selling the anklets but now they realise that they couldn't resist their life without selling them. Kovalan is determined to sell one anklet and keep one anklet with Kannagi and he leaves for Madurapura (present-day Madurai), the capital of the Pandya dynasty.

Meanwhile, he approaches Madurapura, At the same time, one of the anklets of the Pandya queen has been stolen. The king announces a prize for the person who brings the queen's anklet back. Kovalan had to meet the royal goldsmith (the one who stole the queen's anklet) to sell Kannagi's anklet. The cunning goldsmith rushes to the palace and tells the king that he caught the thief who stole the royal anklet, falsely framing Kovalan.

The king orders his men to capture Kovalan and return the royal anklet. After Kovalan is brought to the palace, the king orders his men to execute him without thinking twice and the due judicial procedures. Meanwhile, Kannagi comes to Madurapura and searches for Kovalan. She learns that Kovalan was executed for falsely stealing the royal anklet. The king and queen are happy to get their anklet. But the anguished Kannagi storms into the palace court and throws the anklet with such force that it breaks open. The anklet is revealed to contain rubies, as opposed to the queen's anklet which contains pearls. The queen faints out of shock. Kannagi curses the king for his actions and curses Madurapura to be burnt to the ground. Due to her utmost pure chastity, A spark of fire appears and kills the king, the queen, and everyone in Madurapura. Madurapura is burnt to the ground as Kannagi ascends to heaven. After this, the people of Sri Lanka and Tamil Nadu revere Kannagi as a goddess and call her Pattini or Kannagi Amman.

== Cast ==
- Pooja Umashankar as Kannagi, also known as Pattini or Kannagi Amman
- Uddika Premarathna as Kovalan
- Aruni Rajapaksha as Madhavi
- Vinu Udani Siriwardhana as Manimekala
- Nita Fernando as Chithrapathi
- Awanthi Aponsu as Devanthi
- Ravindra Randeniya as Pandya King
- Sanath Gunathilake as Soli King
- Ramani Siriwardhana as Queen Consort of Pandya King
- Daya Alwis as Royal goldsmith
- Lucky Dias as King Gajaba
- Wijeratne Warakagoda as Kovalan's father
- Chithra Warakagoda as Kavundi
- Ama Wijesekara as Vasanthimala
- Wasantha Wittachchi as Paththini Hami
- Anura Bandara Rajaguru as Drummer
- Sampath Tennakoon as Athura's father
- Madusha Ramasinghe as Paththini Devi
- Thushari Wehalla as Deepathilaka
- Surangi Koshala as Shalini
- Priya Vithanachchi as Goddess Meenakshi
- Yasas Rathnayake as Prince Udaya
- Miyuri Samarasinghe as Villager

== Soundtrack ==
The soundtrack of the film is composed by Rohana Weerasinghe, with lyrics written by Sunil Ariyarathna and Praneeth Abeysundara.

Paththini

Film score by Rohana Weerasinghe
- Length: 23:16
- Language: Sinhala

No.	Title	Lyrics	Singer(s)	Length
1.	"Paththini Devi"	Praneeth Abeysundara	Nanda Malini	2:33
2.	"Sudo Sudu"	Sunil Ariyaratne	Kasun Kalhara, Uresha Ravihari	4:44
3.	"Ran Hasun Lolwana"	Praneeth Abeysundara	Nirosha Virajini	3:49
4.	"Punchi Samanalee"	Sunil Ariyaratne	Nirosha Virajini	4:42
5.	"Namasthu The"	Sunil Ariyaratne	Damayanthi Jayasooriya, Saman Lenin	2:51
6.	"Sansare"	Sunil Ariyaratne	Amarasiri Peiris	4:37
Total length:				23:16

== Release ==
The film was released on 5 May 2016 in more than 30 EAP circuit cinemas. The film trailer was released one month prior to the release date.
