= Sarungal =

- official poster
- Directed by: Nalaka Vithanage
- Written by: Nalaka Vithanage
- Produced by: Niro Films
- Starring: Charith Abeysinghe; Chamathka Lakmini; Saranga Disasekara
- Cinematography: Manjula Kumarathunga
- Edited by: Thilanka Perera
- Music by: Ranga Dasanayake
- Distributed by: MPI Circuit
- Release date: 14 December 2018
- Country: Sri Lanka
- Language: Sinhala

Sarungal (Kites) (Sinhala: සරුංගල්) is a 2018 Sri Lankan Sinhala drama, romantic film directed by Nalaka Vithanage and co-produced by Tharanga Athuraliya and A. Parister for Niro Films. It stars Charith Abeysinghe and newcomer Chamathka Lakmini in lead roles along with Saranga Disasekara and Soorya Dayaruwan. Music composed by Ranga Dasanayake. It is the 1317th Sri Lankan film in the Sinhala cinema.

The film received mixed reviews from critics.

== Plot ==
A young girl Asanki (Chamathka) spending the night in a nightclub. Amila (Charith) is a young man looking at Asanki. Unbeknownst to Amila, Asanki too, been sighed and sat next to her. Asanki is in the midst of a tough situation about her marital relationship with Bhanuka (Saranga). Amila is also in a similar situation with his wife Duleeka (Shalika). The two shared their sadness. Amila was deeply moved by Asanki's tears. Asanki also understood Amila's heart and consoled him by turning it into his own. The two began a journey without purpose. They reached the Fort Railway Station and boarded a train bound for Badulla. They stayed at a hotel. Then they found a house to stay. They used their credit cards to pay for it.

When money start to be used up, they seek jobs in Kandy. After few days, both found jobs with reasonable salary. However after few days they start a lusty relationship and start to live together. However, with the life tends to be normal and regular, they saw the dissimilarities between them. After many heated verbal conversations, they revealed that both are married, even though they never knew it. Finally it was revealed that Asanki's husband is the owner of the company where Amila's wife worked.

== Cast ==
- Charith Abeysinghe as Milinda
- Chamathka Lakmini as Asanki
- Saranga Disasekara as Bhanuka, Asanki's husband
- Yash Weerasinghe as Heshan
- Shalika Edirisinghe as Duleeka, Milinda's wife
- Janaka Ranasinghe as Home selling man
- Chinthaka Peiris as Manager
- Suneth Malsiripura
- Julia Kaluarachchi as Roshel
- Tashin Maduka as Pickpocket boy
- Soorya Dayaruwan in uncredited role
