= 28 (2014 film) =

- Theatrical release poster
- Directed by: Prasanna Jayakody
- Written by: Prasanna Jayakody
- Produced by: Rashitha Jinasena
- Starring: Mahendra Perera; Semini Iddamalgoda; Rukmal Nirosh
- Cinematography: Chandana Jayasinghe
- Edited by: Aasim Tiger
- Music by: Dheshaka Bamunumulla
- Distributed by: Mountain River Films
- Release dates: 24 January 2014 (International Film Festival Rotterdam); 2 June 2017 (Sri Lanka)
- Country: Sri Lanka
- Language: Sinhala

28 is a 2014 Sri Lankan feature drama film directed and produced by Prasanna Jayakody. The film starred by Mahendra Perera and Semini Iddamalgoda in lead roles along with Rukmal Nirosh, Sarath Kothalawala. 28 revolves how three men transport the body of a woman, who was raped and murdered, in an old van. One of the men will find out that the woman is his estranged wife. The film name is given considering that the average menstrual cycle of a woman is around 28 Days. (Which is also equal for the moon to complete one full orbit around earth).

The film premiered at the International Film Festival Rotterdam on January 24, 2014, and was released officially in Sri Lanka on 2 June 2017 in CEL Theatres. It is the 1279th Sri Lankan film in the Sinhala cinema.

== Plot ==
In a country where sexuality has become a vulgarity, a man sees his wife nude for the first time as she lay dead after she was sexually assaulted on a mortuary table and then struggles emotionally, to at least claim as his own, the merest part of her body.

Lenin is livid that he has been tricked into transporting a dead body but, seeing the dead Suddhi's torso he agrees unconditionally to transport her body back to the village. When the coffin arrives, the villagers already know how Suddhi died through newspaper reports and rumors resulting in Abasiri's humiliation in front of them.

Suddhi addresses the mourners at her own funeral stating that she is now bereft of fear and censure since she is dead and provides telling and powerful testimony on behalf of all women.

== Cast ==
- Mahendra Perera as Abasiri
- Rukmal Nirosh as Mani
- Semini Iddamalgoda as Suddi
- Sarath Kothalawala as Lenin
- Daya Thennakoon as Ukku Banda
- Sisira Kadikara
- Nilmini Kottegoda
- Priyantha Prabath
- Ariyaratne Perera

== Awards ==
The film was screened at the Rotterdam International Film Festival in the Netherlands. It won the NETPAC Jury Award for Best Film. Mahendra Perera and Prasanna Jayakody nominated for two Asia Pacific Screen Awards for Best Performance by an Actor and Best Screenplay respectively.

Award	Category	Recipient(s)	Result
Rotterdam International Film Festival	NETPAC Jury Award	Prasanna Jayakody	Won
Asia Pacific Screen Award	Best Screenplay	Prasanna Jayakody	Nominated
Asia Pacific Screen Award	Best Performance by an actor	Mahendra Perera	Nominated
Derana Film Awards 2018	Best Director	Prasanna Jayakody	Won
Derana Film Awards 2018	Best Film	Prasanna Jayakody	Won
Derana Film Awards 2018	Best Actor	Mahendra Perera	Nominated
Derana Film Awards 2018	Best Script	Prasanna Jayakody	Won
Derana Film Awards 2018	Best Actor in a supporting role	Sarath Kothalawala	Nominated

== Reception ==
28 was met by mostly positive reviews. Jury of the Rotterdam International Film Festival mentioned that “a well-measured and crafted film that emotionally engages the audience through poetic storytelling of a critical subject.”
