= Dasun Pathirana =

Sri Lankan actor

Dasun Pathirana දසුන් පතිරණ
- Born: 26 July 1985 (age 40)
- Education: Carey College, Colombo
- Occupation: Actor
- Years active: 2002–present
- Spouse: Nadeesha Hansi Dissanayake
- Children: 2
- Awards: Best Actor

Dasun Pathirana (born 26 July 1985, as දසුන් පතිරණ) [Sinhala]), is a model and actor in Sri Lankan cinema, theater and television. He won an award at Indie Fest 2014 as best actor in a leading role. He received his first Sarasaviya award in 2018.

== Personal life ==
Pathirana was born on born 26 July 1985 and studied in Carey College, Colombo. He studied drama and acting under Mahendra Perea's academy of acting and drama. He had one younger sister, Deshani who was born in 1996.

Dasun's partner is Nadeesha Hansi Dissanayake and their love story had been a secret to the media for four years. The two has two daughters, Shaiya Lily Pathirana, born in 2018 and Shaya Lily Pathirana, born in 2019

== Career ==
Pathirana started his career in 2002 at the age of 17. In 2004, Pathirana entered Mahendra Perera’s Academy for Acting and Drama.

He performed in many Sri Lankan teledramas, films, commercials, stage dramas and music videos. He received a Best Upcoming Actor award for his role in the teledrama Ahasin Watuna.

In 2014, he was the lead in the film Frangipani, which screened at Tasveer, the ninth Annual Seattle South Asian Film Festival and at the BFI Flare LGBT Film Festival. His acting received positive reviews.

In 2015, he played the lead in Motor Bicycle, which won best film and best direction awards at the SAARC Film Festival. The film also won the "Cinema of tomorrow" award at the Derana Film Award Ceremony in year 2015.

He received the best actor award in Derana sunsilk cinema Awards 2017 for his role "Kasun" in movie Sayapethi Kusuma. He performed in many music videos and won the best actor in a video award in Derana music award ceremony in 2016.

=== Television serials ===
- 4chun Residencies
- Ado as Aravinda
- A/L Iwarai
- Dorakada Devola
- Giridevi
- Mage Adara Awanaduwa
- Massa as Massa
- Mawa Mathakada
- Maya Patala
- Mega
- Meka Thamai Jeevithe
- Parisiyata Paara Kiyana
- Pini Bindu
- Sanda Vinivida
- Sath Piyawaru
- Snan Tv Series as Rajiv's Brother (Cameo Appearance)
- Star Sri Lanka Histhanak
- Take Care
- Thanamalvila Kollek
- Thaththa
- Thriloka
- Thumpane

== Filmography ==
Key
| † | Denotes film or TV productions that have not yet been released |

| Year | Film | Role | Ref. |
|---|---|---|---|
| 2008 | Heart FM | uncredited role | |
| 2010 | How I Wonder What You Are | | |
| 2012 | Ciao (Short film) | | |
| 2015 | Maatha | Lucky | |
| 2016 | Motor Bicycle | Rangana | |
| 2016 | Frangipani | Sarath | |
| 2017 | Nino Live | Nishantha | |
| 2018 | Davena Vihagun | Bus driver | |
| 2018 | Ikka | Film star | |
| 2019 | Husma | Kumara | |
| 2023 | Gajaman | Gajaman (motion) | |
| 2023 | Saho | Tharu | |
| 2023 | Kandak Sema | | |
| 2024 | Seeruwen | | |
| 2024 | Minnu | | |
| 2025 | Maria | Marlon | |
| TBA | Three Diaries † | post production | |
| TBA | Adventures of Ricky Deen † | Angry actor | |
| TBA | Train to Kandy † | | |
| TBA | House of My Fathers † | | |
| TBA | Monkey Man † | | |
| TBA | Ayu † | | |
| TBA | All About My Girl † | | |

== Awards and accolades ==
He has won several awards at the local stage drama, cinema and television festivals.

=== Indie Fest ===
| Year | Nominee / work | Award | Result |
|---|---|---|---|
| 2014 | Performance in Drama | Best Actor | Won |

=== Derana Film Awards ===
| Year | Nominee / work | Award | Result |
|---|---|---|---|
| 2017 | Sayapethi Kusuma | Best Actor | Won |

=== Signis Film Awards ===
| Year | Nominee / work | Award | Result |
|---|---|---|---|
| 2017 | Motor Bicycle | Best Actor | Won |

=== SAARC Film Festival ===
| Year | Nominee / work | Award | Result |
|---|---|---|---|
| 2017 | Motor Bicycle | Best Actor | Won |

=== Sarasaviya Awards ===
| Year | Nominee / work | Award | Result |
|---|---|---|---|
| 2016 | Motor Bicycle | Best Actor | Won |

=== Hiru Golden Film Awards ===
| Year | Nominee / work | Award | Result |
|---|---|---|---|
| 2018 | Motor Bicycle | Best Actor | Won |

=== Raigam Tele'es ===
| Year | Nominee / work | Award | Result |
|---|---|---|---|
| 2013 | Ahasin Watuna | Best Actor | Won |

=== Sumathi Awards ===
| Year | Nominee / work | Award | Result |
|---|---|---|---|
| 2019 | Thaththa | Best Supporting Actor | Won |
