= Prasanna Jayakody =

Sri Lankan film director (born 1968)

Prasanna Jayakody ප්‍රසන්න ජයකොඩි
- Born: Prasanna Jayakody; August 25, 1968 (age 57); Horana, Sri Lanka
- Education: Taxila Central College, Horana
- Occupations: Director, producer, screenwriter
- Years active: 1993–present
- Website: Official

Prasanna Jayakody (Sinhalese: ප්‍රසන්න ජයකොඩි; born August 25, 1968) is a Sri Lankan film director and screenwriter.

== Early life and career ==
Jayakody was educated at Taxila Central College in Horana.

Transitioning to television, Jayakody directed several dramas, including Nisala Vila (The Still Pond, 1999), Imadiyamankada (At the Crossing, 2000), Sanda Amawakayi (The Moon Eclipsed, 2002), and Hada Vila Sakmana (2003). His television drama Awasana Horawa (The Final Hour, 1998) won the Best Young Director Award at the Sumathi Tele Awards.

== Film career ==
His directorial debut, Sankara, was released in 2007 and garnered several awards at both local and international film festivals. It received the Silver Pyramid Award at the Cairo International Film Festival that same year. Additionally, the film also earned accolades for Best Debut Director and the NETPAC Award for Best Asian Film at the Kerala International Film Festival. Sankara also won the Jury Special Prize at the Turkey Silk Road Film Festival.

== Filmography ==
Year	Film	Ref.
2007	Sankara	
2012	Karma	
2014	28	
2015	Leopard Do Not Bite	
2019	Dadayakkaraya	

== Awards and accolades ==
=== Sankara ===
- Cairo International Film Festival – 2006 – Silver Pyramid Award for Best Director
- International Film Festival of Kerala – 2006 – Silver Crow Pheasant
- International Film Festival of Kerala – 2006 – NETPAC Award
- Bursa Festival – 2007 – Special Jury Mention
- Dhaka International Film Festival – 2008 – FIPRESCI Prize

=== 28 ===
- NETPAC Award (Won) at the International Film Festival Rotterdam (IFFR) (2014) Rotterdam, Netherlands
- Special Jury Mention at the Bled Film Festival (2014), Bled, Slovenia
- Award for the Best Director (Won) at the SAARC Film Festival 2018
- Award for the Best Actor (Won) by Mahendra Perera at the SAARC Film Festival 2018
- Asia Pacific Screen Award (Nominated) for Best Screen Play
- Asia Pacific Screen Award (Nominated) Mahendra Perera for Best Performance by an actor
- Award for the Best Film (Won) at the Derana Film Festival 2018
- Award for the Best Director (Won) at the Derana Film Festival 2018 and Hiru Golden Awards 2018
- Award for the Best Screen Play (Won) at the Derana Film Festival 2018
- Award for the Best Actor (Nominated) and Best Actor in a Supportive Role (Nominated) at the Derana Film Festival 2018
- Sarasavi Film Festival 2017 (Won) awards for Best Film, Best Director, Best Script, Best Camera, and Best Editor

=== Karma ===
International Participation:

- Pusan International Film Festival in South Korea
- São Paulo International Film Festival in Brazil
- Rotterdam International Film Festival in the Netherlands
- Chicago International Film Festival in the United States
- Bildrausch International Film Festival in Switzerland
- Marrakech International Film Festival in Morocco
- Isolacinema International Film Festival in Slovenia
