= Thusitha Laknath =

Sri Lankan actor

Thusitha Laknath තුසිත ලක්නාත්
- Born: Thusitha Laknath Galindawattha; 7 September 1983 (age 43); Sri Lanka
- Education: Ananda College
- Occupations: Actor, Dramatist
- Years active: 2000–present
- Awards: Best Actor

Thusitha Laknath Galindawattha (born September 7, 1983), is an actor in Sri Lankan cinema, theater and television. He played Rane in the television serial Deveni Inima.

== Early life ==
Thusitha Laknath was born on 7 September 1983 in Sri Lanka. He completed education from Koswatta Jayawardena Vidyalaya and Ananda College, Colombo.

== Career ==
After finishing school times, he started his theatre education at Tower Hall Theatre Foundation. Thusitha was first involved in stage drama, with Fontamarawa in 2000. He continued with The Doll's House in 2002. From 2002 to 2007, he worked largely behind the scenes as a stage manager, and in 2007, he returned to the stage in Indika Ferdinandoes' production of Swayankreeya Wanshakathawa, followed by roles in Man Diyawela, Sindu Pahai, Security, and Romeo and Juliet. He won national Best Actor credits for three of these roles. He also act in the play Ada Vage Davasaka Antigone directed by Priyankara Rathnayake.

In 2006, he produced the short play Pissanta Mama Aadarai.

Having seen him on stage, film director Vimukthi Jayasundara cast Thusitha in his film Ahasin Watei. This film was screened at many film festivals, including Venice and Toronto. New York theatrical premiere in November 2010. The film Ahasin Watei was shown at the Venice International Film Festival in July 2009, and Thusitha was invited to attend, but was denied an entry visa by the Italian embassy. The only Sri Lankan actor to have been admitted for participation in the Venice Film Festival has been Gamini Fonseka, for the film Nidhanaya.

=== Selected television serials ===
- Bonchi Gedara Indrajala
- Deweni Inima as Rane
- Kaviya Numba
- Koombiyo as Pocket Gune
- Mayarajini
- Sakarma
- Sansararanya Asabada
- Sihina Wasanthayak
- Thaththa
- Vaten Eha
- Yudha Muktha Kalapayaka Sita Ganeema

== Awards and honors ==
Special Award for acting in “Happy Birthday” National Children Drama Festival 2005.

Best Actor for Acting in “Man Diyawela”at the National Drama Festival 2007.

Best Actor for Acting in “Sindu 5 Calls 5” at the National Short Drama Festival 2007.

Best Actor for Acting in“Security”at the National Youth Drama Festival 2007.

Best Script Writer 2nd place For “Le Naya” National Youth Drama Festival(2011)

Best production 3rd place For “le Naya” National Youth Drama Festival(2011)

Best Script Writer 1st place For “Pasmaha belum” National Youth Drama Festival 2011.

Best Script Writer 1st place For “Amathaka wenna kalin” National Youth Drama Festival 2012.

Best Script Writer 2nd place for “Ajaramara” National Youth Drama Festival 2012.

Best set Designer for “Amathaka wenna kalin” National Youth Drama Festival 2012.

Best production 2nd place “Amathaka wenna kalin” National Youth Drama Festival 2012.

Best Actor for Acting “Ajaramara” National Youth Drama Festival 2014.

Best Actor for Acting in “Ajaramara” at the National Short Drama Festival 2014

Best script writer for “Ajaramara” National short Drama Festival(2014)

Best production 2nd place “Ran Menika” National Youth Drama Festival 2014

Best Script Writer 2nd place for “Ran Menika” National Youth Drama Festival 2014.

Best Script Writer 2nd place for “Chatrapani” National Youth Drama Festival 2014.

Best production 2nd place “chatrapani” National Youth Drama Festival 2014.

== Filmography ==
Year	Title	Role(s)	Ref.
2009	Ahasin Watei	Rajitha	
2009	Akasa Kusum		
2017	Sakkarang	Rana	
2017	Nino Live	Viraj	
2017	Swaroopa		
2018	Ginnen Upan Seethala	Piyadasa Ranasinghe	
2019	Gaadi		
2022	Alborada		
2025	Tentigo	Younger Son	
TAB	Dinga		
