= 8th Sri Lankan Television State Awards =

2013 Sri Lankan TV awards ceremony

8th Television State Awards
- Date: January 29, 2013
- Site: Bandaranaike Memorial International Conference Hall, Colombo 07, Sri Lanka
- Produced by: Arts Council of Sri Lanka; State Television Advisory Council

Highlights
- Best Picture: 2011 – Thaksalawa; 2012 – Swayanjatha
- Most awards: 2011 – Sri Lanka Rupavahini Corporation (13); 2012 – Sri Lanka Rupavahini Corporation (22)
- Most nominations: 2011 – Thaksalawa; 2012 – Swayanjatha

The 8th Television State Awards festival (Sinhala: 8 වැනි රූපවාහිනී රාජ්‍ය සම්මාන උලෙළ), was held to honor the television programs of 2011 and 2012 Sinhala television on January 29, 2013, at the Bandaranaike Memorial International Conference Hall, Colombo 07, Sri Lanka. The event was organized by the Department of Cultural Affairs under the guidance of the Ministry of Culture & the Arts. The First lady Shiranthi Rajapaksa was the chief guest.

At the award ceremony, veteran artists Arun Dias Bandaranaike, Piyadasa Ratnasingha and Rukman Tissa Wijemanna were received the Lifetime Achievement Awards. Meanwhile, Volume six of Rupavahini Samiksha was also launched at the event. It was presented to first Lady Shiranthi Rajapaksa by Culture and the Arts Minister T. B. Ekanayake.

== 2011 Awards ==
=== Media Section ===
Category	Program	Recipient
Best Documentary Program	Nadunana Minissu	Namal Prasanna
Best Musical Program	Madhura Yame	Vineetha Karunaratne
Best Discussion Program	Anshaka 360	Shihan Baranage
Best Compere (Sinhala)		Chaminda Gunaratne
Best Compere (Tamil)		K. Nagapoosani
Best Compere (English)		Dushaan Vaas
Best News Reader (Sinhala)		Anushka Ekanayake
Best News Reader (Tamil)		J. Yogaraja
Best News Reader (English)		Maheena Bonzo
Best Innovative Program	Andukara Adarawanthaya	Lakmali Kirindiwela
Best Educational & Cultural Program	Rehe Aththange Viththi	K.C. Saranga
Best Pre-promotional Video	Brave Hearts 12	Janajeewa Wehella
Best Dubbing Program	Malgudi Dawasa	Athula Ransirilal
Best Promotional Video	Thawenna Pera	Doctor Kapila Suriyarachchi
Best Graphic Production	Siyatha Sinhala Avurudu Theme	Dunsten Manjuna
Best Television Reporting	Saddantha Uwadura	Manjula Prabath

=== Television Serial Section ===
Category	Television Serial	Recipient
Best Television Serial	Thaksalawa	Ananda Abenayake
Best Teledrama Direction	Ayal	Chamara Janaraj Peiris
Best Actor	Ayal	Pradeep Dharmadasa
Best Actress	Yasa Isuru	Malkanthi Jayasinghe
Best Supporting Actor	Thaksalawa	Tissa Bandaranayake
Best Supporting Actress	Thaksalawa	Chandani Seneviratne
Best Script	Thaksalawa	Deepani Nilashini Yapa
Best Camera Direction	Thaksalawa	Dhammika Rathnayake
Best Editor	Thaksalawa	Jagath Weeratunga
Best Music Director	Yasa Isuru	Eshani Yashodha Ranganath
Best Costume Designing	Sakviththo	Manoj Laksiri
Best Art Director	Thaksalawa	Bimal Roy
Best Lyricist	Sulanga	Thusitha Niroshan
Best Singer	Yasa Isuru	Saman Lenin; Amila Sandaruwan; Jehan Srikanth
Best Sound Coordination	Sulanga	Sudath Kumara
Best Child Actor	Thaksalawa	Chanaka Dimuth
Special Jury Awards (acting)	Sakviththo	Nadeesha Alahapperuma
Special Jury Awards (acting)	Sulanga	Denuwan Senadhi
Special Jury Awards (acting)	Sulanga	Doctor Prasanna Gunasena
Special Jury Awards (acting)	Kampana	Subagi Kolinya
Best Single-episode Teledrama	Kampana	Ananda Abenayake

=== Tamil Awards Section ===
Category	Television Serial	Recipient
Best Television Tape	Imudu Paravai	Irane Mohammad
Best Graphic Animation		Shan Rathnayake
Best Discussion Program	Thuvanam	S. Thanarajh
Best Musical Program	Shakthi Junior Superstar	Ziya Ur Hasan
Best Documentary Program	Sutri Varam Boomi	Al Irfan

== 2012 Awards ==
=== Media Section ===
Category	Program	Recipient
Best Advertisement	CIC Advertisement	Try Ads
Best Visual Song	Sespiyanuwage Narakesa	Bhanuka Manoratne
Best Documentary Program	Solias Wesathuru Siththara	Namal Prasanna
Best Background Stage	Ranga Bhoomi	Chamila Gamage
Best Pre-promotional Video	Mul Pituwa	Jayasri Ruwanpura
Best Educational & Cultural Program	Dumbara Kalaala	Wasantha Pathmalal perera
Best Magazine Program	Roopavalokanaya	Sunethra Kumari
Best Television Reporting	Miniran Pathalaka Viththi	Manjula Prabath
Best News Reader (Sinhala)		Nishadi Bandaranayake
Best News Reader (English)		Iftia Abdul Cader
Best Compere (English)		Sharon Muskriansi
Best Dubbing Program	Eloise	Praan Wakishta
Best Musical Program	Sanhinda	Udayakumara Thennakoon
Best Graphic Animation	Shoora Goviya	Dinusha Lakshan
Best Discussion Program (Sinhala)	Hirunikage Helidarawwa	Rashmin Ranasinghe
Best Discussion Program (English)	BIZ 1st	Shantha Kulatunga
Merit Awards		Thushari Kumuduni Gamage
Merit Awards		Samitha Prasanna Arachchi
Merit Awards		Sandhya Vithana Wasam

=== Television Serial Section ===
Category	Television Serial	Recipient
Best Television Serial	Swayanjatha	H.D. Premasiri; Chanaka Fernando; Bandu Ekanayake; Bandara Eheliyagoda
Best Teledrama Direction	Swayanjatha	Sudath Rohana
Best Actor	Swayanjatha	Janak Premalal
Best Actress	Swayanjatha	Chathurika Pieris
Best Supporting Actor	Swayanjatha	Prageeth Rathnayake
Best Supporting Actress	Senakeliyay Maya	Prathibha Hettiarachchi
Best Script	Swayanjatha	Sarath Dharmasiri
Best Camera Direction	Swayanjatha	K.A. Dharmasena
Best Editor	Swayanjatha	Chanaka de Silva
Best Music Director	Kada Dora	Deshaka Sampath
Best Costume Designing	Swayanjatha	Nalin Premathilake
Best Lyricist	Swayanjatha	Bandara Eheliyagoda
Best Singer	Ranthailiya Walawwa	Amarasiri Peiris; Sashika Nisansala
Best Art Director	Swayanjatha	Deepthi Mangalasoma
Best Sound Coordination	Swayanjatha	Prasad Weerakoon
Best Child Actor	Swayanjatha	Trishuna Perera
Best Child Actress	Swayanjatha	Shanudrie Priyasad
Special Jury Awards (acting)	Senakeliyay Maya	Palitha Silva
Special Jury Awards (acting)	Sandagiri Pawwa	Himali Siriwardena
Special Jury Awards (acting)	Sandagiri Pawwa	Buddhika Indrajith
Special Jury Awards (acting)	Pinsara Dosthara	Sunil Costa
Best Single-episode Teledrama	Buddha	Ananda Abenayake
Merit Awards (acting)	Swayanjatha	Jagath Chamila
Merit Awards (acting)	Ethkanda Lihiniya	Sundara Bandara
Merit Awards (acting)	Kada Dora	Ryan van Rooyen
Merit Awards (script)	Swayanjatha	Reginald Jayamanne
Short films: Amateur productions (Gold)		Shirley Samarasinghe
Short films: Amateur productions (Silver)		Prabhath Aravinda
Short films: Amateur productions (Bronze)		Mahesh Hewawasam

=== Tamil Awards Section ===
Category	Television Serial	Recipient
Best Compere (Tamil)		R.J.P. Croos
Best Discussion Program	Arokkyam	K. Konesh
Best Musical Program	Peace Song	P. Nithyanandan
Best Magazine Program	Innai Pugal	Hilmy Ahamed
Best Pre-promotional Video	Shakthi Junior Superstar	Ziya Ur Hasan
Best News Reader		Priya Alalasundaram
Best Educational & Cultural Program	Man Wasanei	S. Moses
Best Multi-camera Program	Shakthi Superstar	Ziya Ur Hasan
Best Television Tape	Shakthi Song	K. Dinesh Kumar
Best Documentary Program	Music Cafe	K. Punyamoorthi
Best Graphic Animation	Nallur Kovil	Shan Rathnayake
Best Single-episode Teledrama	Pudumei Penn	S. Moses
Best Literary Book	Sri Lankan TV	M. Pageerathy

== See also ==
- 15th Sri Lankan Television State Awards
- 14th Sri Lankan Television State Awards
- 13th Sri Lankan Television State Awards
- 12th Sri Lankan Television State Awards
- 9th Sri Lankan Television State Awards
- 7th Sri Lankan Television State Awards
- 6th Sri Lankan Television State Awards
