= Raigam Tele'es Best Teledrama =

The Raigam Tele'es Best Teledrama Award is presented annually in Sri Lanka by the Kingdom of Raigam associated with many commercial brands for the best Sri Lankan teledrama of the year in television screen.

The award was first given in 2005. Following is a list of the winners of this prestigious title since then.

== Award list in each year ==
Year	Best Teledrama	Director	Ref.
2004			
2005			
2006	Katu Imbula	Sudath Rohana	
2007			
2008			
2009	Arungal	Lalith Rathnayake	
2010	Thaksalawa	Ananda Abenayake	
2011			
2012			
2013	Appachchi	Ananda Abenayake	
2014	Chess	Ananda Abenayake	
2015	Daskon	Jackson Anthony	
2016	One Way	Lalith Rathnayake	
2017	Badde Kulawamiya	Ananda Abenayake	
2018	Koombiyo	Lakmal Dharmarathne	
2019	Sudu Andagena Kalu Awidin	Sunil Costa	
2020	Thanamalvila Kollek	Roshan Ravindra	
2021	Sakarma	Priyantha Fernando	
2024	Viyali	Dilupa Niroshani de Alwis	
