= 15th Sri Lankan Television State Awards =

2021 Sri Lankan TV awards ceremony

15th Television State Awards
- Date: November 29, 2021
- Site: Bandaranaike Memorial International Conference Hall, Colombo 07, Sri Lanka
- Organized by: Arts Council of Sri Lanka; State Television Advisory Council; Department of Cultural Affairs

Highlights
- Best Picture: Weeraya Gedara Ewith
- Best Director: Ananda Abeynayake
- Best Actor: Roshan Ravindra
- Best Actress: Jayani Senanayake
- Most awards: Sri Lanka Rupavahini Corporation (36)
- Most nominations: Sri Lanka Rupavahini Corporation

The 15th Television State Awards festival (Sinhala: 15 වැනි රූපවාහිනී රාජ්‍ය සම්මාන උලෙළ), was held to honour the television programs of 2020 Sinhala television on November 29, 2021, at the BMICH (Bandaranaike Memorial International Conference Hall), Colombo 07, Sri Lanka. The event was organized by the State Television Advisory Council, Arts Council of Sri Lanka, Department of Cultural Affairs, Ministry of Housing and Cultural Affairs. Kamal Addararachchi and Vidura Wickremanayake were attended as the Chief Guests.

At the award ceremony, K. B. Herath and Mr. M. D. Mahindapala received the Lifetime Achievement Award.

== Awards ==
=== Media Section ===
Category	Program	Recipient
Special Jury Awards	Tour with Rohan Direx	Rohan Direx
Special Jury Awards	Horton Plains	Pujitha Dissanayake
Best Television Tape	Katirayaṭa Pera	Manoj Rathnayake
Best Pre-promotional Video	Kavi Dahayata Gee Dahayak	Thustha Vidanage
Best Animation	Pimbuna Gemba	Sanjaya Gunarathna
Best Children's Program	Punchi Ape Lokaya	Thusitha Vidanapathirana
Cultural Audio Visual Program	Kalabara	R. A. Dushantha
Best Dubbing Program	Maugli	Pran Wakista
Best Magazine Program	Rata	Viraj Dharmadasa
Best Musical Program	Tone Poyam	Ranga Premaratne
Best Documentary Program	Wolf Noki Beddegama	Namal Prasanta
Best Multi-camera Production	Dream Star Stage 8 Finals	Kkrishanthi Rajika
Best Compere (Sinhala)	Sirasa TV	Wasana Lakmali
Best Compere (English)	TV Derana	Mahiesh Johnney
Best News Reader (Sinhala)	TV Derana	Wasanthi Nanayakkara
Best News Reader (English)	Channel Eye	Nathaliya Weerawardhane
Best Exploratory News Reporting	Kumbukkan Oya	Dusani Nanayakkara
Best Debating Program	Talk with Chatura	Suminda Tharaka Jayasekara
Best Sports Program	Story of Champions	Suminda Tharaka Jayasekara
Best Academic/Research Book on Television	Visual Signification and Sociocultural; Deconstruction of Television in Sri Lanka	Bertram Nihal

=== Television Serial Section ===
Category	Television Serial	Recipient
Best Television Serial	Weeraya Gedara Ewith	Ananda Abeynayake; Fahim Mawjood
Best Single-episode Teledrama	Apararambhaya	Santhusa Liyanage
Special Jury Award	Weeraya Gedara Ewith	Nethali Nanayakkara
Merit Award	Sudu Andagena Kalu Awidin	Michelle Dilhara
Best Child Actor	Weeraya Gedara Ewith	Akidhu Menija Bandara
Best Documentary Television Serial	Govirajasiri	Kapila Sooriyaarachchi
Best Dramatic Television Serial	Weeraya Gedara Ewith	Ananda Abeynayake
Best Teledrama Direction	Weeraya Gedara Ewith	Ananda Abeynayake
Best Actor	Weeraya Gedara Ewith	Roshan Ravindra
Best Actress	Weeraya Gedara Ewith	Jayani Senanayake
Best Supporting Actor	Weeraya Gedara Ewith	Kanishka Xavier
Best Supporting Actress	Weeraya Gedara Ewith	Dinupa Kodagoda
Best Script	Weeraya Gedara Ewith	Namal Jayasinghe
Best Art Director	Weeraya Gedara Ewith	Suneth Nandalal
Best Make up	Ravana	Buwaneka Ranawaka
Best Camera Direction	Sudu Andagena Kalu Awidin	S. Paranavitha
Best Editor	Weeraya Gedara Ewith	Jagath Weeratunga
Best Music Director	Doowili Ahasa	Dinesh Dissanayake

== See also ==
- 14th Sri Lankan Television State Awards
- 13th Sri Lankan Television State Awards
- 12th Sri Lankan Television State Awards
- 9th Sri Lankan Television State Awards
- 8th Sri Lankan Television State Awards
- 7th Sri Lankan Television State Awards
- 6th Sri Lankan Television State Awards
