= Sunil Costa =

Sri Lankan Director

Sunil Costa සුනිල් කොස්තා
- Born: Kandawala, Negombo, Sri Lanka
- Education: St. Mary's College
- Occupations: Director, script Writer, actor
- Years active: 1990–present
- Height: 5 ft 10 in (178 cm)
- Spouse: Nilmini Costa
- Children: 3
- Parents: Aloysius Costa (father); H. D. Liliana (mother)
- Awards: Best Director

Sunil Costa (Sinhala:සුනිල් කොස්තා; born 6 April 1959) is a Sri Lankan film director, screenplay writer and a film actor in the Sri Lankan cinema and theater.

In 2012, he won the Best Director, Best Script Writer, Best Production and Jury Awards at the Sumathi Awards, Raigam Tele'es and SIGNIS Awards for his television serials such as Kannadi Koottama, Rodha Hathare Manamaalaya, Sherlock Holmes, Pinsara Dosthara and Piyasa.

In 2019, his teledrama Sudu Andagena Kalu Awidin won the Most Popular Teledrama Award at the 24th Sumathi Awards ceremony. In 2020 Costa was nominated as the Best Director of the year 2019, and his television series Sudu Andagena Kalu Awidin received 14 nominations including the Best Teledrama of the year 2019 at the Raigam Tele'es award ceremony. During the same year, Costa was nominated as the Best Director and Best Script Writer at the Television State Awards 2019, and his television series Sudu Andagena Kalu Awidin received several other nominations as well.

In 2022, Costa was nominated as the Best Director and Best Script Writer at the Raigam Tele'es Awards 2020 for his television series Can You Hear Me? (2020 TV series).

== Personal life ==
Costa was born on 6 April 1959 in Kandawala, Negombo, to Aloysius Costa and H. D. Liliana. Costa completed his primary education at Kandawala St. Joseph's College, and completed his secondary education at St. Mary's College.

He is married to Nilmini Costa. The couple has one daughter; Nethmi and two sons; Isira and Dilru.

== Career ==
In 1990, Costa marked his acting debut in the film Christhu Charithaya, a film based on the life of Jesus Christ until crucifixion. The film was directed by Sunil Ariyaratne and produced by Alerik Lionel Fernando. In 1994, Costa made his directorial debut with the telefilm Arundathi that won the UNDA Award for the Best Cameraman in 1995 at the SIGNIS Awards award ceremony. Since then he continued to write, direct and produce three other telefilms.

In 1995, Costa won the UNDA Merit Award for the Best Direction at the SIGNIS Awards ceremony for his second telefilm Kaakko. His third telefilm Kannadi Kuttama received the UNDA Merit Awards for the Best Director, Best Script Writer, Best make–up Artist and the Best Tele Film of the Year 1996 at the SIGNIS Awards (Sri Lanka) award ceremony. In 1996, Costa directed his fourth telefilm Sellange. He received the Sumathi Best Tele-Film of the Year award at the Sumathi Awards 1997 for the telefilm. He then began directing and script writing the television series Romeo Juliet which aired on Sri Lanka Rupavahini Corporation. The series was an adaptation from William Shakespeare's play “Romeo & Juliet”.

In 2007, Costa directed his next television series Siri Sirimal with 39 episodes that were telecast on Sri Lanka Rupavahini Corporation. The story describes about the life of a boy named Siri Sirimal. The series is said to be an adaptation of the novel The Adventures of Tom Sawyer by Mark Twain. In 2009, the Best Music score Golden Award was awarded to Dinesh Subasinghe at the SIGNIS Awards (Sri Lanka) award ceremony for the television series Siri Sirimal. The television series Sherlock Holmes was directed and written by Costa in 2007. This series was inspired by the novel Sherlock Holmes by Sir.Arthur Conan Doyle. The television series received the Raigam Tele'es Jury Award for the Best Director of the Year 2009 and the Jury Award for the Best Director of the Year 2009 in Sumathi Awards.

In 2011, Costa began working on his television series Pinsara Dosthra which was an adaptation of the novel Strange Case of Dr Jekyll and Mr Hyde written by the Scottish author Robert Louis Stevenson. This was telecasted on the Independent Television Network. Costa received the special Jury Award for Pinsara Dosthra as the Best Director of the year at the Sumathi Awards in 2012. Dinesh Subasinghe also received the Best Music Director Award of the year at the Sumathi Awards during the same year. In 2015, Costa started directing his teledrama Piyasa which was telecasted on Independent Television Network. The teledrama won three awards for the Best Director, Best Script Writer and Best Teledrama of the year 2017 at the SIGNIS Awards (Sri Lanka).

Sudu Andagena Kalu Awidin is the most recent teledrama that was directed and written by Sunil Costa. The teledrama was aired in Sri Lanka Rupavahini Corporation on weekdays from Monday to Thursday. The teledrama depicts the hardships faced by a mother and daughter when finding her father. In 2019, the teledrama won the Most Popular Teledrama Award at the 24th Sumathi Awards ceremony. In 2020 Costa was nominated as the Best Director and Best Script Writer of the year 2019, including another 14 nominees at the Raigam Tele'es award ceremony for the teledrama Sudu Andagena Kalu Awidin. In 2018 film Vijayaba Kollaya Costa portrayed the character of a priest. This film was directed by Sunil Ariyaratne. In 2020, Costa was nominated as the Best Director and Best Script Writer at the Television State Awards for his television series Sudu Andagena Kalu Awidin including several other nominations

In 2020 Costa directed the thriller TV series Can You Hear Me?. It was written by him and produced by Chinthaka Kulathunga. The TV series aired in Sri Lanka Rupavahini Corporation on weekdays from Monday to Thursday.The plot talks about different groups of the society that has been systematically ignored by the majority of the public. The series consists of three seasons. In 2022 Costa was nominated as the Best Director and Best Script Writer of the year 2020, including 4 other nominations at the Raigam Tele'es award ceremony for the television series Can You Hear Me? (2020 TV series). During the same year he was nominated as the Best Director and Best Script Writer of the year 2020 at the SIGNIS Awards award ceremony for the television series Can You Hear Me? (2020 TV series).

== Directed television series ==
Year	Serial	Ref.
1994	Arundathi	
1995	Kaakko	
1996	Kannadi Kuttama	
1996	Sellange	
1997	Romeo Juliet	
2003	Roda Hathare Manamalaya	
2007	Siri Sirimal	
2008	Sherlock Holmes	
2011	Pinsara Dosthra	
2012	Sudui Usi	
2015	Piyasa	
2019	Sudu Andagena Kalu Awidin	
2020	Can You Hear Me?	

== Awards and accolades ==
=== SIGNIS Awards ===
Year	Nominee / work	Award	Result
1995	Kaakko	Best Direction UNDA Merit	Won
1996	Kannadi Kuttama	Best Direction UNDA Merit	Won
1996	Kannadi Kuttama	Best Script UNDA Merit	Won
2003	Roda Hathare Manamalaya	Best Director	Won
2003	Roda Hathare Manamalaya	Best Script	Won
2017	Piyasa	Best Director	Nominated
2017	Piyasa	Best Script	Nominated
2020	Sudu Andagena Kalu Awidin	Best Director	Nominated
2020	Sudu Andagena Kalu Awidin	Best Script	Nominated
2021	Can You Hear Me? (2020 TV series)	Best Director	Nominated
2021	Can You Hear Me? (2020 TV series)	Best Script	Nominated

=== Sumathi Awards ===
Year	Nominee / work	Award	Result
1997	Sellange	Best Teledrama	Won
2009	Sherlock Holmes	Best Director Jury	Won
2012	Pinsara Dosthra	Best Director Special Jury	Won
20	Sudu Andagena Kalu Awidin	Best Director	Nominated
2020	Sudu Andagena Kalu Awidin	Best Script	Nominated
2020	Sudu Andagena Kalu Awidin	Best Teledrama	Nominated

=== Raigam Tele'es ===
Year	Nominee / work	Award	Result
2009	Sherlock Holmes	Best Director Jury	Won
2019	Sudu Andagena Kalu Awidin	Best Director	Nominated
2019	Sudu Andagena Kalu Awidin	Best Script	Nominated
2019	Sudu Andagena Kalu Awidin	Best Teledrama	Won
2021	Can You Hear Me? (2020 TV series)	Best Director	Nominated
2021	Can You Hear Me? (2020 TV series)	Best Script	Nominated
2021	Can You Hear Me? (2020 TV series)	Best Teledrama	Nominated

=== Television State Awards ===
Year	Nominee / work	Award	Result
2012	Pinsara Dosthra	Best Direction Special Jury	Won
2019	Sudu Andagena Kalu Awidin	Best Director	Nominated
2020	Sudu Andagena Kalu Awidin	Best Script	Nominated
2020	Sudu Andagena Kalu Awidin	Best Teledrama	Nominated
