= 12th Sri Lankan Television State Awards =

2015 Sri Lankan TV awards ceremony

12th Television State Awards
- Date: December 28, 2015
- Site: Nelum Pokuna Mahinda Rajapaksa Theatre, Colombo 07, Sri Lanka
- Organized by: Arts Council of Sri Lanka; State Television Advisory Council; Department of Cultural Affairs

Highlights
- Best Film: Girikula
- Best Director: Sudath Rohana
- Best Actor: Vishwajith Gunasekara
- Best Actress: Kanchana Mendis
- Most awards: Independent Television Network

The 12th Television State Awards festival (Sinhala: 12 වැනි රූපවාහිනී රාජ්‍ය සම්මාන උලෙළ), was held to honor the television programs of 2014 Sinhala television on December 28, 2015, at the Nelum Pokuna Mahinda Rajapaksa Theatre, Colombo 07, Sri Lanka. The event was organized by the Ministry of Culture and the Arts, State Television Advisory Council and Arts Council of Sri Lanka. His Excellency The President of Sri Lanka Maithripala Sirisena was the chief guest. A total of were received for the Best Sinhala and Tamil Artists in 35 categories.

At the award ceremony, veteran broadcaster Shan Wickremesinghe received the Lifetime Achievement Award. Meanwhile, the 9th issue of the Rupavahini Survey Book for the Rupavahini State Awards was also launched.

== Awards ==
=== Media Section ===
Category	Program	Recipient
Best Graphic Production	Goni Race	Sirila Rathnayake; Oshadha Madhumal
Best Television Tape	Siyathu Seeya	Athula Ransirilal
Best Pre-promotional Video	Sirasa Lakshyapathi	Samith Basnayake
Best Background Stage	Derana Little Star Season 6	Kasun Madhava Gunathilake
Best Multi-camera Production	Derana Dream Star Season 5	Sarath Seneviratne
Best Musical Program	Dell Studio	Chinthana Dilanga Gamlath; Subodani Karunanayake
Best Television Reporting	Attention: Malayasiyawe Atharaman Wuwo	Vasanthi Nanayakkara
Best Documentary Program	Bisowarunge Janapadaya	Namal Prasanna
Best Children's Program	Kada Walalu	Athula Ransirilal
Best Book on Television Media		Stanley Seneviratne
Best Compere (Sinhala)		Sithuvili Sithara
Best Compere (Tamil)		Suhail Ismail
Best News Reader (Sinhala)		Nishadi Bandaranayake
Best Debate Program	Weekend Dialog on Biz Round Up	Indeewari Amuwatte
Best Religious Program	Soma Nuwara Maha Dageba	Sandaruwan Thilakaratne
Best Magazine Program	Ayubowewa	Sandhya Vithanawasam
Best Educational & Cultural Program	Puravidya Rasawatha	Namal Prasanna
Short films: Amateur productions (Gold)	Beneath Two Ends	Ajantha Weerawardhana
Short films: Amateur productions (Silver)	Dalambuwekuge Awasan Rathriya	Nuwanthika Gamage
Short films: Amateur productions (Bronze)	Herda Sakshiya	Duleeka Lokubalasuriya
Best Visual Song	Aliyata Lipiyak	Devika Tharangani; Vinoja Kiriwandeniya
Best Dubbing Program	Life of Pie	Kanchana Amararatne
Special Jury Award	Thawath Amma Kenek	Sisira Deepthi (camera)

=== Television Serial Section ===
Category	Television Serial	Recipient
Best Television Serial	Girikula	Fahim Mavujud
Best Teledrama Direction	Girikula	Sudath Rohana
Best Actor	Chess	Vishwajith Gunasekara
Best Actress	Girikula	Kanchana Mendis
Best Supporting Actor	Girikula	Nilmini Tennakoon
Best Supporting Actress	Girikula	Niroshan Wijesinghe
Best Music Director	Bandara Deyyo	Samantha Perera
Best Lyricist	Handapanagala	Rathna Sri Wijesinghe
Best Music Composer	Handapanagala	Gayan Ghanakadhara
Best Singer	Ranaa	Dumal Warnakulasooriya; Uresha Ravihari
Best Script	Chess	Aruna Premachandra
Best Art Director	Girikula	Krishantha Rathnasiri
Best Cinematographer	Purakalani	Nishantha Pradeep
Best Editor	Udu Sulanga	Viranga Ketipearachchi
Best Docudrama	Theveni Aesa 1	Damith Fernando
Best Single-episode Teledrama	Awarna	Lalith Rathnayake
Best Costume Designing	Udu Sulanga	Buwaneka Ranawaka
Best Sound Coordination	Udu Sulanga	Indika Pushpakumara
Merit Awards (acting)	Waramali	Nesta Maneth
Merit Awards (acting)	Wasuli Kanda	Mahendra Weeraratne
Merit Awards (acting)	Ranaa	Asha Edirisinghe
Merit Awards (camera)	Ranaa	Bryan Gamage
Creative Script	Sakshiya	Rasika Suraweerarachchi
Creative Lighting	Sikurada Hawasa Enna	Nandasena Rajapakse
Creative Editor	Sikurada Hawasa Enna	Dimuthu Kuruppu
Creative Cinematographer	Sikurada Hawasa Enna	Asoka Jayasekara
Creative Director	Sikurada Hawasa Enna	Santhusa Liyanage

== See also ==
- 15th Sri Lankan Television State Awards
- 14th Sri Lankan Television State Awards
- 13th Sri Lankan Television State Awards
- 9th Sri Lankan Television State Awards
- 8th Sri Lankan Television State Awards
- 7th Sri Lankan Television State Awards
- 6th Sri Lankan Television State Awards
