= Raigam Tele'es Best Teledrama Actor Award =

The Raigam Tele'es Best Teledrama Actor Award is presented annually in Sri Lanka by the Kingdom of Raigam associated with many commercial brands for the best Sri Lankan actor of the year in television screen.

The award was first given in 2005. Following is a list of the winners of this prestigious title since then.

== Award list in each year ==
Year	Best Actor	Teledrama
2004	Dananjaya Siriwardana	Me Paren Enna
2005	Suminda Sirisena	Punchirala
2006	Janak Premalal	Katu Imbula
2007	Vishwajith Gunasekara	Rala Bindena Thena
2008	Janak Premalal	Karuwala Gedara
2009	Jayalath Manoratne	Arungal
2010	Roshan Ravindra	Abarthu Atha
2011	Bimal Jayakody	Sanakeliyay maya
2012	Sriyantha Mendis	Dhawala Kadulla
2013	Jackson Anthony	Appachchi
2014	Vishwajith Gunasekara	Chess
2015	Roshan Ravindra	Daskon
2016	Pubudu Chathuranga	One Way
2017	Mahendra Perera	Badde Kulawamiya
2018	Roshan Ravindra	Sahodaraya
2019	Ananda Kumara Unnahe	Sudu Andagena Kalu Awidin
2020	Bimal Jayakody	Sulanga Maha Meraka
2021	Thusitha Laknath	Sakarma
2022	Jagath Chamila	Manikkawatha
2023	Mahendra Perera	Eya den Bedala
2024	Priyantha Sirikumara	Backside
