= 6th Sri Lankan Television State Awards =

2009 Sri Lankan TV awards ceremony

6th Television State Awards
- Date: September 14, 2009
- Site: Maharagama Youth Theater, Sri Lanka
- Organised by: Arts Council of Sri Lanka; State Television Advisory Council; Department of Cultural Affairs

Highlights
- Best Actor: Sriyantha Mendis
- Best Actress: Nilmini Tennakoon
- Most awards: Sri Lanka Rupavahini Corporation
- Most nominations: Sri Lanka Rupavahini Corporation

The 6th Television State Awards festival (Sinhala: 6 වැනි රූපවාහිනී රාජ්‍ය සම්මාන උලෙළ), was held to honor the television programs of 2008 Sinhala television on September 14, 2009, at the Maharagama Youth Theater, Sri Lanka. The event was organized by the State Television Advisory Council, Arts Council of Sri Lanka, Department of Cultural Affairs, Ministry of Housing and Cultural Affairs. Prime Minister D. M. Jayaratne was attended as the Chief Guest.

The awards were presented to the best programs in various programs aired on 13 state and private television channels. At the award ceremony, prominent screenwriter Somaweera Senanayake received the Lifetime Achievement Award. Meanwhile, Thilak Jayaratne received the award for the best literary work written on television.

== Awards ==
=== Media Section ===
Category	Program	Recipient
Best Educational & Cultural Program	Hela Bodu Punarudaya	TV Derana
Best Musical Program	Wasath Gee Siri	Jathika Rupavahini
Best Multi-camera Production	Derana Little Star	TV Derana
Best Performance Stage Design	Derana Little Star	TV Derana
Best News Reporting Program	Kal Ikuth Wu Vaidya Upakarana	Thusitha Pitigala
Best Animation Production	Ruwaththi	Dinusha Lakshan
Best Pre-promotional Video	Thaala 1	Jathika Rupavahini
Best Television Tape	Jala Sampatha Surakimu	Young Asia Television
Best Advertisement	Api Wenuwen Api	Anuruddha Jayasinghe
Best News Reader (Sinhala)		Wasantha Pradeepa Masinhage
Best News Reader (Tamil)		Ranjani Rajmohan
Best News Reader (English)		Maheena Bonzo
Best Compere (Sinhala)		Chaminda Gunaratne
Best Compere (English)		Ranjani Rajmohan

=== Television Serial Section ===
Category	Television Serial	Recipient
Best Television Serial	Hendewa	Shirley P. Delankawala
Best Single-episode Teledrama	Jayamangalam	Susiran de Silva
Best Actor	Sathara Denek Senpathiyo	Sriyantha Mendis
Best Actress	Hendewa	Nilmini Tennakoon
Best Supporting Actor	Sadgunakaraya	Lakshman Mendis
Best Supporting Actress	Sadgunakaraya	Chandani Seneviratne
Best Documentary Television Serial	Atapattama	Hasantha Hettiarachchi
Best Music Director	Sathara Denek Senpathiyo	Premasiri Khemadasa
Best Lyricist	Man Hinda	Gaya Ramya Alwis
Best Singer	Ahasa Nil Saluwa Oba	Sashika Nisansala
Best Script	Kampitha Vila	Thilak Jayaratne
Best Art Director	Karuwala Gedara	Eheliyagoda Somathilaka
Best Costume Designing	Mahathala Hatana	Narada Dhananji
Best Editor	Karuwala Gedara	Chanaka de Silva
Best Camera Direction	Sathara Denek Senpathiyo	Ruwan Costa
Special Jury Awards	Hendewa (acting)	Iresha Jayasinghe
Special Jury Awards	Sathara Denek Senpathiyo (direction)	Jayantha Chandrasiri
Special Jury Awards	Kampitha Vila (direction)	Dharmasena Pathiraja
Merit Awards	Hendewa	Hansamala Janaki
Merit Awards	Sathara Denek Senpathiyo	Buddhika Jayaratne
Merit Awards	Mahathala Hatana	Berty Nihal Susiripala
Merit Awards	Mahathala Hatana	Athula Liyanage
Merit Awards	Samanalunta Vedi Thiyanna	Dasun Madushanka
Amateur productions (Gold)		Thisara Thulwan
Amateur productions (Silver)		Chathurika Nimalachandra
Amateur productions (Bronze)		Sandhya Chandrasinghe

== See also ==
- 15th Sri Lankan Television State Awards
- 14th Sri Lankan Television State Awards
- 13th Sri Lankan Television State Awards
- 12th Sri Lankan Television State Awards
- 9th Sri Lankan Television State Awards
- 8th Sri Lankan Television State Awards
- 7th Sri Lankan Television State Awards
