= Akash Sunethkumara =

Sri Lankan filmmaker

- Born: Akash Sunethkumara; 19 January 1994 (age 32); Colombo, Sri Lanka
- Occupation: Filmmaker
- Years active: 2015-present
- Website: https://www.maktub.studio

Akash Sunethkumara (Akash Sk) is a Sri Lankan filmmaker, writer and actor.

== Early life ==
Akash Sunethkumara was born in Colombo, Sri Lanka. He is an alumnus of St. Nicholas' International College Negombo and Staffordshire University.

== Career ==
=== High School Junkies ===
In 2016, Sunethkumara formed a filmmaking collective with a group of friends titled High School Junkies. Together, he created his first publicly released short film EIDETIC which was his Masters thesis project. A low-budgeted short of $300, EIDETIC screened at various film festivals including San Diego Comic-Con's Independent Film Festival. In 2018, he directed a short horror titled The Summoning. Later in 2019, he released a mini-follow up to The Summoning titled The Friend which was also published on Crypt TV. Sunethkumara directed The Knight Out in 2020, a project marketed as an "action musical" which merged the concepts of a music video with martial arts action.

In 2022, Sunethkumara helmed Temporal, a time-travel sci-fi short film about a physicist who races against time to prevent the death of his girlfriend. The film required eight months of work to complete and was experimental to determine how well they could "localize a western sci-fi concept". It was the first project that Sunethkumara and the team had done in collaboration with an external party and also the first project where they collaborated with veteran Sri Lankan actor Lakshman Mendis. Sumner Forbes of Film Threat stated "I was mightily impressed by the production value that Sunethkumara brings to bear in this 30-minute film. The director never loses sight of the film’s strengths, which are the entertaining temporal contradictions that come from leaping back into the recent past, recalling Shane Carruth’s Primer." Sunethkumara collaborated in 2023 with Sri Lankan actress Yureni Noshika on Teddy, a short film that tackled the "constant realities for so many in relationships and marriages not just in Sri Lanka but across the globe".

=== Junkyard Theory ===
Sunethkumara started a podcast during the COVID-19 pandemic called Junkyard Theory where he hosts filmmakers from Hollywood on a livestream. The first education platform of its kind in Sri Lanka, it also offers short modular film courses. Sunethkumara has hosted prominent names in the industry such as Louis Leterrier, Mike Knobloch, John Toll, Paul Hirsch, Donald Sylvester, Richard Norton, Joel Crawford and Simon Barry.

=== Maktüb Studios ===
In 2024, Sunethkumara started a new studio with his fiancée, titled Maktüb Studios. The new venture aims to create feature films, moving away from the shorts he created with High School Junkies.

== Filmography ==
=== Short Films ===
Year	Title	Notes
2016	EIDETIC	First Sri Lankan short film accepted in San Diego Comic-Con's Independent Film Festival
2018	The Summoning	
2019	The Friend	Published on Crypt TV
2020	The Knight Out	
2022	Temporal	
2023	Teddy	
2025	Hooves	Final short film and third short at San Diego Comic-Con's Independent Film Festival

=== Feature Films ===
Year	Title	Notes
2027	Snowbirds	Upcoming debut feature
