= The Summoning (film) =

- Official Poster
- Directed by: Akash Sunethkumara
- Produced by: Akash Sunethkumara; Stefania Perera; Kasun Rathnasiri
- Starring: Shenic Tissera; Stefania Perera; Akash Sunethkumara; Kasun Rathnasiri; Anisha Barakathulla
- Cinematography: Kasun Rathnasiri
- Music by: Ruud Hermans
- Production company: High School Junkies
- Release date: 26 October 2018
- Running time: 14 minutes
- Language: English

The Summoning is a Sri Lankan horror short film written and directed by Akash Sunethkumara. It premiered on the 26 October 2018 and was released on YouTube and Vimeo the same Halloween.

== Premise ==
Four friends discover an ancient spirit board and conduct a séance, inadvertently summoning something sinister that seeks its own vengeance.

== Production ==
The film was conceived as a quick skit for Halloween by the production team High School Junkies after their previous short EIDETIC was received successfully at film festivals around the world including Raindance Film Festival and the San Diego Comic-Con Independent Film Festival. Shot over four nights in Negombo, Sri Lanka this was the group's fifth attempt at a cinematic production, the film's entire completion time lasted roughly 9 months.

== Release ==
The film premiered at the National Film Corporation of Sri Lanka on the 26 October 2018.

=== Reception ===
The Sunday Times praised the 14 minute short's cinematic quality as "hauntingly brilliant" having been made on a shoestring budget.

Dimithri Wijesinghe of The Morning wrote that the director and his crew are able to create an idyllic horror atmosphere with some highly impressive framing, to keep you on edge.

The film also became the second Sri Lankan film to be accepted for screening at San Diego Comic-Con's Independent Film Festival in 2019. Harith Wirasinha of Pulse.lk states that when San Diego Comic-Con chooses two Sri Lankan short films to be featured in their film festival "we know that something is up".
