= 9th Sri Lankan Television State Awards =

2013 media and television awards

9th Television State Awards
- Date: January 12, 2014
- Site: Bandaranaike Memorial International Conference Hall, Colombo 07, Sri Lanka
- Produced by: Arts Council of Sri Lanka; State Television Advisory Council

Highlights
- Best Picture: Yakada Pahanthira
- Best Director: Anuruddha Jayasinghe
- Best Actor: Sriyantha Mendis
- Best Actress: Menaka Pieris
- Most awards: Hiru TV
- Most nominations: Hiru TV

The 9th Television State Awards festival (Sinhala: 9 වැනි රූපවාහිනී රාජ්‍ය සම්මාන උලෙළ), was held to honor the television programs of 2013 Sinhala television on January 12, 2014, at the Bandaranaike Memorial International Conference Hall, Colombo 07, Sri Lanka. The event was organized by the Ministry of Culture and the Arts, State Television Advisory Council and Arts Council of Sri Lanka. The Honorable Speaker of Sri Lanka Chamal Rajapaksa was the chief guest.

At the award ceremony, veteran actor Berty Gunathilake, veteran media personalities Noelin Honter and Kamalini Selvarajan were received the Lifetime Achievement Awards. In addition, 11 awards were presented to the artists under the Pioneer Awards and awards were presented to all its artists on the occasion of the third anniversary of the telecast of Sri Lanka's first teledrama "Dimuthu Muthu". Dudley Rajapaksa, Staff Assistant, Department of Cultural Affairs, Founder of Rupavahini State Awards Ceremony was received a special tribute.

== Awards ==
=== Media Section ===
Category	Program	Recipient
Best Visual Song	Amma	Saman Piyantha Wijetunga
Best Television Reporting	Kurunegala Bus Kappama	Chaminda Karunaratne
Best Dubbing Program	Ice Age	Thusitha S. Karavita
Best Pre-promotional Video	Lakshyapathi 7788	Samith Basnayake
Best Stage Design	The Debator	Samith Basnayake
Best Discussion Program	The Interview with Bishop Duleep de Chikera	Hilmi Ahamed
Best Sports Program	Dinana Lamai	Kavindu Fernando
Best Documentary Program	Sira Nowu Sira Gedara	Vikum Basnayake
Best Magazine Program	Sanwardhana Satahan	Hilmi Ahamed; Shihan Ahamed
Best Educational and Cultural Program	Accident Ward	Sajith Ranasinghe
Best Graphic Production	Dharana	Thiranjaya Dilhan
Best Multi-camera Production	Sirasa Superstar season 5	Sumith Prasannalal
Best News Reader (Sinhala)		Wasantha Pradeep Masinghe
Best News Reader (English)		Sonali Wanigabaduge
Best Compere (Tamil)	Dharana	Sandamali Hewanayake
Merit Awards (acting)	Sarisara Underwater Camaeraman	Menaka Gunawardena
Merit Awards (acting)	Akuru Tharaha Na script	Nihal Bandara
Merit Awards (acting)	Alakamandawa: Helaye Maha Gandharwayano	Vineetha Karunaratne

=== Television Serial Section ===
Category	Television Serial	Recipient
Best Television Serial	Yakada Pahanthira	Bhathisha de Silva; Jayalath Silva
Best Teledrama Direction	Yakada Pahanthira	Anuruddha Jayasinghe
Best Camera Direction	Yakada Pahanthira	Chinthana Somakeerthi
Best Script	Ahasin Watuna	Namal Jayasinghe
Best Costume Designing	Monarathenna	Narada Thotagamuwa
Best Art Director	Parana Tawuma	Kumara Karawudeniya
Best Sound Coordination	Yakada Pahanthira	Ranjith Rubasighe
Best Editor	Yakada Pahanthira	Tissa Surendra
Best Music Director	Yakada Pahanthira	Ruwan Walpola
Best Song Composing	Monarathenna	Ranjith Premaweera
Best Lyricist	Monarathenna	Ranjith Premaweera
Best Singer	Monarathenna	Amarasiri Peiris
Best Singer	Monarathenna	Sashika Nisansala
Best Actor	Dhawala Kadulla	Sriyantha Mendis
Best Actress	Monarathenna	Menaka Pieris
Best Supporting Actor	Monarathenna	Suminda Sirisena
Best Supporting Actress	Yakada Pahanthira	Sulochana Weerasinghe
Merit Awards (acting)	Ahasin Watuna	Senuri Wakishta
Merit Awards (acting)	Ahasin Watuna	Sajana Wanigasuriya
Merit Awards (acting)	Yakada Pahanthira	Chaya Jayasinghe
Merit Awards (direction)		Santhusa Liyanage
Short films: Amateur productions (Gold)	AadiSon	Wasantha Veeraddana
Short films: Amateur productions (Silver)	I'm Rahman	Runan Kannan
Short films: Amateur productions (Bronze)	Sithroo	Tissa Bandara Galegoda

== See also ==
- 15th Sri Lankan Television State Awards
- 14th Sri Lankan Television State Awards
- 13th Sri Lankan Television State Awards
- 12th Sri Lankan Television State Awards
- 8th Sri Lankan Television State Awards
- 7th Sri Lankan Television State Awards
- 6th Sri Lankan Television State Awards
