= Foreign policy of the S. W. R. D. Bandaranaike government =

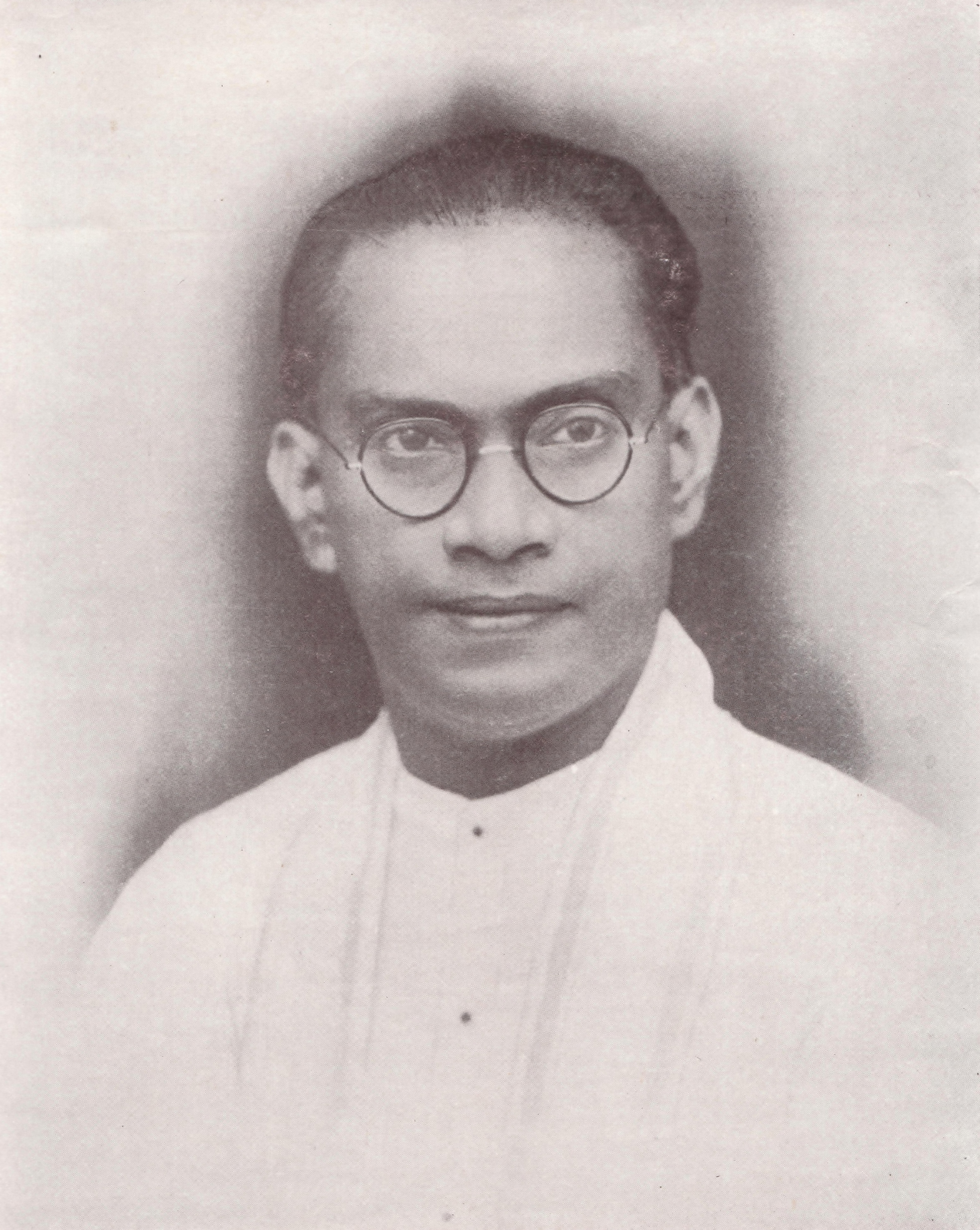
Prime minister SWRD Bandaranaike

S.W.R.D. Bandaranaike's foreign policy emphasized the idea of non-alignment however he had strong ties with socialist and communist nations as well as with Arab nations and India. He shifted the foreign policy of Sri Lanka from being pro-western under the previous right wing United National Party governments to non-alignment under his left wing Sri Lanka Freedom Party government. A remarkable accomplishment of his foreign policy was removing British naval and air bases from Sri Lanka.

== Suez Crisis and Arab nations ==
When the Suez Crisis occurred Bandaranaike stood by Egypt and supported its right to nationalize the Suez Canal Company going against Israel and the UK in the UN. In his address to the United Nations Assembly, Bandaranaike defended Egyptian president Gamal Abdel Nasser by saying Suez Canal rightfully belonged to Egypt. His effort to resolve the Suez Crisis, pleased the Arab Countries. Thus Sri Lanka was appointed as a member of the Suez Advisory Board. Sri Lankan ties with Arab nations grew even stronger under the administration of his wife Sirimavo Bandaranaike when Sri Lanka closed down the Israel embassy in support of the Palestine Liberation Organization (PLO). Sri Lanka was among the first countries to recognize the state of Palestine when it was declared as a state in 1988.

== People's Republic of China ==
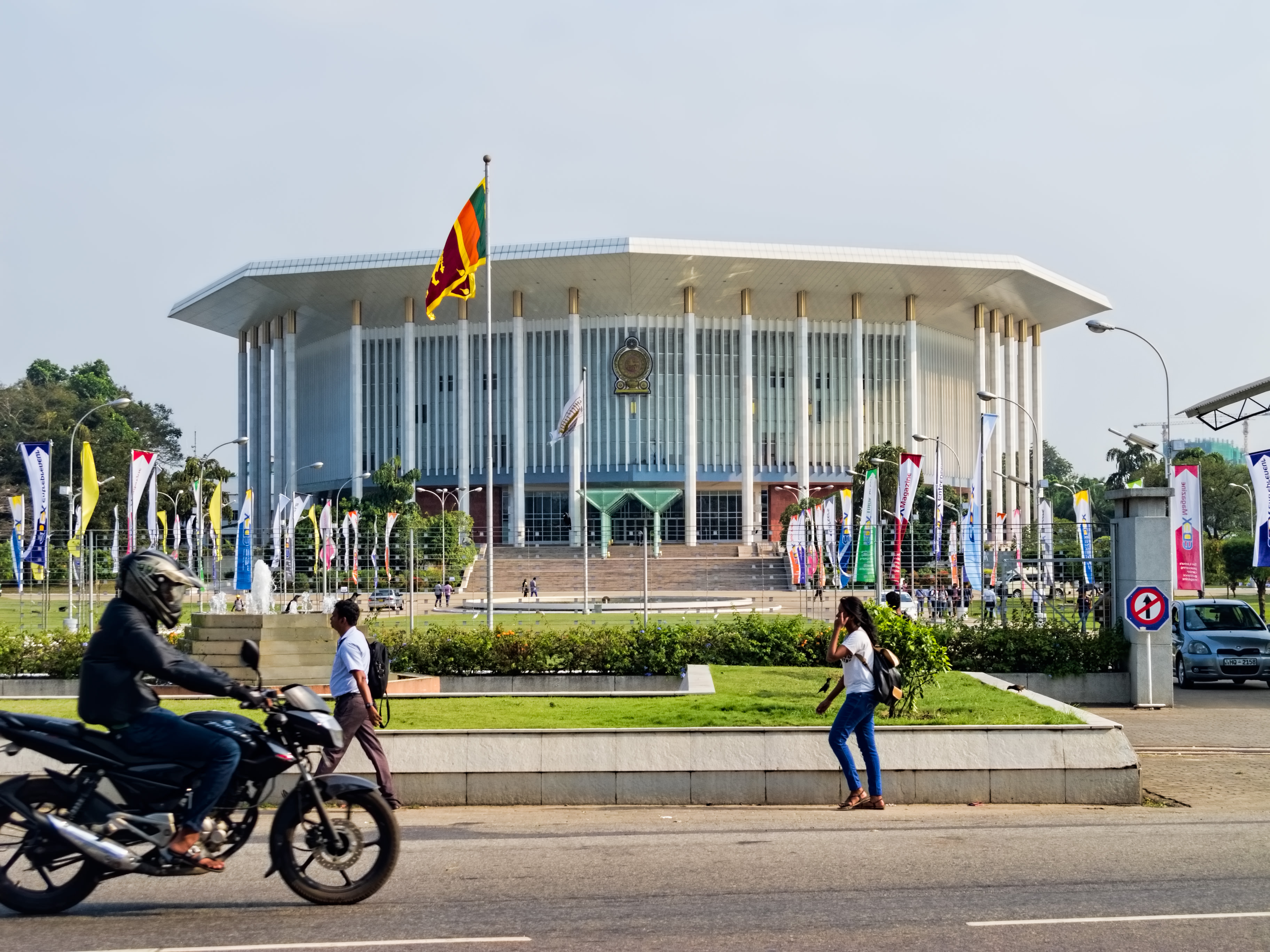
Bandaranaike Memorial International Conference Hall in Colombo gifted by China to Sri Lanka

Chinese premier Zhou Enlai was invited to participate at the ninth celebrations of Sri Lanka’s Independence on February 4, 1957 by prime minister Bandaranaike.The visit paved the way for the establishment of diplomatic relations with the People’s Republic of China. On February 7, 1957, China and Sri Lanka established diplomatic relations. China gifted the Bandaranaike Memorial International Conference Hall to Sri Lanka in memory of prime minister SWRD Bandaranaike. The People’s Republic of China donated LKR 35 million towards the construction of BMICH. China gave 5 Shanghai Class Fast Gun Boats to Sri Lanka which were named "Sooraya" "Weeraya" "Ranakamee" "Dakshaya" and "Balawatha" to represent the initials of S.W.R.D Bandaranaike.

== India ==
Unlike the previous United National Party regimes Bandaranaike maintained a fruitful relationship with India. Indian Prime Minister Nehru called Bandaranaike the Silver tongued orator of Asia.

== Soviet Union ==
Sri Lanka and the Soviet Union established diplomatic relations in 1956 under the leadership of Bandaranaike. Soviet Union granted 120 million LKR as economic aid and provided technical assistance for the Colombo Plan.

== British ==
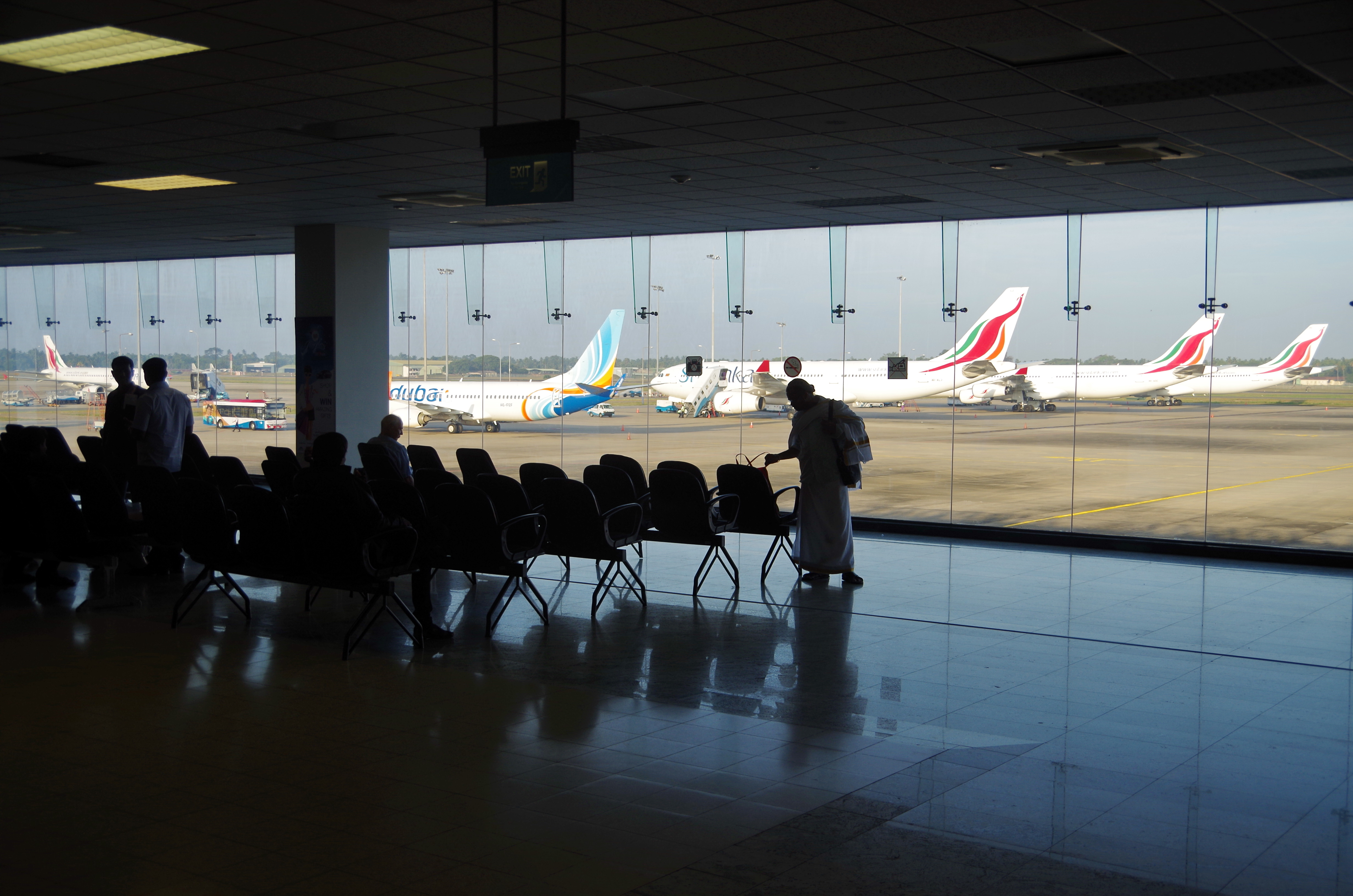
Bandaranaike International Airport

Even after Sri Lanka gained independence in 1948, the British kept Trincomalee Harbor as a naval base and the Katunayake Airport as a airbase. The bases were strategically important because of their location in the Indian Ocean. On October 15, 1957, the Trincomalee naval base was taken over by the Sri Lankan government from the British Navy in a ceremony attended by Prime Minister S. W. R. D. Bandaranaike marking a significant milestone in the path to gaining complete independence. On November 1, 1957 the British airbase in Katunayake which was then known as the Royal Air Force Base Negombo was taken over by the Sri Lankan Government. The airbase was renamed Katunayake airbase. In 1970, Katunayake was named Bandaranaike International Airport (BIA) to commemorate Prime Minister S.W.R.D. Bandaranaike. Bandaranaike International Airport today is the main airport serving Sri Lanka.
