= Eidetic (disambiguation) =

Eidetic is the former name of Bend Studio, an American video game developer. It may also refer to the following:

- Eidetic memory
- Eidetic reduction
- Eidetic (film), 2016 Sri Lankan short film
