= Sumathi Best Teledrama Supporting Actor Award =

The Sumathi Best Teledrama Supporting Actor Award is presented annually in Sri Lanka by the Sumathi Group of Campany associated with many commercial brands for the best Sri Lankan supporting actor of the year in television screen.

The award was first given in 1995. Following is a list of the winners of this prestigious title since then.

== Award list ==
Year	Best Supporting Actor	Teledrama	Ref.
1995	Kamal Addararachchi	Dandubasnamanaya	
1996	W. Jayasiri	Niranandaya	
1997	Suminda Sirisena	Ransirige Sangramaya	
1998	Mahendra Perera	Diya Keta Pahana	
1999	Hemasiri Liyanage	Nisala Wila	
2000	Hemasiri Liyanage	Imadiya Mankada	
2001	Amiththa Weerasinghe	Sohoyuro	
2002	H.A Perera	Nethra Mangallaya	
2003	Suminda Sirisena	Hada Wila Sakmana	
2004	Srinath Maddumage	Depath Nai	
2005	Nihal Fernando	Theth Saha Viyali	
2006	Palitha Silva	Katu Imbula	
2007	Wishwajith Gunasekara	Rala Bindena Thana	
2008	Prasannajith Abeysooriya	Handewa	
2009	Richard Manamudali	Ridee Ittankaraya	
2010	Tissa Bandaranayake	Thaksalawa	
2011	Athula Pathirana	Swayanjatha	
2012	Namal Jayasinghe	Me Wasantha Kalayay	
2013	Jagath Manuwarna	Boralu Para	
2014	Mahendra Perera	Chess	
2015	Mayura Kanchana	Rathu Ahasa	
2016	Lakshman Mendis	Maddahana	
2017	Jagath Chamila	Eka Gei Minissu	
2018	Dasun Pathirana	Thaththa	
2019	Kalana Gunasekara	Ado	
2020	Roger Seneviratne	Ahanna Kenek Na	
2021	Poojana Dandeniya	Sakarma	
2022	Randika Gunathilake	Thumpane	
2023	Randika Gunathilake	Kodi Gaha Yata	
