= 7th Sri Lankan Television State Awards =

2010 Sri Lankan TV awards ceremony

7th Television State Awards
- Date: January 20, 2010
- Site: Bandaranaike Memorial International Conference Hall, Colombo 07, Sri Lanka
- Organized by: Arts Council of Sri Lanka; State Television Advisory Council; Department of Cultural Affairs

Highlights
- Best Picture: Arungal
- Best Director: Lalith Rathnayake
- Best Actor: Jayalath Manoratne
- Best Actress: Jayani Senanayake
- Most awards: Independent Television Network
- Most nominations: Independent Television Network

The 7th Television State Awards festival (Sinhala: 7 වැනි රූපවාහිනී රාජ්‍ය සම්මාන උලෙළ), was held to honour the television programs of 2009 Sinhala television on January 20, 2010, at the Bandaranaike Memorial International Conference Hall, Colombo 07, Sri Lanka. The event was organized by the Ministry of Culture and the Arts, State Television Advisory Council and Arts Council of Sri Lanka. The Prime Minister of Sri Lanka D. M. Jayaratne was the chief guest.

At the award ceremony, veteran actress Iranganie Serasinghe received the Lifetime Achievement Award.

== Awards ==
=== Media Section ===
Category	Program	Recipient
Best Visual Song	Sahan Siluwa	Thilan Cooray
Best News Reader (Sinhala)		Chaminda Gunaratne
Best News Reader (Tamil)		Jeffrey Jeberdarasan
Best News Reader (English)		Maheena Bonzo
Best Pre-promotional Video	Okadin Patan Gena	Sisira Wijesinghe
Best Graphic Production	27th Rupavahini Commemoration	Hasitha Priyankara Herath
Best Television Reporting	Rudhira Paraviyalanaya	Thusitha Pitigala
Special Jury Award	Vanni Manushika Meheyuma	Saman Kumara Ramawickrama
Best Compere (Sinhala)		Nadeeka Karunanayake
Best Compere (Tamil)		M. Dushyanthi
Best Compere (English)		Dushaan Vaas
Best Educational and Cultural Program (Sinhala)	Udarata Menike	Athula Dissanayake; Mayuru Wanaguru
Best Documentary Program	Dumgeya	Thushara Wanasinghe
Merit Awards	Muthuhara Children's Program	Udantha Gunathilake
Merit Awards	Sikurada Rae (Sinhala program)	Nalaka Saneeka Kumara
Merit Awards	Valentine Day Special with Super Stars (Tamil program)	Sial al-Haseem
Merit Awards	Kuru Unu Niwaranaya	Doctor Kapila Suriyarachchi
Merit Awards	Vasantham TV theme song	
Merit Awards	Derana Dream Star Grand Finale	Chandik Dushmantha Weragama
Merit Certificates	Maneetham	Malan Dharmendra
Merit Certificates	Art Eka	Gihan Ranga Bandara
Merit Certificates	Thuwannam	S.M.M. Musharaf

=== Television Serial Section ===
Category	Television Serial	Recipient
Best Television Serial	Arungal	Lalith Rathnayake
Best Teledrama Direction	Arungal	Lalith Rathnayake
Best Actor	Arungal	Jayalath Manoratne
Best Actress	Arungal	Jayani Senanayake
Best Supporting Actor	Arungal	Vasantha Vittachchi
Best Supporting Actress	Arungal	Umali Thilakarathne
Best Script	Arungal	Lalith Rathnayake
Best Camera Direction	Arungal	Dhammika Dissanayake
Best Editor	Sinidu Piyapath	S. Devapriya; Indika Prasad
Best Music Director	Arungal	Sarath Wickrama
Best Art Director	Arungal	Manjula Ayagama
Best Costume Designing	Arungal	Vasantha Vittachchi
Best Singer	Arungal	D. D. Gunasena
Best Lyricist	Arungal	Kumara Liyanage
Best Sound Coordination	Arungal	Yeshantha Nelson; Tharanga Kumarasinghe
Special Jury Awards	Ridee Ittankaraya (acting)	Richard Manamudali
Special Jury Awards	Sinidu Piyapath (camera)	Palitha Perera
Merit Awards (acting)	Arungal	Mauli Fernando
Merit Awards (acting)	Ridee Ittankaraya	Udayanthi Kulatunga
Merit Awards (acting)	Sinidu Piyapath	Nadeesha Hemamali
Merit Awards (acting)	Isuru Bhawana	Ranjith de Silva
Best Single-episode Teledrama	Snehaya	Ananda Abenayake
Special Jury Award for Acting	Jeewithaya Amuththek	Nadee Kammalweera
Merit Certificates	Sasala Ima (acting)	Sachin Chathuranga
Merit Certificates	Snehaya (editing)	Jagath Weeratunga
Short films: Amateur productions (Gold)	Varshawa	Achala Priyankara
Short films: Amateur productions (Silver)	Wake Up	Punya Samarakoon
Short films: Amateur productions (Bronze)	The Beetle	Sudheera Nilanga Vithana

== See also ==
- 15th Sri Lankan Television State Awards
- 14th Sri Lankan Television State Awards
- 13th Sri Lankan Television State Awards
- 12th Sri Lankan Television State Awards
- 9th Sri Lankan Television State Awards
- 8th Sri Lankan Television State Awards
- 6th Sri Lankan Television State Awards
