= Umayangana Wickramasinghe =

Sri Lankan actress and presenter (born 1980)

Umayangana Wickramasinghe උමයංගනා වික්‍රමසිංහ
- Born: 24 October 1980 (age 45); Borella, Sri Lanka
- Education: Ragama Basilica Maha Vidyalaya; St. Paul's Girls School, Milagiriya
- Occupations: Actress, Dramatist, TV host
- Years active: 2002–present
- Parents: Sunil Wickramasinghe (father); Anula Kanthi Kumari (mother)
- Awards: Most Popular Actress

Umayangana Wickramasinghe (born 24 October 1980 Sinhala: උමයංගනා වික්‍රමසිංහ) is an actress in Sri Lankan cinema, stage drama and television as well as a television host. She is best known for the role in television serials Ithin Ita Passe and Jeewithe Lassanai.

== Personal life ==
She was born on 24 October 1980 in Borella as the eldest of the family. Her father Sunil Wickramasinghe worked at the Sri Lanka Railways and mother Anula Kanthi Kumari worked at the Sri Lanka Broadcasting Corporation. She has one younger brother, Mahesh Wickramasinghe.

She completed primary education at Basilica Maha Vidyalaya, Ragama and then secondary education at St. Paul's Girls School in the Milagiriya district of Colombo. After finishing school times, she followed a course in medicine conducted by The Ministry of Health Care and Nutrition. and began her career as a news presenter for Derana TV and then as a news presenter at Sri Satellite TV.

== Career ==
She started to act in stage dramas such as Daya Wayaman's 2002 production Neinage Suduwa conducted by the Sudarshi Institute and acted in Shakespeare dramas as "Desdemona" in Othello and as "Gertrude" in Hamlet.

Her first television appearance came through the television drama Katu Imbula, directed by Sudath Rohana. She became popular with the role "Dhananjana" in serial Jeewithe Lassanai and role "Dedunu" in serial Ithin Ita Passe. In 2010, she won the Most Popular Tele Drama Actress award at the Sumathi award ceremony for that role.

Her maiden cinema appearance came through film Uyanata Mal Genna directed by Chandrarathna Mapitigama. However, the film is not yet released. Her first screened film is 2012 film Wassane Senehasa directed by Densil Jayaweera.

She hosted the television reality program Ranaviru Real Star telecast by Rupavahini.

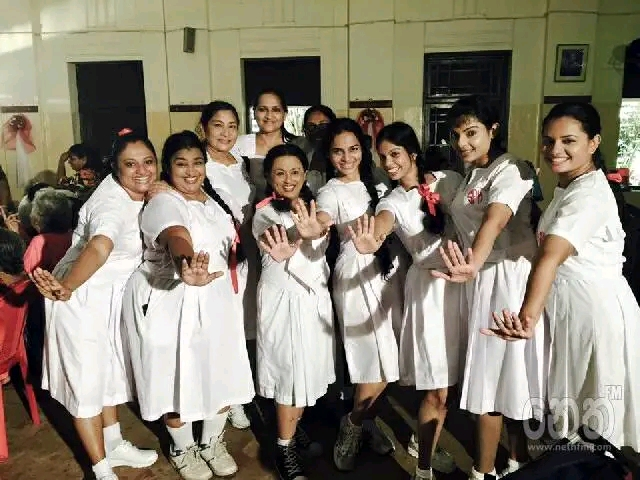

=== Selected stage dramas ===
- Maraka Linde Sawariyak (Director - Chalaka Ranasooriya)
- Raja Man Wahala (Director - Chamika Hathlahawatta )
- Thunsiya Heta Eka (361) (Director - Udayasiri Wikramarathna)

=== Selected television serials ===
- Ahanna Kenek Na
- Dewana Maw
- Ithin Eta Passe
- Jeewithe Lassanai
- Nadu Ahana Walawwa
- Nisala Sanda Numba
- Nodath Desheka Arumawanthi
- Pathini
- Peramaga Salakunu
- Piyavi
- Sewwandi
- Sil
- Sudu Andagena Kalu Awidin
- Uthuwankande Sura Saradiel
- Walakulu

== Filmography ==
| Year | Film | Role | Ref. |
|---|---|---|---|
| 2012 | Wassane Senehasa | Nirmala | |
| 2018 | Tawume Iskole | Gayathri | |
| 2020 | The Newspaper | Lady at food corner | |
| 2024 | Hora Uncle | | |
| 2024 | Wishma | | |
