= Can You Hear Me? (2020 TV series) =

2020 Sri Lankan teledrama

- Title card
- Also known as: Ahanna Kenek Na
- අහන්න කෙනෙක් නෑ
- Genre: Drama, thriller
- Created by: Sunil Costa
- Developed by: Kingston Holdings
- Directed by: Sunil Costa
- Starring: Dulan Manjula Liyanage; Roger Seneviratne; Dilhani Ekanayake; Michelle Dilhara; Shalani Tharaka; Ananda Kumara Unnehe; Madushani Warnakulasuriya; Lakshman Mendis; Shalitha Gunawardane
- Voices of: Chandumal Fernando; Upeka Nirmani
- Theme music composer: Dinesh Subasinghe
- Opening theme: Bara Awi Hangapu
- Composer: Dinesh Subasinghe
- Country of origin: Sri Lanka
- Original language: Sinhala with English subtitles
- No. of seasons: 1
- No. of episodes: 51

Production
- Executive producer: Nimal Wijesiri Senadeera
- Producer: Chinthaka Kulathunga
- Cinematography: Sisikirana Paranavitharana
- Editor: Shan Alwis
- Running time: 17 to 20 minutes

Original release
- Network: Sri Lanka Rupavahini Corporation
- Release: 5 October – 31 December 2020

Related
- Sudu Andagena Kalu Awidin

Can You Hear Me? ('Ahanna Kenek Na': Sinhala: අහන්න කෙනෙක් නෑ) is a 2020 Sri Lankan thriller teledrama broadcast on Jathika Rupavahini. The series is directed and written by Sunil Costa. It is produced by Chinthaka Kulathunga and music direction is by award winning musician Dinesh Subasinghe. The series is the first ever attempt to take Sri Lankan teledrama to international audience via social media where it is airing with English subtitles.

According to the director, the series consist with three seasons. The first season started on 5 October 2020 and aired on every weekday from Monday to Thursday from 9:00 pm to 9.30 pm. The 51st and the final episode of the season was aired on 31 December 2021. The series stars Dulan Manjula Liyanage, Roger Seneviratne, Dilhani Ekanayake, Michelle Dilhara, Shalani Tharaka, Ananda Kumara Unnehe and Other characters.

The serial has been shot in and around the locations of Haputale, Bandarawela and Nuwara Eliya areas. The serial received positive reviews from critics. During the visit to Bandarawela to complete the final episodes, their work was suddenly stopped by health authorities in the area as a complaint made by an unknown person. Even after the false news, all the members in the cast and the crew were sent on self-quarantine in the same hotel they were lodged at and PCR tests were conducted.

== Plot ==
The series follows through several characters representing different social strata. The people who meet every day in day-to-day life, the series describes their black and white qualities.

== Cast and characters ==
- Dulan Manjula Liyanage as Ashan
- Roger Seneviratne as Soori
- Dilhani Ekanayake as Kanthi
- Michelle Dilhara as Mahimi Udukumbura
- Shalani Tharaka as Sakunthala
- Ananda Kumara Unnehe as Jayasinghe
- Gihan Fernando as Saranapala
- Lakshman Mendis as Dunsten Madugalle
- Umayangana Wickramasinghe as Thilini
- Veena Jayakody as Erin
- Priyankara Rathnayake as Winson
- Chinthana Kulathunga as Dr. Nirmal
- Niroshan Wijesinghe as Ian
- Sampath Jayaweera as Ranjan
- Ajith Lokuge as Sumangala
- Mali Jayaweerage as Sirina
- Gevin Abhishek as Ayon
- Madushani Warnakulasooriya as Sumali
- Shalitha Gunawardena as Malan

== Critical response ==
The serial received positive reception from viewers. Its first episode was reported to have received 78,704 views within a few hours of its release.
