= Reset (2024 film) =

- Directed by: Danushka Kumarathunga
- Written by: Danushka Kumarathunga
- Produced by: Canton Cinema
- Starring: Lakshman Mendis Madhushanka Nuwan
- Cinematography: Sisil Maduranga
- Edited by: Sisil Maduranga
- Music by: Malitha Viraj
- Distributed by: Canton Cinema
- Release date: 7 September 2024
- Running time: 10 min
- Country: Sri Lanka
- Language: Sinhala

Reset is a 2024 Sri Lankan Drama short film directed by Danushka Kumarathunga. The film stars Lakshman Mendis and Madhusanka Nuwan.

== Plot ==
Reset tells the introspective story of Wickrama Edirisuuriya, a retired teacher burdened by unresolved emotional ties and lingering memories from his past. Living alone in a modest home, Wickrama's daily life is marked by silence, ritual, and reflection. Although the world outside continues to change, his inner world remains haunted by the ghosts of relationships that once defined his identity.

The story begins with Wickrama engaging in mundane activities—preparing tea, reading, and tending to the garden—yet there is an unspoken heaviness in his manner. He often stares into space, lost in thought, as the weight of emotional baggage grows increasingly apparent. Flashbacks and symbolic imagery hint at moments of deep personal loss, strained family connections, and a romantic relationship that ended unresolved.

The arrival of Randika, a younger man and former student, brings a new dynamic into Wickrama's life. Randika visits him to express gratitude and to share how much Wickrama's influence helped shape his path. During their conversations, Randika gently encourages Wickrama to open up, pushing him to confront parts of his past he has long suppressed. Through this relationship, the film slowly reveals the layers of Wickrama's emotional struggle—his regrets, disappointments, and unfulfilled desires.

At the heart of the narrative is the idea of "resetting" one's emotional state: Wickrama is challenged to let go of his nostalgic attachments, recognize how those unresolved emotions have stunted his present, and find peace in the now. A pivotal scene shows Wickrama silently walking into his bedroom and removing an old photograph from the wall. He stands still, as if mourning and liberating himself in the same breath, before gently placing it in a drawer and closing it.

The film ends not with resolution but with a moment of quiet transformation. Wickrama opens a window, allowing light and breeze to fill the room, symbolizing renewal. As the camera lingers on his contemplative face, the viewer is left with a subtle but profound message: the past cannot be changed, but the present offers a chance to begin again.

Reset is a meditative portrayal of grief, memory, and healing. It emphasizes that emotional freedom comes not from forgetting the past, but from acknowledging it—and choosing not to be held captive by it.

== Cast ==
- Lakshman Mendis as Wickrama Edirisuuriya
- Madhusanka Nuwan as Randika Perera

== Production ==
The script, written by Danushka, was mostly pre-production through video conferencing during the COVID-19 pandemic.The production team was then selected from students and technicians already working in the film industry at the Kelaniya University of Cinema and Television. The film was shot in two days, with an additional two months for post-production.

Reset was produced by Canton Cinema, with Danushka Kumarathunga serving as both writer and director. The film's visual style was crafted by Sisil Maduranga, who worked as both cinematographer and editor, as well as the colorist. Ajantha Alahakoon handled the art direction, contributing to the film's minimalist and symbolic visual aesthetic. Roshana De Silva served as the assistant director and also designed the film's costumes, while Nimesh Chathuranga was responsible for makeup. The sound design was led by Indika Bandara Alahakoon, with Himal Karunathilaka working as the sound recordist. The film's original score was composed by Malitha Viraj, and English subtitles were provided by Jennifer Edama.

== Release ==
Reset had its world premiere on September 7, 2024, at the 10th Jaffna International Cinema Festival held in Jaffna, Sri Lanka. The film was officially selected for the festival's National Competition section, where it was screened before an audience comprising both local and international filmmakers, critics, and cinema enthusiasts. The premiere marked the film's first public screening and introduced Reset to a wider audience on the international short film circuit.
