= Tawume Iskole =

Tawume Iskole ටවුමේ ඉස්කෝලේ
- promotional poster
- Directed by: Sunil Premaratne
- Written by: Sunil Premaratne
- Produced by: Eyon Films
- Starring: Bimal Jayakody; Tharuka Wanniarachchi; Kumara Thirimadura
- Cinematography: Buddhika Mangala
- Edited by: Anura Bandara
- Music by: Darshana Wickramatunga
- Distributed by: EAP Theaters
- Release date: 20 December 2018
- Country: Sri Lanka
- Language: Sinhala

Tawume Iskole (The Town School) (Sinhala: ටවුමේ ඉස්කෝලේ) is a 2018 Sri Lankan Sinhalese children's drama film directed by Sunil Premaratne and produced by Dhammika Atapattu for Eyon Films. It stars Bimal Jayakody and Tharuka Wanniarachchi in lead roles along with child artists Prabhashi Palliyage and Melisha Yenuli. Music composed by Darshana Wickramatunga. It is the 1319th Sri Lankan film in the Sinhalese cinema.

== Plot ==
Shanali, who lives with her parents, Suren and Nandini in a picturesque village in Kurunegala, passes the scholarship exam and is eligible to attend a popular school in Kurunegala town. Shanali's mother, Nandani is elated on this while Shanali's father, Suren doesn't like to this much. Shanali is enrolled to grade 6-B class. Her classmate Kaveesha is also a talented child like her with a very similar appearance. After few months, Shanali gradually comes to the level of Kaveesha, who has so far excelled. Kaveesha, who is quite proud of these reasons, hates Shanali.

School security officer, Siridasa is a lovable and heartiest person who provides sweets to children. However, This makes some teachers to have wrong idea about him. On the last day of school term, all kids are out for a fun school holiday. Shanali and Nipuni are waiting for their bus at school gate. Nipuni suddenly goes to her classroom to take her water bottle. Shanali goes to toilet and Kaveesha notices that. To take her revenge, she hides that Shanali is inside when school guards lock down the door. Shanali traps inside the toilet.

Without any news about Shanali, Nandani and Surendra complain to the police. Siridasa is arrested as a suspect, but later proved innocent. When Shanali's missing news went through TV, Kaveesha tells her deeds to her mother, Gayatri, who is Science teacher at same school. Gayatri didn't take any action thinking about future incidents that can destroy Kaveesha's future. Meanwhile, Shanali has a terrible time within the toilet without food and water for several days. She tries to reveal her presence in school, but everything fails.

After 5 days, Kaveesha runs to the police and explains what happened on that day. Police immediately search Shanali in the school. Shanali is found and rushed to the hospital. Gayathri is arrested and her husband, Sirinatha comes to the police with his friend, Dr. Vijay. At hospital, Vijay explains what happened 12 years ago, where both Nandani and Gayathri were attended to the hospital for labor. However, Gayathri's child has been a miscarriage and Nandani delivered a twin birth. Vijay has transferred one child to Gayathri. Therefore it was revealed that both Shanali and Kaveesha are twin sisters.

Shanali gets conscious and Kaveesha apologizes for her rude behaviour. Gayatri is released and begs Nandani not to separate Kaveesha from her. Nandani explains her that she doesn't have intention like that and Kaveesha is always their daughter. Finally, both Shanali and Kaveesha become best friends.

== Cast ==
- Prabhashi Palliyage as Shanali Gamage
- Melisha Yenuli as Kaveesha
- Bimal Jayakody as Surendra Gamage
- Tharuka Wanniarachchi as Nandani Gamage
- Kumara Thirimadura as Siridasa, school security guard
- Umayangana Wickramasinghe as Gayathri
- Jagath Galappaththi as Sirinatha
- Roshan Pilapitiya as Dr. Vijay
- Jeewani Nirupa as Manel, Shanali and Kaveesha's class teacher
- Yohani Hansika as Nipuni
- Binura Nagasinghe as Yahapala
- Susila Kottage as Suren's aunt
- Asanka Dewamithra as Police OIC
- Dimuthu Chinthaka as Police constable
- Charith Senanayake as School Principal
- Nilangani Perera as Priyanthi Nurse

== Soundtracks ==
The film consists three songs.

No.	Title	Lyrics	Singer(s)	Length
1.	"Numba Malak Duwe"	Ravi Siriwardena	Sashika Nisansala
2.	"Suranganawan Awidin"	Asanka Nuwan Sagara	Yeheni Munishika
3.	"Eka Natuwaka Mal Pokurak"	Sugath Somaweera	Harshana Dissanayake, Kumari Dassanayake
