= Hooves (film) =

- Official Poster
- Directed by: Akash Sunethkumara
- Written by: Akash Sunethkumara
- Produced by: Udeesha Dilanka
- Starring: Danushka Dias Kavishka Warnakula Sanjeewa Upendra
- Cinematography: Kasun Rathnasiri
- Music by: Ruud Hermans
- Production company: High School Junkies
- Release date: October 12, 2024 (Screamfest)
- Country: Sri Lanka
- Language: Sinhala

Hooves is a 2025 Crime Thriller Horror short film written and directed by Akash Sunethkumara. The film stars Danushka Dias, Kavishka Warnakula and Sanjeewa Upendra. The film is said to be the final short film produced by Sunethkumara's film collective, High School Junkies.

== Premise ==
Pathum hears the tale of a hoofed-demon that acts as protector of the forest. His skepticism is tested as eerie occurrences happen and he begins to question - is the Kura Raaksha merely folklore or something very real?

== Cast ==
- Danushka Dias as Pathum Gurusinghe
- Kavishka Warnakula as Ravindu
- Sanjeewa Upendra as Piyatissa
- Qaim Sinnalebbe as Young Pathum
- Ruchika Tharanga as Pathum's Father

== Release ==
The film has screened at multiple film festivals worldwide and had its Canadian premiere at the Fantasia Film Festival in Montreal. It had its Los Angeles premiere at Screamfest. The film also became Sunethkumara's third film to screen at San Diego Comic-Con's Independent Film Festival after Eidetic (2016) and The Summoning (2019).

== Future ==
In May 2024, a feature film adaptation of the short was announced to be in development. The feature is among multiple projects being developed by Sunethkumara's Maktüb Studios.
