= Wassane Senehasa =

- Sinhala: වස්සානයේ සෙනෙහස
- Directed by: Densil Jayaweera
- Written by: Densil Jayaweera
- Produced by: Cine Positive Films
- Starring: Udith Abeyratne; Umayangana Wickramasinghe; Sandani Sulakna
- Cinematography: M. A. Gafoor
- Edited by: Densil Jayaweera
- Music by: Sarath de Alwis
- Distributed by: CEL Theatres
- Release date: 9 March 2012
- Running time: 120 minutes
- Country: Sri Lanka
- Language: Sinhala

Wassane Senehasa (Sinhala: වස්සානයේ සෙනෙහස) is a 2012 Sri Lankan Sinhala romantic thriller film directed by Densil Jayaweera and co-produced by Sudath Dharmapriya and Upul Priyankara for Cine Positive Films. It stars Udith Abeyratne and Umayangana Wickramasinghe in lead roles along with Sandani Sulakna and Veena Jayakody. Music composed by Sarath de Alwis. It is the 1171st Sri Lankan film in the Sinhala cinema.

== Cast ==
- Udith Abeyratne as Pradeep Mayadunne
- Umayangana Wickramasinghe as Nirmala
- Chandika Nanayakkara as Chandana
- Udari Sathsarani as Chandana and Nirmala's daughter
- Veena Jayakody as Pradeep's mother
- Janak Premalal as Samarasekara
- Wijeratne Warakagoda as Mayadunne
- Rodney Warnakula as Siripala
- Mihira Sirithilaka as Gunapala
- Manohari Wimalathunga as Tharanga's wife
- Sriyani Mahawathe
- Gunawardena Hettiarachchi

== Soundtrack ==
No.	Title	Singer(s)	Length
1.	"Premaye Kusalane"	Dulaj Dhanushka, Senani Panchamaduri
2.	"Naa Malase Suwanda"	Buddhika Ushan, Nimanthi Chamodani
3.	"Punsanda Rallaka Pawi"	Dulaj Dhanushka, Nimanthi Chamodani, Akarshani Chandrakanthan
4.	"Divyangana Pawasannako"	Dulaj Dhanushka, Nilupili Dilhara
