= 14th Sri Lankan Television State Awards =

2019 Sri Lankan TV awards ceremony

14th Television State Awards
- Date: November 21, 2019
- Site: Nelum Pokuna Mahinda Rajapaksa Theatre, Colombo 07, Sri Lanka
- Organized by: Arts Council of Sri Lanka; State Television Advisory Council; Department of Cultural Affairs

Highlights
- Best Picture: Koombiyo
- Best Director: Lakmal Dharmaratne
- Best Actor: Thumindu Dodantenna
- Best Actress: Kalani Dodantenna
- Most awards: Independent Television Network (19)
- Most nominations: Independent Television Network

The 14th Television State Awards festival (Sinhala: 14 වැනි රූපවාහිනී රාජ්‍ය සම්මාන උලෙළ), was held to honor the television programs of 2018 Sinhala television on November 21, 2019, at the Nelum Pokuna Mahinda Rajapaksa Theatre, Colombo 07, Sri Lanka. The event was organized by the State Television Advisory Council, Arts Council of Sri Lanka, Department of Cultural Affairs, Ministry of Housing and Cultural Affairs. Ravindra Randeniya and Malini Fonseka were attended as the Chief Guests.

At the award ceremony, Dr. Lalitha Siribandhana (Sinhala Medium) and Mr. S. Vishwanathan (Tamil Medium) received the Lifetime Achievement Award.

== Awards ==
=== Media Section ===
Category	Program	Recipient
Merit Award	Alu	Doctor Kapila Sooriyarachchi
Special Jury Awards	Yatharoopa discussion Program	Suminda Thilakasena
Special Jury Awards	Aeth Pawura cultural audio-visual program	Janajeeva Wehella
Best Television Tape	Earth First	Nadeeka Wijeweera
Best Pre-promotional Video	Sirasa Lakshyapathi	Samith Basnayake
Best Animation Production	Poson Udawa animation	Dinesh Nayanajith Chandrasena
Best Children's Program	Punchi Ape Lokaya	Thusitha Vidanapathirana
Cultural Audio Visual Program	Mati Pinde Kathawa	Amith Priyanjan
Best Dubbing Program	Jack the Giant Slayer dubbing	Anura Jayantha; Kanchana Amararatne
Best Magazine Program	Sukkanama	Tharangi Athuraliya
Best Musical Program	16+	Dilan Devinda
Best Documentary Program	Cheewaraya	Samansiri Amaratunga
Best Multi-camera Production	Sirasa Junior Super Star Grand Finale	Susantha Seneviratne; Chandima Karunathilake
Best Compere (Sinhala)		Sithara Kaluarachchi
Best Compere (English)		Indeewari Amuwatte
Best News Reader (Sinhala)		Chawika Gunasekara
Best News Reader (English)		Iftia Abdul Kadhar
Best Exploratory News Reporting	News operation to find missing fishermen off Galle	Dushani Nanayakkara
Best Debating Program	Satana	Saman Dhammika Kulasena
Best Song Visualization Program	Nil Ahas Thale song	Ravindra Munasinghe
Best Sports Program	Pulser Dareventure	Chandana de Almeida
Best Academic/Research Book on Television	Jathika Roopaya	Sumith C. Dissanayake

=== Television Serial Section ===
Category	Television Serial	Recipient
Best Television Serial	Giri Durga	Diluka Prasad Gunathilake
Best Single-episode Teledrama	Eyath Dan Pansion	Ananda Abenayake
Special Jury Award for Best Teledrama	Thaththa	Hemasiri Liyanage
Merit Award	Binara Masa Ahase song of serial "Mansala"	Thushari Bolukandurage
Best Child Actor	Thaththa	Seneru Subharatha Rathnayake
Best Documentary Television Serial	Puduma Hithena Iskole	Namal Prasanna
Best Dramatic Television Serial	Koombiyo	Asanka Dodantanna
Best Teledrama Direction	Koombiyo	Lakmal Dharmaratne
Best Actor	Koombiyo	Thumindu Dodantenna
Best Actress	Sahodaraya	Kalani Dodantenna
Best Supporting Actor	Koombiyo	Kalana Gunasekara
Best Supporting Actress	Koombiyo	Yureni Noshika
Best Script	Koombiyo	Lakmal Dharmaratne
Best Script	Sahodaraya	Namal Jayasinghe
Best Art Director	Thaththa	Kanchana Sampath Wanniarachchi
Best Costume Designing	Thaththa	Wasantha Poornawansa
Best Camera Direction	Sahodaraya	Dhammika Rathnayake
Best Editor	Koombiyo	Damitha Chandrasiri
Best Music Director	Sahodaraya	Kasun Kalhara

== See also ==
- 15th Sri Lankan Television State Awards
- 13th Sri Lankan Television State Awards
- 12th Sri Lankan Television State Awards
- 9th Sri Lankan Television State Awards
- 8th Sri Lankan Television State Awards
- 7th Sri Lankan Television State Awards
- 6th Sri Lankan Television State Awards
