= 13th Sri Lankan Television State Awards =

2016 Sri Lankan TV awards ceremony

13th Television State Awards
- Date: November 21, 2016
- Site: Nelum Pokuna Mahinda Rajapaksa Theatre, Colombo 07, Sri Lanka
- Organized by: Arts Council of Sri Lanka; State Television Advisory Council; Department of Cultural Affairs

Highlights
- Best Picture: Daskon
- Best Director: Jackson Anthony
- Best Actor: Roshan Ravindra
- Best Actress: Himali Sayurangi
- Most awards: Sri Lanka Rupavahini Corporation (11)

The 13th Television State Awards festival (Sinhala: 13 වැනි රූපවාහිනී රාජ්‍ය සම්මාන උලෙළ), was held to honor the television programs of 2015 Sinhala television on November 21, 2016, at the Nelum Pokuna Mahinda Rajapaksa Theatre, Colombo 07, Sri Lanka. The event was organized by the State Television Advisory Council, Arts Council of Sri Lanka, Department of Cultural Affairs, Ministry of Housing and Cultural Affairs. Somaweera Senanayake and Iranganie Serasinghe attended as the Chief Guests.

At the award ceremony, 76 artists who excelled in forty different disciplines in the field of teledrama were awarded. Prominent dramatist Lucien Bulathsinhala received the Lifetime Achievement Award. Meanwhile, Somasiri Ilangasinghe, Giwantha Arthasad, G.N. Gunawardena, T. Sri Skandha Raja and Dharmadasa Paranagamayana were honored for their contribution to the advancement of the art of tele-drama.

== Awards ==
=== Media Section ===
Category	Program	Recipient
Best Educational Program	Heda Weda	Chulangani Hapuhinna
Best Children's Program	Katha Malla	Janaka Sujeewa Jayakody
Best Exploratory News Reporting	Ali Minis Getumata Visadum	Indika Weerakoon
Best Documentary Program	Lizards of Sri Lanka	Poojitha Dissanayake
Best Debating Program	Balaya	Sudewa Hettiarachchi
Best Magazine Program	Malima Vidulowa Nawa Dishanathiya	Sumida Thilakasena
Best Sports Program	Sudu Pena Matha Pahuru Pennuma	Mayuri Wanaguru
Best Musical Program	Dell Studio season 2 Ivor Dennis	Chinthaka Gamlath; Dilina Perera
Best Song Visualization Program	Nim Nowu Balaporoththu song	Nath Bandara
Best Television Fillers (child actor)	Ath Allan Jana Sellam	Kusal Weeramanthri
Best Television Fillers (Sinhala)	Aemathuma Aemathumak Nowannata	Jeevan Liyanage
Best Dubbing Program	Imagine That	Anuradha Sigera
Best Pre-promotional Video	Sirasa Shakthi Sahana Yathra	Magalage Nudheera Ranjith
Best Graphic Animation	Prem Saha Freddie animation	Athula Ransirilal
Best News Reader (Sinhala)		Nishantha Dilrukshi
Best News Reader (English)		Sharon Mascrenhas
Best Compere (Sinhala)		Sithuvili Sithara
Best Compere (English)		Indeewari Amuwatte
Merit Advertisement	KVC Advertisement	S. Rathnayake
Special Jury Awards (acting)	Gommana	A.M.T.D. Subhashini
Special Jury Awards (acting)	Naari	Ushani Navaratne
Special Jury Awards (acting)	Ustad David	Premasiri Wewegedara
Merit Awards	Kovul Wasanthaya	Hiru TV
Merit Awards	For Camera direction	Gayan Disantha
Merit Awards	For Magazine Visual Combinations	Yohan Indrajith
Merit Awards	Kaviya Numba	Sandali Walikanna
Special Jury Awards (multi-camera production)	For Lighting	Nandana Liyanage
Special Jury Awards (multi-camera production)	For Visual Combinations	Shehan Ranawickrama
Special Jury Awards (multi-camera production)	For Background Stage	Darshana Mendis
Short films: Amateur productions (Gold)	Wiggle Room	Krishan Kodithuwakku
Short films: Amateur productions (Silver)	Dying Room	Sudath Abeysiriwardena
Short films: Amateur productions (Bronze)	Inside Me	Madhavan Maheshwaran
Documentary films: Amateur productions (Gold)	Height and Life	Jehan Appuhamy
Documentary films: Amateur productions (Silver)	The Mystery of S. S. Worcestershire	Nuradha Jayasankha

=== Television Serial Section ===
Category	Television Serial	Recipient
Best Teledrama Direction	Daskon	Jackson Anthony
Best Actor	Daskon	Roshan Ravindra
Best Actress	Kaviya Numba	Himali Sayurangi
Best Supporting Actor	Elangata Mokada Wenne	Hemal Ranasinghe
Best Supporting Actress	Sanda Vinivida	Chamila Pieris
Best Child Actor	Sanda Vinivida	Sethini Ewanma
Best Television Serial	Sanda Vinivida	Kithsiri Alexander Cooray
Best Camera Direction	Daskon	Dhammika Rathnayake
Best Editor	Bhavanthara	Dumith Kumara Dangaragoda
Best Art Director	Daskon	Dhammika Hewaduwatte
Best Make Up	Daskon	Harsha Manjula
Best Script	Husma Saha Oxygen	Lionel Francis; Sumudu Wellalage
Best Script	Bhavanthara	Chamara Prasanna Kodithuwakku
Best Music Director	Daskon	Samantha Perera
Best Song Composition	Sath Pathini	Denister Perera
Best External Sound Mixing	Theertha Tharanaya	Priyantha Pushpakumara
Best Singer	Sath Pathini	Tissa Jayawardena
Best Lyricist	Sath Pathini	Sarath Dharmasiri
Best Single-episode Teledrama	Nawathenpola	Santhusa Liyanage
Best Documentary Television Serial	Pasuthewimen Walakinna	Jeewan Liyanage

== See also ==
- 15th Sri Lankan Television State Awards
- 14th Sri Lankan Television State Awards
- 12th Sri Lankan Television State Awards
- 9th Sri Lankan Television State Awards
- 8th Sri Lankan Television State Awards
- 7th Sri Lankan Television State Awards
- 6th Sri Lankan Television State Awards
