= Colombo International Book Fair =

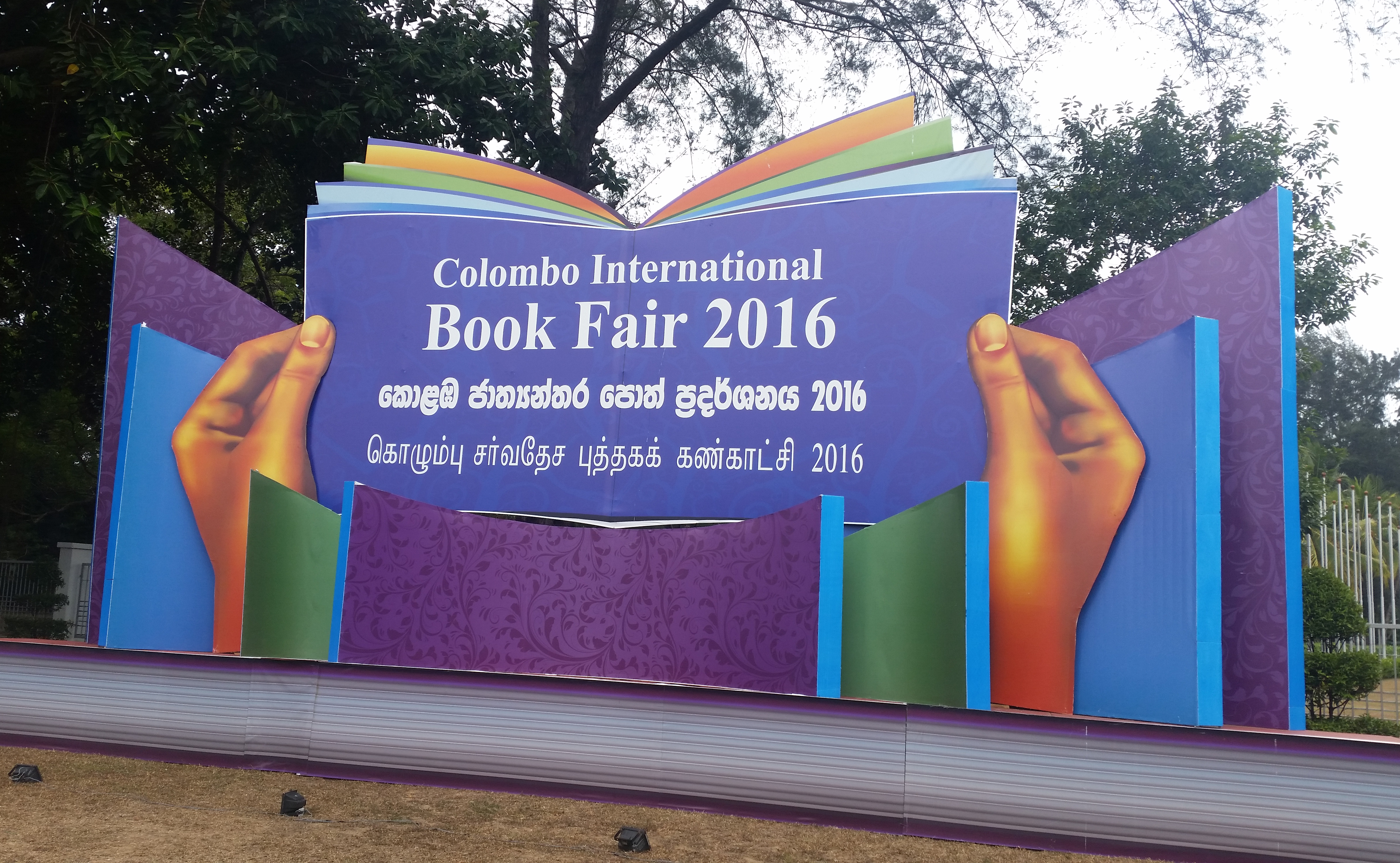
- 18th Colombo International Book Fair – 2016 held at BMICH, Colombo Sri Lanka
- Status: Active
- Genre: Multi-genre
- Frequency: Annual
- Venue: Bandaranaike Memorial International Conference Hall
- Location: Colombo
- Country: Sri Lanka
- Inaugurated: 1999
- Most recent: 2024
- Organizer: Sri Lanka Book Publishers’ Association
- Website: https://cibf.lk/

The Colombo International Book Fair, abbreviated as CIBF is an annual trade fair for books usually held in September at the Bandaranaike Memorial International Conference Hall in Colombo, Sri Lanka. Organized by the Sri Lankan Book Publishers’ Association, it is the largest book exhibition and fair in the country.

The 25th edition of Colombo International Book Fair began on September 27 and lasted till October 6.
