= Sumathi Best Teledrama Series Award =

The Sumathi Best Teledrama Series Award is presented annually in Sri Lanka by the Sumathi Group of Companies, and is associated with many commercial brands for the best Sri Lankan teledrama series of the year on the television screen.

The award was first given in 1995. The following is a list of the winners of this prestigious title since then.

Year	Teledrama Series	Producer	Ref.
1995	Dandubasnamanaya	Sunil Rathnayake	
1996	Isiwara Gedara	Sri Lanka Rupavahini	
1997	Pitagamkarayo	Tissa Abeysekara	
1998	Durganthaya	Chithra Amarathunga	
1999	Nisala Wila	Ananda Abenayake	
2000	Imadiya Mankada	Channa Abeywickrama	
2001	Kemmura	Lucky Dias	
2002	Sanda Amawakai	Ananda Abenayake	
2003	Hada Wila Sakmana	Sirasa TV	
2004	Ramya Suramya	Swarnavahini	
2006	Theth Saha Wiyali	Sri Lanka Rupavahini	
2007	Katu Imbula	Sudath Rohana	
2008	Rala Bidena Thana	Aruna Premaratne	
2009	Sathara Denek Senpathiyo	Jayantha Chandrasiri	
2010	Ridee Ittankaraya	Independent Television Network	
2011	Thaksalawa	Swarnavahini	
2012	Swayanjatha	Independent Television Network	
2013	Me Wasantha Kalayay	Independent Television Network	
2014	Appachchi	Swarnavahini	
2015	Girikula	Fahim Mawjood	
2016	Daskon	Jackson Anthony	
2017	Maddahana	Sumith Rathnayake	
2018	See Raja	Jackson Anthony	
2019	Thaththa	Nuwan Alwis; Yashodara Alwis	
2021	Weeraya Gedara Awith	Fahim Mawjood	
