= Temporal (film) =

- Official Poster
- Directed by: Akash Sunethkumara
- Written by: Akash Sunethkumara
- Produced by: Harindu Gunawardena
- Starring: Vimukthi Kiriella Ishanka Abeysekara Krishantha Mendis Lakshman Mendis
- Cinematography: Kasun Rathnasiri
- Edited by: Andrew Sean
- Music by: Ruud Hermans
- Production company: High School Junkies
- Distributed by: High School Junkies
- Release date: 12 March 2022
- Running time: 35 min
- Country: Sri Lanka
- Language: Sinhala

Temporal is a 2022 Sri Lankan science fiction short film directed by Akash Sunethkumara. The film stars Vimukthi Kiriella, Ishanka Abeysekara, Krishantha Mendis with a cameo appearance by Lakshman Mendis.

== Plot ==
On a tragic night, a physicist challenges the limits of time travel to save the woman he loves, but soon discovers its inherent dangers are far greater than he expects.

Kalpa is a physicist employed at Tusker Enterprises in the Research and Development Division where he works on a time-travel machine which he tries to make functional. He misses a night out that his girlfriend Nikita had organized to introduce him to her friends, coinciding with Mallett's Comet flying over the city. Nikita confronts him and an argument ensues, resulting in her ending the relationship. During the argument, Kalpa notices a figure run and hide behind one of the walls but he is distracted by Nikita. On his way back to the lab, he encounters the janitor who tells him that "The main fault of man is that we think we have enough time" and to "be mindful" before departing. Kalpa receives a call which he has to cut short when he notices someone run behind him into a room and his alarm goes off. Rushing to the lab, Kalpa notices that his machine is now functional. His happiness is cut short by a call from one of Nikita's friends who tells him that Nikita is dead, having met with an accident. Kalpa uses his time machine to travel back to the moment his original variant was arguing with Nikita. He realizes that he is the figure who hid behind the wall that he saw earlier and that Kalpa only has five minutes in the past before he is pulled back into current time.

Kalpa unsuccessfully tries to save Nikita twice, arriving too late to witness Nikita already dead on the road. The third time, he remembers what the janitor told him and mindfully plans the entire timing and arrives back in the past. Trying to reach his girlfriend faster, he gets into his car and rushes off, inadvertently causing her death. Right before he hits her with the car, Kalpa is pulled back into the lab, the momentum from driving carries over and he strikes the wall. Nikita lies dead on the road while Mallett's comet passes overhead.

In a post-credits scene, Bernard, the CEO of Tusker Enterprises receives Kalpa's files and is informed that Kalpa has regained consciousness.

== Cast ==
- Vimukthi Kiriella as Kalpa Keerthisinghe
- Ishanka Abeysekara as Nikita
- Krishantha Mendis as Ananda (the janitor)
- Lakshman Mendis as Bernard (Cameo Appearance)
- Anisha Barakathulla as Bernard's Assistant
- Udari Dayarathne as News Anchor
- Muthumali Perera as Himashi
- Andrew Sean as Roo
- Pasindu Bhagya Withanage as Bhagya

== Production ==
Sunethkumara explained that the story was brought to him by Harindu Gunawardena who later produced the film. It allowed him to focus on the creative side of the project and that most of the preproduction was conducted via video conferencing during the COVID-19 pandemic. Sunethkumara had always wanted to work on a time-travel scenario and saw the potential in the story after it was reworked on. The pre-production process took four months. Gunawardena explained to the Sri Lanka Daily Mirror that he had wanted to make films but did not want to try mainstream genres. He said, "When the idea of time travel came up, even though it's a paradox that has been hacked many times in the industry, the sci-fi genre is not a concept that has been explored here in Sri Lanka so it naturally felt like something to delve into and see people’s reaction to." The film was shot in three days with one day being a 17-hour shoot. Post-production took an additional four months.

== Release ==
The film had its premiere at Liberty Scope Cinemas on 7 March 2022 and was released publicly on YouTube on 12 March. Sumner Forbes of Film Threat wrote of Temporal, "I was mightily impressed by the production value that Sunethkumara brings to bear in this 30-minute film. Now, add in a few explosions, and one could easily mistake this for a Michael Bay short. The director never loses sight of the film’s strengths, which are the entertaining temporal contradictions that come from leaping back into the recent past, recalling Shane Carruth’s Primer."
