= Sudu Kaluwara =

Sudu Kaluwara සුදු කළුවර
- Directed by: Sudath Rohana
- Written by: Sudath Rohana
- Based on: N. T. Karunatilake's novel Ulu Gedara Arachchila
- Produced by: NFC Films
- Starring: Jayalath Manoratne; Sanath Gunathilake; Palitha Silva
- Cinematography: Lal Wickramarachchi
- Edited by: Elmo Halliday
- Music by: Navaratne Gamage
- Production companies: Prasad Color Lab, Madras
- Release date: 4 July 2003
- Country: Sri Lanka
- Language: Sinhala

Sudu Kaluwara (Sinhala: සුදු කළුවර) is a 2003 Sri Lankan Sinhala film directed by Sudath Rohana and produced by National Film Corporation for NFC Films. It stars Jayalath Manoratne and Sanath Gunathilake, along with Palitha Silva and W. Jayasiri. Music was composed by Navaratne Gamage. The film was filmed around Kalawana area.

This is the first cinema direction by Sudath Rohana, who is a popular teledrama director. It received mainly positive reviews from critics. It is the 1013th Sri Lankan film in the Sinhala cinema. The film has been shot around Kalawewa, Tambuththegama, and Kaltota areas.

A special programme about a preview of Sudu Kaluwara was telecast on Rupavihini on Wednesday, July 31, 2003 at 7.30 pm.

== Cast ==
- Jayalath Manoratne as Podi Nilame Appuhamy
- Sanath Gunathilake as Seemon Fernando 'Mudalali'
- Geetha Kanthi Jayakody as Lami
- Rathna Lalani Jayakody as Margaret Fernando 'Hamine'
- Indrajith Navinna as Appuhamy 'Appucha'
- Palitha Silva as Dingiri Banda
- Sandeepa Sewmini as Heen Manike
- Buddhadasa Vithanarachchi as Maddu Nilame Appuhamy
- W. Jayasiri as Arachchi
- Lal Kularatne as Heen Manike's father
- Hemasiri Liyanage as Suddhana
- Jayani Senanayake as Heen Manike's mother
- Manohari Wimalathunga as Podi's wife
- Bandula Vithanage as Monk
- Somalatha Subasinghe as Appuhamy's mother
- Damitha Saluwadana as Arachchi's wife
- Sriya Kalubowila as Maddu's wife
- Malkumari Geetharani as Podi's daughter
- Saranapala Jayasuriya as Fired watchman
- Buddhi Wickrama as Registrar
- Wally Nanayakkara as 1st auction viewer
