= Raigam Tele'es Best Teledrama Script Award =

The Raigam Tele'es Best Teledrama Script Award is a Raigam Tele'es award presented annually in Sri Lanka by the Kingdom of Raigam companies for the best Sri Lankan script writer of the year in television.

The award was first given in 2005.

== Award list in each year ==
Year	Best Script	Teledrama	Ref.
2004			
2005			
2006	Sarath Dharmasiri	Katu Imbula	
2007			
2008			
2009	Lalith Rathnayake	Arungal	
2010			
2011	Sarath Dharmasiri	Athkanda Lihiniya	
2012	Sunethra Rajakarunanayake	Dhawala Kadulla	
2013	Namal Jayasinghe	Appachchi	
2014	Aruna Premaratne	Chess	
2015	Jackson Anthony	Daskon	
2016	Lalith Rathnayake	One Way	
2017	Aruna Premaratne	Badde Kulawamiya	
2018	Namal Jayasinghe	Sahodaraya	
2019	Namal Jayasinghe	Veeraya Gedara Awith	
2020	Susitha Wijemuni	Thanamalvila Kollek	
2021	Lal Karunaratne	Sakarma	
2024	Chinthaka Dharmadasa	Meeya	
