= Manikkawatha =

2021 Sri Lankan teledrama

- title card
- මාණික්කාවත
- Genre: Drama
- Created by: Mahinda Prasad Masimbula
- Directed by: Sudath Rohana
- Starring: Jagath Chamila; Uma Aseni; Volga Kalpani; Sarath Kothalawala; Priyankara Rathnayake
- Voices of: Saman Lenin; Nilakshi Halpitiya; Sunil Edirisinghe; Abhisheka Wimalaweera Ranil Mudunkotuwa
- Theme music composer: Dr. Rathna Sri Wijesinghe
- Composer: Navaratne Gamage
- Country of origin: Sri Lanka
- Original language: Sinhala
- No. of seasons: 1
- No. of episodes: 72

Production
- Producer: Fahim Maujud
- Production location: Balangoda
- Cinematography: Thusitha Anuradha
- Editor: Jagath Weeratunga
- Running time: 20 to 23 minutes

Original release
- Network: Independent Television Network
- Release: December 18, 2021 – November 19, 2022

Manikkawatha (Sinhala: මාණික්කාවත) is a 2021 Sri Lankan drama serial broadcast on Independent Television Network. The series is directed by Sudath Rohana. It is the live action adaptation of critic's acclaimed novel by Mahinda Prasad Masimbula with the same name. It is produced by Fahim Maujud and music direction is by Navaratne Gamage. The serial stars Jagath Chamila in lead role along with Uma Aseni, Volga Kalpani, Sarath Kothalawala, W. Jayasiri and Priyankara Rathnayake make supportive roles.

== Plot ==
The show is revolves around five main characters: "Ketihami", "Pichchi", "Gunadari", "Tilakaratne" and "Senehalatha" who live in the Ratnapura area, Sabaragamuwa Province. Ketihami is an ideal villager who lives a meager life in harmony with nature. "Pichchi" is the ideal village woman, who is the wife of Ketihami. Pichchihami who was raped by a man in the palace before entangled with Ketihami. Their first born: Gunadari, is a genuine character who faces life with great courage even as a disabled woman. She loves her father dearly. She lost her eyesight when she was a child due to a leopard bite. When she becomes a teenager, she starts to plow the fields at night. The story flows through their lives to battle with changes occur in the country.

== Cast and characters ==
- Jagath Chamila as Ketihami
- Uma Aseni as Pichchi
- Volga Kalpani as Gunadari
- Sarath Kothalawala as Hathirihan Rala
- W. Jayasiri as Anthraekuruppu Garlis Arachchi
- Priyankara Rathnayake as Kirendera, Pichchi's father
- Palitha Silva
- Niroshan Wijesinghe as Rathu Nilame
- Mayura Perera as Konduruhami
- Udayanthi Kulatunga as Royna
- Sanath Wimalasiri as Kalawaney Punchi Bandara
- G. R. Perera as Kottimbulawala Silwatha
- Prageeth Rathnayake as Manansingho, Konduruhami's elder son
- Madhushan Hathlahawatte
- Thilakshani Rathnayake
- Aruni Mendis
- Janak Premalal
- Nayana Hettiarachchi as Salindu, Pichchi's mother
- Samantha Kumara Gamage
- Saman Ekanayake as Abaddha, the jaggery maker
- Roshan Pilapitiya
- Mahesh Uyanwatta
- Chathuranga Dassanayake
- Pavithra Wickramasinghe as Sochchuhami, Hathirihan Rala's wife
- Dayasiri Hettiarachchi as Village salesman at Galahitiya junction
- Udeni Chandrasiri
- Anura Bandara Rajaguru
- Richard Abeywardena
- Ruwan Wickramasinghe
- Samadara Ariyawansa
- Rukman Tillakaratne
- S. I. Samarakkody

=== Child cast ===
- Pahandi Nethara as little Gunadari
- Nesta Maneth as little Manansingho
- Savindi Nirmani
- Sanyumi Nimnadi

== Production ==
The writer of the book as well as the teledrama script is Mahinda Prasad Masimbula. He took three years to complete the book, from 2013 to 2016. Later, the book was nominated for the 2016 Swarna Pusthaka Awards as well.

The teledrama marked the comeback of award-winning director Sudath Rohana to direction after eight years. According to the director, the book reveals the great analysis of the socio-economic, political, and cultural changes that took place over a period of one hundred years from 1880 to 1980 in Sri Lanka. To obtain cinematic appearance, the screenplay was revised twelve times. While reading the book, award-winning actor Jagath Chamila came to Rohana's mind for the role of "Keti Hami". Then he selected Volga Kalpani for the blind female role, "Gunadari". Many such characters were selected while reading the book. Even when writing the script, actors were chosen for certain characters, where most of them have worked with Rohana before.

The shooting of the series was set against the backdrop of the scenic beauty of the Balangoda area. The premiere of the teledrama was held on 9 December 2021 at "Ape Gama" premises in Battaramulla. Thusitha Anuradha contributed the camera where as Jagath Weeratunga is the editor and Praveen Jayaratne with color combination. Saman Lenin, Nilakshi Halapitiya, Sunil Edirisinghe and Abhisheka Wimalaweera made singing where the lyrics composed by Dr. Rathna Sri Wijesinghe and the music of Navaratne Gamage.

== Release ==
The teledrama telecasts on Independent Television Network on every weekend from 19 December 2021 at 8.30 pm. According to director, the series will be available in YouTube with English subtitles as well as with Japanese and Chinese languages. It can also be heard on weekends from 9.30 to 10.00pm from Lakhanda radio.
