= Raigam Tele'es Best Teledrama Director Award =

The Raigam Tele'es Best Teledrama Director Award is presented annually in Sri Lanka by the Kingdom of Raigam associated with many commercial brands for the best Sri Lankan director of the year in television screen.

The award was first given in 2005. Following is a list of the winners of this prestigious title since then.

== Award list in each year ==
Year	Best Director	Teledrama	Ref.
2004			
2005			
2006	Sudath Rohana	Katu Imbula	
2007	Senesh Dissanaike Bandara	Rala Bindena Thena	
2008			
2009	Lalith Rathnayake	Arungal	
2010	Ananda Abenayake	Thaksalawa	
2011	Sarath Dharmasiri	Athkanda Lihiniya	
2012	Ananda Abenayake	Ahasin Watuna	
2013	Ananda Abenayake	Appachchi	
2014	Ananda Abenayake	Chess	
2015	Jackson Anthony	Daskon	
2016	Lalith Rathnayake	One Way	
2017	Ananda Abenayake	Badde Kulawamiya	
2018	Lakmal Darmaratne	Koombiyo	
2019	Ananda Abenayake	Veeraya Gedara Awith	
2020	Roshan Ravindra	Thanamalvila Kollek	
2021	Priyantha Fernando	Sakarma	
2024	Chandana Irugalbandara	Viyali	
