= Eidetic (film) =

EIDETIC
- Official Poster
- Directed by: Akash Sunethkumara
- Produced by: Akash Sk; Stefania Perera; Kasun Rathnasiri
- Starring: Stefania Perera; Kalhari Edirisinghe; Akash Sunethkumara; Dilshan Fonseka
- Cinematography: Kasun Rathnasiri
- Music by: FATAL
- Production company: High School Junkies
- Release date: 16 December 2016
- Running time: 16 minutes
- Country: Sri Lanka
- Language: English

Eidetic (stylized as EIDETIC) is a 2016 Sri Lankan action thriller short film written, produced and directed by Akash Sunethkumara. It was created as part of the director's MA thesis and is known for being the first Sri Lankan short film to be screened at San Diego Comic-Con's Independent Film Festival, in 2017.

== Plot ==
The film opens in medias res with Tasha, a 22-year-old woman with eidetic memory, recounting the events of the film while she is in hospital. She is being interrogated by 'The Lady', a mysterious woman, who accuses her of not completing the task she was allocated; to find an Eidetic man with an origami cat tattoo on his forearm. A flashback shows The Lady hiring Tasha for the job after promising to save her mother who is suffering from a terminal illness. Tasha tortures people who might potentially know where The Man is, eventually leading her to almost commit suicide out of regret but does not as she cannot lose her mother after having lost her father and brother to the Indian Ocean tsunami in 2004.

The Lady reveals that she knows Tasha came into contact with the 'Man'. Tasha says that she followed him to his hideouts but that he was always several steps ahead of her, leaving origami cat figures with messages taunting her. Using her Eidetic memory, Tasha recounts that the smell of iced cappuccino and a tissue from a coffee shop were present in one of his hideouts. At the coffee shop, she identifies him using his tattoo and texts the Lady who tells her that she is sending backup. Tasha follows the Man into an alleyway where he surprises her by uttering her name and disappears after an oncoming car momentarily distracts her.

The Man arrives at his hideout to discover Tasha already waiting for him and he reveals that the Lady that she is working for has already killed many others like them and that Tasha is just a pawn in her game. They are interrupted by The Lady's backup that arrives in the form of five masked men in black who pull the gun on Tasha, leading her to realize that the Man was right. The two of them team up and help each other to dispatch the assassins.

Back in the office, The Lady demands to know where The Man is and Tasha reveals that he is already there. The Man arrives and reveals himself to be Tasha's long lost brother. He forces The Lady to tell Tasha why she has been hunting Eidetics; since they are a threat to humankind in the long run as they will evolve sooner and become the dominant species. The Lady also divulges that a mother who birthed an Eidetic cannot live long as it takes a toll on her and that Tasha's mother, having birthed two, will die. Furious, Tasha almost kills The Lady but Shane prevents her. The Lady taunts Tasha that she won't survive the war that is coming to which she replies by knocking her out.

The film cuts back to the opening scene where Tasha is in the hospital with Shane who finally meets his mother before she breathes her last. The two siblings scatter her ashes and Tasha remembers that The Lady mentioned that there were more Eidetics out there and vows to find them.

In a mid-credits scene, Tasha and Shane are back in the coffee shop where they encounter three people who they identify as Eidetic after one of them solves a Rubik's Cube just like Tasha does throughout the film.

== Cast ==
- Stefania Perera
- Kalhari Edirisinghe
- Akash Sunethkumara
- Dilshan Fonseka

== Production ==
Akash Sunethkumara had been developing the concept for Eidetic for two years after he came upon an article on Quora about what it felt like to have total recall. Thinking that it would make a good film, he finally got the opportunity to create the film once he joined the Raindance MA program. For one and a half years he put together a team consisting of high school friends, thereby calling themselves the High School Junkies. Having been a fan of character-driven cinema and strong female leads, Akash created the storyline to facilitate a female protagonist with a human goal while maintaining elements unique to Sri Lanka, hence the inclusion of the 2004 Boxing Day tsunami as a plot device.

The film was shot in Negombo, Sri Lanka in July and August 2016 on a shoestring budget which was mostly spent on food and transport.

Post-production on the film took a further five months and the first trailer was released in October 2016.

== Release ==
Following a small public screening locally, the film was released online on YouTube and Vimeo in December 2016. Eidetic became the first Sri Lankan short film to be screened at San Diego Comic-Con where it competed in the Action/Adventure category and was praised for its low budget production. The film also had its UK Premiere at the 25th Raindance Film Festival and was screened at the Lanka Comic-Con in August 2017.

== Awards ==
- Hollywood Boulevard Film Festival - Best Action/Thriller Student Short - Won
- San Diego Comic-Con International Independent Film Festival - Best Action/Adventure Short - Nominated
- Raindance Film Festival - MA Showcase

== Feature film ==
According to the filmmakers' website, Eidetic is being turned into a feature film.
