= Lakshman Mendis =

Sri Lankan dramatist and businessman

Lakshman Mendis ලක්ෂ්මන් මෙන්ඩිස්
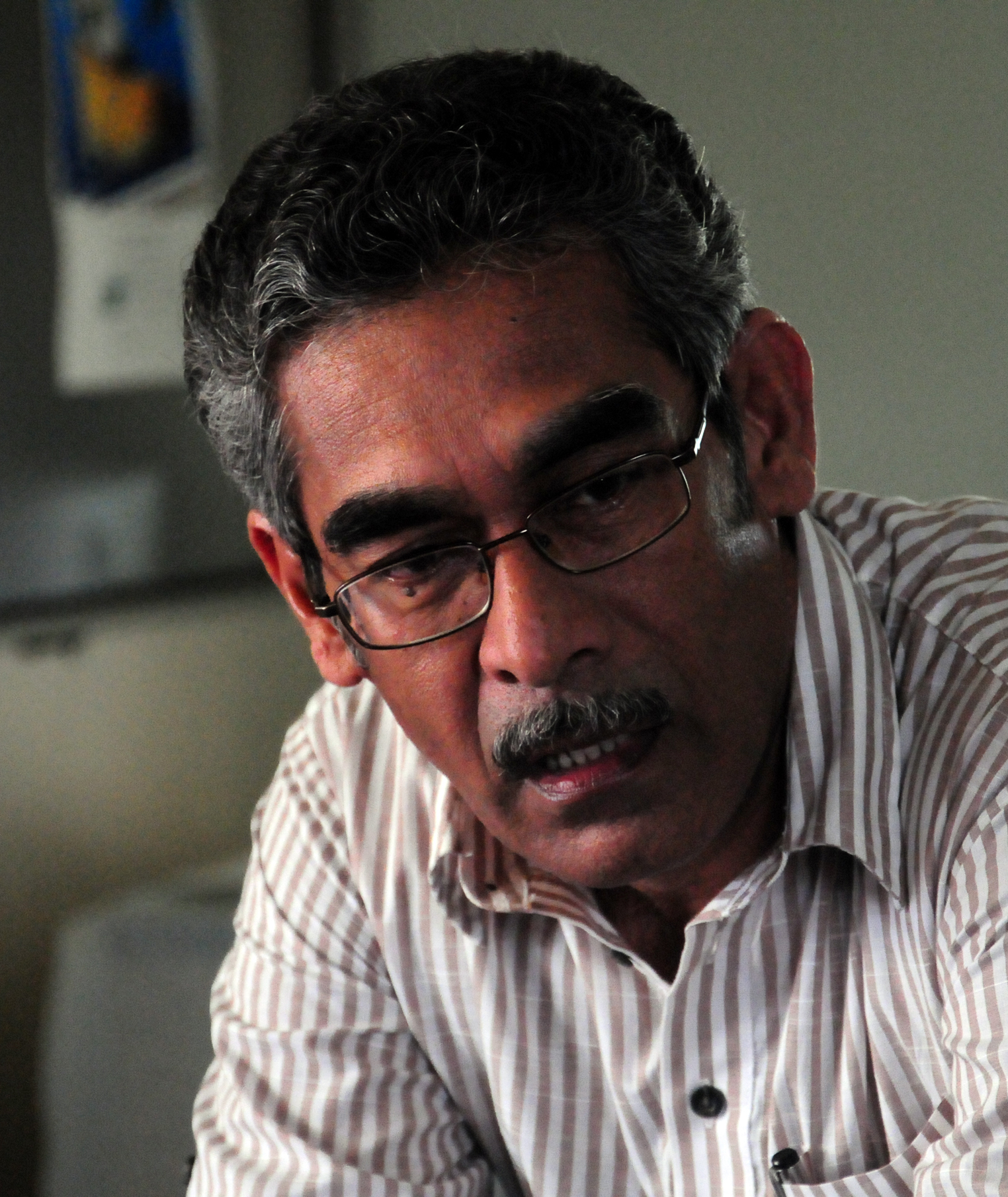
- Scene from Bahuchithwadiya
- Born: Balapaduwaduge Manukulasuriya Lakshman Mendis; May 19, 1955 (age 71); Colombo, Sri Lanka
- Education: Royal College, Colombo
- Occupations: Actor, businessman (gems, papers)
- Years active: 1985–present
- Notable work: Koombiyo
- Spouse: Geetha Shyamali
- Children: 2
- Father: Reggie Mendis
- Awards: Best Supportive Actor

Balapaduwaduge Manukulasuriya Lakshman Mendis (born 19 May 1955: Sinhala: ලක්ෂ්මන් මෙන්ඩිස්), popularly known as Lakshman Mendis, is an actor in Sri Lankan cinema, theatre and television.

== Personal life ==
Mendis was born on 19 May 1955 in Colombo, Sri Lanka. His father Reggie Mendis was a former member of the Central Committee of the Lanka Sama Samaja Party (LSSP). Born in Moratuwa, Reggie was a church clerk as a child. He became the Secretary of the Board of Education of the ancient Lanka Sama Samaja Party in the past and considered the crucial role of educating his party members to be trained and experienced in Marxism today. In the early 1940s, Reggie joined the Bolshevik Leninist Party, rising to prominence during a 1953 hartal. During a 1955 rally, Reggie was attacked and broke his hand when he was hit by an oncoming bomb while protecting Colvin R. de Silva. Reggie died on 24 January 2000.

Mendis completed education at Royal College, Colombo. Initially, he worked as a clerk in the Embilipitiya paper mill, but was expelled for political reasons. Mendis joined the Paper Mills trade unions joint committee secretary in 1977. Under the guidance of his father's friend, Mendis studied gemology and ran the gem business for 11 years, becoming a successful gem merchant in Kahawatta. Being a close friend of late Wijaya Kumarathunga, Mendis was elected as one of those three coordinating Secretaries of Mahajana Party for the electorate of Nivithigala. In 1989, during the JVP insurgency, Mendis left Kahawaththa and returned to his hometown Colombo. Mendis had already acted in five tele dramas since 1985; three of them were directed by Dr. Dharmasena Pathiraja, who used the medium as a revolutionary art. Pathiraja started his masterpiece Kadulla for the television at the same time and Mendis was involved in acting his memorable character Jundaiya in that series.

He is married to Geetha Shyamali of Balangoda. The couple has one son and one daughter. His son is studying gemology at the University of Moratuwa and is involved in the gem business. The daughter is studying psychology at the University of Cambridge, England.

== Career ==
At the age of 29, Mendis started his career in 1985 acting in a documentary tele drama Gangulen Egodata, directed by Dharmasena Pathiraja. In 1995, Pathiraja made a teledrama called Nadunana Puththu, where Mendis worked as a production manager. Inspired by that serial, Sudath Mahadivulwewa did a similar teledrama with the title Dalulana Gini. Mendis played the supportive role 'Renganathan' in the serial, even though he did not get the role of father. In 1996, he made a critics acclaimed role 'Bryan' in the film thriller film Demodara Palama directed by Dinesh Priyasad, where he later won the Best Upcoming Actor award at 24th Sarasaviya Festival. In 2007, he won the Merit award for Best Performances at 32nd Sarasaviya Festival for the role in the film Anjalika.

In 2012, he acted in the political thriller Koombiyo directed by Lakmal Darmarathna. The serial was telecast in 2016 in ITN where it became the highest rated crime television drama on IMDb database receiving a score of 9.9/10 in which resulted by majority voting 10/10. In 2016, he was invited to play the lead role in the biopic film Nidahase Piya DS directed by Suneth Malinga Lokuhewa. When the director informed Mendis about the biopic, he was bit confused as he is a member of the left wing where Mendia politically had a problem. When Mendis could not find an answer to this question, he met Pathiraja and asked him about this. After positive response from the film crew, Mendis consented to take on the role. The film was later screened in 2018 and received positive reviews for his character. In the same year, he joined the stage play Handa Nihanda produced by Jayalath Manoratne.

In 2017, Mendis acted in the drama serial Maddahana directed by Sumith Ratnayake. He won the award for the Best Supporting Actor at both Raigam Tele'es and Sumathi Awards for this role. In 2019, he was elected as the Secretary of the Sinhala Cultural Institute commonly known as Sudarshi. In 2020, he appeared in two television serials: Ahanna Kenek Na and Sudu Andagena Kalu Awidin, both received several awards at local festivals.

=== Selected television serials ===
- Ahanna Kenek Na as Dunsten Madugalle
- Ambu Daruwo
- Amuthu Dosthara
- Ehipillamak Yata
- Gangulen Egodata as Sirisena
- Indrakeelaya
- Kadulla
- Kampitha Vil
- Kaluwara Anduna
- Koombiyo as Dissanayake
- Maddahana as Jayasundara
- Maha Polowa as Kabara
- Mama Nemei Mama
- Murugasan and Rain
- One Way
- Paanamankada
- Sadgunaakaaraya
- Samanala Wasanthaya
- Sudu Andagena Kalu Awidin as Prof. Amarapala
- Vinivindimi Andura

== Filmography ==
Key
†	Denotes films that have not yet been released

Year	Film	Roles	Ref.
1994	Handana Kinkini		
1995	Demodara Palama	Bryan	
2000	Indrakeelaya	Timber seller	
2004	Mille Soya	Premasiri	
2008	Machan	Vijitha's father	
2011	Anjalika	Piyadasa	
2011	Mahindagamanaya	Chief Priest	
2011	Gamani	Villager	
2013	Peeter One	Lorenso Sylvester	
2013	Nikini Vassa	Jayasekara	
2016	Sakkarang	Arachchila	
2017	Swaroopa	Manager Mr. Solomons	
2017	Nimnayaka Hudekalawa	Wise man	
2018	Goal	Principal	
2018	Nidahase Piya DS	D. S. Senanayake	
2019	Dekala Purudu Kenek	Dinithi's father	
2022	Temporal	Mr.Bernad	
2023	Yugathra		
2023	Viyasiduru	Retired Army Officer	
2024	Mandara	Mandara's father	
2024	Minnu		
2024	Reset	Wickrama Edirisooriya	
2025	Bahuchithawadiya	Boss	
TBA	Yaathra †		
TBA	Monkey Man †		
TBA	Yathra †		
TBA	The Wife †		
