= Sudu Andagena Kalu Awidin =

- title card
- Genre: Drama, thriller, satire
- Screenplay by: Sunil Costa
- Story by: Sunil Costa
- Directed by: Sunil Costa
- Starring: Lakshman Mendis; Chandani Seneviratne; Michelle Dilhara; Umayangana Wickramasinghe
- Music by: Dinesh Subasinghe
- Country of origin: Sri Lanka
- Original language: Sinhala
- No. of episodes: 99

Production
- Producers: Manjula Kakunawela; Naduni Roosmareena; Danuska Karunathilaka
- Cinematography: Sisikirana Paranvithana
- Editor: Shan Alwis
- Running time: 20 minutes

Original release
- Network: Sri Lanka Rupavahini Corporation

Sudu Andagena Kalu Awidin (Sinhala: සුදු ඇඳගෙන කළු ඇවිදින්) also known as Sudu Adagena Kalu Awidin is a Sri Lankan television series starring Chandani Seneviratne, Michelle Dilhara, Lakshman Mendis, Umayangana Wickramasinghe broadcast on Sri Lanka Rupavahini Corporation released in 2019, directed by Sunil Costa. In 2019, the teledrama won the Most Popular Teledrama of the year Award at the 24th Sumathi Awards ceremony.

In 2020 Sudu Andagena Kalu Awidin received 14 nominations including Best Drama, Best Director, Best Actor, Best Actress, Best Up-Coming Actor, Best Up-Coming Actress, Best Music score, Best Cameraman at the Raigam Tele'es award ceremony.

== Plot ==
The teledrama portrays the story of Ayoma Michelle Dilhara coming from Madawachchiya with her mother Suba Umayangana Wickramasinghe to find her father. They travel in a bus and was dropped off in a rural village. Ayoma questions her mother Suba asking where is her aunt. But Suba pretends that she didn't say about the aunt. After asking so many questions Suba gets angry at Ayoma and accepts that she lied. Ayoma gets annoyed with Suba and she stubbornly leaves her and starts walking along the road alone. Ayoma feels scared after some time but she stays strong. She also feels as if she was being followed. Meanwhile, Suba meets Amarapala, Lakshman Mendis. He asks Suba where she is heading. She refuses to tell the truth. Amarapala invites Suba and Ayoma to his house in case if there is a problem. Later Amarapala returns home. He tells Swarna Chandani Seneviratne, about the newcomers to the village. But Swarna doesn't show any interest in it.

== Cast and characters ==
- Lakshman Mendis as Amarapala
- Chandani Seneviratne as Suwarna
- Michelle Dilhara as Ayoma
- Ananda Kumara Unnahe as Wilson
- Dulan Manjula Liyanage as Wimalasiri (Pancha)
- Umayangana Wickramasinghe as Suba
- Niroshan Wijesinghe as Rupasinghe
- Veena Jayakody
- Madushani Warnakulasuriya as Surangi
- Shalitha Gunawardena as Ranga
- Hasarinda Keshara Liyanaarachchi as Sirinatha

== Awards ==
=== Sumathi Awards ===
Year	Nominee / work	Award	Result
2019	Sunil Costa	Most Popular Teledrama	Won

=== Raigam Tele'es 2019 ===
Year	Nominee / work	Award	Result
2020	Dhanushka Karunathilaka, Manjula Kakulawala, Naduni Rosmarika	Best Teledrama of the year	Won
2020	Ananda Kumara Unnehe	Best Teledrama Actor	Won
2020	Michelle Dilhara	Best Upcoming Actress	Won
2020	Ajantha Alahakoon	Best Art Director	Won
2020	Sisikirana Pranavitharana	Best Cinematography	Won
2020	Dinesh Subasinghe	Best Music Director	Nominated
2020	Shan de Alwis	Best Editor	Nominated
2020	Umayangana Wickramasinghe	Best Actress	Nominated
2020	Dulan Manjula Liyanage	Best Upcoming Actor	Nominated
2020	Shalitha Gunawardena	Best Makeup Artist	Nominated
2020	Chamara Madushanka	Best Sound Recording	Nominated
2020	Madushani Warnakulasuriya	Best Upcoming Actress	Nominated
2020	Sunil Costa	Best Script	Nominated
2020	Sunil Costa	Best Teledrama Director	Nominated
