= Sudath Rohana =

Sri Lankan director

Sudath Rohana සුදත් රෝහණ
- Born: Kannangara Arachchige Sudath Rohana Kannangara; 8 May 1964 (age 62); Minuwangoda, Sri Lanka
- Education: Nalanda Central College, Minuwangoda
- Occupations: Actor, director, producer, screen writer, assistant director, assistant editor
- Years active: 1985–present
- Children: 2
- Parents: Kannangara Arachchige Yasaratne Kannangara (father); Hettithanthri Dona Leelawathi (mother)

Kannangara Arachchige Sudath Rohana Kannangara (sinhala: සුදත් රෝහණ; born 8 May 1964), popularly known as Sudath Rohana, is a filmmaker in Sri Lankan cinema and a television director. One of the iconic teledrama directors in Sri Lanka, Rohana has produced several critically acclaimed award-winning television serials such as Wana Wadule Wasanthaya, Beddde Gedara, Karuwala Gedara, Swayanjatha and Girikula.

Currently he is working as the chairman of Independent Television Network.

== Personal life ==
He was born on 8 May 1964 in Minuwangoda as the only child of Kannangara Arachchige Yasaratne Kannangara and Hettithanthri Dona Leelawathi. He was educated at Nalanda Central College, Minuwangoda.

He is married and the couple has two daughters. Elder daughter Kaushalya Kannangara recently got married in Australia to Ashen Jayasekara.

== Career ==
While in fifth grade at school, Rohana started to involve in school stage plays. During that period, he produced many child plays such as Ammavarune and Dedunu Palama. He won the Best Child Actor award at school for his performance in the play Dahamak Nathi Minissu. He also acted with a group of other school children and did a historical play called Yugayaka Peraliyak. After that he produced a few more plays such as Dedunu Palama, Ammavarunue and Bisawak Rajawei. His drama Bisawak Rajawei was banned by the Public Performance Board. His first public performance was in the play New York Adaraya. Meanwhile, he joined Neil Morayes' play Hamuda Baena and then in Burman Lyle's film Valampuri as a child artist. He was chosen for the lead role in Valampuri but was not allowed to leave the house by parents due to term test examinations. Then he went to make a short film about pollution called Dheewari, but it was halted due to economic difficulties.

During Rohana's roles in stage plays, he met Tissa Abeysekara. Then he worked in Abeysekara's film Viragaya as the assistant director and assistant editor. He was the assistant director of several of Abeysekera's television serials such as Gangawa Tharanaya, Dolosmahe Gangawa, Thunkal Sihinaya and Eka Gei Awurudda. He later co-directed in teledramas such as Situwarayekuge Kathawa, Ganga & Nissanka, Nonimi Suwanda and Sahan Eliya. In Rohana's teledrama Mandaram Eli, Tissa Abeysekera played the role of a university lecturer and then played as Kudapola Thero in Uthuwankande Saradiel.

Rohana started teledrama direction in 1990 by making a short story by Kamal Perera's Amaravathi and Somadasa into a teledrama titled Keti Kathawak. Later, he brought number of literary works for the creation of the teledramas including Avindu Andura (1993) and Nirannadaya (1994) by Prof. Sarath Wijesuriya, Wana Wadule Wasanthaya (1995) by Piyasena Kahandagamage, Beddde Gedara (1996) and Ambu Daruwo (2001) by Jayasena Jayakodige, Hiru Awarata Ya Nomadi (1998) by Swarnalatha Kiriwattuduwa's book "Swarna Thisaravi", Katu Imbula(2005) by Sarath Dharmasiri, Karuwala Gedara (2008) by Martin Wickramasinghe, Swayanjatha (2008) by Samaraweera Wijesinghe and Girikula (2008) by Shanthi Dissanayake. Most of his television serials won several awards at local television festivals.

It was on May 14, 1985, that the LTTE bombed Anuradhapura. He captured this moment on camera for the serial Yuga Vilakkuwa in 1994. That was during the worst period of the war. By the time the incident took place in 1985, when Anuradhapura was filmed, many changes had taken place even the billboards in the shops had to be changed and photographed in the same way as in 1985. Even the bus that was attacked by the LTTE had to be painted and photographed in the same manner. It was during the horrific war that the camera equipment was set up and Yuga Vilakkuwa was shot with the help of technicians.

During the shooting of Uthuwankande Saradiel the technical crew reached a rocky hill at Devanagala in Mawanella, which is more than five hundred feet high and heated by the sun. For the shooting of the teledrama Girikula, he selected areas like Anuradhapura and Nawagattegama which are inhabited by elephants. They visited several districts in Sri Lanka such as Dondra and Kegalle and filmed their relevant scenes. Girikula had to bear the high cost of production and also holds the record for the highest paid teledrama for airing in Sri Lanka. It cost about four hundred and twelve million rupees.

In his serial Karuwala Gedara, he built a scaffolding on the scene. He wanted to build a house on the same spot for the shooting. It took 1.4 million to build that house alone. Rohana brought two checks and backhoes for the constructions. He wanted to train the bulls to pull the two checks. There were no bulls who knew how to pull the strings in that area. Therefore, three months before the shooting, twelve bulls from the Galle area were brought in after practicing.

He made his maiden cinema direction Sudu Kaluwara which is also based on N. T. Karunatilake's novel "Ulugedara Arachchi". Rohana recreated four short stories by Martin Wickramasinghe as a teledrama Vikumsiha Kathandara which became a success. In addition, Rohana was awarded the "Swarna Pusthaka" Special Award for being the creator of the largest number of literary works through audio-visual media and for his outstanding service to nurturing literature by contributing the largest number of literary works to the subject of teledramas.

In 1993, Rohana formed the Telenis organization to advocated for the pride of art and artists in Sri Lanka. He mail 25 postcards to 25 designers and assemble on the due date for the organization. Following that meeting, a public meeting was held on December 1, 1993, at the Colombo Public Library Assembly Hall. As a result, Ranmini Tenna TV Village in Hambantota was constructed in accordance with the measures taken against the foreign teledrama wave and the tax levied on those teledramas.

Rohana also made two short films, Marusamaya in 1999 and Sebala Virudiri in 2001 to nurture the art of short films. Apart from that, he did a number of documentary television productions including: Arunalokaya, Dekona Vilakkuwa, Batu Kurullo, Maga Manawakayo, Thirasara Purawara, Sagara Soyuro, Ariya Siritha, Apa Jaya Bala, Maha Gangakata Athu Ganga, Samudura Pawura, Heta Lowata Hiru Paya, Sagara Ranahanda, Denuwara Randama, Piyageta Pela, Ape Urumaya and Tissa Lakuna.

To commemorate the 30th anniversary of Rohana's work, an honorary ceremony "Dashakathryaka Sudath Rohana Nirmalakaraya" was held at the Bandaranaike International Conference Hall on 26 November 2017 at 6.00 pm. It was organized by Sathjana Sahurda Forum.

On 27 December 2019, Rohana assumed duties as the new Chairman of the Independent Television Network.

== Directed television serials ==
Year	Film	Ref.
1990	Keti Kathawak	
1991	Mandaram Eli	
1992	Dath Kekulu Pala	
1993	Avindu Andura	
1994	Nirannadaya	
1995	Wana Wadule Wasanthaya	
1996	Beddde Gedara	
1997	Yuga Vilakkuwa	
1998	Hiru Awarata Ya Nomadi	
2000	Irabatu Tharuwa	
2001	Ambu Daruwo	
2003	Ganga Addara Kele	
2004	Eka Iththaka Mal	
2005	Katu Imbula	
2006	Uthuwankande Saradiel	
2008	Karuwala Gedara	
2010	Swayanjatha	
2012	Vikumsiha Kathandara	
2013	Girikula	
2021	Manikkawatha	

== Filmography ==
Year	Film	Role	Ref.
1976	Viragaya	Assistant director, Assistant editor	
2003	Sudu Kaluwara	Director, Screenplay writer	

== Awards ==
=== Sumathi Awards ===
Year	Nominee / work	Award	Result
2007	Katu Imbula	Best Teledrama	Won
2012	Swayanjatha	Best Teledrama	Won
2012	Swayanjatha	Best Teledrama	Won
2012	Swayanjatha	Best Teledrama Director	Won
2015	Girikula	Best Teledrama	Won

=== Raigam Tele'es ===
Year	Nominee / work	Award	Result
2007	Katu Imbula	Best Teledrama Director	Won
