= Bandaranaike Memorial International Conference Hall =

- බණ්ඩාරනායක ජාත්‍යාන්තර සම්මන්ත්‍රණ ශාලාව

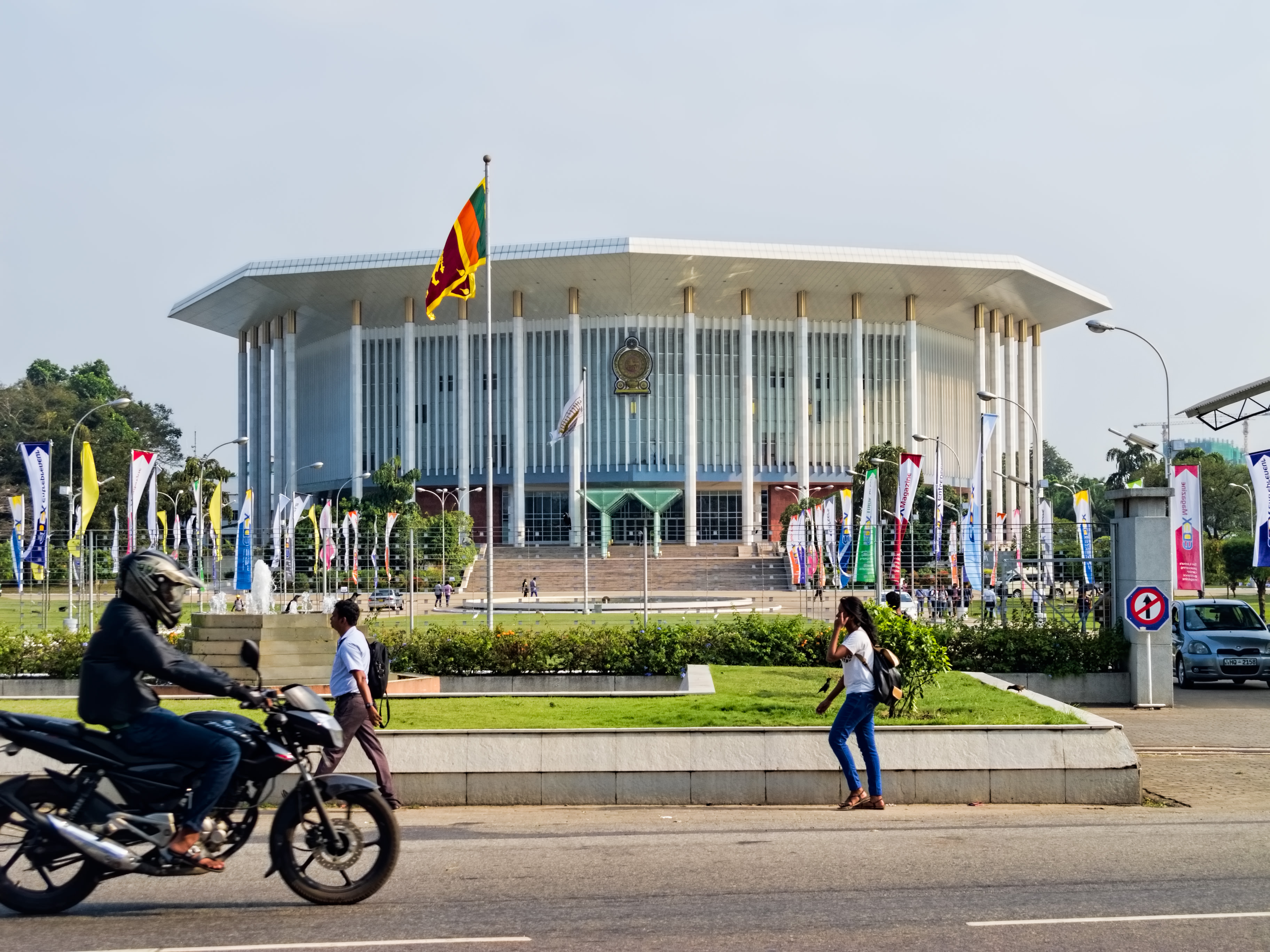
- Bandaranaike Memorial International Conference Hall in Colombo

- Location within Greater Colombo

General information
- Type: Convention center
- Location: BMICH Colombo, [Customer Services], Bauddhaloka Mawatha, Colombo 07, Colombo, Sri Lanka
- Coordinates: 06°54′06″N 79°52′22″E
- Construction started: 1970
- Opened: 1973
- Owner: Sri Lankan Government

Technical details
- Grounds: 1,500 m^{2} (16,000 sq ft)

Design and construction
- Architect: Dai Nianci

Website
- www.bmich.lk

The Bandaranaike Memorial International Conference Hall (BMICH; Sinhala: බණ්ඩාරනායක ජාත්‍යාන්තර සම්මන්ත්‍රණ ශාලාව; Tamil: பண்டாரநாயக்க சர்வதேச மாநாட்டு மண்டபம்) is a convention center located in Colombo, Sri Lanka. Built between 1970 and 1973, the convention centre was a gift from the People's Republic of China in memory of Solomon Ridgeway Dias Bandaranaike, Prime Minister (1956–1959).

The construction of the hall was carried out by a joint Sri Lankan and Chinese workforce, with a considerable portion of the building materials being imported from China.

In 1998 a smaller exhibition centre, the Sirimavo Bandaranaike Memorial Exhibition Centre, was built on the grounds as a gift from China.

== Management ==
The day-to-day operations of the BMICH are overseen by its director, who is appointed by the board of management of the S. W. R. D. Bandaranaike National Memorial Foundation (BNMF), which was established by the S. W. R. D. Bandaranaike National Memorial Foundation Act No. 2 of 1975.

By law, at its formation BNMF is exempted from all tax and duties of the Government of Sri Lanka and the local government.

=== Board of management ===
The board of management of the BNMF maintains the BMICH complex. Its board is specified by S. W. R. D. Bandaranaike National Memorial Foundation Act and includes the ex officio members the President of Sri Lanka as the chairperson, the Leader of the Opposition of Sri Lanka, the Chief Justice of the Supreme Court, the Auditor General of Sri Lanka. Non ex officio members included Sirima Bandaranaike during her lifetime (if not holding an ex officio member) and thereafter, the eldest surviving descendant of S. W. R. D. Bandaranaike willing and able to serve; and two distinguished persons in the fields of foreign affairs, law, education or the arts; nominated by Sirima Bandaranaike during her lifetime, and thereafter, by the Bandaranaike descendant.

== Facilities ==
The building has over 1,500 m^{2} (16,000 sq ft) of floorspace, and is located in the Cinnamon Gardens area of Colombo. An up-to-date library with volumes of literature on almost all subjects is available for the use of research for delegates visiting the BMICH. To facilitate with banking needs, a bank is located near the main hall. Due to the high-profile events taking place within the venue the Sri Lanka Police maintains a permanent detachment and the Mount Lavinia Hotel has a restaurant. The Sirimavo Bandaranaike Memorial Exhibition Centre has floor area covering 4,500 m^{2} (48,000 sq ft). The building consists of two exhibition halls, lobby, dining room, lounge, kitchen and other VIP amenities.

== Bandaranaike Museum ==
Located in a 190 m^{2} (2,000 sq ft) area within the main hall of the BMICH complex, is the Bandaranaike Museum containing personal artifacts of S.W.R.D. Bandaranaike and Sirima Bandaranaike. Originally commissioned in 1973 following the completion of the BMICH, it was expanded in 2005 to include artifacts of Sirima Bandaranaike, who died in 2000.

== Events ==
Several high-profile events and exhibitions have been held in the venue, including the Non-Aligned Movement Summit 16–19 August 1976, Commonwealth Heads of Government Meeting 2013. It is host to the annual EDEX Expo. It has become a popular venue for convocations ceremonies.

=== Local Events ===
There have been some local events and exhibitions held in Sirimavo Bandaranaike Memorial Exhibition Centre (SBMEC) such as

- BMICH Life Style Shopping Expo (April and December)
- Colombo International Book Fair
- Colombo Shopping Festival
- Medicare
- Wedding Show
- Bridal show
- Home & You
- Pro Food
- Facets Gem
- Colombo Motor show
- Build SL (Housing & construction expo)
- Kedella (Architectural and furniture)
- Architect

== Organisations ==
Found within the large grounds are several government and private organisations. These include:

- Bandaranaike International Diplomatic Training Institute
- Bandaranaike Centre for International Studies (BCIS)
- Bandaranaike Academy for Leadership & Public Policy (BALPP)
- LankaCert - Computer Emergency Response Team of the Sri Lankan Government
- National Police Commission
- Rakna Arakshaka Lanka Security Ltd.
