= Sarasaviya Awards =

Recurring awards for Sinhala cinema

- Trophy of the award
- Awarded for: Excellence in cinematic achievements
- Country: Sri Lanka
- Presented by: Associated Newspapers of Ceylon Limited
- First award: May 9, 1964
- Final award: 28 March 2024

Sarasaviya Awards (Sinhala: සරසවිය සම්මාන) is an award bestowed to distinguished individuals involved with the Sinhala cinema, each year by the Sarasaviya weekly newspaper in collaboration with the Associated Newspapers of Ceylon Limited (Lake House), Sri Lanka in recognition of the contributions made by them to the Sri Lankan film industry. The Sarasaviya ceremony is one of the oldest film events in Sri Lanka. The awards were first introduced in 1964. The Sarasaviya Awards have been often referred to as the Sinhala cinema industry's equivalent to the Oscars.

== History ==
The Sarasaviya film awards began in 1964 at a time when the local cinema was trying to shed its South Indian orientation and establish an indigenous identity. There was no need to go to India to make films any more and the era of Indian artists had ended too.

The first Sarasaviya film festival was held on May 9, 1964 at the Asoka Cinema Hall, Colombo, 17 years after the first Sinhala film was screened. By then a series of good Sinhala films like Podi Putha, Rekhawa, Sandeshaya, Ranmuthuduwa, Kurulubedda, Sikurutharuwa and Gamperaliya had appeared on screen. Yet the mainstream consisted of simulations of Indian productions.

The year 1960 is seen as the beginning of the golden era of Sinhala cinema. The first Sarasaviya Awards Festival had as entries not only the films screened in 1963 but also the films screened from 1960 to 1963. The best film, best director, best script-writer, best actor and best actress were honoured that day. Gamperaliya was awarded the best film and it was awarded to its producer Anton Wickremasinghe. Sir Lester James Peiris and Regi Siriwardena won the awards for best director and best script-writer, respectively for Gamperaliya. D.R. Nanayakkara was awarded best actor for his performance in Sikuru Tharuwa, another popular film in the 1964 film festival. The best actress award was received by Punya Heendeniya for her performance in Gamperaliya.

=== Suspension and 2016 resumption ===
The awards festival was suspended by the Rajapaksa administration and were resumed in 2016 after Minister Gayantha Karunathilaka announced that the festival will resume under the new government.

== Awards at present ==
In 2004, there were 33 awards in total, including the 12 prominent awards. However, this varies from year to year. Following is a brief list of the Award winners from each category for each year since 1964.

=== Prominent awards ===
- Best Picture
- Best Director
- Best Actor
- Best Actress
- Best Supporting Actor
- Best Supporting Actress
- Best Emerging Actor
- Best Emerging Actress
- Best Original Score
- Best Male Singer
- Best Female Singer
- Best Song Lyricist

=== Awards based on popularvote ===
- Best Popular Actor
- Best Popular Actress
- Best Popular Film

=== Technical awards ===
- Best Production Design
- Best Cinematography
- Best Editing
- Best Screenplay
- Best Sound
- Best Makeup

=== Lifetime awards ===
- Rana Thisara Awards

=== Special awards ===
- Ranapala Bodhinagoda Memorial Literary Awards
- Special Jury Awards
- Other Special Awards
- Lester James Peries Award for best film to be screen

=== Talent awards ===
- Merit Awards

== Winners of past Sarasaviya Awards ==
- 1st Sarasaviya Awards (held in 1964)
- 2nd Sarasaviya Awards (held in 1965)
- 3rd Sarasaviya Awards (held in 1966)
- 4th Sarasaviya Awards (held in 1967)
- 5th Sarasaviya Awards (held in 1968)
- 6th Sarasaviya Awards (held in 1969)
- 7th Sarasaviya Awards (held in 1970)
- 8th Sarasaviya Awards (held in 1980)
- 9th Sarasaviya Awards (held in 1981)
- 10th Sarasaviya Awards (held in 1982)
- 11th Sarasaviya Awards (held in 1983)
- 12th Sarasaviya Awards (held in 1984)
- 13th Sarasaviya Awards (held in 1985)
- 14th Sarasaviya Awards (held in 1986)
- 15th Sarasaviya Awards (held in 1987)
- 16th Sarasaviya Awards (held in 1988)
- 17th Sarasaviya Awards (held in 1990)
- 18th Sarasaviya Awards (held in 1989)
- 19th Sarasaviya Awards (held in 1991)
- 20th Sarasaviya Awards (held in 1992)
- 21st Sarasaviya Awards (held in 1993)
- 22nd Sarasaviya Awards (held in 1994)
- 23rd Sarasaviya Awards (held in 1995)
- 24th Sarasaviya Awards (held in 1996)
- 25th Sarasaviya Awards (held in 1998)
- 27th Sarasaviya Awards (held in 2002)
- 28th Sarasaviya Awards (held in 2003)
- 29th Sarasaviya Awards (held in 2004)
- 30th Sarasaviya Awards (held in 2005)
- 31st Sarasaviya Awards (held in 2007)
- 32nd Sarasaviya Awards (held in 2010)
- 33rd Sarasaviya Awards (held in 2016)
- 34th Sarasaviya Awards (held in 2018)
- 35th Sarasaviya Awards (held in 2024)
- 36th Sarasaviya Awards (held in 2025)
- 37th Sarasaviya Awards (held in 2026)
