= 31st Sarasaviya Awards =

2007 awards festival for Sinhala cinema

- Date: 5 April 2007
- Site: Bandaranaike Memorial International Conference Hall, Colombo
- Hosted by: Gamini Samarasinghe

Television coverage
- Network: Associated Newspapers of Ceylon Limited

The 31st Sarasaviya Awards festival (Sinhala: 31වැනි සරසවිය සම්මාන උළෙල) were held to honor the best films of both 2005 and 2006 from the Sinhala cinema industry on the 5 April 2007 at the Bandaranaike Memorial International Conference Hall, Colombo. The ceremony was hosted by Gamini Samarasinghe.

== Awards ==
=== 2005 ===
Category	Film	Recipient
Best Film	Ira Madiyama	Prasanna Vithanage
Best Director	Ira Madiyama	Prasanna Vithanage
Best Actor	Sudu Kalu Saha Alu	Mahendra Perera
Best Actress	Sudu Kalu Saha Alu	Dilhani Ekanayake
Best Supporting Actor	Guerilla Marketing	Jackson Anthony
Best Supporting Actress	Sulanga Enu Pinisa	Kaushalya Fernando
Best Script Writer	Ira Madiyama	Prasanna Liyanage
Best Cinematographer	Ira Madiyama	M. D. Mahindapala
Best Editor	Ira Madiyama	A. S. Prasad
Best Music Direction	Guerilla Marketing	Premasiri Khemadasa
Best Art Direction	Guerilla Marketing	Jagath Imbulpe
Best Makeup Artist		Ebert Wijesinghe
Best Sound Effects	Guerilla Marketing	Kalinga Gihan Perera
Best Lyricist	Sulanga	Sunil Ariyaratne
Best Female Playback Singer	Samantha	Neela Wickramasinghe
Best Emerging Actor	Ira Madiyama	Namal Jayasinghe
Best Emerging Actress	Ira Madiyama	Nadee Kammallaweera
Rana Thisara Awards		Roy de Silva
Rana Thisara Awards		Shesha Palihakkara
Ranapala Bodhinagoda Memorial Literary Awards		U. Amarasinghe
Ranapala Bodhinagoda Memorial Literary Awards		Edwin Ariyadasa
Most Popular Actor		Ranjan Ramanayake
Most Popular Actress		Sangeetha Weeraratne
Most Popular Film		Samanala Thatu

=== 2006 ===
Category	Film	Recipient
Best Film	Udugan Yamaya	Sudath Devapriya
Best Director	Udugan Yamaya	Sudath Devapriya
Best Actor	Nilambare	Ranjan Ramanayake
Best Actress	Udugan Yamaya	Chandani Seneviratne
Best Supporting Actor	Bherunda Pakshiya	Jayalath Manoratne
Best Supporting Actress	Ammawarune	Gayani Gisanthika
Best Script Writer	Udugan Yamaya	Sugath Devapriya
Best Cinematographer	Udugan Yamaya	M. D. Mahipala
Best Editor	Udugan Yamaya	Ravindra Guruge
Best Music Direction	Udugan Yamaya	Sarath Fernando
Best Art Direction	Hiripoda Wassa	Sumith Nandalal
Best Makeup Artist	Udugan Yamaya	Wasantha Vittachchi
Best Sound Effects	Bherunda Pakshiya	Lionel Gunaratne
Best Lyricist	Anjalika	Bandula Nanayakkara
Best Male Playback Singer	Anjalika	Gratien Ananda
Best Female Playback Singer	Anjalika	Uresha Ravihari
Best Emerging Actor	Nilambare	Kanchana Kodithuwakku
Best Emerging Actress	Hiri Poda Wessa	Harshani Perera
Rana Thisara Awards		Indrani Wijebandara
Rana Thisara Awards		G. D. L. Perera
Rana Thisara Awards		Lester James Peries
Ranapala Bodhinagoda Memorial Literary Awards		A. D. Ranjith Kumara
Merit Awards	Anjalika	Lakshman Mendis
Merit Awards	Udugan Yamaya	Mauli Kariyakarawana
Merit Awards	Dharma Puthra	Anusha Damayanthi
Merit Awards	Samaara	Sanjaya Nirmal
Merit Awards	Samaara	Rukmal Nirosh
Merit Awards	Hiri Poda Wassa	Pubudu Chathuranga
Most Popular Actor		Channa Perera
Most Popular Actress		Sangeetha Weeraratne
Most Popular Film		Hiri Poda Wassa
