= 17th Sarasaviya Awards =

1990 awards festival for Sinhala cinema

- Date: April 30, 1990
- Site: Elphinstone Theater, Maradana, Sri Lanka
- Directed by: A. D. Ranjith Kumara

Highlights
- Best Picture: Sagara Jalaya Madi Haduwa Oba Sanda
- Most awards: Sagara Jalaya Madi Haduwa Oba Sanda (12)
- Most nominations: Sandakada Pahana

Television coverage
- Network: Associated Newspapers of Ceylon Limited

The 17th Sarasaviya Awards festival (Sinhala: 17වැනි සරසවිය සම්මාන උලෙළ), presented by the Associated Newspapers of Ceylon Limited, was held to honor the best films of 1989 Sinhala cinema on April 30, 1990, at the Elphinstone Theater, Maradana, Sri Lanka. President Ranasinghe Premadasa was the chief guest at the awards night.

The film Sagara Jalaya Madi Haduwa Oba Sanda won most number of awards with twelve awards including Best Film, Best Director and Best Actress.

== Awards ==
Category	Film	Recipient
Best Film	Sagara Jalaya Madi Haduwa Oba Sanda	Harsha Kumara Navaratne
Best Director	Sagara Jalaya Madi Haduwa Oba Sanda	Sumitra Peries
Best Actor	Sandakada Pahana	Ravindra Randeniya
Best Actress	Sagara Jalaya Madi Haduwa Oba Sanda	Swarna Mallawarachchi
Best Supporting Actor	Sagara Jalaya Madi Haduwa Oba Sanda	H. A. Perera
Best Supporting Actress	Satana	Sriyani Amarasena
Best Emerging Actress		Dilani Abeywardana
Best Script Writer	Sagara Jalaya Madi Haduwa Oba Sanda	Lester James Peries
Best Cinematographer (black n' white film)	Newatha Api Ekwemu	Merceline S. Perera
Best Cinematographer (color film)	Chandingeth Chandiya	M. A. Gafoor
Best Editor	Sagara Jalaya Madi Haduwa Oba Sanda	Lal Piyasena
Best Art Direction	Gedara Budun Amma	Lionel Silva
Best Makeup Artist	Newatha Api Ekwemu	Bennett Jayatunga
Best Sound Effects	Satana	George Manatunga
Best Music Direction	Sandakada Pahana	Premasiri Khemadasa
Best Lyricist	Sandakada Pahana	Rambukana Siddhartha Thero
Best Male Playback Singer	Sandakada Pahana	Sunil Edirisinghe
Best Female Playback Singer	Durga	Neela Wickramasinghe
Most Popular Film	Satana	Ananda Wickramasinghe
Most Popular Actor	People's vote	Sanath Gunathilake
Most Popular Actress	People's vote	Geetha Kumarasinghe
Most Popular Emerging Actress	People's vote	Sureni Senarath
Rana Thisara Award	contribution to Sinhala cinema	K. A. W. Perera
Rana Thisara Award	contribution to Sinhala cinema	Freddie Silva
Merit Awards	Newatha Api Ekwemu	Jeevan Kumaratunga
Merit Awards	Gedara Budun Amma	Roy de Silva
Merit Awards	Sagara Jalaya Madi Haduwa Oba Sanda	Sunil Hettiarachchi
Merit Awards	Angulimala	Sithara Priyadarshani
Merit Awards	Sandakada Pahana	Susira Rathna Kumara

Category	Film
Popular films selected by readers
Popular films selected by readers	Satana
Popular films selected by readers	Durga
Popular films selected by readers	Sandakada Pahana
Popular films selected by readers	Sagara Jalaya Madi Haduwa Oba Sanda
Popular films selected by readers	Angulimala
Popular films selected by readers	Newatha Api Ekwemu
Popular films selected by readers	Chandingeth Chandiya
