= 20th Sarasaviya Awards =

1992 awards festival for Sinhala cinema

- Date: April 11, 1992
- Site: Bandaranaike Memorial International Conference Hall, Colombo 07, Sri Lanka
- Directed by: A. D. Ranjith Kumara

Highlights
- Best Picture: Kelimadala
- Most awards: Kelimadala (13)
- Most nominations: Kelimadala

Television coverage
- Network: Associated Newspapers of Ceylon Limited

The 20th Sarasaviya Awards festival (Sinhala: 20වැනි සරසවිය සම්මාන උලෙළ), presented by the Associated Newspapers of Ceylon Limited, was held to honor the best films of 1991 Sinhala cinema on April 11, 1992, at the Bandaranaike Memorial International Conference Hall, Colombo 07, Sri Lanka. President Ranasinghe Premadasa was the chief guest at the awards night.

The film Kelimadala won the most awards with thirteen including Best Film.

== Awards ==
| Category | Film | Recipient |
|---|---|---|
| Best Film | Kelimadala | Anoja Weerasinghe; Gamini Nanayakkara |
| Best Director | Kelimadala | D. B. Nihalsinghe |
| Best Actor | Golu Muhude Kunatuwa | Joe Abeywickrama |
| Best Actress | Kelimadala | Anoja Weerasinghe |
| Best Supporting Actor | Kelimadala | Jeevan Kumaratunga |
| Best Supporting Actress | Kelimadala | Veena Jayakody |
| Best Emerging Actor | Weda Barinam Wadak Na | Lal Weerasinghe |
| Best Emerging Actress | Kelimadala | Nilmini Tennakoon |
| Best Script Writer | Kelimadala | D. B. Nihalsinghe |
| Best Cinematographer (black n' white film) | Madhusamaya | K. A. Wijeratne |
| Best Cinematographer (color film) | Kelimadala | M. V. Hemapala |
| Best Editor | Kelimadala | M. S. Aliman |
| Best Art Direction | Kelimadala | K. A. Milton Perera |
| Best Makeup Artist | Kelimadala | Ebert Wijesinghe |
| Best Sound Effects | Kelimadala | Lionel Gunaratne |
| Best Music Direction | Dolosmahe Pahana | Premasiri Khemadasa |
| Best Lyricist | Madhusamaya | Bandara K. Wijethunga |
| Best Male Playback Singer | Dolosmahe Pahana | Vijaya Kumaratunga |
| Best Female Playback Singer | Dolosmahe Pahana | Neela Wickramasinghe |
| Most Popular Film | Wada Barinam Wadak Na | Christy Fernando; Mathew Fernando |
| Most Popular Actor | People's vote | Shashi Wijendra |
| Most Popular Actress | People's vote | Dilhani Ekanayake |
| Most Popular Emerging Actor | People's vote | Lal Weerasinghe |
| Most Popular Emerging Actress | People's vote | did not awarded |
| Rana Thisara Award | contribution to Sinhala cinema | Hugo Fernando |
| Rana Thisara Award | contribution to Sinhala cinema | Latha Walpola |
| Merit Awards | Kelimadala | Sumithra Rahubadde |
| Merit Awards | Ma Obe Hithawatha | Ruwan Srilal Dalpadadu |
| Merit Awards | It's Matter of Time | Roy de Silva |

| Category | Film |
|---|---|
| Popular films included in the festival | Wada Barinam Wadak Na |
| Popular films included in the festival | Salambak Handai |
| Popular films included in the festival | Kelimadala |
| Popular films included in the festival | Cheriyo Doctor |
| Popular films included in the festival | Madhusamaya |
| Popular films included in the festival | Uthura Dakuna |
