= 12th Sarasaviya Awards =

1984 awards festival for Sinhala cinema

- Date: July 21, 1984
- Site: Bandaranaike Memorial International Conference Hall, Colombo 07, Sri Lanka
- Directed by: Granville Silva

Highlights
- Best Picture: Dadayama
- Most awards: Dadayama (7)
- Most nominations: Dadayama

Television coverage
- Network: Associated Newspapers of Ceylon Limited

The 12th Sarasaviya Awards festival (Sinhala: 12වැනි සරසවිය සම්මාන උලෙළ), presented by the Associated Newspapers of Ceylon Limited, was held to honor the best films of 1983 Sinhala cinema on July 21, 1984, at the Bandaranaike Memorial International Conference Hall, Colombo 07, Sri Lanka. Honorable Speaker of the Parliament E. L. Senanayake was the chief guest at the awards night.

The film Dadayama won the most awards with seven including Best Film.

== Awards ==
Category	Film	Recipient
Best Film	Dadayama	Rabin Chandrasiri
Best Director	Dadayama	Wasantha Obesekere
Best Actor	Dadayama'	Ravindra Randeniya
Best Actress	Dadayama'	Swarna Mallawarachchi
Best Supporting Actor	Dadayama	Somy Rathnayake
Best Supporting Actress	Kaliyugaya	Trilicia Gunawardena
Best Emerging Actress	Loku Thaththa	Sureni Senarath
Best Script Writer	Thunweni Yamaya	Dharmasiri Bandaranayake
Best Cinematographer (black n' white film)	Thunweni Yamaya	Andrew Jayamanne
Best Cinematographer (color film)	Dadayama	Donald Karunaratne
Best Editor	Kaliyugaya	Gladwin Fernando
Best Art Direction	Kaliyugaya	Eral Kelly
Best Makeup Artist	Kaliyugaya	Ebert Wijesinghe
Best Sound Effects	Dadayama	K. P. K. Balasingham
Best Music Direction	Thunweni Yamaya	Premasiri Khemadasa
Best Lyricist	Athin Athata	Ajantha Ranasinghe
Best Male Playback Singer	Athin Athata	Milton Mallawarachchi
Best Female Playback Singer	Athin Athata	Neela Wickramasinghe
Most Popular Actor	People's vote	Vijaya Kumaratunga
Most Popular Actress	People's vote	Malani Fonseka
Most Popular Emerging Actress	People's vote	Sabeetha Perera
Merit Awards	Loku Thaththa	Upali Aththanayake
Merit Awards	Thunweni Yamaya	Wasantha Kotuwella
Merit Awards	Athin Athata	Rasadari Fonseka
Merit Awards	Athin Athata	Sarath Dassanayake

Category	Film
Popular films included in the festival
Popular films included in the festival	Dadayama
Popular films included in the festival	Athin Athata
Popular films included in the festival	Loku Thaththa
Popular films included in the festival	Thunweni Yamaya
Popular films included in the festival	Kaliyugaya
Popular films included in the festival	Samuganimi Ma Samiyani
Popular films included in the festival	Chandira
