= 13th Sarasaviya Awards =

1985 awards festival for Sinhala cinema

- Date: July 20, 1985
- Site: Bandaranaike Memorial International Conference Hall, Colombo 07, Sri Lanka
- Directed by: Granville Silva

Highlights
- Best Picture: Sasara Chethana
- Most awards: Sasara Chethana (7)
- Most nominations: Maya

Television coverage
- Network: Associated Newspapers of Ceylon Limited

The 13th Sarasaviya Awards festival (Sinhala: 13වැනි සරසවිය සම්මාන උලෙළ), presented by the Associated Newspapers of Ceylon Limited, was held to honor the best films of 1984 Sinhala cinema on July 20, 1985, at the Bandaranaike Memorial International Conference Hall, Colombo 07, Sri Lanka. First Lady of Sri Lanka Hema Premadasa was the chief guest at the awards night.

The film Sasara Chethana won the most awards with seven.

== Awards ==
Category	Film	Recipient
Best Film	Maya	Lester James Peries
Best Director	Maya	Sumitra Peries
Best Actor	Maya	Ravindra Randeniya
Best Actress	Deveni Gamana'	Sabeetha Perera
Best Supporting Actor	Hithawathiya	Mervyn Jayathunga
Best Supporting Actress	Hithawathiya	Anoja Weerasinghe
Best Emerging Actress	Sasara Chethana	Vishaka Siriwardana
Best Script Writer	Deveni Gamana	H.D. Premaratne
Best Cinematographer	Sasara Chethana	Sumitta Amarasinghe
Best Editor	Deveni Gamana	Jayatissa Dillimuni
Best Art Direction	Sasara Chethana	Hemapala Dharmasena
Best Sound Effects	Maya	Shesha Palihakkara
Best Music Direction	Sasara Chethana	Sarath Dassanayake
Best Lyricist	Sasara Chethana	Sunil Ariyaratne
Best Male Playback Singer	Sasara Chethana	Shelton Perera
Best Female Playback Singer	Hithawathiya	Chandrika Siriwardena
Most Popular Actor	People's vote	Vijaya Kumaratunga
Most Popular Actress	People's vote	Malani Fonseka
Most Popular Emerging Actress	People's vote	Shirani Nugera
Merit Awards	Maya	Sanath Gunathilake
Merit Awards	Batti	Nadeeka Gunasekara
Merit Awards	Batti	Rathnawali Kekunawela
Merit Awards	Sasara Chethana	Wilson Karu
Merit Awards	Maya	Dimuthu Chandani Kuruppu
Merit Awards	Sasara Chethana	Malani Fonseka

Category	Film
Popular films included in the festival
Popular films included in the festival	Hithawathiya
Popular films included in the festival	Sasara Chethana
Popular films included in the festival	Loku Thaththa
Popular films included in the festival	Rana Derana
Popular films included in the festival	Deveni Gamana
Popular films included in the festival	Podi Ralahamy
Popular films included in the festival	Maya
Popular films included in the festival	Batti
