= 19th Sarasaviya Awards =

1991 awards festival for Sinhala cinema

- Date: August 16, 1991
- Site: Bandaranaike Memorial International Conference Hall, Colombo 07, Sri Lanka
- Directed by: A. D. Ranjith Kumara

Highlights
- Best Picture: Palama Yata
- Most awards: Palama Yata (8)
- Most nominations: Palama Yata

Television coverage
- Network: Associated Newspapers of Ceylon Limited

The 19th Sarasaviya Awards festival (Sinhala: 19වැනි සරසවිය සම්මාන උලෙළ), presented by the Associated Newspapers of Ceylon Limited, was held to honor the best films of 1988 Sinhala cinema on August 16, 1991, at the Bandaranaike Memorial International Conference Hall, Colombo 07, Sri Lanka. His Excellency The President Ranasinghe Premadasa was the chief guest at the awards night.

The film Palama Yata won the most awards with eight including Best Film.

== Awards ==
Category	Film	Recipient
Best Film	Palama Yata	Geetha Kumarasinghe
Best Director	Palama Yata	H. D. Premaratne
Best Actor	Palama Yata	Sanath Gunathilake
Best Actress	Palama Yata	Geetha Kumarasinghe
Best Supporting Actor	Palama Yata	Joe Abeywickrama
Best Supporting Actress	Palama Yata	Sunethra Sarathchandra
Best Emerging Actor	Hima Gira	Ranjan Ramanayake
Best Emerging Actress	Dedunnen Samanaliyak	Dilhani Ekanayake
Best Script Writer	Palama Yata	H. D. Premaratne; Kulasena Fonseka
Best Cinematographer (black n' white film)	Hima Gira	K. D. Dayananda
Best Editor	Palama Yata	Elmo Halliday
Best Art Direction	Christhu Charithaya	Lionel Silva; Danister Perera
Best Makeup Artist	Christhu Charithaya	Shesha Palihakkara
Best Sound Effects	Christhu Charithaya	George Manatunga
Best Music Direction	Saharawe Sihinaya	Rohana Weerasinghe
Best Lyricist	Pem Rajadahana	Sunil Ariyaratne
Best Male Playback Singer	Saharawe Sihinaya	Vijaya Kumaratunga
Best Female Playback Singer	Saharawe Sihinaya	Nanda Malini
Most Popular Film	Hondin Nathnam Narakin	Thilak Eparatne
Most Popular Actor	People's vote	Freddie Silva
Most Popular Actress	People's vote	Geetha Kumarasinghe
Most Popular Emerging Actor	People's vote	Ranjan Ramanayake
Most Popular Emerging Actress	People's vote	Manel Chandralatha
Rana Thisara Award	contribution to Sinhala cinema	Ravindra Randeniya
Rana Thisara Award	contribution to Sinhala cinema	Denawaka Hamine
Merit Awards	Madhu Sihina	Roy de Silva
Merit Awards	Dedunnen Samanaliyak	Ajith Jinadasa
Merit Awards	Hondin Nathnam Narakin	Nihal Silva
Merit Awards	Chandi Raja	Harshani Dissanayake

Category	Film
Popular films included in the festival
Popular films included in the festival	Hondin Nathnam Narakin
Popular films included in the festival	Palama Yata
Popular films included in the festival	Christhu Charithaya
Popular films included in the festival	Madhu Sihina
Popular films included in the festival	Chandi Raja
Popular films included in the festival	Honda Honda Sellam
Popular films included in the festival	Dese Mal Pipila
