= 32nd Sarasaviya Awards =

2010 awards festival for Sinhala cinema

- Date: 2 January 2010
- Site: Bandaranaike Memorial International Conference Hall, Colombo
- Hosted by: Gamini Samarasinghe

Television coverage
- Network: Associated Newspapers of Ceylon Limited

The 32nd Sarasaviya Awards festival (Sinhala: 32වැනි සරසවිය සම්මාන උළෙල) were held to honor the best films of both 2007 and 2008 from the Sinhala cinema industry on 2 January 2010 at the Bandaranaike Memorial International Conference Hall, Colombo. The ceremony was hosted by Gamini Samarasinghe.

== Awards ==
=== 2007 ===
Category	Film	Recipient
Best Film	Aganthukaya	Vasantha Obeysekara
Best Director	Aganthukaya	Vasantha Obeysekara
Best Actor	Aganthukaya	Saumya Liyanage
Best Actress	Uppalawanna	Sangeetha Weeraratne
Best Supporting Actor	Aganthukaya	Sanath Gunathilaka
Best Supporting Actress	Uppalawanna	Chandani Senaviratne
Best Script Writer	Aganthukaya	Vasantha Obeysekara
Best Cinematographer	Sankara	Palitha Perera
Best Editor	Sankara	Ravindra Guruge
Best Music Direction	Uppalawanna	Nawarathne Gamage
Best Art Direction	Sankara	Sunil Wijeratne
Best Makeup Artist	Nisalagira	Mal Shanaka Pieris
Best Sound Effects	Sankara	Kalinga Gihan Perera
Best Lyricist	Aganthukaya	Rathna Sri Wijesinghe
Best Male Playback Singer	Sikuru Hathe	Kasun Kalhara
Best Female Playback Singer	Asai Man Piyabanna	Uresha Ravihari
Best Emerging Actor	Sankara	Thumindu Dodantenna
Best Emerging Actress	Sikuru Hathe	Himali Sayurangi
Merit Awards	Uppalawanna	Chandra Kaluarachchi
Merit Awards	Sankara	Milton Perera
Merit Awards	Sikuru Hathe	Hematha Iriyagama
Merit Awards	Ran Kevita	Mahil Perera
Merit Awards	Yahaluwo	Himasal Sathsara Liyanage
Merit Awards	Tharaka Mal & Asai Man Piyabanna	Nalin Pradeep Udawela
Most Popular Actor		Vijaya Nandasiri
Most Popular Actress		Sangeetha Weeraratne
Most Popular Film		Asai Man Piyabanna

=== 2008 ===
Category	Film	Recipient
Best Film	Machan	Prasanna Vithanage
Best Director	Walapatala	Vjitha Gunaratne
Best Actor	Machan	Dharmapriya Dias
Best Actress	Aba	Dulani Anuradha
Best Supporting Actor	Walapatala	Saumya Liyanage
Best Supporting Actress	Aba	Malani Fonseka
Best Script Writer	Machan	Ruwanthie De Chickera
Best Cinematographer	Aba	Suminda Weerasinghe
Best Editor	Machan	Masahiro Hirakubo
Best Music Direction	Aba	Nadeeka Guruge
Best Art Direction	Walapatala	Lal Harindranath
Best Makeup Artist	Machan	Ebert Wijesinghe
Best Sound Effects	Aba	Kalinga Gihan Perera
Best Lyricist	Aba	Sunil Ariyaratne
Best Male Playback Singer	Siri Raja Siri	Edward Jayakody
Best Female Playback Singer	Rosa Kale	Uresha Ravihari
Best Emerging Actor	Machan	Darshan Dharmaraj
Best Emerging Actress	Heart FM (film)	Samanalee Fonseka
Merit Awards	Aba	Senaka Tytus
Merit Awards	Aba	Sajitha Anuththara
Merit Awards	Aba	Udeni Subodhi Kumara
Merit Awards	Ran Kevita	Mahil Perera
Merit Awards	Aba	Sri Kariyawasam
Merit Awards	Aba	Nalin Kasmira
Merit Awards	Siri Raja Siri	Kokila Pawan Jayasuriya
Most Popular Film		Aba
