= 22nd Sarasaviya Awards =

1994 awards festival for Sinhala cinema

- Date: April 2, 1994
- Site: Bandaranaike Memorial International Conference Hall, Colombo 07, Sri Lanka
- Directed by: A. D. Ranjith Kumara

Highlights
- Best Picture: Guru Gedara
- Most awards: Saptha Kanya (6)
- Most nominations: Saptha Kanya

Television coverage
- Network: Associated Newspapers of Ceylon Limited

The 22nd Sarasaviya Awards festival (Sinhala: 22වැනි සරසවිය සම්මාන උලෙළ), presented by the Associated Newspapers of Ceylon Limited, was held to honor the best films of 1993 Sinhala cinema on April 2, 1994, at the Bandaranaike Memorial International Conference Hall, Colombo 07, Sri Lanka. Minister of Housing and Construction Sirisena Cooray was the chief guest at the awards nights.

The film Guru Gedara won the best awards with five including Best Film whereas film Saptha Kanya received six awards.

== Awards ==
Category	Film	Recipient
Best Film	Guru Gedara	M. H. Piyasena
Best Director	Guru Gedara	Vijaya Dharma Sri
Best Actor	Guru Gedara	Asoka Peiris
Best Actress	Guru Gedara	Anoja Weerasinghe
Best Supporting Actor	Saptha Kanya	Tony Ranasinghe
Best Supporting Actress	Chaya	Nadeeka Gunasekara
Best Emerging Actor	Prathigna	Rajiv Nanayakkara
Best Emerging Actress	Saptha Kanya	Sangeetha Weeraratne
Best Script Writer	Guru Gedara	Tissa Abeysekara
Best Cinematographer (color film)	Surabidena	Suminda Weerasinghe
Best Editor	Saptha Kanya	Elmo Halliday
Best Art Direction	Surabidena	Ranjith Nayanananda
Best Makeup Artist	Surabidena	Ebert Wijesinghe
Best Sound Effects	Chaya	George Manatunga
Best Music Direction	Chaya	Sarath Dassanayake
Best Lyricist	Saptha Kanya	Ajantha Ranasinghe
Best Male Playback Singer	Saptha Kanya	Rookantha Gunathilake
Best Female Playback Singer	Chaya	Chandrika Siriwardena
Rana Thisara Award	contribution to Sinhala cinema	Tony Ranasinghe
Rana Thisara Award	contribution to Sinhala cinema	W.D. Amaradeva
Merit Awards	Chaya	Sunil Sarath Perera
Merit Awards	Guru Geethaya	Yashoda Wimaladharma
Merit Awards	Saptha Kanya	Kamal Addararachchi
Merit Awards	Prathigna	Lucky Dias
Merit Awards	Thrishule	Sujani Menaka
