= 9th Sarasaviya Awards =

1981 awards festival for Sinhala cinema

- Date: April 4, 1981
- Site: Bandaranaike Memorial International Conference Hall, Colombo 07, Sri Lanka
- Directed by: Granville Silva

Highlights
- Best Picture: Ganga Addara
- Most awards: Ganga Addara (10)
- Most nominations: Ganga Addara

Television coverage
- Network: Associated Newspapers of Ceylon Limited

The 9th Sarasaviya Awards festival (Sinhala: 9වැනි සරසවිය සම්මාන උලෙළ), presented by the Associated Newspapers of Ceylon Limited, was held to honor the best films of 1980 Sinhala cinema on April 4, 1981, at the Bandaranaike Memorial International Conference Hall, Colombo 07, Sri Lanka. Prime Minister Ranasinghe Premadasa was the chief guest at the awards night.

The film Ganga Addara won the most awards with seven including Best Film.

== Awards ==
Category	Film	Recipient
Best Film	Ganga Addara	Milina Sumapthipala
Best Director	Ganga Addara	Sumitra Peiris
Best Actor	Uthumaneni'	Gamini Fonseka
Best Actress	Ganga Addara'	Vasanthi Chathurani
Best Supporting Actor	Hansa Vilak	Henry Jayasena
Best Supporting Actress	Mayurige Kathawa	Shanthi Lekha
Best Script Writer	Hansa Vilak	Dharmasiri Bandaranayake
Best Cinematographer	Ganga Addara	Donald Karunaratne
Best Editor	Ganga Addara	Lal Piyasena
Best Art Direction	Ganga Addara	Hemapala Dharmasena
Best Makeup Artist	Ganga Addara	Ebert Wijesinghe
Best Sound Effects	Ganga Addara	Nimal Weerakkody
Best Music Direction	Ganga Addara	Nimal Mendis
Best Lyricist	Ganga Addara	Augustus Vinayagaratnam
Best Male Playback Singer	Siribo Ayya	W. D. Amaradeva
Best Female Playback Singer	Siribo Ayya	Nanda Malini
Most Popular Film	People's vote	Uthumaneni
Most Popular Actor	People's vote	Gamini Fonseka
Most Popular Actress	People's vote	Malani Fonseka

Category	Film
Popular Awards from Reader Vote
Popular Awards from Reader Vote	Uthumaneni
Popular Awards from Reader Vote	Ganga Addara
Popular Awards from Reader Vote	Mayurige Kathawa
Popular Awards from Reader Vote	Thunweni Yamaya
Popular Awards from Reader Vote	Hansa Vilak
Popular Awards from Reader Vote	Siribo Ayya
Popular Awards from Reader Vote	Parithyaga
Popular Awards from Reader Vote	Raktha
