= 16th Sarasaviya Awards =

1988 awards festival for Sinhala cinema

- Date: July 23, 1988
- Site: Bandaranaike Memorial International Conference Hall, Colombo 07, Sri Lanka
- Directed by: Granville Silva

Highlights
- Best Picture: Viragaya
- Most awards: Viragaya (12)
- Most nominations: Viragaya

Television coverage
- Network: Associated Newspapers of Ceylon Limited

The 16th Sarasaviya Awards festival (Sinhala: 16වැනි සරසවිය සම්මාන උලෙළ), presented by the Associated Newspapers of Ceylon Limited, was held to honor the best films of 1987 Sinhala cinema on July 23, 1988, at the Bandaranaike Memorial International Conference Hall, Colombo 07, Sri Lanka. Minister of National Defense, Trade and Shipping Lalith Athulathmudali was the chief guest at the awards night.

The film Viragaya won most number of awards with twelve awards including Best Film, Best Director and Best Actor.

== Awards ==
| Category | Film | Recipient |
|---|---|---|
| Best Film | Viragaya | Chandra Mallawarachchi |
| Best Director | Viragaya | Tissa Abeysekara |
| Best Actor | Viragaya | Sanath Gunathilake |
| Best Actress | Podi Vijay | Sabeetha Perera |
| Best Supporting Actor | Mangala Thegga | Jayalath Manoratne |
| Best Supporting Actress | Viragaya | Sunethra Sarathchandra |
| Best Emerging Actress | | Sanoja Bibile |
| Best Script Writer | Viragaya | Tissa Abeysekara |
| Best Cinematographer (black n' white film) | Mangala Thegga | Andrew Jayamanne |
| Best Cinematographer (color film) | Janelaya | Darren Okada |
| Best Editor | Viragaya | Lal Piyasena |
| Best Art Direction | Viragaya | K. A. Milton Perera |
| Best Makeup Artist | Viragaya | Shesha Palihakkara |
| Best Sound Effects | Janelaya | George Manatunga |
| Best Music Direction | Viragaya | Sarath Fernando |
| Best Lyricist | Viragaya | Sunil Ariyaratne |
| Best Male Playback Singer | Viragaya | Sanath Nandasiri |
| Best Female Playback Singer | | Not awarded |
| Most Popular Film | Kavuluwa | A. S. P. Liyanage |
| Most Popular Actor | People's vote | Vijaya Kumaratunga |
| Most Popular Actress | People's vote | Geetha Kumarasinghe |
| Most Popular Emerging Actress | People's vote | Maureen Charuni |
| Rana Thisara Award | contribution to Sinhala cinema | Vijaya Kumaratunga |
| Rana Thisara Award | contribution to Sinhala cinema | [[]] |
| Merit Awards | Viragaya | Asoka Peiris |
| Merit Awards | Ahinsa | Nadeeka Gunasekara |
| Merit Awards | Janelaya | Razi Anwar |
| Merit Awards | Janelaya | Ruby de Mel |

| Category | Film |
|---|---|
Popular films selected by readers
| Popular films selected by readers | Kawuluwa |
| Popular films selected by readers | Viragaya |
| Popular films selected by readers | Ahinsa |
| Popular films selected by readers | Janelaya |
| Popular films selected by readers | Hitha Honda Chandiya |
| Popular films selected by readers | Raja Wedakarayo |
| Popular films selected by readers | Obatai Priye Adare |
