= 15th Sarasaviya Awards =

1987 awards festival for Sinhala cinema

- Date: July 25, 1987
- Site: Bandaranaike Memorial International Conference Hall, Colombo 07, Sri Lanka
- Directed by: Granville Silva

Highlights
- Best Picture: Maldeniye Simieon
- Most awards: Koti Waligaya (10)
- Most nominations: Koti Waligaya

Television coverage
- Network: Associated Newspapers of Ceylon Limited

The 15th Sarasaviya Awards festival (Sinhala: 15වැනි සරසවිය සම්මාන උලෙළ), presented by the Associated Newspapers of Ceylon Limited, was held to honor the best films of 1986 Sinhala cinema on July 25, 1987, at the Bandaranaike Memorial International Conference Hall, Colombo 07, Sri Lanka. Minister of Lands and Land Development Gamini Dissanayake was the chief guest at the awards night.

Even though the film Maldeniye Simieon won seven awards including Best Film, Best Director, Best Actor and Best Actress, most number of awards were received to the film Koti Waligaya which included eleven awards.

== Awards ==
Category	Film	Recipient
Best Film	Maldeniye Simieon	Vijaya Ramanayake
Best Director	Maldeniye Simieon	D. B. Nihalsinghe
Best Actor	Maldeniye Simieon	Joe Abeywickrama
Best Actress	Maldeniye Simieon	Anoja Weerasinghe
Best Supporting Actor	Pooja	Amarasiri Kalansuriya
Best Supporting Actress	Koti Waligaya	Anjela Seneviratne
Best Emerging Actress	Pooja	Geetha Kanthi Jayakody
Best Script Writer	Koti Waligaya	Tony Ranasinghe
Best Cinematographer (black n' white film)	Koti Waligaya	K. D. Dayananda
Best Cinematographer (color film)	Maldeniye Simieon	D. B. Nihalsinghe
Best Editor	Koti Waligaya	M. S. Aliman
Best Art Direction	Maldeniye Simieon	Lionel Silva
Best Makeup Artist	Maldeniye Simieon	Ranjith Manthagaweera
Best Sound Effects	Koti Waligaya	George Manatunga
Best Music Direction	Adara Hasuna	Rohana Weerasinghe
Best Lyricist	Pooja	Dharmasiri Gamage
Best Male Playback Singer	Pooja	Sunil Edirisinghe
Best Female Playback Singer	Yali Hamuwennai	Chandralekha Perera
Most Popular Film	Koti Waligaya	Peter Perera
Most Popular Actor	People's vote	Vijaya Kumaratunga
Most Popular Actress	People's vote	Sabeetha Perera
Most Popular Emerging Actress	People's vote	Damayanthi Fonseka
Rana Thisara Award	contribution to Sinhala cinema	Lester James Peries
Rana Thisara Award	contribution to Sinhala cinema	Anoja Weerasinghe
Merit Awards	Koti Waligaya	Tony Ranasinghe
Merit Awards	Koti Waligaya	Rex Kodippili
Merit Awards	Koti Waligaya	Senaka Perera
Merit Awards	Koti Waligaya	Sathischandra Edirisinghe

Category	Film
Popular films included in the festival
Popular films included in the festival	Koti Waligaya
Popular films included in the festival	Maldeniye Simieon
Popular films included in the festival	Peralikarayo
Popular films included in the festival	Jaya Apatai
Popular films included in the festival	Mal Warusa
Popular films included in the festival	Dinuma
Popular films included in the festival	Yali Hamuwennai
