= 33rd Sarasaviya Awards =

2016 awards festival for Sinhala cinema

- 33rd Sarasaviya Awards
- Date: December 15, 2016
- Site: Nelum Pokuna Mahinda Rajapaksa Theatre, Colombo 07, Sri Lanka
- Hosted by: Kamal Addararachchi; Sangeetha Weeraratne

Highlights
- Best Picture: Maharaja Gemunu
- Most awards: Maharaja Gemunu (11)

Television coverage
- Network: Associated Newspapers of Ceylon Limited

The 33rd Sarasaviya Awards festival (Sinhala: 33වැනි සරසවිය සම්මාන උලෙළ), presented by the Associated Newspapers of Ceylon Limited, was held to honor the best films of 2015 Sinhala cinema on December 15, 2016, at the Nelum Pokuna Mahinda Rajapaksa Theatre, Colombo 07, Sri Lanka at 6:00 p.m. The ceremony was hosted by Kamal Addararachchi and Sangeetha Weeraratne. Prime Minister Ranil Wickramasinghe was the chief guest at the awards nights.

Maharaja Gemunu won the most awards with eleven including Best Film. Other winners included Oba Nathuwa Oba Ekka and Ho Gaana Pokuna with three awards.

== Awards ==
Category	Film	Recipient
Best Film	Maharaja Gemunu	Gunapala Rathnasekara
Best Director	Oba Nathuwa Oba Ekka	Prasanna Vithanage
Best Actor	Maharaja Gemunu	Jackson Anthony
Best Actress	Oba Nathuwa Oba Ekka	Anjali Patil
Special Jury Award	Pravegaya	Hemal Ranasinghe
Best Supporting Actor	Ho Gaana Pokuna	Jayalath Manoratne
Best Supporting Actress	Pravegaya	Damitha Abeyratne
Best Script Writer	Oba Nathuwa Oba Ekka	Prasanna Vithanage
Best Cinematographer	Maharaja Gemunu	Ruwan Costa
Best Editor	Maharaja Gemunu	Ravindra Guruge
Lester James Pieris Award		Sayapethi Kusuma
Abhimani Award		W. D. Amaradeva
Abhimani Award		Nanda Malini
Abhimani Award		Punya Heendeniya
Abhimani Award		Sumitra Peries
Abhimani Award		Lester James Peries
Ranapala Bodhinagoda Memorial Literary Award		Gamini Veragama
Rana Thisara Award		Sugathapala Senarath Yapa
Rana Thisara Award		Sujatha Aththanayake
Best Music Direction	Maharaja Gemunu	Nadeeka Guruge
Best Art Direction	Maharaja Gemunu	Rohan Samara Divakara
Best Makeup Artist	Maharaja Gemunu	Jayantha Ranawaka
Best Sound Effects	Maharaja Gemunu	Aruna Priyashantha Kalu Arachchi
Best Lyricist	Maharaja Gemunu	Pallegama Hemarathana Thero
Best Male Playback Singer	Mage Yalu Malu	Edward Jayakody
Best Female Playback Singer	Maharaja Gemunu	Nirosha Virajini
Best Emerging Actor	Ira Sewaya	Ishara Wickramasinghe
Best Emerging Actress	Ho Gaana Pokuna	Anya Subasinghe
Merit Awards	Me Wage Adarayak	Dinakshie Priyasad
Merit Awards	Suhada Koka	Lal Kularatne
Merit Awards	Address Na	Sirimal Robin Sandeep
Merit Awards	Ho Gaana Pokuna	Sakya Kumarathunga
Merit Awards		Maheshwari Rutnam
Merit Awards	Ho Gana Pokuna	Dinesh Subasinghe
Most Popular Film		Maharaja Gemunu
