= 11th Sarasaviya Awards =

1983 awards festival for Sinhala cinema

- Date: October 1, 1983
- Site: Bandaranaike Memorial International Conference Hall, Colombo 07, Sri Lanka
- Directed by: Granville Silva

Highlights
- Best Picture: Yasa Isuru
- Most awards: Yasa Isuru (7)
- Most nominations: Yasa Isuru

Television coverage
- Network: Associated Newspapers of Ceylon Limited

The 11th Sarasaviya Awards festival (Sinhala: 11වැනි සරසවිය සම්මාන උලෙළ), presented by the Associated Newspapers of Ceylon Limited, was held to honor the best films of 1982 Sinhala cinema on October 1, 1983, at the Bandaranaike Memorial International Conference Hall, Colombo 07, Sri Lanka. Minister of State Anandatissa de Alwis was the chief guest at the awards night.

The film Yasa Isuru won the most awards with seven.

== Awards ==
Category	Film	Recipient
Best Film	Mahagedara	Chandrasiri Ganegoda
Best Director	Mahagedara	Tissa Abeysekara
Best Actor	Malata Noena Bambaru	Joe Abeywickrama
Best Actress	Yasa Isuru	Malani Fonseka
Best Supporting Actor	Yasa Isuru	Amarasiri Kalansuriya
Best Supporting Actress	Mihidum Sihina	Denawaka Hamine
Best Upcoming Actress	Yasa Isuru	Gothami Pathiraja
Best Script Writer	Yahalu Yeheli	Karunasena Jayalath
Best Cinematographer (black n' white)	Mahagedara	Roland Perera
Best Cinematographer (color)	Yasa Isuru	K. D. Dayananda
Best Editor	Yahalu Yeheli	Lal Piyasena
Best Art Direction	Yahalu Yeheli	Hemapala Dharmasena
Best Makeup Artist	Yahalu Yeheli	Ebert Wijesinghe
Best Sound Effects	Yahalu Yeheli	Michael Sathyanathan
Best Music Direction	Mahagedara	Sarath Fernando
Best Lyricist	Yasa Isuru	Dharmasiri Gamage
Best Male Playback Singer	Mihidum Sihina	H. R. Jothipala
Best Female Playback Singer	Yasa Isuru	Nanda Malini
Most Popular Film	People's vote	Yasa Isuru
Most Popular Actor	People's vote	Vijaya Kumaratunga
Most Popular Actress	People's vote	Malani Fonseka
Most Popular Upcoming Actress	People's vote	Sabeetha Perera
Merit Awards	Mahagedara	Vijaya Kumaratunga
Merit Awards	Yahalu Yeheli	Tony Ranasinghe
Merit Awards	Mahagedara	Sriyani Amarasena
Merit Awards	Kadawunu Poronduwa remake	Sumana Amarasinghe
Merit Awards	Kadawunu Poronduwa remake	Malka Lochi
Merit Awards	Mihidum Sihina	Sarath Dassanayake

Category	Film
Popular Awards from Reader Vote	Yasa Isuru
Popular Awards from Reader Vote	Yahalu Yeheli
Popular Awards from Reader Vote	Mahagedara
Popular Awards from Reader Vote	Sakvithi Suwaya
Popular Awards from Reader Vote	Kadawunu Poronduwa remake
Popular Awards from Reader Vote	Malata Noena Bambaru
Popular Awards from Reader Vote	Mihidum Sihina
