= 14th Sarasaviya Awards =

1986 awards festival for Sinhala cinema

- Date: July 19, 1986
- Site: Bandaranaike Memorial International Conference Hall, Colombo 07, Sri Lanka
- Directed by: Granville Silva

Highlights
- Best Picture: Suddilage Kathaawa
- Most awards: Suddilage Kathaawa (7)
- Most nominations: Suddilage Kathaawa

Television coverage
- Network: Associated Newspapers of Ceylon Limited

The 14th Sarasaviya Awards festival (Sinhala: 14වැනි සරසවිය සම්මාන උලෙළ), presented by the Associated Newspapers of Ceylon Limited, was held to honor the best films of 1985 Sinhala cinema on July 19, 1986, at the Bandaranaike Memorial International Conference Hall, Colombo 07, Sri Lanka. Srimani Athulathmudali was the chief guest at the awards night.

The film Suddilage Kathaawa won the most awards with seven including Best Film.

== Awards ==
Category	Film	Recipient
Best Film	Suddilage Kathaawa	Bandula Gunawardane
Best Director	Suddilage Kathaawa	Dharmasiri Bandaranayake
Best Actor	Yuganthaya	Gamini Fonseka
Best Actress	Suddilage Kathaawa	Swarna Mallawarachchi
Best Supporting Actress	Obata Diwura Kiyannam	Sonia Disa
Best Emerging Actress		Inoka Amarasena
Best Script Writer	Suddilage Kathaawa	Simon Navagattegama
Best Cinematographer (black n' white film)	Wathsala Akka	Lal Wickramarachchi
Best Cinematographer (color film)	Sura Duthiyo	Suminda Weerasinghe
Best Editor	Yuganthaya	Gladwin Fernando
Best Art Direction	Suddilage Kathaawa	Granville Rodrigo
Best Makeup Artist	Suddilage Kathaawa	Ranjith Manthagaweera
Best Sound Effects	Suddilage Kathaawa	K. G. K. Balasingham
Best Music Direction	Yuganthaya	Premasiri Khemadasa
Best Lyricist	Obata Diwura Kiyannam	Ajantha Ranasinghe
Best Male Playback Singer	Obata Diwura Kiyannam	H. R. Jothipala
Best Female Playback Singer	Wathsala Akka	Malani Bulathsinhala
Most Popular Film	Wada Barinam Wadak Na	Christy Fernando; Mathew Fernando
Most Popular Actor	People's vote	Vijaya Kumaratunga
Most Popular Actress	People's vote	Malani Fonseka
Special Award	People's vote	Rukmani Devi
Rana Thisara Award	contribution to Sinhala cinema	Gamini Fonseka
Rana Thisara Award	contribution to Sinhala cinema	Joe Abeywickrama
Merit Awards	Mihidum Salu	Anoja Weerasinghe
Merit Awards	Sura Duthiyo	Robin Fernando
Merit Awards	Mihidum Salu	Sriyani Amarasena
Merit Awards	Adara Kathawa	Menik Kurukulasuriya

Category	Film
Popular Awards from Reader Vote
Popular Awards from Reader Vote	Obata Diwura Kiyannam
Popular Awards from Reader Vote	Sura Duthiyo
Popular Awards from Reader Vote	Suddilage Kathaawa
Popular Awards from Reader Vote	Yuganthaya
Popular Awards from Reader Vote	Wathsala Akka
Popular Awards from Reader Vote	Adara Kathawa
Popular Awards from Reader Vote	Araliya Mal
