= 23rd Sarasaviya Awards =

1995 awards festival for Sinhala cinema

- Date: August 12, 1995
- Site: Bandaranaike Memorial International Conference Hall, Colombo 07, Sri Lanka
- Directed by: Tilakaratne Kuruwita Bandara

Highlights
- Best Picture: Nomiyena Minisun
- Most awards: Nomiyena Minisun (6)
- Most nominations: Nomiyena Minisun

Television coverage
- Network: Associated Newspapers of Ceylon Limited

The 23rd Sarasaviya Awards festival (Sinhala: 23වැනි සරසවිය සම්මාන උලෙළ), presented by the Associated Newspapers of Ceylon Limited, was held to honor the best films of 1994 Sinhala cinema on August 12, 1995, at the Bandaranaike Memorial International Conference Hall, Colombo 07, Sri Lanka. Her Excellency The President Chandrika Kumaratunga was the chief guest at the awards night.

The film Nomiyena Minisun won the six prestigious awards including Best Film.

== Awards ==
Category	Film	Recipient
Best Film	Nomiyena Minisun	Bernard Gunasekara
Best Director	Nomiyena Minisun	Gamini Fonseka
Best Actor	Mee Haraka	Linton Semage
Best Actress	Pawana Ralu Viya	Iranganie Serasinghe
Best Supporting Actor	Nomiyena Minisun	Shantha Saparamadu
Best Supporting Actress	Pawana Ralu Viya	Kumudumalee de Silva
Best Emerging Actor	Ekada Wahi	Damith Fonseka
Best Emerging Actress	Handana Kinkini	Anusha Sonali
Best Script Writer	Pawana Ralu Viya	Ranjith Kuruppu
Best Cinematographer (color film)	Ekada Wahi	G. Nandasena
Best Cinematographer (black n' white film)	Ahas Maliga	Sumitta Amarasinghe
Best Editor	Ekada Vahi	Nishantha Pradeep
Best Art Direction	Nomiyena Minisun	Sena Maimbulage
Best Sound Effects	Nomiyena Minisun	Lionel Gunaratne
Best Music Direction	Ekada Wahi	Somapala Rathnayake
Best Lyricist	Ambu Samiyo	Sunil Ariyaratne
Best Male Playback Singer	Ahas Maliga	W. D. Amaradeva
Best Female Playback Singer	Ambu Samiyo	Nanda Malini
Most Popular Film	Nomiyena Minisun	Gamini Fonseka
Rana Thisara Award	contribution to Sinhala cinema	Titus Thotawatte
Rana Thisara Award	contribution to Sinhala cinema	Ruby de Mel
Merit Awards	Aathma	Roy de Silva
Merit Awards	Sudu Piruwata	Sumana Amarasinghe
Merit Awards	Ekada Wahi	Ananda Wickramage
Merit Awards	Raja Daruwo	Somapala Rathnayake
Merit Awards	Sandamadala	Kusala B. Perera

Category	Film
Popular films included in the festival
Popular films included in the festival	Nomiyena Minisun
Popular films included in the festival	Yuwathipathi
Popular films included in the festival	Mee Haraka
Popular films included in the festival	Sujatha
Popular films included in the festival	Love 94
Popular films included in the festival	Hello My Darling
Popular films included in the festival	Rajawansen Ekek
