= 18th Sarasaviya Awards =

1989 awards festival for Sinhala cinema

- Date: August 25, 1989
- Site: Bandaranaike Memorial International Conference Hall, Colombo 07, Sri Lanka
- Directed by: A. D. Ranjith Kumara

Highlights
- Best Picture: Siri Medura
- Most awards: Siri Medura (8)
- Most nominations: Siri Medura

Television coverage
- Network: Associated Newspapers of Ceylon Limited

The 18th Sarasaviya Awards festival (Sinhala: 18වැනි සරසවිය සම්මාන උලෙළ), presented by the Associated Newspapers of Ceylon Limited, was held to honor the best films of 1988 Sinhala cinema on August 25, 1989, at the Bandaranaike Memorial International Conference Hall, Colombo 07, Sri Lanka. President Ranasinghe Premadasa was the chief guest at the awards night.

The film Siri Medura won the most awards with eight including Best Film.

== Awards ==
Category	Film	Recipient
Best Film	Siri Medura	Bandula Gunawardena
Best Director	Siri Medura	Parakrama Niriella
Best Actor	Siri Medura	Ravindra Randeniya
Best Actress	Siri Medura	Anoja Weerasinghe
Best Supporting Actor	Kedapathaka Chaya	Sanath Gunathilake
Best Supporting Actress	Kedapathaka Chaya	Sunethra Sarathchandra
Best Emerging Actor	People's vote	Lucky Dias
Best Emerging Actress	People's vote	Sanoja Bibile
Best Script Writer	Kedapathaka Chaya	Wasantha Obesekere
Best Cinematographer (color film)	Siri Medura	Andrew Jayamanne
Best Editor	Kedapathaka Chaya	Stanley de Alwis
Best Art Direction	Randenigala Sinhaya	Lionel Silva
Best Makeup Artist	Kedapathaka Chaya	Ranjith Manthagaweera
Best Sound Effects	Kedapathaka Chaya	George Manatunga
Best Music Direction	Siri Medura	Premasiri Khemadasa
Best Lyricist	Siri Medura	Lucien Bulathsinhala
Best Male Playback Singer	Siri Medura	Amarasiri Peiris
Best Female Playback Singer	Sinasenna Raththaran	Chandrika Siriwardena
Most Popular Film	Nommara 17	Preethiraj Weeraratne
Most Popular Actor	People's vote	Jeevan Kumaratunga
Most Popular Actress	People's vote	Sabeetha Perera
Rana Thisara Award	contribution to Sinhala cinema	D. B. Nihalsinghe
Rana Thisara Award	contribution to Sinhala cinema	Swarna Mallawarachchi
Merit Awards	Sinasenna Raththaran	Aruna Shanthi
Merit Awards	Randenigala Sinhaya	Lionel Deraniyagala
Merit Awards	Film song recording	Mervyn Bens

Category	Film
Popular films included in the festival
Popular films included in the festival	Nommara 17
Popular films included in the festival	Mamai Raja
Popular films included in the festival	Kedapathaka Chaya
Popular films included in the festival	Sinasenna Raththaran
Popular films included in the festival	Siri Medura
Popular films included in the festival	Okkoma Rajawaru
Popular films included in the festival	Randenigala Sinhaya
