= 8th Sarasaviya Awards =

1980 awards festival for Sinhala cinema

- Date: March 29, 1980
- Site: Colombo New Theater Grounds, Sri Lanka

Highlights
- Best Picture: Handaya
- Most awards: Handaya (7)
- Most nominations: Handaya

Television coverage
- Network: Associated Newspapers of Ceylon Limited

The 8th Sarasaviya Awards festival (Sinhala: 8වැනි සරසවිය සම්මාන උලෙළ), presented by the Associated Newspapers of Ceylon Limited, was held to honor the best films of 1979 Sinhala cinema on March 29, 1980, at the Colombo New Theater Grounds, Sri Lanka. It was held after ten years gap due to the political unrest prevailed in the country. Minister of Lands, Land Development and Mahaweli Development Gamini Dissanayake was the chief guest at the awards night.

The film Handaya won the most awards with seven including Best Film.

== Awards ==
Category	Film	Recipient
Best Film	Handaya	Titus Thotawatte
Best Director	Handaya	Titus Thotawatte
Best Actor	Sarungale	Gamini Fonseka
Best Actress	Hingana Kolla	Malani Fonseka
Best Supporting Actor	Handaya	Henry Jayasena
Best Supporting Actress	Sarungale	Farina Lai
Best Script Writer	Handaya	Titus Thotawatte
Best Cinematographer	Handaya	Andrew Jayamanne
Best Editor	Handaya	Titus Thotawatte
Best Sound Effects	Palagetiyo	George Manatunga
Best Music Direction	Palagetiyo	D. R. Pieris
Best Lyricist	Handaya	Arisen Ahubudu
Best Male Playback Singer	Muwan Palessa	W. D. Amaradeva
Best Female Playback Singer	Monarathenna	Nanda Malini
Most Popular Actor	People's vote	Gamini Fonseka
Most Popular Actress	People's vote	Malani Fonseka

Category	Film
Popular Awards from Reader Vote
Popular Awards from Reader Vote	Muwan Palessa
Popular Awards from Reader Vote	Nuwan Renu
Popular Awards from Reader Vote	Monarathenna
Popular Awards from Reader Vote	Hingana Kolla
Popular Awards from Reader Vote	Sarungale
Popular Awards from Reader Vote	Handaya
Popular Awards from Reader Vote	Palagetiyo
