= 25th Sarasaviya Awards =

1998 awards festival for Sinhala cinema

- Date: April 2, 1998
- Site: Bandaranaike Memorial International Conference Hall, Colombo 07, Sri Lanka
- Directed by: Tilakaratne Kuruwita Bandara

Highlights
- Best Picture: Loku Duwa
- Most awards: Loku Duwa (7)
- Most nominations: Loku Duwa

Television coverage
- Network: Associated Newspapers of Ceylon Limited

The 25th Sarasaviya Awards festival (Sinhala: 25වැනි සරසවිය සම්මාන උලෙළ), presented by the Associated Newspapers of Ceylon Limited, was held to honor the best films of 1996 Sinhala cinema on April 2, 1998, at the Bandaranaike Memorial International Conference Hall, Colombo 07, Sri Lanka. Minister C. V. Gunaratne was the chief guest at the awards night.

The film Loku Duwa won the seven prestigious awards including Best Film.

== Awards ==
Category	Film	Recipient
Best Film	Loku Duwa	Geetha Kumarasinghe
Best Director	Loku Duwa	Sumitra Peries
Best Script Writer	Bithu Sithuvam	K. D. Nicholas
Best Actor	Bithu Sithuvam	Joe Abeywickrama
Best Actress	Bithu Sithuvam	Dilani Abeywardana
Best Supporting Actor	Loku Duwa	Kamal Addararachchi
Best Supporting Actress	Loku Duwa	Iranganie Serasinghe
Best Cinematographer (black n' white film)	Sebe Mithura	Lalith Gunawardena
Best Cinematographer (color film)	Loku Duwa	William Blake
Best Editor	Sihina Deshayen	Stanley de Alwis
Best Music Direction	Sihina Deshayen	Ernie Peiris; Boodee Keerthisena
Best Art Direction	Sihina Deshayen	Mahinda Abeysekera; Mahendra Perera; Boodee Keerthisena
Best Sound Effects	Sihina Deshayen	Arun Bose
Best Makeup	Sihina Deshayen	Vasantha Vittachchi
Best Lyricist	Bithu Sithuvam	Sunil Ariyaratne
Best Male Playback Singer	Bithu Sithuvam	Gunadasa Kapuge
Best Female Playback Singer	Amanthaya	Nipunika Jagoda
Most Popular Film	Loku Duwa	People's vote
Best Upcoming Actor	Sihina Deshayen	Roger Seneviratne
Best Upcoming Actress	Soora Daruwo	Judy de Silva
Special Jury Award	Sihina Deshayen	Boodee Keerthisena
Rana Thisara Award	contribution to Sinhala cinema	W. A. B. de Silva
Rana Thisara Award	contribution to Sinhala cinema	Clarice de Silva
Merit Awards	Soora Daruwo	Manike Attanayake
Merit Awards	Loku Duwa	Ama Wijesekara
Merit Awards	Amanthaya	Douglas Ranasinghe
Merit Awards	Mana Mohini	Freddie Silva
Merit Awards	Mana Mohini	Kalawathie
Merit Awards	Amanthaya	Nihal Fernando

Category	Film
Popular films included in the festival	Loku Duwa
Popular films included in the festival	Thunweni Aehe
Popular films included in the festival	Sihina Deshayen
Popular films included in the festival	Cheriyo Darling
Popular films included in the festival	Api Baya Naha
Popular films included in the festival	Mana Mohini
Popular films included in the festival	Bithu Sithuvam

Category	Film
Worship Pooja Special Awards for Cinema Career	Michael Sannas Liyanage
Worship Pooja Special Awards for Cinema Career	D. T. Fernando
Worship Pooja Special Awards for Cinema Career	Premanath Moraes
Worship Pooja Special Awards for Cinema Career	Mabel Blythe
Worship Pooja Special Awards for Cinema Career	Leticia Peiris
Worship Pooja Special Awards for Cinema Career	Florida Jayalath
Worship Pooja Special Awards for Cinema Career	Sumith Bibile
Worship Pooja Special Awards for Cinema Career	Harun Lanthra
Worship Pooja Special Awards for Cinema Career	Stanley Perera
Worship Pooja Special Awards for Cinema Career	Rita Ratnayake
Worship Pooja Special Awards for Cinema Career	Millie Kahandawala
Worship Pooja Special Awards for Cinema Career	Girley Gunawardana
Worship Pooja Special Awards for Cinema Career	Udula Dabare
Worship Pooja Special Awards for Cinema Career	Christy Leonard Perera
Worship Pooja Special Awards for Cinema Career	Shesha Palihakkara
Worship Pooja Special Awards for Cinema Career	Vincent Vaas
Worship Pooja Special Awards for Cinema Career	Kanthi Gunatunga
Worship Pooja Special Awards for Cinema Career	Ananda Weerakoon
Worship Pooja Special Awards for Cinema Career	Baptist Fernando
Worship Pooja Special Awards for Cinema Career	Tissa Nagodawithana
