= 3rd Sarasaviya Awards =

1966 awards festival for Sinhala cinema

- Date: August 20, 1966
- Site: Colombo Race Course, Sri Lanka
- Directed by: Granville Silva

Highlights
- Best Picture: Saaravita
- Most awards: Saaravita (9)
- Most nominations: Saaravita

Television coverage
- Network: Associated Newspapers of Ceylon Limited

The 3rd Sarasaviya Awards festival (Sinhala: 3වැනි සරසවිය සම්මාන උලෙළ), presented by the Associated Newspapers of Ceylon Limited, was held to honor the best films of 1965 Sinhala cinema on August 20, 1966, at the Colombo Race Course, Sri Lanka. For the first time in Sri Lankan award history, Bollywood celebrities Hindi actresses Nutan and Shashikala, then editors of Filmfare magazine B. J. K. Karanjia and Hindi actor Sunil Dutt were invited to participate as the chief guests at the awards night.

The film Saaravita won the most awards with nine including Best Film.

== Awards ==
Category	Film	Recipient
Best Film	Saaravita	Shesha Palihakkara
Best Director	Saaravita	Tissa Liyanasuriya
Best Actor	Saaravita	Joe Abeywickrama
Best Actress		Not Awarded
Best Script Writer	Saaravita	K. A. W. Perera
Best Cinematographer	Saaravita	W. A. Ratnayake
Best Editor	Saaravita	Titus Thotawatte
Best Music Direction	Handapana	Sisira Senaratne
Best Lyricist	Saaravita	Mahagama Sekara
Best Male Playback Singer	Allapu Gedara	Mohideen Baig
Best Female Playback Singer	Saaravita	Nanda Malini
Merit Awards	Saama	G. D. L. Perera

Category	Film	Recipient
Most Popular Actor	People's vote	Gamini Fonseka
Most Popular Actress	People's vote	Jeevarani Kurukulasuriya
Most Popular Supportive Actor	People's vote	Dommie Jayawardena
Most Popular Supportive Actress	People's vote	Sandhya Kumari
Favorite actor character	Saaravita	Joe Abeywickrama
Favorite actress character	Handapana	Vijitha Mallika
Favorite film story	Handapana	W. A. Silva
Favorite music director	People's vote	W. D. Amaradeva
Favorite lyricist	People's vote	Karunaratne Abeysekera
Favorite singer	People's vote	Milton Perera
Favorite songstress	People's vote	Rukmani Devi

Category	Film
Popular Films from Reader Vote
Popular Films from Reader Vote	Allapu Gedara
Popular Films from Reader Vote	Chandiya
Popular Films from Reader Vote	Handapana
Popular Films from Reader Vote	Sadol Kandulu
Popular Films from Reader Vote	Saaravita
Popular Films from Reader Vote	Yatagiya Davasa
