= 4th Sarasaviya Awards =

1967 awards festival for Sinhala cinema

- Date: July 5, 1967
- Site: Regal Cinema, Colombo, Sri Lanka
- Directed by: Granville Silva

Highlights
- Best Picture: Delovak Athara
- Most awards: Delovak Athara (3)
- Most nominations: Delovak Athara

Television coverage
- Network: Associated Newspapers of Ceylon Limited

The 5th Sarasaviya Awards festival (Sinhala: 5වැනි සරසවිය සම්මාන උලෙළ), presented by the Associated Newspapers of Ceylon Limited, was held to honor the best films of 1966 Sinhala cinema on July 5, 1967, at the Regal Cinema, Colombo, Sri Lanka. Honorable Minister of State J. R. Jayewardene and lady Elina Jayewardene were the chief guests at the awards night.

The film Delovak Athara received most nominations and awards at the ceremony.

== Awards ==
Category	Film	Recipient
Best Film	Senasuma Kothanada	Somasiri Perera
Best Director	Delovak Athara	Lester James Peries
Best Actor	Parasathu Mal	Gamini Fonseka
Best Actress	Oba Dutu Da	Iranganie Serasinghe
Best Script Writer	Parasathu Mal	P. K. D. Seneviratne
Best Cinematographer	Delovak Athara	William Blake
Best Editor	Delovak Athara	Sumitra Peries
Best Lyricist	Maha Re Hamuwu Sthriya	Karunaratne Abeysekera
Best Male Playback Singer	Senasuma Kothanada	W. D. Amaradeva
Best Female Playback Singer	Parasathu Mal	Sujatha Aththanayaka
Most Popular Actor	People's vote	Gamini Fonseka
Most Popular Actress	People's vote	Jeevarani Kurukulasuriya
Merit Awards		Tony Ranasinghe
Merit Awards		Sandhya Kumari
Merit Awards		Jeevarani Kurukulasuriya

Category	Film
Popular Awards from Reader Vote
Popular Awards from Reader Vote	Delovak Athara
Popular Awards from Reader Vote	Oba Dutu Da
Popular Awards from Reader Vote	Parasathu Mal
Popular Awards from Reader Vote	Sadol Kandulu
Popular Awards from Reader Vote	Sampatha
Popular Awards from Reader Vote	Senasuma Kothanada
