= Ganga Addara =

- Directed by: Sumitra Peiris
- Written by: Tissa Abeysekara
- Based on: Ganga Addara by Letitia Botejue
- Produced by: Sumathi Films
- Starring: Henry Jayasena; Vijaya Kumaratunga; Vasanthi Chathurani
- Cinematography: Donald Karunaratna
- Edited by: Lal Piyasena
- Music by: Nimal Mendis
- Release date: 1980
- Country: Sri Lanka
- Language: Sinhala

Ganga Addara (English : Beside the River) was a 1980 Sinhalese language film directed by Sumitra Peiris and produced by Sumathi Films. The film stars Vasanthi Chathurani and late Vijaya Kumaratunga in the lead roles. Adapted from a novel by Letitia Botejue, its script was written by veteran director Tissa Abeysekara. The music and English lyrics ('Banks of the River') were composed by Nimal Mendis. It was translated into Sinhala by Augustus Vinayagaratnam and was sung by Vijaya Kumaratunga, who also made his mark as a playback singer. Ganga Addara, which was the second production of Sumathi Films was set in Kandy, colonial Sri Lanka. Its plot is about a tragic love story between a boy and his uncle's daughter, where all the incidents take place around river Kalani, a famous river in Sri Lanka.

It received many awards at the prestigious Sarasaviya Awards Festival including the Best Film Award, Best Director Award, Best Music Direction Award and Best Actress Award for Vasanthi Chathurani. Even after two decades, the film, which was a box-office hit in the eighties, still remains as one of the finest Sri Lankan films ever made.

== Synopsis ==
England educated Dr. Sarath Pathirana (Vijaya Kumaratunga), who is willing to try out new methods to treat his patients, is directed towards a special patient by the Head Doctor (Henry Jayasena) at the mental hospital. This patient is a beautiful girl named Nirmala (Vasanthi Chathurani), who does not speak a single word nor trouble anyone excessively unlike any other patient at the hospital.

In order to cure her, Dr. Pathirana seeks help from her father, a proud, rich man called D.J. Atapattu (Tony Ranasinghe) and the patient herself. He is certain that he can restore her to normal, if he can find out the causes for the sudden change in her mental makeup.

Through the several characters in the story, it is revealed that Nirmala was in love with her cousin, Ranjith (Sanath Gunathilake). He was an educated youth, but not a financially able one like Nirmala's family and so her father refused their marriage. Instead, she was married to the son of the rich, dignitary Kobbekaduwa family from Kandy. After six months of their wedding, she becomes pregnant and is about to leave to her parents' home, when a white lady with two children arrive at their home. The two children are seen calling her husband, "Daddy." As soon as Nirmala is aware of the fact that Kobbekaduwa was married with two children in England, she poisons herself and is taken to hospital.

It is this incident that had changed Nirmala's life as well as her mental condition. She had not spoken a word since then. Yet, through Dr. Pathirana's kindness, she begins to gradually heal, when her forehead is hurt by another patient at the hospital. This accelerates Nirmala's recovery and she regains her lost memory. But, by that time, Dr. Pathirana has fallen in love with her.

Her parents are now ready to tie their daughter's knot with Ranjith, who has returned from England after his higher studies. But, Ranjith's parents have already agreed on another girl. On the other hand, Dr. Pathirana is also ready to accept Nirmala's hand, although she does not remember a bit of the history with him at the hospital now.

At the end, she goes back to the place near the river, where she spent her childhood with Ranjith and she extends her hand to who she fantasizes as being him in a boat approaching the bridge, when she falls into the river and presumably drowns.

== Cast ==
- Vijaya Kumaratunga as Doctor Sarath Pathirana
- Vasanthi Chathurani as Nirmala Atapattu
- Tony Ranasinghe as Don Juwanis Atapattu
- Henry Jayasena as Head Doctor
- Geetha Kumarasinghe as Mad woman Miss. de Soysa
- Sanath Gunathilake as Ranjith
- Shanthi Lekha as Servant Mrs. Bunna
- Leena de Silva as Mrs. Atapattu
- Edmund Jayasinghe as Nirmala's husband
- Jeewan Kumaranatunga

== Teledrama Remake (2010) ==
In 2010 a new teledrama in the same name started telecasting on Sirasa TV. The plot is identical to that of original film at many scenes. This teledrama stars Saranga Disasekara, Shalani Tharaka and Devnaka Porage. Also a new version of original movie's Ganga Addara song was produced for this teledrama by the original composer Nimal Mendis. This new version is sung by Surendra Perera.
