= 36th Sarasaviya Awards =

2025 awards festival for Sinhala cinema

- Date: June 24, 2025
- Site: Bandaranaike Memorial International Conference Hall, Colombo, Sri Lanka
- Hosted by: Saman Athahudahetti

Highlights
- Best Picture: Sinhabahu
- Best Director: Udayakantha Warnasuriya

Television coverage
- Network: Associated Newspapers of Ceylon Limited

The 36th Sarasaviya Awards festival (Sinhala: 36වැනි සරසවිය සම්මාන උලෙළ), presented by the Associated Newspapers of Ceylon Limited, to honor the best films of 2024 Sinhala cinema, held on June 24, 2025, at the BMICH, Colombo. The ceremony was hosted by Saman Atahdudahett.

The next edition, the 37th Sarasaviya Awards, was held in 2026.

== Awards for films released in 2024 ==
The section contains categories of Awards received for films released in 2024.

- Best Film: Sinhabahu Producers: Renuka Balasuriya & Gamini Wickramasinghe
- Best Director: Udayakantha Warnasuriya :Gini :Avi Saha Gini Keli 2
- Best Actor: Danuka Dilshan: Manju : Gini Avi Saha Gini Keli 2
- Best Actress: Thilakshani Rathnayake Rathi : Doosra
- Best Screenplay: Sumithra Rahubadda Minnu
- Best Supporting Actor: Sajitha Anuththara Sinhabahu : Sinhabahu
- Best Supporting Actress: Thisari Wathsala : Purnima : Minnu
- Best Visual Effects: Raveen Wettasinghe [[Sinhabahu
- Best Costume Design: Oshini Ramesha Sinhabahu]]
- Best Choreography/Art Direction:Supun Abeysinghe Solo (Ranga Vinyasaya / Set Design)
- Best Villain: (Pratiweera Rangnaya) Ashan Dias Derrick ‚ 1970 Love Story
- Best Comedian: (Haasyothpadaka Rangnaya) Mahendra Perera Director ‚ 1970 Love Story
- Best Cinematography: Ayeshmantha Hettiarachchi; Vishva Balasuriya: Gini Avi Saha Gini Keli 2; Minnu & Sinhabahu (tie)
- Best Editing: Ruwan Chamara Ranasinghe : Gini Avi Saha Gini Keli 2
- Best Makeup: Vidura Abeydeera : Sinhabahu
- Best Art Direction: Janaka Prasad : Sinhabahu
- Best Sound: Sasika Ruwan Marasinghe :My Red Comrade
- Best Music Direction: Saman Panapitiya: Sinhabahu
- Best Lyricist: Nuwan Jude Liyanage ‚ÄúIpala Rikili Sulan‚ Guru Geethaya
- Best Female Vocalist: Nuwandika Senarathna: Giri Sirasa Wasa Athi‚ Sinhabahu
- Best Male Vocalist: Kithsiri Jayasekara ‚pala Rikili Sulan‚ Guru Geethaya
- Most Attractive/Popular Film: Mandara Priyantha Kolombage
- Best Emerging Actor: Megha Sooriyaarachchi Mandara
- Best Emerging Actress: Abhilashi Shanthushki Sinhabahu (Young Suppa Devi)
- Best Tamil-language Film (2024): Director: Ranjith Joseph
- Jury Special Award: Solo Town Chathurangana de Silva (Music)
- Jury Special Award: Rocket School community of Seewali Central College Ratnapura
- Merit Award: Sri Saddha Ritigala Sumedha (Stunt Direction)
- Merit Award: Sihina Sameekarana ‚Kasuni Kawindi (Acting, Ridmi)
- Merit Award: Solo Town ‚Yulan Drew (Acting)
- Merit Award: Mandara ‚ Saheli Sadithma (Acting, Yashodhara)
- Merit Award: Ooli (Tamil) Arunachalam Sivalingam (Editing)
- Merit Award: Ooli (Tamil) Rajesh Verma (Cinematography)
- Merit Award: Ooli (Tamil) Ranjith Joseph / Dee Paselvam (Screenplay)
- Popular Actor: Megha Sooriyaarachchi
- Popular Actress: Dinakshie Priyasad
- Ranathisara Award, Dr. Lester James Peries Memorial Award
