= Karma (2012 film) =

- Film poster
- Sinhala: කර්ම
- Directed by: Prasanna Jayakody
- Written by: Prasanna Jayakody; Jagath Manuwarna
- Produced by: Ceylon Theater Pvt. Ltd; Sky Entertainers Pvt. Ltd; Magic Lantern Pvt. Ltd
- Starring: Nadeeka Guruge; Michelle Herft; Jagath Manuwarna
- Cinematography: Palitha Perera
- Edited by: Bathiya Dunusinghe; Sudesh Kumarasinghe; Rangana Sinharage
- Music by: Nadeeka Guruge; Sumudu Guruge
- Production company: Endless World
- Distributed by: CEL theaters
- Release date: August 2012
- Running time: 140 minutes
- Country: Sri Lanka
- Language: Sinhala

Karma (Sinhala: කර්ම) is a 2012 Sri Lankan Sinhala adult drama film directed by Prasanna Jayakody and co-produced by Ceylon Theater Pvt. Ltd, Sky Entertainers Pvt. Ltd and Magic Lantern Pvt. Ltd. It stars popular musician Nadeeka Guruge in his debut role in cinema and Michelle Herft in lead roles along with Jagath Manuwarna. Music co-composed by Nadeeka Guruge himself with Sumudu Guruge. It is the 1168th Sri Lankan film in the Sinhala cinema.

== Plot ==
Piyal (Jagath) is a youth who dedicates his time to drama, living alone. He has a feeling of guilty for not saving his mother from death. On the other side of the walls of his place, lives a couple: Amanda (Michelle) and Nadee (Nadeeka). Nadee, is Amanda's inattentive lover tells her to abort her child on both times she was to become pregnant. Amanda also has cancer. Piyal feels curious about Amanda who is older than him and later on it turns into a sexual attraction. However it turns into empathy. As a result, Piyal starts to take care and treat Nadee as her mother to get away from his guilty feeling about his mother's death. Meanwhile, Nadee appears to embrace the guilty feeling that he did not care for his girl friend. Concentrating on the dualities of life, the movie takes the viewer through emotional turbulence.

== Cast ==
- Nadeeka Guruge as Nadee
- Michelle Herft as Amanda
- Jagath Manuwarna as Piyal
- Avanthi Dilrukshika
- Nadeesha Yapage
- Buddhika Mahesh
- Eric Madanayake
- Lelum Rathnayake
- Priyantha Rathnayake

== Song ==
No.	Title	Lyrics	Singer(s)	Length
1.	"Amlakara Wayuwa"	Jayaruwan Bandara	Nadeeka Guruge, Natasha Rathnayake

== International participation ==
- Pusan International Film Festival in South Korea
- São Paulo International Film Festival in Brazil
- Rotterdam International Film Festival in the Netherlands
- Chicago International Film Festival
- Bildrausch International Film Festival in Switzerland
- Marrakech International Film Festival in Morocco
- Isolacinema International Film Festival in Slovenia

== Awards ==
- 2013 Derana Lux Film Festival Award for the Best Sounds - Lionel Gunaratne and Sasika Ruwan
