= Nadeeka Guruge =

Sri Lankan composer, musician, and academic

Nadeeka Guruge නදීක ගුරුගේ
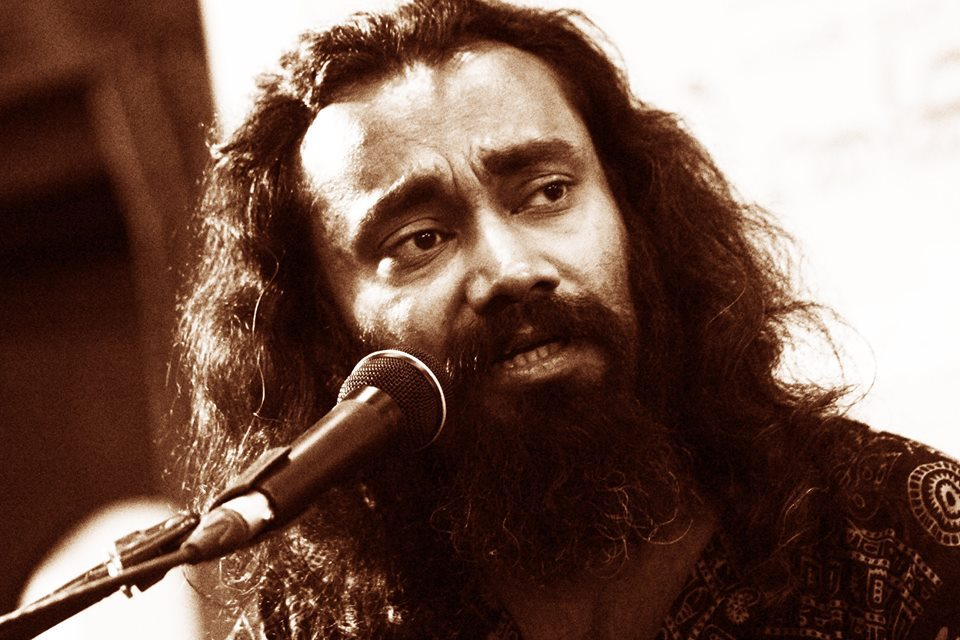

Background information
- Born: 27 September 1976 (age 49); Anuradhapura, Sri Lanka
- Origin: Nuwara Eliya, Sri Lanka
- Genres: Folk music; Film music; Classical
- Occupations: Composer; Musician; Educator
- Years active: 1999–present
- Spouse: Manori Mallikarachchi
- Website: nadeekaguruge.com

Nadeeka Guruge (Sinhala: නදීක ගුරුගේ; born 27 September 1976) is a Sri Lankan composer, musician, and music educator. He is best known for his work in film and theatre music. Guruge has received multiple awards for his contributions to music direction and background music. He served as the inaugural dean of the School of Music at the Sri Lanka Technological Campus (SLTC). He is also known for his onstage concert performances and public engagement in music education and research.

== Early life and education ==
Guruge was born in Anuradhapura and raised in Nuwara Eliya, Sri Lanka. He began learning guitar at the age of 14 and was initially taught by his brother. He was influenced by composer Premasiri Khemadasa, whose work shaped his approach to Western classical and Sri Lankan folk music. Sunil Santha and Clarence Wijewardena were major influences on his musical outlook, while Johann Sebastian Bach shaped his approach to film scoring and instrumental composition. Exposure to diverse musical traditions through travel and research influenced his interest in indigenous musical forms, which would become a central focus of his career.

== Career ==
Guruge began his professional career in 1999 with Sanyugma, a folk music collaboration with Bolivian musician Marcello Titto Li, blending traditional and contemporary styles. He directed music for numerous theatre productions, including Rathnawalli (2006) and Sanda Langa Maranaya (2005) and composed music for several notable Sri Lankan television dramas, such as Aga Pipi Mal (2004) and Kampitha Wil (2008). He transitioned into film scoring in the early 2000s.

In addition to his work in composition, he has served as a judge on the Sri Lankan reality television series Derana Dream Star, a popular music competition produced by TV Derana. He was part of the judging panel for Season IV in 2012, and returned for Season XI in 2023. The show, known for discovering new musical talent.

== Film scoring and acting ==
Guruge's first credited film composition was for his score in Sulanga Enu Pinisa (2005, also known as The Forsaken Land), which was screened at the Cannes Film Festival. For this film, he used a Native American quena flute, showcasing his innovative approach. He employed synthesizers in Sankara (2007) and drew on folk music influences for Abá (2008), noting similarities between Sri Lankan dirges and Mediterranean music. His score for Cinderella (2011) was considered among his best work. His musical approach often incorporates traditional instruments and experimental techniques.

In addition to composing, Guruge played the lead role in the film Karma (2012), which was screened at several international film festivals.

== Academic and educational contributions ==
Guruge founded the Megha Foundation in 1998, a Nuwara Eliya-based music research institute collaborating with Bolivian and Austrian partners. The foundation hosts monthly dialogues, performances, and educational programs for young artists.

From 2020 to 2024, Guruge served as the inaugural dean of Sri Lanka Technological Campus (SLTC)'s School of Music. He led the development of a Bachelor of Music (Honours) program that included both local and international music traditions. The program received approval from the University Grants Commission and the Ministry of Higher Education. Guruge has also contributed to music education through lectures.

Since 2024, Guruge has focused on informal education and research into 20th-century Sri Lankan music identity, Balangoda people’s musical behavior, and Vedda music, with findings to be published in future books.

Guruge has authored multiple published books and is preparing several others, including ක්ලැරන්සියානු පොප් සංගීතය, an analysis of Clarence Wijewardena's music, and ජෝති එනකං, a reflective and philosophical work that explores the cultural, social, and artistic symbolism of the figure H. R. Jothipala within Sri Lankan music and society. Mystique Maya a fiction novel submitted for the Gratiaen Prize.

== Concerts and performances ==
Guruge has been a prominent performer in Sri Lanka’s music scene, engaging in concerts, television, and other public appearances. He initiated the Nostal Guitar concert series, which began in 2013 at The Gramodaya Folk Art Centre in Battaramulla, showcasing his original guitar-based works. The series continued with performances on 10 April 2015 at Dharmaraja College Auditorium in Kandy and 11 April 2015 in Nuwara Eliya, featuring Kasun Kalhara and Indrachapa Liyanage. These concerts, inspired by Latin American and European formats, integrated the audience with the stage through lighting and storytelling, emphasizing Guruge’s lifelong connection to the guitar. The series extended into 2024, as promoted on his official website. In 2025, Guruge plans to hold a film music concert to celebrate 20 years in cinema, featuring award-winning compositions and possibly popular film songs.

In 2016 and 2017, Guruge performed in 4U, a romantic fusion music concert alongside Kasun Kalhara, Indrachapa Liyanage, and Nadeeka Jayawardana. The show, presented by Ahasa Media Works, featured popular love songs and ballads, with performances at Ave Maria Auditorium in Negombo (2016) and Nelum Pokuna Theatre in Colombo (2017).

In 2021, he appeared as a guest on Ma Nowana Mama, a TV Derana musical program hosted by Kelum Srimal, where he performed and discussed the meaning behind his favorite songs.

In 2022, Guruge joined Kalhara, Liyanage, and Jayawardana for Legends: Unfolding Youth Legacy, a concert showcasing Sri Lankan musical talent, highlighting their collective influence on Sinhala music (සිංහල සංගීතය).

== Artistic style and influence ==
Guruge's compositional work blends Sri Lankan folk music (සිංහල ජන සංගීතය) with Western classical traditions, often using traditional instruments in innovative ways. He composed and played guitar for Ameesha (අමීෂා), sung by Kithsiri Jayasekara, which introduced continuous lead guitar use with Latin American and flamenco influences, impacting Sri Lankan music. Similarly, he composed and performed guitar for Radical Premaya (රැඩිකල් ප්‍රේමය), sung by Kasun Kalhara, blending rock styles and further influencing the industry. He later shifted toward simpler compositions, such as Lelasiya (ලෙලැසිය), to reach broader audiences, acknowledging the complexity of earlier works like Romeo Bendala (රෝමියෝ බැඳලා) appealed to niche subcultures. His experimental performance of Sunil Santha's Varen Heen Saare with guitar accompaniment sparked renewed interest in Santha's work. Influenced by literary figures like Fyodor Dostoevsky, Martin Wickramasinghe, and Simon Nawagattegama, and musicians such as Premasiri Khemadasa, J.S. Bach, Clarence Wijewardena, and Sunil Santha, his compositions often explore social themes like inequality and cultural identity.

Guruge views Sri Lankan music as a fusion of global influences, including Mediterranean, Native American, and Asian traditions, reflecting the country's diverse heritage. He critiques the lack of a formal Sri Lankan musical culture since Sunil Santha's dismissal from radio, which marginalized local artists like Clarence Wijewardena, whom Guruge credits for popularizing the electric guitar. He emphasizes music as a tool for emotional and societal reflection, advocating for education to preserve Sinhala musical heritage. Guruge supports creative reinterpretation of songs (e.g., ballads to rock) but stresses ethical and legal protections for lyricists and composers, prioritizing their ownership over singers. His interest in Fyodor Dostoevsky's Crime and Punishment informs his exploration of social justice and class dynamics in his work.

== Political activities ==
Guruge has expressed political views through his artistic work and public advocacy. His 2007 song Luhu Bandinna Maa is a political folk composition addressing themes of resistance and collective memory, inspired by his time in Geneva. In 2019, he composed the score for Ginnen Upan Seethala, a film examining the JVP's second armed struggle and Rohana Wijeweera, exploring societal imbalances following Sri Lanka's 1977 economic liberalization.

Guruge has participated in various political events supporting the National People's Power (NPP) and its affiliate, the Janatha Vimukthi Peramuna (JVP). In 2018, he joined a media conference themed "A Village Free of Pollution" in Pitakotte, expressing support for progressive policies. That same year, he participated in "Artists for Political Ethics and Democracy," opposing what was characterized as unconstitutional political appointments.

In a 2019 interview, Guruge acknowledged receiving both criticism and appreciation from fans regarding his political stance, noting that his approach to music often addresses social concerns.

In 2020, he spoke at an NPP media conference promoting the party's candidates ahead of elections.

== Personal life ==
Guruge is married to Manori Mallikarachchi, a senior diplomat since 2003, serving as Acting Deputy High Commissioner of Sri Lanka in London since 2023. In October 2024, Mallikarachchi, serving as Deputy High Commissioner of Sri Lanka in London, led a two-member delegation to the Commonwealth Heads of Government Meeting (CHOGM) in Samoa. Her participation drew public attention, with some social media posts questioning her qualifications, though the Ministry of Foreign Affairs confirmed her 20-year diplomatic career and prior appointment to the role in 2023. The couple has two daughters: Tharani, studying for Advanced Level exams in Physics and playing drums and guitar, and Oditya, in Grade 8, playing piano and singing in a school opera in London. Guruge has an interest in agriculture, influenced by his father’s career, and considered it as an alternative profession.

== Awards and nominations ==
Nadeeka Guruge has received numerous awards and nominations for his contributions to Sri Lankan music, cinema, television, and cultural development.

Year	Award	Category	Work
2010	Sarasaviya Awards	Best Music Direction	Aba
2012	Derana Film Awards	Best Background Music	Vijaya Kuweni
2014	Raigam Tele'es Best Teledrama Singer Award	Best Teledrama Singer	Sihina Aran Enna
2014	Hiru Golden Film Awards	Best Background Music	Not specified
2016	Sarasaviya Awards	Best Music Direction	Maharaja Gemunu
2016	Presidential Awards	Best Music Director	Sakkarang
2017	Bunka Cultural Awards	Contribution to Arts	—
2019	Presidential Awards	Best Music Director	Ginnen Upan Seethala
2023	Sumathi Awards	Best Music Director	Sansararanya Asabada

== Selected works ==
=== Filmography ===
- Pura Handa Kaluwara (2001, composer) Pura Handa Kaluwara at IMDb
- Sansun Nosansun (2003, composer)
- Sulanga Enu Pinisa (2005, composer) The Forsaken Land at IMDb
- Sankara (2007, composer) Sankara at IMDb
- Abá (2008, composer) Abá at IMDb
- Ira Handa Yata (2010, composer) Ira Handa Yata at IMDb
- Cindrella (2011, composer) Cindrella at IMDb
- Gamani (2011, music department) Gamani at IMDb
- Karma (2012, composer and actor) Karma at IMDb
- Vijaya Kuweni (2012, composer) Vijaya Kuweni at IMDb
- Nikini Vassa (2013, composer)
- Maharaja Gemunu (2015, music department) Maharaja Gemunu at IMDb
- Patibhana (2016, composer) Patibhana at IMDb
- Sakkarang (2016, composer) Sakkarang at IMDb
- Swaroopa (2017, composer)
- Pani Makuluwo (2017, composer)
- Ginnen Upan Seethala (2019, composer) Ginnen Upan Seethala at IMDb
- Praana (2022, composer) Seeds at IMDb
- Dada Ima (2023, composer) Dada Ima at IMDb
- My Red Comrade (2024, music department) My Red Comrade at IMDb

=== Theatre productions ===
- Mal Nelanna Ba (1997)
- Gewan Naththan Bambu Gahannada (2001)
- Master Harrold (2003)
- Master Builder (2005)
- Sanda Langa Maranaya (2005)
- Rathnawalli (2006)

=== Teledramas ===
- Sinidu Piyaapath (2003)
- Aga Pipi Mal (2004)
- Ranga Soba (2005)
- Rasthiyadukaraya (2006)
- Kampitha Wil (2008)
- Ahi Pillamak Yata (2009)
- Sihina Aran Enna (2011)
- Dooli Pintharu (2013)
- Ranga Sobaa (2015)

=== Books ===
- H. R. Jothipala: Jothi Enakang (2022)
- Clarence Wijewardena: A Musical Analysis (2024)
- Untitled fiction novel (submitted for Gratiaen Prize, unpublished)
- Poly-phony Stories (autobiographical, unpublished)
- A Well Balanced Music Diet (unpublished)
- Facing Reality (unpublished)
