= Neela Wickramasinghe =

Sri Lankan singer (1950–2022)

- නීලා වික්‍රමසිංහ
- Born: Dona Delicia Neela Wickramasinghe; 30 March 1950; Wattala, Ceylon
- Died: 17 January 2022 (aged 71); Milan, Italy
- Education: Mampe Sri Sobhita Maha Vidyalaya; Piliyandala Central College
- Occupations: Singer; teacher; composer
- Spouse: Kapila Herath
- Parents: Don Francis Wickramasinghe (father); Withanaratchige Done Yasawathie Gunasekera (mother)
- Musical career
- Genres: Pop; soul; rhythm and blues; Indian classical music
- Instrument: Vocals
- Years active: 1967–2022
- Labels: Nilwala; Ransilu; Evoke

Visharada Dona Delicia Neela Wickramasinghe (Sinhala: නීලා වික්‍රමසිංහ; 30 March 1950 – 17 January 2022), popularly known as Neela Wickramasinghe, was a Sri Lankan singer, teacher, playback singer and musician. A four-time winner of the Sarasaviya Award for Best Singer, Wickramasinghe contributed a number of popular songs to the Sri Lankan music industry in a career spanning more than five decades.

== Early life and education ==
Wickramasinghe was born on 30 March 1950 in Wattala, Ceylon, as the youngest daughter of the family. Her father Don Francis Wickramasinghe was a businessman. Her mother Withanaratchige Done Yasawathie Gunasekera was a housewife. She had one elder sister, Dona Aruni Rita Wickramasinghe. She contracted polio at the age of six months. She attended Kirimatiyagara Vidyalaya for primary education and then she was admitted to Kesbewa Government private school in 1954 where she first started to be involved in music. Later she went to Mampe Sri Sobhita Maha Vidyalaya and Piliyandala Central College to complete secondary education.

== Career ==
Wickramasinghe learned music under maestro Vincent Somapala and Ananda Jayasinghe. She sang her first song for the then Radio Ceylon in 1959 for a programme 'Amateur voice.' The sixties were the most important decade for Wickramasinghe, because some of the most beautiful milestones in her music career took place in the early 60s. She won the first place in the All Island Singing Competition held in 1963 and 1965. She also won the first place in the academic category in 1965. According to an advertisement in a newspaper in 1966, she submitted an application to get involved with film background vocals. After the selection, she made her first film debut background score with Sarathchandra Herath's 1972 film Sithijaya under the music direction of Sarath Dassanayake.

In 1967 she got the privilege to record her first song with Radio Ceylon and was later selected as a B-grade singer in 1968. The song was composed by Dalton Alwis and the music was provided by Lionel Algama, "Sende Ambare Nisha Mal Yata". In 1973, she was selected as an A-grade artiste on the merit of the songs sung in the research section of the SLBC. After studying North Indian Classical Music, she graduated in 1974 with a Sangeeth Visharada Degree. In 1979, she made her first solo background film song with the film Gehenu Lamai. This song "Vio Gee Gayena Hade" was composed by Sunil Ariyaratne and composed by Nimal Mendis has remained popular since then.

Wickramasinghe had a number of popular hits including duets with T. M. Jayaratne. Some of her most popular songs include: Dethata Walalu, Sadaa Ukulu Thala, Dawasak Da Wasantha, Master Sir, Viyo Gee Gayena, Thun Sitha Dehen, Me Awanhale, Sudu Muthu Rala Pela, Parami Dam Puramu, Nil Ahas Thale, Ran Tikiri Sina, and Punchi Sithe.

Later, Wickramasinghe opted to become a teacher in music. In 1969, she first joined Vincent Somapala's Gayathri Art Institute as a trainee teacher. After teaching in several schools she decided to retire prematurely in 1998 after a period of 23 years having had a long stint of eight years at Visakha Vidyalaya, Colombo. Wickramasinghe was diagnosed with abdominal cancer in a very serious manner and survived. In the meantime, she sang in 67 films as a playback singer. She won her first Sarasaviya Award in 1984 for the song "Bodhiye Viharaye" for the film Athin Athata, and also won the Sarasaviya Award for Film Backing Vocals in 1988, 1992 and 2006. She was once awarded the Presidential Award in 1986 and the Sumathi Award in 1996 for a song in the teledrama Sankranti Samaya.

In 2012, to mark 45th anniversary of her musical career, Wickramasinghe started a solo concert named "Master Sir". She was also the music director of the teledrama Nikini Wessa. In 2013, she staged the 'Bonikko' concert on the 28 September at the Nelum Pokuna Theater with the message to the society that "a child is not an adult but a child". In that concert, she sang 28 children songs. A children's songbook titled "Bonikko" with a CD of the songs along with the lyrics, chords and illustrations were launched to coincide with the concert. In 2014, the 'Master Sir' concert was held on 26 October at the Kularatne Hall of Ananda College in aid of the Welfare Association of the Ministry of Technology and Research.

She was an active member of the Free Arts Organization during the last election season in 2018. In 2019, she was honored with The Janabhimani Best Service Award or Hela Maha Rawana Rajabhimani Award during a ceremony held at the Jasmine Auditorium at the BMICH.

== Social activity ==
=== The Mother ===
In 2002, Wickramasinghe founded a charity organization named "The Mother" with the aim of catering to children, elders and artists who made a lifetime contribution to the field. She was the president of the organization.

=== Support in the eradication of polio ===
Wickramasinghe participated in the UNICEF Project to save the children by eradicating polio from her country in 1989. She sang a song composed for this campaign, which was heard frequently over the airwaves and T.V. channels. Her efforts helped immensely to eradicate polio through this campaign and by 2000 not a single case of polio had been recorded since.

== Death ==
Wickramasinghe died in Milan, Italy, on 17 January 2022, at the age of 71 by cardiac arrest. At the time, she was serving as Consul General in Milan, Italy since September 2021. The body was treated at the San Rafael Hospital in Milan and repatriated to Sri Lanka with the coordination of the Italian and Sri Lankan authorities on 27 January 2022. Her remains were brought to her home at Pepiliyana in Dehiwala and the funeral took place on 29 January 2022 at the Kanatte Cemetery. She was survived by her husband Kapila Herath.

== Discography ==
List of songs composed by Wickramasinghe.

| Song | Lyrics | Singer |
|---|---|---|
| Kakkutu Suttan | Seetha Ranjanee | Pradeepa Dharmadasa |
| Dhelthira | Ananda Hewaranhindage | Nelu Adikari |
| Wala potin | Manju Nedagamuwa | Petronella Fernando |
| Atha dennam | Suneth Rupasinghe | Petronella Fernando |
| Jeevithaye | Chandradasa Fernando | Victor Ratnayake |
| Sihina nagaraye | Chandradasa Fernando | Victor Ratnayake |
| Mage puthanuwane | Ashoka Kovilge | Jorg Lesley Ranasinghe |
| Nirindeku wee | Chandradasa Fernando | T.M. Jayaratne |
| Thana pinne | Priyananda Vijesundara | T.M. Jayaratne |
| Sihina thusithaya | Swarna Sri Bandara | T.M. Jayaratne |
| Kandulu iwarakara | Ven.Siddhartha Thero | Rohana Bogoda |
| Edawage mathu | Priyananda Wijesundara | Amarasiri Munasinghe |
| Mee thula mee peni | Priyananda Wijesundara | Amarasiri Munasinghe |
| Viyo dukin | Thilaka Kaluarachchi | Ayesha Gunasekara |
| Mahamera se ape amma | Thilaka Kaluarachchi | Neetha Wickramathantrige |
| Balakale | Ven.Siddhartha Thero | Kapila Herath |
| Ayeth dawasaka | Ananda Hewaranhindage | Kapila Herath |
| Adasanda nivila | Sunil R. Gamage | Kapila Herath |
| Pahankala sanda | Ananda Hewaranhindage | Kapila Herath |
| Kandulusaure | Sunil R. Gamage | Kapila Herath |
| Etha himale | Ven.Siddhartha Thero | Kuma Athanayaka |
| Niwan dakna | Mahinda Disanayaka | Kuma Athanayaka |
| Hadawathak | Ven.Siddhartha Thero | Krishantha Erandaka |

== Awards ==
She has won the Sarasaviya Award thrice, Presidential award, Sumathi tele award, Zonta award and Vanitha award.

| Year | Title | Award | Production | Song | Lyrics | Music |
|---|---|---|---|---|---|---|
| 1984 | Sarasaviya Best Female Playback Singer | Sarasavi | Ethin Ethata | Bodhiye Viharaye | Ajantha Ranasinghe | Sarath Dassanayake |
| 1986 | Sarasaviya Best Female Playback Singer | Sarasavi | Dolosmahe pahana | Rasa musuwu pem kalpana | K.D.K. Dharmawardana | Premasiri Khemadasa |
| 1992 | Sarasaviya Best Female Playback Singer | Sarasavi | Dolosmahe pahana | Pemakasuwanda denila | Yapa B Senevirathna | Gratien Ananda |
| 1996 | Best Teledrama Vocalist | Sumathi Awards | Sankranthi Samaya | Nothalan Malkekulu | | |
| 2005 | Sarasaviya Best Female Playback Singer | Sarasavi | samantha | Kshithijaya ya karana | | |
