= Ajantha Ranasinghe =

Sri Lankan journalist, lyricist (1940–2016

- ආචාර්ය අජන්තා රණසිංහ
- Born: Senanayake Mudianselage Ranasinghe Arachchilage Ajantha Sarath Kumara Ranasinghe; 30 May 1940; Thalammahara, Kurunegala, Ceylon
- Died: 27 February 2016 (aged 74); Colombo National Hospital, Sri Lanka
- Education: St. John's College, Nugegoda
- Occupations: Broadcaster, lyricist, poet, novelist
- Years active: 1976–2015
- Notable work: Lyrics
- Spouse: Sarojini Weeratunga
- Children: 2

Senanayake Mudianselage Ranasinghe Arachchilage Ajantha Sarath Kumara Ranasinghe (30 May 1940 – 27 February 2016), popularly known as Dr. Ajantha Ranasinghe, was a Sri Lankan journalist, lyricist, poet, and novelist. Over the course of a 40 year career, he contributed to nearly 60 films and more than 400 songs.

== Personal life ==
Ajantha Ranasinghe was born on 30 May 1940 in Thalammahara, a small village in the Kurunegala district, as the second of five siblings. His father was a doctor and his mother was both a teacher and a postmaster. He had one elder sister, two younger sisters, and a younger brother. After obtaining his primary education at the Pannala Government School, he moved to Colombo and resumed his studies at St. John's College, Nugegoda. He left after completing the GCE Ordinary Level Exams.

Ranasinghe was married to Sarojini Weeratunge, the daughter of late singer Kokiladevi Weeratunga. The couple had two children: Saranga and Devalochana.

== Journalist career ==
Ranasinghe's uncle Asoka Pieris was a well known dramatist, and he came under his influence and through that got to showcase his talent over the airwaves. At a very young age, Ranasinghe wrote Buddhist songs to the Lama Mandapaya, a program on Radio Ceylon hosted by Karunaratne Abeysekera. He participated in another program, Radio Magazine, organised by the filmmaker K. A. W. Perera. His first published work, Thivanka Rekha, a poetry collection, came out in 1964.

He wrote poetry and short stories for the children's pages of Silumina and Peramuna. His poetry was frequently published in Silumina, Vanitha Viththi, and Lankadeepa. Eventually he was selected as a staff reporter at Dinamina. He would graduate from and to the posts of Sub Editor, Local News Editor, Additional Chief Sub Editor, Chief Sub Editor, Features Editor, and Chief Editor of Navayugaya.

== Career as a lyricist ==
After three decades in journalism, Ranasinghe began writing lyrics for singers, with his verses becoming popular among the public. He earned several awards during his career, including the Sarasaviya, OCIC, State Literary, Raigam, Sumathi, and Kumaratunga Munidasa ceremonies. In addition to being a lyricist, Ranasinghe was also a B Grade Radio Ceylon singer.

== Landmarks ==
- Awarded a doctorate degree by the International Open University, New Delhi in 1995.
- 25 years as an Editor at Lake House
- Provincial News Editor and Local News Editor at Dinamina
- Features Editor of Janatha
- Editor in Chief of Nawayugaya
- Consultant at the Sri Lanka Broadcasting Corporation (SLBC)
- President's Award for Best Song Writer of the Year on three occasions
- Lifetime Achievement Award in Journalism Awards for Excellence Programme, organised by the Editor's Guild of Sri Lanka – 2014
- A song festival Ajantha Geethavalokana was held at the Sri Lanka Foundation Institute at Independent Square on 9 May 2002
- A collection of his songs released in 2002 in a new cassette and CD titled Kalpana Vijithaya
- A second CD collection released in 2013 titled Ran Kenden

== Death ==
Ranasinghe died at the Colombo National Hospital on 27 February 2016 after an accident three days prior. His remains were kept at No. 11/4, Ranasinghe Mawatha, Hiripitiya, Pannipitiya at his son's residence. The funeral was held on 29 February 2016 at the Borella Cemetery.

== Author work ==
- Landuni Mata Varam Natha (1975)
- Vinkal Bass (1978)
- Kristhuni Karunakara Manawa (1995)
- Sihina Kumara Saha Othamo (2009)
- Thunpath Rata
- Thiwanka Rekha
- Janakanthayinge Manakantha Katha

== Filmography ==
Dr. Ranasinghe contributed over 300 lyrics to Sinhala films since 1976 with his debut, Wasana.

Year	Film
1976	Wasana
1976	Walmath Wuwo
1976	Duhul Malak
1976	Aasha
1976	Hariyata Hari
1976	Nedeyo
1977	Pembara Madu
1977	Agey Adara Kathawa
1978	Janaka Saha Manju
1978	Saara
1978	Deepanjali
1978	Sasara
1979	Geheniyak
1979	Amal Biso
1979	Muwan Pelessa
1979	Wasanthaye Dawasak
1979	Rosa Mal Thunak
1979	Chuda Manikya
1979	Anusha
1979	Sawudan Sema
1979	Nuwan Renu
1980	Kanchana
1980	Silva
1980	Ektam Ge
1980	Adara Rathne
1980	Muwan Palessa 2
1980	Sankapali
1980	Para Dige
1981	Ran Ethana
1981	Sathweni Dawasa
1981	Walampuri
1981	Bamba Ketu Hati
1981	Sooriyakantha
1981	Jeewanthi
1981	Samawenna
1981	Chanchala Rekha
1981	Saaranga
1982	Ra Manamali
1982	Yasa Isuru
1982	Anuradha
1982	Chathu Madura
1982	Rail Para
1983	Chandira
1983	Sandamali
1983	Sumithuro
1983	Siv Ranga Sena
1983	Niliyakara Pem Kalemi
1983	Chandi Siriya
1983	Athin Athata
1983	Senehasaka Kandulu
1983	Sister Mary
1983	Muwan Palessa 3
1983	Monarathenna 2
1983	Muhudu Lihini
1984	Shirani
1984	Walle Thanu Maliga
1984	Kiri Kawadi
1984	Thaththai Puthai
1984	Binari Saha Sudubanda
1984	Podi Ralahami
1984	Rana Derana
1984	Himikathara
1984	Batti
1984	Sahodariyakage Kathawa
1984	Sathi Pooja
1985	Araliya Mal
1985	Channai Kello Dennai
1985	Obata Diwura Kiyannam
1985	Doo Daruwo
1985	Kirimaduwal
1986	Mal Warusa
1986	Gimhane Gee Nade
1986	Jaya Apatai
1987	Yugayen Yugayata
1987	Kawuluwa
1987	Raja Wadakarayo
1987	Ahinsa
1988	Chandingeth Chandiya
1988	Sandakada Pahana
1988	Amme Oba Nisa
1988	Angulimala
1988	Satana
1989	Mamai Raja
1989	Nommara 17
1989	Obata Rahasak Kiyannam
1989	Shakthiya Obai Amme
1989	Sinasenna Raththaran
1990	Dase Mal Pipila
1990	Yukthiyata Wada
1990	Dedunnen Samanaliyak
1990	Walawwe Hamu
1990	Pem Rajadahana
1990	Madu Sihina
1990	Chandi Raja
1991	Paaradise
1991	Sihina Ahase Wasanthe
1991	Raja Kello
1991	Raja Sellan
1991	Esala Sanda
1991	Salambak Hadai
1991	Ran Hadawatha
1991	Dhanaya
1992	Sakwithi Raja
1992	Sakkara Suththara
1992	Sinha Raja
1992	Roomathiyay Neethiyay
1992	Suranimala
1992	Sathya
1992	Muwan Palesse Kadira
1992	Sinhayangeth Sinhaya
1993	Chaaya
1993	Prathingya
1993	Weli Sulanga
1993	Chaya Maya
1993	Yasasa
1993	Bambasara Bisawi
1993	Sandarekha
1993	Lassanai Balanna
1993	Lagin Giyoth Ehek Na
1993	Madara Parasathu
1994	Nohadan Kumariye
1994	Abhiyogaya
1994	Ambu Samiyo
1994	Sujaatha
1994	Sandamadala
1995	Inspector Geetha
1995	Wasana Wewa
1995	Ira Handa Illa
1995	Pudumai Eth Aththai
1995	Chandiyage Putha
1995	Chaandani
1996	Sihina Wimane Kumariya
1996	Sebe Mithura
1996	Hitha Honda Geheniyak
1996	Hiru Saduta Mediwee
1996	Amanthaya
1996	Madhuri
1997	Yasoma
1997	Puthuni Mata Wasana
1997	Punaruthpaththiya
1997	Ramba Saha Madhu
1997	Vijayagrahanaya
1997	Ragaye Unusuma
1998	Eya Obata Barai
1998	Yudha Gini Meda
1998	Julietge Bhumikawa
1998	Mohothin Mohotha
1999	Anduru Sewaneli
1999	Seetha Samire
1999	Nagaran
2000	Ginigath Madhusamaya
2000	Anuragaye Ananthaya
2000	Pem Kekula
2001	Oba Koheda Priye
2001	Wasanthaye Kunatuwak
2001	Kumari Bambasara Handu Daa
2002	Seethala Ginikandu
2002	Magul Sakwala
2003	Vala in London
2003	Sudu Salu
2004	Sumedhaa
2004	Left Right Sir
2004	Premawanthayo
2005	Sanduni
2005	Alu Yata Gini
2006	Eka Malaka Pethi
2006	Nilambare
2006	Rana Hansi
2007	Ran Kevita
2007	First Love Pooja
2008	Wada Bari Tarzan Mathisabayata
2008	Pitasakwala Kumarayai Pancho Hathai
2008	Ai Oba Thaniwela
2009	Ali Surathal
2009	Juliya
2009	Kanyavi
2012	Wassanaye Senehasa
2014	Raassa Kale
2015	Sanjana
2015	Aathma Warusha

== Notable lyrics ==
Ajantha Ranasinghe wrote more than 400 lyrics for singers across several generations.

- Adara Samarum Ketiwu
- Adaraneeya Wasanthe
- Api Ayeth Hamu
- Asha Nirasha Mawu
- Bodhiye Viharaye
- Bol Vee Ahuru
- Bonda Meedum Kadurelle
- Budun Methun Lowa Uththama
- Daesama Riddana
- Dawasak Thiyewi
- Degoda Thala Ganga Gala
- Dineka Mathuda
- Duhul Meedume Sihil Maruthe
- Duras Wannata Me Lesin
- Duwa Maa Wage
- Game Kopi Kade
- Ganga Jale
- Gela Wata Banda Wu
- Hanga Gallene
- Hindi Vadan
- Hiru Nonegeewa
- Igillila Yanna Yan
- Indunil Gangulal
- Irata Udin Sakwalata Udin
- Ira Udin
- Ira Wata Yana Girawun
- Ithin Ane
- Kalpana Lowa Mal Wane
- Kanden Eha
- Keena Dam Mitak
- Kiri Kawadi Sina
- Kiri Sudu Sele
- Koho Koho Kohe Idan
- Kurullo Nube Thalen
- Mage Dinapothehi
- Mage Kadulin Nimawu
- Mage Lowata Oba
- Malanika Mathakayen
- Mal Parawena Loke
- Mal Pokuru Pokuru
- Mala Giraa Gela
- Mangala Mal Dama
- Mata Mani Wage
- Mata Wasana
- Me Ayurin Api
- Me Mai Gaha Yata
- Me Pasal Meda Midulai
- Me Seetha Nille
- Midule Athana Nango
- Muthumenike Ude Rayin
- Ninda Nena Rathriye
- Niranjala Katado
- Nirwana Swarna Dwarayen
- Paalu Susaane
- Paloswaka Sanda Payanu
- Parami Dam Puramu
- Pata Podak Thilakala
- Pem Rajadahane
- Pemathura Hengum
- Pokuru Pokuru Mal Senakili
- Punchi Dawas Wala
- Ra Dolos Paye
- Ra Duru Rata Me
- Ra Pal Rakina
- Ra Vee La Ai Me Ude
- Rali Palama Sudu Patata
- Rallen Rallata Pawena Oruwe
- Rana Hansa Yuwala
- Ran Kenden Beda
- Raththaran Pem Purane
- Ruwan Wala Wimane
- Salalihiniyo
- Sanda Sangi (Praveena teledrama song)
- Sath Ruwan Wassa
- Seegiri Landune
- Sihala Kalakaruwaneni
- Sihina Nelum Mal
- Sili Sili Seethala Alle
- Siri Bo Meda
- Sithata Danena Me Lathawul
- Sudu Sesathak Wan
- Suwanda Dani Danenawa
- Suwanda Dena Malwane
- Tharu Arundati
- Ukulata Nawath
- Veedi Kone Mawatha Addara
- Wala Theerayen Eha
- Wanka Giriya
- Werale Muhuru Walle
- Villuda Punchi Depa
- Yaluwe Sithin Hadannepa
- Yadha Bime Awi
