= Tissa Abeysekara =

Sri Lankan filmmaker and writer (1939-2009)

Deshabandu Tissa Abeysekara
- තිස්ස අබේසේකර
- Born: Tissa Ananda Abeysekara; 7 May 1939; Maharagama, Sri Lanka
- Died: 18 April 2009 (aged 69); Colombo, Sri Lanka
- Other name: Tissa Ananda de Fonseka
- Education: Dharmapala Vidyalaya
- Occupation: Film director/writer
- Political party: Lanka Sama Samaja Party
- Spouse: Asanka Monarvilla (m. 1976)
- Children: 5
- Awards: Gratiaen Prize (1996), Kala Suri (1998), Deshabandu (2005)

Deshabandu Tissa Ananda Abeysekara (7 May 1939 – 18 April 2009 as තිස්ස අබේසේකර) was a Sri Lankan filmmaker, actor, writer, director, screen playwright and political activist. He is better known as a script writer for the cinema as well as a film director. In 1996, his book Bringing Tony Home won the prestigious Gratiaen Prize for the new creative writing in English. He was the chief coordinator of FOSWAL in Sri Lanka and honoured awardee of SAARC Literary Award.

== Personal life ==
Tissa Ananda Abeysekera was born Tissa Ananda Abeysekara Gunaratne de Fonseka in Maharagama, a railroad town 12 miles (19 km) southeast of Colombo to Sir Arthur Solomon de Fonseka and Agnus de Fonseka (Nee Rupesighe). Tissa's grandfather was Mudaliyar Carolis de Fonseka and is the great-grandson of Gate Mudaliyar Solomon de Fonseka. He grew up in his ancestral house, Greenlands in Havelock Town, Colombo. Tissa's paternal uncle (fathers brother) was Justice E.R. de Fonseka, QC, Puisne Judge of the Supreme Court and Acting Chief Justice of Sri Lanka in 1960 and subsequently in 1962. Tissa's father was also cousins with the late Sir Susantha de Fonseka who was also Tissa's Godfather. Tissa's father declared bankruptcy in 1949. Due to poor health, Tissa was not sent to school until age 11. Tutored at home at first, he had his formal education at Dharmapala Vidyalaya in Pannipitiya where he went onto captain the schools soccer team and be its head prefect.

He was married to Asanka Monarvilla and the couple have one daughter Svetlana, and one son, Dimitra Abeysekara.

== Death ==
Abeysekara died on 18 April 2009, at Colombo National Hospital after having been admitted for a heart condition (Myocardial infarction). The BBC stated: "The void that he has left can only be understood if one looks at a washed away painting and understands and realizes that its beauty can never be glorified or recreated again." His funeral was held over three days in four locations and remains one of the most attended funerals in the country’s history. A memorial service was held at the Chapel of the Hope of the World, Ladies' college Colombo, to commemorate the anniversary of his death.

In late 2013, the Government of Sri Lanka, under the auspices of the President, Prime Minister and Cabinet issued a Commemorative Stamp in memory and honour of the late Dr Tissa Abeysekara.

== Career ==
Abeysekera began his career as a short-story writer, writing in Sinhala, when he was still a schoolboy, and he got some short stories published in the Dinamina and Janatha national newspapers. Barely out of his teens, he published a collection of Sinhala short stories, which received favourable reviews, bringing him praise from Ediriweera Sarachchandra.

A chance meeting with Dr. Lester James Peries in the early 1960s lured him to the cinema, where he remained for the next 40 years. He received co-credit for most of Peries's films, following the screenplay he wrote for Welikatara, Tissa was launched into the world of scriptwriting and recognized as Sri Lanka's foremost screenplay, dialogue and scriptwriter. Important screenplays were those for Nidhanaya and Welikathara. In addition, he made over 40 documentaries for the Government Film Unit before breaking through as a feature filmmaker with Karumakkarayo, based on Gunadasa Amarasekara's controversial novel. This was followed by Mahagedara (1983) and Viragaya (1988), based on Martin Wickramasinghe's novel, which was thought unfilmable: Viragaya is considered one of the finest Sinhala films ever made.

Abeysekara received the Presidential Award for Best Supporting Actor in 1978 for the five minutes role as "Kudapola Thero" in the blockbuster film Veera Puran Appu. In 1996, his novella Bringing Tony Home won the Gratiaen Prize for the best piece of Creative Writing in English by a resident Sri Lankan. He continued writing mostly in English, bringing out another collection of three stories, In My Kingdom of the Sun and the Holy Peak.

He was chairman of the National Film Corporation from 1999 to 2001. He was subsequently the director of the Sri Lanka Television Training Institute. Abeysekara served on the Boards of the Sri Lanka Rupavahini Corporation and the Aesthetic Institute of Sri Lanka, affiliated to the University of Kelaniya, as a council member of the University of Visual and Performing Arts, Colombo, and as a trustee of the National Heritage Trust of Sri Lanka. In 2007, he was awarded an honorary doctorate by University of Colombo.

== National honours ==
- 1998: Kala Suri State Honour for contribution to film
- 1998: Sarvodaya National Award, for Contribution to the Communication Arts
- 1998: Vishwaprasidini State Honour for Outstanding Contribution to the Arts
- 2005: Ranathisara for Lifetime Achievement in Film in Sri Lanka at the Sarasaviya National Awards.
- 2005: Deshabandhu, National Honour by the Government of Sri Lanka

== Filmography ==
Year	Film	Role	Notes
1963	Gamperaliya	Assistant Director / Dialogue Writer	
1966	Delovak Athara	Actor / Dialogue Writer	
1969	Baduth Ekka Horu	Actor / Screen play writer	
1969	Binaramalee	Screen play writer	Sarasaviya Award (1970) for Best Script Writer
1969	Akkara Paha	Screen play writer	
1971	Welikathara	Screen play writer	
1971	Veeduru Geval	Screen play writer	
1972	Nidhanaya	Screen play writer	
1976	Loku Horu	Director	
1978	Veera Puran Appu	Actor (Kudapola Thero) / Screen play writer	Presidential Film Awards (1978) for Best Supporting Actor
1978	White Flowers for the Dead	Screen play writer	Presidential Film Awards (1978) for Best Script Writer
1980	Karumakkarayo	Director	
1980	Ganga Addara	Screen play writer	Presidential Film Awards (1980) for Best Script Writer
1982	Maha Gedara	Actor (Palitha Malwanna) / Director / Screen play writer	Presidential Film Awards (1982) for Best Script Writer; Sarasaviya Award (1983) for Best Director
1984	Maya	Screen play writer	
1984	Parasathuro	Actor (Kappetipola) / Screen play writer	
1987	Viragaya	Director / Screen play writer	Sarasaviya Awards (1988) for Best Script Writer and Best Director
1992	Kulageya	Screen play writer	Sarasaviya Award (1993) for Best Script Writer
1993	Gurugedara	Screen play writer	Sarasaviya Award (1994) for Best Script Writer
1996	Loku Duwa	Screen play writer	Presidential Film Awards (1996) for Best Script Writer
2003	Sakman Maluwa	Dialogue Writer	
2003	Ammawarune	Actor (Ven. Rathanapala Thero)	
2007	Uppalawanna	Screen play writer	
2012	Kusa Pabha	Screen play writer	
2012	Senasuru Maruwa	Screen play writer	
2017	Nimnayaka Hudekalawa	Actor (Mysterious man)	
2019	Vijayaba Kollaya	Screen Play Writer	

== Published works ==
- Ipanella (short stories)
- Pitagamkarayo (teledrama)
- Ayale Giya Sithaka Satahan (essays)
- Rupa-Svarupa (essay on film)
- Cinema Sithuvili (on the art of film)
- Bringing Tony Home A story in three movements (Forbidden Territory, 1995; first US publication by North Atlantic Books, 2008)
- In My Kingdom of the Sun and the Holy Peak (Vijitha Yapa Publications, 2004)
- Roots, Reflections and Reminiscences (Sarasavi Publishers, 2007)
- Wiwurtha Arthikaya, Rupavahiniya, Chithrapata Sansthawa Saha Sinamawe Arbudayaya (1991)
- Wiragaya - Screenplay (1993)
- Guru Gedara - Screenplay (2011)
