= Nilambare =

Nilambare නිලම්බරේ
- Directed by: Kalum Palitha Mahirathna
- Written by: Sujeewa Prasannaarachchi
- Based on: Novel by Sujeewa Prasannaarachchi
- Produced by: Nilwala Films
- Starring: Ranjan Ramanayake; Sanath Gunathilake; Dilhani Ekanayake
- Cinematography: Ruwan Costa
- Edited by: Ravindra Guruge
- Music by: Navaratne Gamage; Kasun Kalhara
- Production companies: Prasad Color Lab, Chennai
- Release date: 23 March 2006
- Country: Sri Lanka
- Language: Sinhala

Nilambare (Sinhala: නිළම්බරේ) is a 2006 Sri Lankan Sinhalese romantic film directed by Kalum Palitha Mahirathna and produced by Upul Jayasinha for Nilwala Films. It stars Ranjan Ramanayake, Sanath Gunathilake, and Dilhani Ekanayake in lead roles along with Semini Iddamalgoda, and Sangeetha Weeraratne. Music composed by Sarath de Alwis. It is the 1069th Sri Lankan film in the Sinhalese cinema.

== Cast ==
- Ranjan Ramanayake as Nirwan
- Dilhani Ekanayake as Samadhi
- Ravindra Randeniya as Jayasuriya
- Sanath Gunathilake as Nimal
- Semini Iddamalgoda as Nimal's wife
- Veena Jayakody
- Anarkali Akarsha as Sherine
- Sangeetha Weeraratne as Madhu
- Anton Jude as Podiyan
- Ratnawali Kekunawala as mother of Nimal and Nirwan
- Kanchana Kodithuwakku as Sudesh
- Anjula Rajapakse as Shalani
- Hector Dias

== Soundtrack ==
No.	Title	Lyrics	Singer(s)	Length
1.	"Sanda Nil Thalaawe"	Saman Chandranath Weerasinghe	Uresha Ravihari, Kingsley Pieris
2.	"Siyak Siyawara"		Kasun Kalhara, Hector Dias, Rashmi Sangeetha
3.	"Pawane Igili Me Nilambare"		Uresha Ravihari, Kingsley Pieris
4.	"Pawane Igili Yanna Epa"		Nirosha Virajini
5.	"Mal Mal Piyali Sale"		Uresha Ravihari
6.	"Sihinen Jeevithayama"		Kasun Kalhara, Rashmi Sangeetha
7.	"Soya Soya Unnemi"		Uresha Ravihari, Kingsley Pieris
