= Sarasaviya Best Emerging Actor Award =

Sri Lankan film award

The Sarasaviya Best Emerging Actor/Actress Award is presented annually by the weekly Sarasaviya newspaper in collaboration with the Associated Newspapers of Ceylon Limited at the Sarasaviya Awards Festival. The 2025 winner was Megha Suriyaachchi (Mandara) and Abhilashi Santhushki (Sinhabahu).

Although the Sarasaviya Awards Ceremony began in 1964, this award was introduced much later. Following is a list of the winners of this title since then.

2016– Ishara Wickramasinghe

Year	Actor
2004	Arjuna Kamalanath
