= Sumitra Peries =

Sri Lankan film director and diplomat (1934–2023)

- සුමිත්‍රා පීරිස්
- Born: 24 March 1935; Avissawella, British Ceylon
- Died: 19 January 2023 (aged 87); Colombo, Sri Lanka
- Occupation: Filmmaker
- Spouse: Lester James Peries (1964–2018)

Sumitra Peries (March 24, 1935–January 19, 2023) was a Sri Lankan filmmaker. She was the first female film director from Sri Lanka. and was known as the "Poetess of Sinhala Cinema". She also held the post of Sri Lanka's ambassador to France, Spain and the United Nations in the late 1990s. Of her films the more popular ones are Gehenu Lamai, Ganga Addara and Yahaluvo. She was married to the most prolific Sri Lankan film director Dr. Lester James Peries.

== Early life ==
=== Education ===
Peries began her education in Avissawella, then later enrolled to Visakha Vidyalaya in Colombo, and finally joined the Aquinas College Colombo to do the London Advanced Level. At the age of 20 Sumitra managed to find some money and traveled to Europe by ship to meet her elder brother Gamini. She was going to build her own career there, although she didn't know it at the time.

Peries studied filmmaking at the London School of Film Technique and was awarded a Diploma in Film Direction and Production (1957–1959).

== Filmography ==
Peries won the award for the best film director in fifty years of Sri Lankan cinema.

Year	Film	Ref.
1978	Gehenu Lamai	
1980	Ganga Addara	
1982	Yahalu Yeheli	
1984	Maya	
1988	Sagara Jalaya Madi Handuwa Oba Handa	
1996	Loku Duwa	
1997	Duwata Mawaka Misa	
2003	Sakman Maluwa	
2018	Vaishnavee	

== Personal life and death ==
Sumitra married Lester James Peries (1919–2018) on June 19, 1964, at All Saints Church, Borella, and a reception was held at the residence of Anton Wickremasinghe afterwards.

Peries died on January 19, 2023, at the age of 87.

== Honours ==
- The title of Kala Keerthi by the Government of Sri Lanka in 2005
- The Order of the Rising Sun, Gold and Silver Rays by the Government of Japan in 2021
- Awarded an honorary doctorate from the University of Kelaniya for her outstanding contribution to local cinema.

== Awards ==
- Rana Thisara Lifetime Achievement Award (1993)

== The Lester James Peries and Sumitra Peries Foundation ==
The Lester James Peries and Sumitra Peries Foundation was inaugurated in 2011, at the BMICH with an oration by the chief guest, celebrated Indian film-maker Padma Vibushan Dr. Adoor Gopalakrishnan, and the Speaker of Parliament, Chamal Rajapakse, as the Guest of Honor. The Foundation is incorporated through an act of Parliament of the Democratic Socialist Republic of Sri Lanka.

== See also ==
- Sri Lankan Non Career Diplomats
