= Sarasaviya Best Emerging Actress Award =

Sri Lankan film award

The Sarasaviya Best Emerging Actress Award is presented annually by the weekly Sarasaviya newspaper in collaboration with the Associated Newspapers of Ceylon Limited at the Sarasaviya Awards Festival. Although the Sarasaviya Awards Ceremony began in 1964, this award was introduced much later. Following is a list of the winners of this title since then.

Year	Actor
1993	Judy de Silva
2004	Chaturika Peiris
