= Sarasaviya Most Popular Actor Award =

Sri Lankan film award

The Sarasaviya Most Popular Actor Award is presented annually by the weekly Sarasaviya newspaper in collaboration with the Associated Newspapers of Ceylon Limited at the Sarasaviya Awards Festival. This award is decided solely by popular vote, chosen based on ballots submitted by readers of the newspaper.

Although the Sarasaviya Awards ceremony began in 1964, this category was introduced in 1966. Gamini Fonseka was selected as the inaugural recipient. Fonseka held the title across two decades, spanning from his performance in Ranmuthu Duwa (1962) to Sakvithi Suvaya (1982). Following 1983, actor-turned-politician Vijaya Kumaratunga won the award for five consecutive years. Subsequent recipients included Sanath Gunathilake, Jeevan Kumaratunga, and Ranjan Ramanayake.

== Winners ==
Below is a list of known recipients of the Sarasaviya Most Popular Actor Award since 1966.

Year	Actor
2024 Lux	Hemal Ranasinghe
2020	Uddika Premarathna
2019	Kalana Gunasekara
2018	Not awarded
2016	Not awarded
2006	Channa Perera
2004	Ranjan Ramanayake
2003	Ranjan Ramanayake
2002	Ranjan Ramanayake
2001	Ranjan Ramanayake

== See also ==
- Sarasaviya Awards
- Sarasaviya Best Actor Award
