= Sarasaviya Most Popular Actress Award =

Sri Lankan film award

The Sarasaviya Most Popular Actress Award is presented annually by the weekly Sarasaviya newspaper in collaboration with the Associated Newspapers of Ceylon Limited at the Sarasaviya Awards Festival. This award is decided solely on popular vote and is chosen based on the verdict given by the readers of the weekly Sarasaviya. Although the Sarasaviya Awards Ceremony began in 1964, this award was introduced two years later, in 1966. Jeevarani Kurukulasuriya was chosen as the most popular actress, that year. Anula Karunathilake, Malini Fonseka, Geetha Kumarasinghe, Sabeetha Perera, Dilhani Ekanayake and Sangeetha Weeraratne were the actresses who were eventually crowned as the Most Popular Actresses.

Following is a list of the winners of this prestigious title since 1966.

| Year | Actress |
|---|---|
| 2007 | Sangeetha Weeraratne |
| 2006 | Sangeetha Weeraratne |
| 2005 | Sangeetha Weeraratne |
| 2004 | Anarkalli Aakarsha Jayatileke |
| 2003 | Sangeetha Weeraratne |
| 2002 | Sangeetha Weeraratne |
| 2001 | Sangeetha Weeraratne |
| 2000 |
