= Sarasaviya Best Supporting Actor Award =

Sri Lankan film award

The Sarasaviya Best Supporting Actor Award is presented annually by the weekly Sarasaviya newspaper in collaboration with the Associated Newspapers of Ceylon Limited at the Sarasaviya Awards Festival. Although the Sarasaviya Awards Ceremony began in 1964, this award was introduced in 1969. Following is a list of the winners of this prestigious title since then.

Year	Actor	Film
2015	Jayalath Manorathne	Ho gaana pokuna
2008	Saumya Liyanage	Walapatala
2007	Sanath Gunathilake	Aganthukaya
2006	Jayalath Manorathne	Berunda Pakshiya
2005	Jackson Anthony	Garilla Marketing
2004	Mahendra Perera	Ran Diya Dahara
2003	Jayalath Manorathne	Sudu Kaluwara
2002	S. Selvasekaran	Punchi Suranganawi
2001	Joe Abeywickrama	Kinihiriya Mal
2000
1970	Piyadasa Gunasekara	Binaramalee
