= Sarasaviya Best Supporting Actress Award =

Sri Lankan film award

The Sarasaviya Best Supporting Actress Award is presented annually by the weekly Sarasaviya newspaper in collaboration with the Associated Newspapers of Ceylon Limited at the Sarasaviya Awards Festival. Although the Sarasaviya Awards Ceremony began in 1964, this award was introduced in 1969. Following is a list of the winners of this title since then.

Year	Actress	Film
2015	Damitha Abeyrathne	Pravegaya
2008	Malini Fonseka	Aba
2007	Chandani Seneviratne	Uppalawanna
2006	Gayani Gisanthika	Ammawerune
2005	Kaushalya Fernando	Sulanga Enu Pinisa
2004	Grace Ariyawimal	Gini Kirilli
2003	Vasanthi Chathurani	Wekande Walauwa
2002	Irangani Serasinghe	Sudu Sevanali
2001	Sangeetha Weeraratne	Kinihiriya Mal
2000
1970	Shanthi Lekha	Binaramalee
