= Sarasaviya Best Music Direction Award =

Sri Lankan film award

The Sarasaviya Best Music Direction Award is presented annually by the weekly Sarasaviya newspaper in collaboration with the Associated Newspapers of Ceylon Limited at the Sarasaviya Awards Festival. Although the Sarasaviya Awards Ceremony began in 1964, this award was introduced much later. Following is a list of the winners of this prestigious title since then.

Year	Music-Director	Film
2008	Nadeeka Guruge	Aba
2007	Navarathna Gamage	Uppalawanna
2006	Sarath Fernando	Uduganyamaya
2005	Premasiri Khemadasa	Garilla Marketing
2004	Lakshman Joseph de Saram	Mille Soya
2003	Navarathna Gamage	Sulang Kirilli
2002	Premasiri Khemadasa	Agnidahaya
2001
