= Sarasaviya Best Actress Award =

Sri Lankan film award

The Sarasaviya Best Actress Award is presented annually by the weekly Sarasaviya newspaper in collaboration with the Associated Newspapers of Ceylon Limited at the Sarasaviya Awards Festival.

The award was first given in 1964. Frequent winners include Swarna Mallawarachchi (5), Anoja Weerasinghe (4) and Geetha Kumarasinghe (4).

Following is a list of the winners of this prestigious title since then.

| Year | Actress | Film |
|---|---|---|
| 2025 | Thilakshani Ratnayake | Doosra |
| 2020 | Nita Fernando | Paanshu |
| 2019 | Samadhi Laksiri | Dekala Purudu Kenek |
| 2018 | Not Awarded | |
| 2017 | Samanalee Fonseka | Premaya Nam |
| 2016 | Pooja Umashankar | Sarigama |
| 2015 | Anjali Patil | Oba Nathuwa Oba Ekka |
| 2008 | Dulani Anuradha | Aba |
| 2007 | Sangeetha Weeraratne | Uppalawanna |
| 2006 | Chandani Seneviratne | Uduganyamaya |
| 2005 | Dilhani Asokamala | Sudu Kalu Saha Alu |
| 2004 | Geetha Kumarasinghe | Ran Diya Dahara |
| 2003 | Damitha Abeyratne | Sulang Kirilli |
| 2002 | Nithyawani Kandasami | Punchi Suranganawi |
| 2001 | Sangeetha Weeraratne | Aswesuma |
| 2000 | Geetha Kumarasinghe | Rajya Sevaya Pinisai |
| 1999 | | |
| 1998 | Swarna Mallawarachchi | Channa Kinnari |
| 1997 | Swarna Mallawarachchi | Bawa Duka |
| 1996 | Geetha Kumarasinghe | Loku Duwa |
| 1995 | Irangani Serasinghe | Pawana Ralu Wiya |
| 1994 | Anoja Weerasinghe | Surabi Dena |
| 1993 | Sriyani Amarasena | Kula Geya |
| 1992 | Anoja Weerasinghe | Keli Madala |
| 1991 | Geetha Kumarasinghe | Palama Yata |
| 1990 | Anoja Weerasinghe | Siri Medura |
| 1989 | Swarna Mallawarachchi | Sagara Jalaya |
| 1988 | Sabeetha Perera | Podi Wije |
| 1987 | Anoja Weerasinghe | Maldeniye Simion |
| 1986 | Swarna Mallawarachchi | Suddilage Kathawa |
| 1985 | Sabeetha Perera | Deweni Gamani |
| 1984 | Swarna Mallawarachchi | Dadayama |
| 1983 | Malini Fonseka | Yasa Isuru |
| 1982 | Malini Fonseka | Aradhana |
| 1981 | Vasanthi Chathurani | Ganga Addara |
| 1980 | Malini Fonseka | Hingana Kolla |
| 1970 | Swarna Kahawita | Binaramalee |
| 1969 | Anula Karunathilake | Golu Hadawatha |
| 1968 | Punya Heendeniya | Ran Salu |
| 1967 | Irangani Serasinghe | Oba Dutu Da |
| 1966 | | |
| 1965 | Sobani Amarasinghe | Getawarayo |
| 1964 | Punya Heendeniya | Gamperaliya |
