= Sarasaviya Best Lyricist Award =

Sri Lankan film award

The Sarasaviya Best Lyricist Award is presented annually by the weekly Sarasaviya newspaper in collaboration with the Associated Newspapers of Ceylon Limited at the Sarasaviya Awards Festival. Although the Sarasaviya Awards Ceremony began in 1964, this award was introduced much later. Following is a list of the winners of this prestigious title since then.

Year	Singer	Film
2004	Lucien Bulathsinhala	Randiya Dahara
2003
1970	Mahagama Sekara	Binaramalee
