= Sarasaviya Best Male Playback Singer Award =

Sri Lankan film award

The Sarasaviya Best Male Playback Singer Award is presented annually by the weekly Sarasaviya newspaper in collaboration with the Associated Newspapers of Ceylon Limited at the Sarasaviya Awards Festival. Although the Sarasaviya Awards Ceremony began in 1964, this award was introduced much later.

Following is a list of the award winners since its introduction:

Year	Artist	Film
1964	Narada Disasekera	Ranmuthu Duwa
1965	W. D. Amaradeva	Getawarayo
1966	Mohideen Baig	Alappu Gedera
1967	W. D. Amaradeva	Senasuma Kothanada
1968	W. D. Amaradeva	Sath Samuduru
1969	Victor Ratnayake	Adara Wanthayo
1970	W. D. Amaradeva	Binaramalee
1971–1979	no award	
1980	W. D. Amaradeva	Muwan Palessa
1981	W. D. Amaradeva	Siribo Aiya
1982	W.D. Amaradeva	Aradhana
1983	H. R. Jothipala	Mihidum Sihina
1984	Milton Mallawarachchi	Aethin Aethata
1985	Shelton Perera	Sasara Chetana
1986	H. R. Jothipala	Obata Divara Kiyanam
1987	Sunil Edirisinghe	Puja
1988	Sanath Nandasiri	Mangala Thegga
1989	Sunil Edirisinghe	Sandakada Pahana
1990	Amarasiri Peiris	Siri Madura
1991	Vijaya Kumaratunga	Saharawe Sihinaya
1992	Vijaya Kumaratunga	Dolos Mahase Pihina
1993	Greshan Ananda	Raja Tharuwo
1994	Rookantha Gunathilake	Saptha Kanya (film)
1995	W. D. Amaradeva	Ahas Maliga
1996	Rookantha Gunathilake	Chiti
1997	Gunadasa Kapuge	Bithusithuwam
1998	Gunadasa Kapuge	Visidela
1999–2001	no award	
2002	Sunil Edirisinghe	Poronduwa
2004	Amarasiri Peiris	Rajjumala
2005		
2006		
2007	Kasun Kalhara	Sikuru Hathe
2008	Edward Jayakody	Siri Raja Siri
2015	Edward Jayakody	
