= Sarasaviya Best Director Award =

Sri Lankan newspaper film award

The Sarasaviya Best Director Award is presented annually by the weekly Sarasaviya newspaper in collaboration with the Associated Newspapers of Ceylon Limited as part of the Sarasaviya Awards Festival. It was first given in 1964.

Following is a partial list of the winners of this prestigious title since then.

Year	Director	Film
2015	Prasanna Vithanage	Oba Nathuwa Oba Ekka
2008	Vijitha Gunarathne	Walapatala
2007	Wasantha Obeysekara	Aganthukaya
2006	Sudath Devapriya	Uduganyamaya
2005	Prasanna Vithanage	Ira Mediyama
2004	Vishvanath Buddhika Keerthisena	Mille Soya
2003	Inoka Sathyangani Keerthinanda	Sulang Kirilli
2002	Wasantha Obeysekara	Salelu Warama
2001	Bennet Ratnayake	Aswesuma
1997	Dharmasiri Bandaranayake	Bawa Duka
1995	Gamini Fonseka	Nomiyena Minisun
1994	Vijaya Dharma Sri	Guru Gedara
1993	H.D. Premaratne	Kula Geya
1992	D.B. Nihalsinghe	Keli Madala
1991	H.D. Premaratne	Palama Yata
1990	Parakrama Niriella	Siri Medura
1989	Sumitra Peiris	Sagara Jalaya
1988	Tissa Abeysekara	Viragaya
1987	D.B. Nihalsinghe	Maldeniye Simion
1986	Dharmasiri Bandaranayake	Suddilage Kathawa
1985	Sumitra Peiris	Maya
1984	Wasantha Obeysekara	Dadayama
1983	Tissa Abeysekara	Mahagedara
1982	Gamini Fonseka	Sagarayak Meda
1981	Sumitra Peiris	Ganga Addara
1980	Titus Thotawatte	Handaya
1970	Mudalinayake Somaratne	Binaramalee
1969	Lester James Peiris	Golu Hadawatha
1968	Siri Gunasinghe	Sath Samudura
1967	Lester James Peiris	Delovak Athara
1966	Tissa Liyansooriya	Sarawita
1965	Mike Wilson, Tissa Liyansooriya	Getawarayo
1964	Lester James Peiris	Gamperaliya
