= Sarasaviya Best Film Award =

Sri Lankan film award

The Sarasaviya Best Film Award is presented annually in Sri Lanka by the weekly Sarasaviya newspaper in collaboration with the Associated Newspapers of Ceylon Limited at the Sarasaviya Awards Festival for the best Sri Lankan movie of the year. The award was first given in 1964. Following is a list of the winners of this prestigious title since then.

Year	Film	Producer
2026	Bahuchithawadiya	Malaka Dewapriya
2015	Maharaja Gemunu	Gunapala Rathnasekara
2008	Machan	Prasanna Vithanage
2007	Aganthukaya	National Film Corporation of Sri Lanka, Anura Abeysekara
2006	Uduganyamaya	Sudath Devapriya
2005	Ira Mediyama	Prasanna Vithanage
2004	Mille Soya	Vishvanath Buddhika Keerthisena
2003	Sakman Maluwa	Anthony Page
2002	Sudu Sewaneli	Prof. Sunil Ariyaratne
2001	Purahanda Kaluwara	Prasanna Vithanage
2000
1999
1998
1997
1996	Loku Duwa	Geetha Kumarasinghe
1995	Nomiyena Minisun	Bernard Gunasekara
1994	Guru Gedara	M.H. Piyasena
1993	Kula Geya	A.A. Jaje
1992	Keli Madala	Anoja Weerasinghe, Gamini Nanayakkara
1991	Palama Yata	Geetha Kumarasinghe
1990	Sirimedura	Bandula Gunawardena
1989	Sagara Jalaya	Harsha Kumara Navaratne
1988	Viragaya	C. Mallawarachchi
1987	Maldeniye Simion	Vijaya Ramanayake
1986	Suddilage Kathaawa	Bandula Gunawardena
1985	Maya	Lester James Peiris
1984	Dadayama	Rabeen Chandrasiri
1983	Mahagedara	Chandrasiri Gangeoda
1982	Sagarayak Meda	Ananda Abeynayake
1981	Ganga Addara	Milina Sumathipala
1980	Handaya	Titus Thotawatte
1970	Binaramalee	Mudalinayake Somaratne
1969	Golu Hadawatha	Lanka Studio
1968	Sath Samudura	Leenus Dissanayake
1967	Sensasuma Kothenada	Somasiri Perera
1966	Sarawita	Shesha Palihakkara
1965	Getawarayo	Shesha Palihakkara
1964	Gamperaliya	Anton Wickremasinghe
