= Sarasaviya Best Cinematographer Award =

The Sarasaviya Best Director Award is presented annually by the weekly Sarasaviya newspaper in collaboration with the Associated Newspapers of Ceylon Limited as part of the Sarasaviya Awards Festival. It was first given in 1964.

Following is a partial list of the winners of this prestigious title since then.

Year	Director	Film
1979	Andrew Jayamanne	Handaya
1979	Andrew Jayamanne	Palangatiyo
1990	Andrew Jayamanne	Siri Madura
1983	Andrew Jayamanne	Thunveni Yamaya
