= Sarasaviya Best Actor Award =

Award presented annually by the weekly Sarasaviya newspaper

The Sarasaviya Best Actor Award is presented annually by the weekly Sarasaviya newspaper in collaboration with the Associated Newspapers of Ceylon Limited at the Sarasaviya Awards Festival. The award was first given in 1964 .

Following is a list of the winners of this prestigious title since then.

Year	Actor	Film
2020	Kumara Thirimadura	The Newspaper
2019	Bimal Jayakodi	Dekala Purudu Kenek
2017	Saumya Liyanage	Nimnayaka Hudakalawa
2016	Dasun Pathirana	Motor Bicycle
2015	Jackson Anthony	Maharaja Gemunu
2008	Dharmapriya Dias	Machan
2007	Saumya Liyanage	Aganthukaya
2006	Ranjan Ramanayake	Nilambare
2005	Mahendra Perera	Sudu Kalu Saha Alu
2004	Jackson Anthony	Ran Diya Dahara
2003	Sanath Gunathilake	Sakman Maluwa
2002	Kamal Addararachchi	Agnidahaya
2001	Joe Abeywickrama	Purahanda Kaluwara
2000
1999
1998
1997	Joe Abeywickrama	Bithu Sithuwam
1996
1995	Linton Semage	Mee Haraka
1994	Asoka Peiris	Guru Gedara
1993	Joe Abeywickrama	Umayangana
1992	Joe Abeywickrama	Golu Muhude Kunatuwak
1991	Sanath Gunathilake	Palama Yata
1990	Ravindra Randeniya	Siri Medura
1989	Ravindra Randeniya	Sandakada Pahana
1988	Sanath Gunathilake	Viragaya
1987	Joe Abeywickrama	Maldeniye Simion
1986	Gamini Fonseka	Yuganthaya
1985	Ravindra Randeniya	Maya
1984	Ravindra Randeniya	Dadayama
1983	Joe Abeywickrama	Malata Noena Bambaru
1982	Joe Abeywickrama	Baddegama
1981	Gamini Fonseka	Uthumaneni
1980	Gamini Fonseka	Sarungale
1970	Herbert M. Seneviratne	Senehasa
1969	D.R. Nanayakkara	Bicycle Hora
1968	Gamini Fonseka	Horungeth Horu
1967	Gamini Fonseka	Parasathu Mal
1966	Joe Abeywickrama	Sarawita
1965	Gamini Fonseka	Dheewarayo
1964	D.R. Nanayakkara	Sikuru Tharuwa
