= Sarasaviya Best Female Playback Singer =

Sri Lankan film award

The Sarasaviya Best Female Playback Singer Award is presented annually by the weekly Sarasaviya newspaper in collaboration with the Associated Newspapers of Ceylon Limited at the Sarasaviya Awards Festival. Although the Sarasaviya Awards Ceremony began in 1964, this award was introduced much later. Out of the award-winning singers, Nanda Malini has won the most, 12 Sarasaviya Awards. Following is a list of the winners of this prestigious title since then.

Year	Singer	Film
2020	Dr.Nanda Malini	The Newspaper
2019	Umariya Sinhawansa	Ginnen Upan Seethala
2015	Nirosha Virajini	Maharaja Gemunu
2008	Uresha Ravihari	Rosa Kale
2007	Uresha Ravihari	Asai Man Piyabanna
2006	Uresha Ravihari	Anjalika
2005	Wisharad. Neela Wickramasinghe	Samantha
2004	Deepika Priyadarshani Peiris	Aadaraneeya Wassaanaya
2003	Nirosha Virajini	Kinihiriya Mal
2002	Dr.Nanda Malini	Sudu Sevanali
1970	Kalashuri Latha Walpola	Naarilatha
1969	Dr.Nanda Malini	Aadarawanthyo
1968	Dr.Nanda Malini	Sadol Kandulu
1967	KalaShuri Dr.Sujatha Attanayake	Parasathumal
1966	Dr.Nanda Malini	Saaravita
1965	Kalashuri Latha Walpola	Getawarayo
1964	Dr.Nanda Malini	Ranmudu duwa
