= Associated Newspapers of Ceylon Limited =

Newspaper industry

Associated Newspapers of Ceylon
- Type: Government-owned corporation
- Industry: Media
- Founded: 1926; 100 years ago
- Founder: D. R. Wijewardena
- Headquarters: Colombo, Sri Lanka
- Area served: Sri Lanka
- Key people: Mr. Gamini Warushamana (Chairman & Managing Director) Mr. Sisira Yapa (Director Editorial); Mr. Channa Kevitiyagala (Director Finance); Mr. Chamara Nanayakkarawasam (Director Legal); Mr. Chamara Janaraj Peiris (Director Operation)
- Products: Newspapers
- Revenue: ▲ Rs 3.050 billion (2016)
- Operating income: ▲ Rs 28.008 million (2016)
- Net income: ▲ Rs 20.608 million (2016)
- Total assets: ▲ Rs 1.920 billion (2016)
- Total equity: ▲ Rs 542.388 million (2016)
- Owner: Government of Sri Lanka (87%)
- Number of employees: 1,526 (2016)
- Website: www.lakehouse.lk

Associated Newspapers of Ceylon Limited (ANCL), also known as Lake House, is a print media company in Sri Lanka. It publishes three daily, three weekend, five weekly, two monthly and three annual publications in Sinhala, English and Tamil.

Associated Newspapers of Ceylon Limited is a public limited liability company incorporated in Sri Lanka in 1926 by its founder D. R. Wijewardena. 75% of its shares were Nationalized under the Associated Newspapers of Ceylon Limited (Special Provisions) Law No. 28 of 1973 and this stake is held by the Public Trustee of Sri Lanka on behalf of the Government. Lake House is Sri Lanka's oldest publication company. Its Daily News English daily was the first Sri Lankan newspaper to be published on-line. At present Dinamina, Resa, Daily News, Thinakaran, Sunday Observer, Silumina, Budusarana and Sarasaviya publications are available on-line.

ANCL is in the process of introducing all publications to the ANCL website in the near future thus giving Sri Lankan expatriates as well as foreign communities opportunities of accessing news in Sri Lanka.

During the 2018 Sri Lankan Constitutional Crisis, the Lakehouse building was the site of many skirmishes between loyalists of former president Mahinda Rajapaksa and Prime Minister Ranil Wickremesinghe, due to the government-owned nature of the publications housed within the building.
