= 26th Sarasaviya Awards =

1998 awards festival for Sinhala cinema

- Date: November 27, 1998
- Site: Bandaranaike Memorial International Conference Hall, Colombo 07, Sri Lanka
- Directed by: Tilakaratne Kuruwita Bandara

Highlights
- Best Picture: Bawa Duka
- Most awards: Bawa Duka (9)
- Most nominations: Bawa Duka

Television coverage
- Network: Associated Newspapers of Ceylon Limited

The 26th Sarasaviya Awards festival (Sinhala: 26වැනි සරසවිය සම්මාන උලෙළ), presented by the Associated Newspapers of Ceylon Limited, was held to honor the best films of 1996 Sinhala cinema on November 27, 1998, at the Bandaranaike Memorial International Conference Hall, Colombo 07, Sri Lanka. Her Excellency The President Chandrika Kumaratunga was the chief guest at the awards night.

The film Bawa Duka won the nine prestigious awards including Best Film.

== Awards ==
Category	Film	Recipient
Best Film	Bawa Duka	Ven. Vijayapura Pagngnananna Thero; Jayaratne Wadduwage
Best Director	Bawa Duka	Dharmasiri Bandaranayake
Best Script Writer	Bawa Duka	Dharmasiri Bandaranayake
Best Actor	Bawa Duka	Jackson Anthony
Best Actress	Bawa Duka	Swarna Mallawarachchi
Best Supporting Actor	Bawa Duka	Ravindra Randeniya
Best Supporting Actress	Visidela	Grace Ariyavimal
Best Cinematographer (black n' white film)		Not Awarded
Best Cinematographer (color film)	Bawa Duka	Lal Wickramaarchchi
Best Editor	Visidela	Elmo Halliday
Best Music Direction	Visidela	Rohana Weerasinghe
Best Art Direction	Bawa Duka	K. A. Milton Perera
Best Sound Effects	Bawa Karma	Lionel Gunaratne
Best Makeup	Bawa Duka	J. Suranimala
Best Lyricist	Visidela	H. D. Premaratne
Best Male Playback Singer	Visidela	Gunadasa Kapuge
Best Female Playback Singer	Savithrige Rathriya	Pradeepa Dharmadasa
Most Popular Film	Visidela	Soma Edirisinghe
Best Upcoming Actor		Not Awarded
Best Upcoming Actress	Duwata Mawaka Misa	Ama Wijesekara
A. F. L. Star Plus Award	contribution to Sinhala cinema	Tissa Abeysekara
Rana Thisara Award	contribution to Sinhala cinema	Stanley Perera
Rana Thisara Award	contribution to Sinhala cinema	Angeline Gunathilake
Special Merit Awards	Bawa Karma	Simon Navagattegama
Special Merit Awards	Sudu Akka	Sanoja Bibile
Special Merit Awards	Tharanaya	Daya Thennakoon
Special Merit Awards	Puthuni Mata Wasana	Kusala B. Perera
Special Merit Awards	Apaye Thappara 84000k	Dinesh Priyasad
Special Merit Awards	Savithrige Rathriya	Smantha Neelawathura

Category	Film
Popular films included in the festival	Visidela
Popular films included in the festival	Ragaye Unusuma
Popular films included in the festival	Aege Vairaya 2
Popular films included in the festival	Yasoma
Popular films included in the festival	Bawa Duka
Popular films included in the festival	Duwata Mawaka Misa
Popular films included in the festival	Sudu Akka
