= Andrew Jayamanne =

Sri Lankan cinematographer

- ඇන්ඩෘ ජයමාන්න
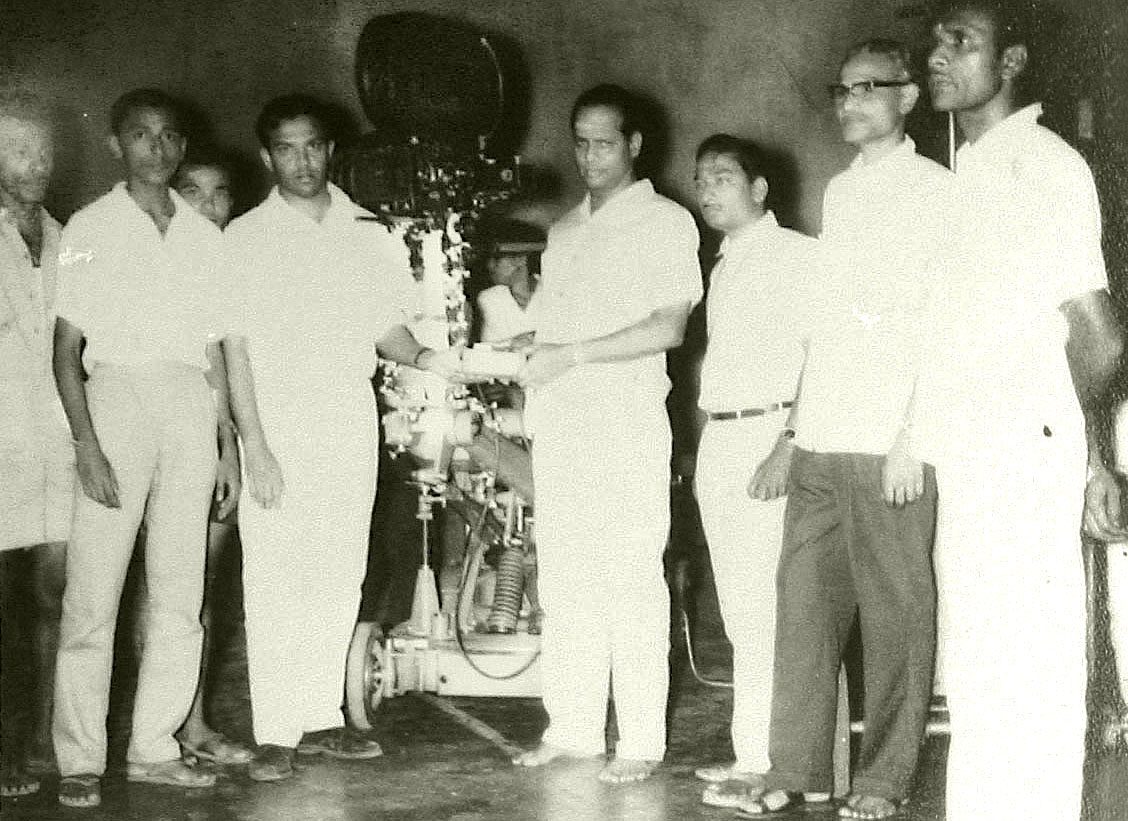
- Pudumaya (second on the left) at the opening of Ataweni Pudumaya (Sinhala: අටවෙනි පුදුමය), 1968
- Born: Andrew Felix Jayamanne; 9 November 1943; Negombo, British Ceylon
- Died: 29 August 2014 (aged 70); Milan, Italy
- Occupations: Cinematographer; film director; television director; film producer; television producer
- Years active: 1962–2014
- Notable work: Haralakshaya (Sinhala: හාරලක්ෂය); Mangala (Sinhala: මංගලා); Maruwa Samaga Vase (Sinhala: මරුවා සමග වාසේ); Handaya (Sinhala: හඳයා); Palagatiyo (Sinhala: පලගැටියෝ); Siri Madura (Sinhala: සිරි නිවස); Hansa Wilak (Sinhala: හන්ස විලක්); Thunveni Yamaya (Sinhala: තුන්වෙනියාමය); Suddilage Kathawa (Sinhala: සුද්දිලාගේ කතාව); Julietge Bhoomikawa (Sinhala: ජුලියෙට්ගේ භුමිකාව); Sathipooja (Sinhala: සතිපූජා)
- Television: Kopi Kade (Sinhala: කෝපි කඩේ)
- Spouse: Beranadeth Thissera
- Children: 3

Andrew Jayamanne^{α} (Sinhala: ඇන්ඩෘ ජයමාන්න ; 1943–2014) was a Sri Lankan cinematographer, producer and director for television and film.

== Early life ==
Jayamanne was the eldest of ten children born to Vincent Jayamanne and his wife Beatrice Perera. He was raised in Periyamulla in Negombo, the town on the Western sea-coast where his father was born. Jayamanne did his elementary studies at St. Anthony's boys' School, Dalupotha, Negombo. In 1955 he joined the Archdiocesan College of St. Aloysius, Colombo, with the intention of becoming a Catholic priest. But due to a health condition, on doctor's advice he had to abandon his studies and engage in manual labour.

== Career beginnings ==
While at college, Jayamanne's teachers recognised his love of photography and assigned him to handle the cinema and audio visual equipment in the college. Later he joined the Radio & Electronics Laboratory at Kotahena.

In 1962, he joined Vijaya Film Studios and Laboratories of Cinemas Limited, at Hendala, Wattala. In 1962 he started his career as an assistant cameraman at the Vijaya Studios. As an assistant cameraman and camera-unit in-charge he worked on over 40 feature films, both domestic and international. This gave him the opportunity to work under many cinematographers and to study film laboratory techniques, sound studio work, film editing, production designing and production management.

=== Professional career ===
While working at Vijaya Studios, Jayamanne met Sri Lankan director Titus Thotawatta. In 1970, he left Vijaya to join Thotawatta in the production of Haralaksaya, marking his debut as Director of Cinematography. Jayamanne continued to work as Thotawatta's principle cinematographer through the latter's final film Handaya.

Jayamanne was employed by many other veteran directors, and became a favourite of new directors for their debut projects. His contribution to the films of Dharmasiri Bandaranayake, Vasantha Obeysekera and Parakrama Niriella were highly acclaimed by cinema critics and Journalists of Sri Lanka. In 1972, when the State Film Corporation called for registration of cinema technicians, Jayamanne registered as film director, script writer, cinematographer, film editor and production manager. He is the only person in Sri Lanka to have been registered in five categories.

== Instructor ==
In 1972, Jayamanne was invited to conduct classes for beginners interested in cinema and television at the Paul VI center, Fort, Colombo, organised by the OCIC Sri Lanka. He started training with Super 8 format and slide show programs. Then as VHS came to industry it was introduced to beginners. He held two short film festivals with his students at Sri Lanka Foundation Institute.

In 1983 Jayamanne had the opportunity to attend a professional video program training offered in Taipei by Santa Clara University. Jayamanne was subsequently called up by the Television Training Institute, Sri Lanka to train video technicians for Rupavahini and ITN, the two national television channels. The courses were later extended to train video teams of the Army, Navy, Police, Education, Agricultural, health, and many other government institutes.

In 1986 Andrew Jayamanne was commissioned to train the staff of ITN network studios. During this course several practical programs were produced. The long-running ITN serial Kopi Kade is an offshoot of these training classes. "Kopi Kade" drama was designed to be a low cost a multi-camera production by shooting and editing on line within few hours.

Jayamanne organised another 6 months course for "Television Program Production Training Institute" for Media Centre at Deans Road, Colombo. Six of these programs were conducted.

During 1992 and 1993, Jayamanne was retained as a visiting lecturer at Sri Jayawardanapura University and Sri Lanka Foundation Institute, Colombo.

He extended the video production training classes to remote areas like Trincomalee (three programs), Horuwpatana (one program) and Negombo (two programs). These were conducted as one week full-time courses. The students were trained to use available still or mobile phone cameras for creating short films.

In 2002 he was called up by the Vietnam Television channels workers forum to conduct a workshop in Saigon.

== Filmography ==
=== Producer and director ===
- Cigarette Butt [සිගරෙට් කොටය] (1971) (35 mm short): represented Sri Lanka at the 1971 Popoli Film Festival
- Documentary film (1971) (35mm short) on the visit of Pope Paul VI to Sri Lanka. [හය වන පාවුලු පාප් තුමාගේ ලංකා ගමන]
- Flower in Bloom [පිපෙන කුසුම] (1973)(Super 8 short): presented at the 1973 OCIC Short Film Festival in Manila
- Behind the Cinema of Sri Lanka (1983) A documentary on making of Sri Lankan films. Produced by OCIC Sri Lanka (45 minutes / 35mm /B&W)
- Life of Joseph Vass [සාන්තවර ජෝසප් වාස් ජීවන චරිතය] (40 minutes / 35mm documentary), produced for Government Film Unit of Sri Lanka

=== Cinematographer ===
Director name	Film(s)
Titus Thotawatta	Haralakshaya [හාරලක්ෂය] 1971; Athithayen kathawak [අතීතයෙන් කතාවක්] 1972; Sihasuna [සිහසුන] 1974; Mangala [මංගලා] 1976; Sagarika [සාගරිකා] 1974; Maruwa Samaga Vase [මරුවා සමග වාසේ] 1977; Handaya [හඳයා] 1979
Vasantha Obeysekara	Palagatiyo [පලගැටියෝ] 1979
Parakrama Niriella	SiriMadura [සිරි මෑදුර] 1989
Dharmasiri Bandaranayake	Hansa Wilak [හන්ස විලක්] 1980; Thunveni Yamaya [තුන්වෙනියාමය] 1983; Suddilage Kathawa [සුද්දිලාගේ කතාව] 1985
Jakson Anthony	Julietge Bhoomikawa [ජුලියෙට්ගේ භුමිකාව] 1998
H. D. Premaratne	Mangala Thaegga [මඃගල තෑග්ගය] Sayelama [සෙයිලම] 1995; Visidela [විසි දැල] 1997
Mohan Nihas	Yasoma [යසෝමා] 1997; Eka Malaka Pethi [එක මලක පෙති] 2006
Wimal Ranjith Fernando	Sathipooja [සතිපූජා] 1984
Christy Shelton Fernando	Thahanam Gaha [තහනම් ගහ] 2002; Aragalaya [අරගලය] 1994; Indrakeelaya [ඉන්දකීලය] 2000
Ranjith Kuruppu	Pavna Raluviya [පවන රලුවිය] 1994
K.A.W. Perera	Dhawala Pushpaya [ධවල පුෂ්පය] 1994
Cyril Wickramage	Sihina Lovak [සිහින ලොවක්] 1972
Domi Jayawardana	Singapooru Charlie [සිංගප්පූරු චාර්ලි] 1972
S.G. Samarasinghe	Aasa [ආසා] 1976

=== Television director ===
- Kopi Kade [කෝපි කඩේ] (ITN channel; 56 episodes) Jayamanne served as the inaugural director of this long-running Sri Lankan serial.

=== Television producer ===
- Gama Witthi [ගමේ විත්ති]: Rupavahini (12 episodes)
- Dharmadhikaranaya [ධර්මාධිකරණය]: ITN channel (52 episodes).
- Sanathana Kathandara [සනාතන කතන්දර]: Rupavahini (6 episodes)
- Siri Nivesa [සිරි නිවස]: Sirasa channel (6 episodes)
- Sasala Ruwa [සසල රුව]: Swarnavahini channel (22 episodes)
- Chala Achala [චල අචල]: Swarnavahini channel (22 episodes)
- Rankira Sooya [රන්කිර සොයා]: Swarnavahini channel (22 episodes)
- Damayanthi [දමයන්ති]: Awaiting release (20 episodes)

=== Miscellaneous ===
- Technical director of Sudu Salu [සුදු සලු] 2002 (digital to film)
- Videographer of Sammy Povel's Music Garden 1992 (digital to film)

== Awards and recognition ==
=== Cinematographer awards ===
- Haralakshaya [හාරලක්සය] 1979 – SIGNIS Award; Critics cinema award
- Handaya [හඳයා] – SIGNIS Award; President's cinema awards
- Mangala [මංගලා] – Critics cinema awards
- Maruwa Samaga Vase [මරුවා සමග වාසේ] – Critics cinema awards
- Palagatiyo [පලගැටියෝ] 1979 – Sarasaviya Best Cinematographer Award; President's cinema awards
- Siri Madura [සිරි නිවස] – Sarasaviya Best Cinematographer Award; President's cinema awards
- Hansa Wilak [හන්ස විලක්] – Critics cinema awards
- Thunveni Yamaya [තුන්වෙනි යාමය] – Sarasaviya Best Cinematographer Award; President's cinema awards
- Suddilage Kathawa [සුද්දිලාගේ කතාව] – Critics cinema awards
- Julietge Bhoomikawa [ජුලියෙට්ගේ භුමිකාව] – SIGNIS Award; Critics cinema awards
- Sayelama [සෙයිලම] 1993 – President's cinema awards
- Sathipooja [සතිපූජා] – President's cinema awards

=== Other recognition ===
- Jayamanne is a member in the advisory board of the religious programs in Rupavahini / ITN and Sri Lanka Broadcasting corporation.
- Jayamanne was honoured as "Kala Suru" by The Cultural Guild of Sri Lanka Catholic Organization.
- Jayamanne was appointed as "Justice of Peace – All Island"
- In 1985 and 1986 Jayamanne was invited to attend the International Film and Teachers Seminar organised by the CDG of Germany in Mannheim.

== Personal life ==
Married in 1972 To Bernadette Tissera. After marriage they moved to Eattukala, Negombo. They had 3 sons:

- Asith Chaminda Jayamanne 1973
- Dulip Lasantha Jayamanne 1975
- Susith Eranda Jayamanne 1982

His wife died in 1990 after a long battle with cancer.

A felicitation ceremony was held to commemorate the 50th anniversary of his service to the cinema and Television industry, at the Russian Cultural Institute, Colombo, on 16 March 2012.

== Notes ==
^α Also anglicised as Andrew Jayamanna
