= Mercy Edirisinghe =

Sri Lankan actress, singer and comedian (1927-2009)

Mercy Edirisinghe මර්සි එදිරිසිංහ
- Born: Donna Mercy Nalini Edirisinghe; December 18, 1945; Ambepussa, Sri Lanka
- Died: March 17, 2014 (aged 68); Gampaha, Sri Lanka
- Education: Pamunuwila Roman Catholic College; St. Joseph's College; Rambukkana Parakrama Mixed School
- Occupations: Actress, Comedian, Singer
- Years active: 1964–2012
- Spouse: Lalith Kotalawela

Donna Mercy Nalini Edirisinghe (18 December 1945 – 17 March 2014) was a Sri Lankan actress in cinema, theater and television as well as a singer. She is also notable for her roles in numerous comedic television shows and radio dramas, such as the Vinoda Samaya radio program. She began her singing career in 1964 with the Nawaka Madala song contest and became a stage actress in 1966. Her most notable stage appearance was in Tharavo Igilethi, a musical by Lucien Bulathsinhala. Composed by Gunadasa Kapuge, "Made Lagina Tharawan", from the soundtrack of the play, became her most successful single.

== Personal life ==
She was born on 18 December 1945 in Wellahenawatte, Issanpita, Ambepussa as the third child in a family of nine siblings. Her father Don Lorenzo Elvin Edirisinghe, worked as a typesetter at the printing press of the Department of Examinations. Her mother Grace Perera was a housewife. She was first educated at Ambepussa Sarasavi College, later at Pamunuwila Roman Catholic College and at St. Joseph's College, Rambukkana Parakrama Mixed School in Kegalle. She had one elder sister: Gert, one elder brother: Leo, four younger sisters: Ranjani, Nimal, Lathika, Raaji and two younger brothers: Nimal and Sunil.

Her late husband, Lalith Kotalawela was a Buddhist from Kalutara. The couple had no children. Her devotion to her fans was such that just after her wedding she acted in the stage drama 'Muthu Kumari' at the Lumbini Theater on her way to her honeymoon. Lalith died in 2002 by a tragic accident. Mercy once started a restaurant in Warakapola with Lalith in the year 2000. After his death she became ill, unable to sustain the restaurant.

== Death ==
Mercy had been ill for some time since 2012. She first developed a urinary tract infection. She then underwent a surgery to remove a tumor that had formed in the abdomen. Two years prior to her death, she underwent gynaecological surgery, and had been suffering from numerous hip and back pains since then. She had heart disease as well as diabetes. In addition developed a kidney infection. She died at a private hospital in Gampaha on 17 March 2014, aged 68. Her remains were laid to rest at the Art Gallery from 4 pm on 17th to 12 noon on 18th. In the afternoon, a special motorcade took her to her residence in Ambepussa, Warakapola. Funeral services were held at 3.00 pm on 19 March 2014 at the Ambepussa Roman Catholic Cemetery.

== Career ==
Her first stage performance was in the play Maria Kurenthi performed while at the Pamunuwila Catholic Mixed School at the age of 7. Under the guidance of Father Ernest Poruthota, she participated in the church choir team, where she became an activist in the movement. Father Poruthota invited her to perform in the play Eldiyen Midi Rasata. Mercy entered the public stage in 1967 with Welikadaratne's plays Aluth Dawasak and Ugurata Hora. Meanwhile, she mastered the singing and playing by musician Jayatissa Alahakoon and Kandyan dance by mastering theatrical dance. Then she sent a postcard to a drama acting vacancy advertisement in the 'Visithura' newspaper. With that, she was selected for the play Nil Katarolu produced by Sugathapala de Silva, particularly due to her loud screamy voice. After a brilliant performance in the play, she was later invited to play a role of Japanese-Chinese woman in the play 'Thaththa' produced by Gunasena Galappaththi. According to Mercy, the most difficult play she acted in was Nalin Wijesekera's play Tikki Tikiri Tikirilia.

In Pathiraja L.S. Dayananda's play Kwuruth Enne Na, she played an old character. She also performed in Sugathapala de Silva's plays Harima Badu Hayak, Dunna Dunu Gamuwe, Hitha Hoda Ammandi, Muthu Kumari, Thuraga Sanniya; Gunasena Galappaththi's plays Sanda Kinduru, Mudu Puththu; Prema Ranjith Tilakaratne's play Muhunu Sayaki Rookadayaki. However, her most notable stage drama acting came through the plays Tharavo Igilethi by Lucien Bulathsinhala and Ran Kanda by Chandrasena Dassanayake. In 1974, Mercy won the Best Actress Award at the State Drama Festival for her role in R.R. Samarakoon's stage drama 'Idama'. She won two other Best Actress awards in 1975 and 1976.

In 1976, she made her maiden cinematic appearance with the film Walmathwuwo directed by Vasantha Obeysekera. Then she acted in many comedy and dramatic roles in the films: Diyamanthi, Paḷagæṭiyō Sakvithi Suvaya, Nuvan Rēṇu, Mutu Mæṇikē, Okkoma Rajavaru, Hondīn Nættam Narakin, Hita Honda Puthek, Asayi Bayayi and Dhavala Puṣhpaya. Mercy was also an 'A' grade radio dramatist who acted in Buddhist, Christian literary dramas.

Mercy was a very popular voice in Sri Lankan radio drama. She was the "Doolittle" on the radio drama Handiya Gedara and was the sister of Jane in Vajira, "Ungu" on Samanala Bedda, "Ethana" in Muwan Palessa and "Bagalawathi Iskola Hamine" in Rasara. Apart from radio, she acted in several television serials, particularly in comedic roles. She made a notable role in the popular comedy sitcom, Vinoda Samaya along with comedy trio - Annesley Dias, Berty Gunathilake and Samuel Rodrigo in 1983. Mercy last played in Lilantha Kumarasiri's serial Amanda with the character "Podi Nona".

In 2014, she marked her 50th anniversary of her career and in recognition of her service to the arts, she was to be honored with a Lifetime Achievement Award at the 2014 State Drama Festival. Before her death, her autobiography was released titled "Hela Hasa Rajina: Mercy Edirisinghe" written by Niranjala Hemamalee Wedikkara.

=== Stage drama ===
- Ugurata Hora Beheth
- Ran Kanda
- Seelavathi
- Vishwa Sundari
- Muthu Kumari
- Tharavo Igilethi
- Idama
- Dunna Dunu Gamuwe
- Allapu Gedara
- Dewlo Doni

=== Radio ===
- Muwanpelassa
- Vajira
- Samanala Bedda
- Handhiye Gedara
- Vinoda Samaya

=== Music albums ===
- Gayay Mercy Gee
- Mala Watakara Bambara Rena

== Filmography ==
- No. denotes the Number of Sri Lankan film in the Sri Lankan cinema.

Year	No.	Film	Role
1976	342	Diyamanthi	Gune's wife
1979	417	Palagatiyo	Soma Akka
1979	435	Nuwan Renu	Convent nun
1984	606	Muthu Menike	
1989	688	Okkoma Rajawaru	
1990	704	Hodin Naththam Narakin	
1990	714	Hitha Honda Puthek	
1991	725	Asai Bayai	
1994	801	Dhawala Pushpaya	Boarding owner
1994	808	Mawubime Weerayo	
1995	828	Deviyani Sathya Surakinna	June
1996	847	Raththaran Malli	
1997	871	Puthuni Mata Wasana	Nalika
2017	1286	Sellam Nethnam Lellam	Posthumous release
