= Bawa Karma =

Bawa Karma භවකර්ම
- Directed by: Dharmasiri Bandaranayake
- Written by: Dharmasiri Bandaranayake
- Produced by: Samadhi Films
- Starring: Swarna Mallawarachchi; Jackson Anthony; Ravindra Randeniya
- Cinematography: Lal Wickramaarchchi
- Edited by: Senaka Navaratne
- Music by: Gunadasa Kapuge
- Distributed by: Fifth circuit
- Release date: 5 September 1997
- Country: Sri Lanka
- Language: Sinhala

Bawa Karma (Sinhala: භවකර්ම) is a 1997 Sri Lankan drama film directed by Dharmasiri Bandaranayake and co-produced by Ven. Vijayapura Pagngnananna Thero and Jayaratne Wadduwage for Samadhi Films. This film is the sequel of Bawa Duka. It stars Swarna Mallawarachchi, Jackson Anthony and Ravindra Randeniya in lead roles along with Kamal Addararachchi and W. Jayasiri. Music composed by Gunadasa Kapuge. It is the 886th Sri Lankan film in the Sinhala cinema. The film won a Special Jury Award for Direction and the Presidential Award for Best Screenplay.

== Plot ==
The family continue their existence with Nona Hami the sole breadwinner. Her lost son Giran, who was believed to have drowned, appears one day with a pastor who had saved his life and is taking care of him. Giran, who calls himself Graham now, helps his family and village. The other children grow up. Muhandiram will finally meet his end at the hands one of Nona Hami's children.

== Cast ==
- Swarna Mallawarachchi as Nona Hami
- Jackson Anthony as Peduru
- Ravindra Randeniya as Muhandiram
- Hemasiri Liyanage as Nona Hami's father
- Kamal Addaraarachchi as Appu
- Suvineetha Weerasinghe as Arachchi hamine
- Shyamalie Perera as Bema Nona
- Miyuri Samarasinghe as Peduru's mother
- Rohana Beddage as Dance teacher
- Priyantha Wijeekoon
- W. Jayasiri
- J.H. Jayawardena
- Somy Rathnayake
- Simon Navagattegama
- Neil Allas
- Janaka Kumbukage
- Nilmini Buwaneka
- Ishool Jowzee as child artist
