= Nilmini =

Nilmini (Sinhala: නිල්මිණි) is a feminine given name. Notable people with the name include:

- Nilmini Buwaneka (fl. 1997), Sri Lankan actress
- Nilmini Tennakoon (born 1965), Sri Lankan actress
