= Gunadasa Kapuge =

Sri Lankan musician (1945–2003)

Gunadasa Kapuge ගුණදාස කපුගේ
- Born: Ellamulla Kapuge Gunadasa; August 7, 1945; Elpitiya, Sri Lanka
- Died: April 3, 2003 (aged 57); Colombo, Sri Lanka
- Education: Eeramulla Junior College; Karandeniya Central College; Nagoda Vidyalaya, Galle; Dharmasoka College
- Alma mater: Haywood School of Music; Bhatkhande Music Institute
- Occupations: Singer, composer, playback singer
- Spouse: Prema Vithanage (m.1978)
- Children: 3 including Mithra Kapuge, Ridma Kapuge
- Parents: Ellalamulla Kapuge Francis (father); Dona Alice Nona Siribaddana (mother)
- Relatives: Premawardhana Kapuge (brother)
- Musical career
- Genres: Pop; soul; rhythm and blues; Country music
- Instruments: Vocals, Tabla, Sitar
- Years active: 1963–2003
- Labels: Ransilu; Torana; Tharanga

Ellamulla Kapuge Gunadasa (Sinhala: ගුණදාස කපුගේ; 7 August 1945 – 3 April 2003) popularly known as Gunadasa Kapuge, was a Sri Lankan singer, musician, music director and playback singer. He was well known among Sri Lankans due to the philosophical background of his music renditions and lyrics selected for his work.

== Personal life ==
Kapuge was born on August 7, 1945, in the tiny village of Thanabaddegama in Elpitiya. His father was Ellalamulla Kapuge Francis and mother was Dona Alice Nona Siribaddana. Being the second of eight siblings, he attended Karandeniya Central College up to grade five and the latter part at Dharmasoka College in Ambalangoda, where he initially studied science before switching to music. His brother, Premawardhana Kapuge is also a singer.

He married Prema Vithanage in 1978. The couple had one son: Mithra, and two daughters: Ridhma and Sajani. His son Mithra Kapuge, and his brother, Premawardhana Kapuge sing his songs to continue his legacy.

== Music career ==
In 1963, he left Haywood college of music (presently known as University of the Visual and Performing Arts), where he was studying at that time, to follow a degree course in India. In late 1960, Kapuge joined the Sri Lanka Broadcasting Corporation and in 1969, he worked as an operational assistant and in 1975 started out as a program producer.

Kapuge's initial release was titled "Daesa Nilupul Thema" in 1973, which he sang for a cultural program was aired on SLBC. It later became an instant hit and made his mark in the career. After which, Kapuge was quoted as a 'Grade A' vocalist by the Radio Ceylon. Thus the three decade long music career of Visharada Kapuge began. He appeared as a film background singer as well as a music director and stage play music director. The first stage drama for which he provided background music was "Thuranga Sanniya" by Sugathapala De Silva. Since then he provided background music for the highly popular musical "Tharawo Igilethi" by Lucien Bulathsinhala and several others. His first movie background music gig was for Stanley Perera's "Sandha."

In 1973 following his marriage, he lost his job due to political revenge. He was invited to an international youth conference in Havana, Cuba, applied for a leave of absence from the Sri Lanka Broadcasting Corporation, but his request was rejected for political reasons. However, Kapuge decided to attend the Youth Conference in Havana on July 22, 1978. On his return to Sri Lanka after attending the summit, the SLBC officials delivered a letter to Kapuge at the Bandaranaike International Airport stating that he has left the service. Although he regained his job in 1979, he was arrested the same year on charges of insulting the then Prime Minister Ranasinghe Premadasa. But Kapuge was able to be released during the investigation into the allegations. He is again expelled from the Sri Lanka Broadcasting Corporation. Although he was re-employed with the intervention of the then Chairman of the SLBC, Eman Kariyakarawana, Kapuge was transferred to the Rajarata Service of the Sri Lanka Broadcasting Corporation. In 1981, Kapuge served as the Head of the Music Division of the Rajarata Service and later as the Head of the Rajarata Service. During the 88/89 riots, he did not change his attitude, where he was sent on compulsory leave from Rajarata Sevaya on January 29, 1990.

Meanwhile, in 1980, Kapuge released his first music compact cassette titled "Dhampatin Laa Sandha" featuring Malani Bulathsinhala. Kapuge staged a one-man musical show titled "Kampana" first staged at Lumbini theatre on August 25, 1990, and also released a cassette and CD with the same title. The show was a historical advent of the Sinhala music industry. In a short span of two years, Kapuge performed nearly a thousand "Kampana" shows across the country, and in some cases had to extend the two hour concert to three hours at the request of the audience. He also made popular top selling cassettes such as "Seethala Sanda Eliye" (1981), "Unmada Sithuvam" (1983), "Piya Satahan" (1990), "Irabatu Tharu" (1999) and "Sanda Ra Sihinaye" (2000). Some of his songs carried meaningful messages to the listeners: specially the song "Bimbarak Senaga Gevasuna" talks about the uprising of Uve Wellassa riot against the British. Then his song "Uthuru Kone Nuba Hinahen" aimed at bringing harmony between Tamil people living in the North with Sinhalese people living in the South of the island.

He sang three songs using the same melody: The first song is "Sondura Numba Lihiniyaka" composed by Ratna Sri Wijesinghe. Based on a similar melody, the song "Sabada Api Kandu Nowemu" was composed by Dharshana Medis. Meanwhile, the melody of the song composed by the poet Abeysinghe, "Rathriya Mama Wemi" is similar to the above melody.

As a playback singer, he first involved in the film Ektam Geya for which he sang the song "Unmadha Situwam". Then he contributed for the films Bawa Duka and Bawa Karma both directed by Dharmasiri Bandaranayake. He also sang the song "Kiyanga Magiya" for Milton Jayawardane's film Bithu Sithuwam. Meanwhile, he made vocals and provided his first theater background music for Sugathapala de Silva's play Thuranga Sanniya. Later he involved with many popular stage plays, such as: Paraputuwo, Nandi Visala, Tharavo Igilethi, Sira Kandawuru and Sath Saha Satha.

== Death ==
On returning from a tour at Dubai, United Arab Emirates, Kapuge had a fall at the Bandaranaike International Airport whilst disembarking from a shuttle bus. He sustained injuries on the back of his head. He was taken to the medical center at the airport at around 4.30 AM where he was given saline. After initial treatment, he was to be taken to the Colombo National Hospital. However, there was no male nurse available to assist. Kapuge later died on 3 April 2003 at Colombo National Hospital at the age of 57.

== Legacy ==
On 7 August 2019, Kapuge Birthday commemoration was held by the Gunadasa Kapuge Foundation for the 13th consecutive year. During the ceremony, a blood donation camp was also held. On 11 September 2015, a lyrical tribute performance titled "Kapugeta Haththawai" by his son Mithra Kapuge was presented by Kapuge Memorial Foundation was commenced at 6.00 pm at the Bandaranaike International Conference Hall.

== Discography ==
Music cassettes

- 1980 - Dampatin La Sanda Basa Yanawa
- 1981 - Seethala Sanda Eliye
- 1983 - Unmada Sithuwam
- 1983 - Mawathe Geethaya
- 1990 - Kampana
- 1990 - Piya Satahan
- 1995 - Mirivedi Sangalalak
- 1998 - Sunflower (1,2,3)
- 1999 - Irabatu Taruwa
- 2000 - Sanda Ree Sihine
- 2000 - Nesena Gee Rasa (1,2)

Stage Plays

- Thuranga Sanniya
- Paraputuwo
- Nandi Visala
- Tharavo Igilethi
- Sira Kandawuru
- Sath Saha Satha
- Sasara Sevanel
- Kampana

Tele dramas

- Gigiri Walalu
- Ayammawaru
- Randoli
- Dolospaya
- Sira Kandawuru
- Parameedam
- Sasara Sevaneli
- Rail Peeli Sanda Maddahana
- Sanda

== Filmography ==
| Year | Film | Roles | Ref. |
|---|---|---|---|
| 1978 | Madol Duwa | Music Crew | |
| 1978 | Kundala Keshi | Playback Singer | |
| 1980 | Ektam Ge | Playback Singer | |
| 1980 | Karumakkarayo | Playback Singer | |
| 1982 | Sanda | Composer | |
| 1982 | Major Sir | Playback Singer | |
| 1983 | Chuttey | Composer | |
| 1983 | Rathu Makara | Composer | |
| 1983 | Chandira | Playback Singer | |
| 1983 | Pasa Mithuro | Playback Singer | |
| 1984 | Kiri Kavadi | Playback Singer | |
| 1984 | Maala Giravi | Composer, Playback Singer | |
| 1984 | Madduma Bandara | Composer | |
| 1985 | Puthuni Mata Samawanna | Composer | |
| 1986 | Asipatha Mamai | Playback Singer | |
| 1994 | Ambu Samiyo | Playback Singer | |
| 1996 | Bithu Sithuwam | Musical director | |
| 1997 | Bawa Duka | Composer | |
| 1998 | Bawa Karma | Composer | |
| 1997 | Visidela | Playback Singer | |
| 2001 | Daru Upatha | Musical director | |
| 2005 | Alu Yata Gini | Playback Singer | |

== Awards ==
1996

- Swarna Sanka Award - Best Vocalist
- Vishwa Prasadini Award
- Sarasavi Awards - Best Vocalist

1997

- Rasa Sangeetha Award - Most Popular Singer
- Presidential Award - Best Playback Singer
- Sarasavi Award - Best Vocalist
- OCIC Award - Creative Music Direction - "Bawa Duka"

1998

- Presidential Award - Best Vocalist

1999

- Sarasavi Awards - Prasada Pooja Award
