= Anula Bulathsinhala =

Sri Lankan actress and singer (1947–2020)

- අනුලා බුලත්සිංහල
- Born: Anula Mendis; September 21, 1947; Madampe, Sri Lanka
- Died: 16 October 2020 (aged 73); Colombo, Sri Lanka
- Resting place: Kanatte Cemetery, Borella; 6.90794°N 79.87748°E
- Occupations: Actress, Singer
- Spouse: Lucien Bulathsinhala
- Children: Harsha Bulathsinhala

Anula Bulathsinhala (Sinhala: අනුලා බුලත්සිංහල, born Anula Mendis (අනුලා මෙන්ඩීස්); 21 September 1947 – 16 October 2020) was a Sri Lankan actress and singer. She was popular for her acting in stage drama, television, and cinema.

== Personal life ==
She married popular dramatist Lucien Bulathsinhala in 1970. The couple has one daughter and one son. Her daughter Indrachapa, is an accomplished opera singer in Vienna. Her son Harsha is also an actor, singer and musician.

== Career ==
At a very young age, Anula saw many stage plays due to his father was being a theatre actor. She was trained in singing by her father during this period. Later she obtained a Diploma in Kandyan Dance during school times. She went India and obtained a Diploma in North Indian Ragadhari Music at the Bhatkhand University in Lucknow. After return to Sri Lanka, she joined Sri Lanka Broadcasting Corporation (SLBC) and became an A-grade singer.

Then she was elected to the 1968 Colombo Sathosa Arts Circle. In the meantime, she was working at the Sathosa head office where she met popular theatre director R. R. Samarakoon. Bulathsinhala made her stage debut in Samarakoon's Ledak Nathi Ledek in 1967. In 1960s, she entered the drama particularly as a radio singer and radio dramatist. Later, she was cast in Premaranjith Tilakaratne's Kontare, which was adapted from West Side Story but set in Sri Lanka. She acted alongside Suvineetha Weerasinghe, Sunethra Sarachchandra, Nawanandana Wijesinghe, Elson Divithurugama, and her husband Lucien.

However, his most notable theatre act came through the play Rathu Hettakari produced by her husband. In the play, she sang the popular song "Dee Kiri Dee Kiri", which later made her mark on Sri Lankan stage. Since then, she performed in many plays: Premaranjith Tilakaratne's Kontharaya, Sri Wickrama, Samarakoon's Charith Dekak, Lucien's Tharavo Igilethi, Dayananda Gunawardena's Madhura Jawanika, Henry Jayasena's Kuveni 'and Prof. Sarachchandra's Mahasara.

On 11 September 2020, she was honoured with Natya Keerthi Award at the State Drama Awards.

=== Popular Sinhala songs ===
- Deekiri Deekiri (දීකිරි දීකිරි)
- Thattu Karanna (තට්ටු කරන්න)
- Bundun Wadina Me Dathin Wedala Kiyannam
- Neinage Suduwa (නෙයිනගේ සූදුව)

=== Film acting ===
- Bawathra - 2005
- Nil Diya Yahana - 2008
- Mahindagamanaya - 2011
- Asandhimitta - 2018
- Goal - 2018

=== Stage plays ===
- Tharavo Igilethi
- Rathu Hattakari
- Madhura Jawanika
- Kuveni
- Mahasara
- Ledak Nithi Ledek
