= Thunveni Yamaya =

1983 film by Dharmasiri Bandaranayake

Thunveni Yamaya තුන්වැනි යාමය
- Directed by: Dharmasiri Bandaranayake
- Written by: Dharmasiri Bandaranayake
- Produced by: Dharmasiri Bandaranayake
- Starring: Wasantha Kotuwella, Indira Jonklas
- Cinematography: Andrew Jayamanne
- Edited by: S. De Alwis
- Music by: Premasiri Khemadasa
- Release date: 28 October 1983
- Running time: 110 minutes
- Country: Sri Lanka
- Language: Sinhala

Thunveni Yamaya (English: Third Part of the Night) is a 1983 black-and-white Sri Lankan drama film directed by Dharmasiri Bandaranayake.

== Plot ==
Percy Peiris (Wasantha Kotuwella) and his new wife, Princy (Indira Jonklas), are on their honeymoon in the wet zone at an isolated guesthouse. There, Percy starts having violent hallucinations in the form of flashbacks every time he tries to be intimate with Princy.

After their short lived and physically devoid honeymoon, Percy and Princy return to Percy's family home where he lives with his half-paralyzed mother. On the way home, Princy asks to stop at a church. Percy obliges then leaves her there and drives off. This is where she meets Father Martin (Winston Serasinghe), who makes sure she gets home safely.

The next morning Father Martin visits the Peiris' house to see Princy. He explains that Percy's odd behavior is either a mental disorder or a bad spirit has entered him. He suggests that Princy gets the old house for bad spirits. The violent emotional attacks escalate—Percy refuses to go to work, and when he finds that Princy has sent their servant, Michael, to watch over him, this sends him into a rage. With no options, Princy turns to Father Michael, who asks that Percy see another priest who specializes in exorcisms.

The apparently successful exorcism encourages Princy to attempt consummating their marriage. The attempt fails, which drives Princy to her mother. Princy asks her mother what she should do about this hurtful and bizarre behavior, and her mother tells her that she can't leave him. Percy realizes that Princy is gone, which triggers violence against his servant Michael. Soon after, Percy goes to the office and ends up setting papers on fire after his secretary makes some well-intentioned jokes about married life. Driving at night, Percy picks up a hitchhiker. The conversation leads to wives and girlfriends, sparking the most violent act—Percy throws the hitchhiker to the backseat, and as the man escapes the car, Percy crashes, breaking his glasses and injuring his eye.

The police find Percy and get him to a hospital. They are able to save his eye. Princy visits him, and the doctor (Simon Navagattegama) tells her that Percy needs to undergo a psychological evaluation before he is released to explain how the accident happened. It is revealed that as a child, Percy walked in on his parents having sex and his father (Gamini Haththotuwegama) beat him severely for it, scarring his psyche and ruining his ability to be intimate with his wife.

Percy and Princy leave the hospital, but he stealthily escapes her watch. She goes home hoping he will show up. Percy ends up at a hotel, drinking with a shady man. He gives him some information and the man shows up at the Peiris' house. He asks to speak to Percy, who obviously is not there, in order to scope out the scene. When Princy asks what he wants, he starts speaking in tongues, putting Princy on edge. It is this final act that allows Princy to decide to leave. As she says goodbye to Mrs. Peiris, Percy comes home.

Percy kills Michael, and starts looking for Princy. He follows images from his hallucinations—a seductive Princy and his younger self—until he comes across his wife hanging from the ceiling. He breaks down. At this, Mrs. Peiris attempts to get out of bed to go to her pained son, but the exerted effort kills her as well.

== Cast ==
- Wasantha Kotuwella, as Percy Peiris
- Indira Abeysena, as Princy Peiris
- Winston Serasinghe, as Father Martin
- Iranganie Serasinghe, as Mrs. Peiris (Percy's Mother)
- Gamini Haththotuwegama, as Mr. Peiris (Percy's Father)
- Ranga Bandaranayake, as Young Percy
- Shane Ebert as Michael
- Granville Rodrigo as Bargoer
- Simon Navagattegama, as Doctor

== Awards ==
- Sarasaviya Awards
  - Best Script Writer
  - Best Music Director
  - Best Cinematography
  - Best Sound Recording
- O.C.I.C. Film Festival Sri Lanka − 1983
  - Special Jury Award for Direction
  - Best Music Director
  - Best Cinematography
  - Best Actor
- National Film Festival − Presidential Awards
  - Best Cinematographer
  - Best Sound Recording
  - Two Special Merit awards For Acting
