= 5th Sarasaviya Awards =

1968 awards festival for Sinhala cinema

- Date: April 25, 1968
- Site: Colombo Girls' College, Sri Lanka
- Directed by: Granville Silva

Highlights
- Best Picture: Sath Samudura
- Most awards: Sath Samudura (8)
- Most nominations: Sath Samudura

Television coverage
- Network: Associated Newspapers of Ceylon Limited

The 5th Sarasaviya Awards festival (Sinhala: 6වැනි සරසවිය සම්මාන උලෙළ), presented by the Associated Newspapers of Ceylon Limited, was held to honor the best films of 1967 Sinhala cinema on April 25, 1968, at the Colombo Girls' College, Sri Lanka. Honorable Prime Minister Dudley Senanayake was the chief guest at the awards night.

The film Sath Samudura won the most awards with eight including Best Film.

== Awards ==
Category	Film	Recipient
Best Film	Sath Samudura	Linus Dissanayake
Best Director	Sath Samudura	Siri Gunasinghe
Best Actor	Sorungeth Soru	Gamini Fonseka
Best Actress	Ransalu	Punya Heendeniya
Best Supporting Actor	Sath Samudura	Edmund Wijesinghe
Best Supporting Actress	Sath Samudura	Denawaka Hamine
Best Script Writer	Sadol Kandulu	Reggie Perera
Best Cinematographer	Ransalu	Sumitta Amarasinghe
Best Editor	Sath Samudura	D. B. Nihalsinghe
Best Sound Effects	Ransalu	Mervyn Rodrigo
Best Music Direction	Sath Samudura	Somadasa Alvitigala
Best Lyricist	Sath Samudura	Mahagama Sekara
Best Male Playback Singer	Sath Samudura	W. D. Amaradeva
Best Female Playback Singer	Sadol Kandulu	Nanda Malini
Most Popular Actor	People's vote	Gamini Fonseka
Most Popular Actress	People's vote	Anula Karunathilaka
Merit Awards	Ransalu	Shanthi Lekha
Merit Awards	Daru Duka	Piyadasa Gunasekera
Merit Awards	Daru Duka	Lilian Edirisinghe
Merit Awards	Ransalu	Anula Karunathilaka
Merit Awards	Ransalu	H.L. Simon

Category	Film
Popular Awards from Reader Vote	Daru Duka
Popular Awards from Reader Vote	Sorungeth Soru
Popular Awards from Reader Vote	Rena Giraw
Popular Awards from Reader Vote	Sadol Kandulu
Popular Awards from Reader Vote	Ipadune Ai
Popular Awards from Reader Vote	Ransalu
Popular Awards from Reader Vote	Sath Samudura
