= Suddilage Kathaawa =

- Directed by: Dharmasiri Bandaranayake
- Written by: Simon Navagattegama
- Produced by: Bandula Gunawardena
- Starring: Swarna Mallawarachchi, Sommie Rathnayake, Joe Abeywickrama
- Cinematography: Parakrama De Silva; Andrew Jayamanne
- Edited by: S. De Alwis; Newton Weerasinghe
- Music by: Premasiri Khemadasa
- Release date: 29 March 1985
- Running time: 145 minutes
- Country: Sri Lanka
- Language: Sinhala

Suddilage Kathaawa (English: The Story of Suddi) is a 1985 Sri Lankan film directed by Dharmasiri Bandaranayake and produced by Bandula Gunawardena. The film was based on the novel by reputed writer Simon Navagattegama, who later adapted the novel for the movie. The film stars Swarna Mallawarachchi in lead role along with Cyril Wickramage, Somy Rathnayake and Joe Abeywickrama in supportive roles. The film received critical acclaim and won the award for the Best Film at 1986 Sarasaviya Awards Ceremony.

== Plot ==
Set in 1958, Suddhi (Swarna Mallawarachchi) is married to a notorious criminal in the village, Romial (Cyril Wickramage), who has been taken into the local jail on suspicion of murder. In the meantime, Suddi depends on various men in the village to provide her provisions by sleeping with them. Some time before Romial comes home, Suddi starts sleeping with Mudalali (Somy Rathnayake), a shrewd businessman from town, and he becomes her main lover and provider.

Romial had been hired by Arachchila (Joe Abeywickrama), the local ex-headman, to kill an unnamed villager. Mudalali is married to Arachchila's only sister, mainly for the respect and the wealth she had inherited. The movie is set in the era of the Grama Niladhari system, which undermines Arachchila's village position, and Mudilali's connection with the new grama niladhari provokes Arachchila.

Muralali informs Avusadaya (Ananda Wijesinghe), a tenant farmer who works on Arachchila's land, of the Paddy Lands Act passed through Parliament in Colombo; this new law would force landowners to share the excess land with the landless. This conversation sets forth the conflict between Arachchila and Avusadaya.

Romial returns from jail to the village. Arachchila hands him over the contract to destroy Avusadaya by killing Peter (Salaman Fonseka), the brother of Avusadaya, with whom he had regular quarrels after he gets drunk. When Romial hesitates to get back to violence, Suddi encourages him to go ahead with the killings. The murder trap ends with the deaths of both Peter and Arachchila.

However, Romial, who commits the murder, regrets this. He decides to help Peter's wife (Nilanthi Wijesinghe), who is left helpless after Peter's death, and remains unaware about his murder. Soon, Peter's wife falls in love with Romial, while Mudalali and Suddi continue with their affair. Peter's wife informs Romial about the affair between Mudalali and Suddi, and the film ends with an enraged Romial killing Suddi.

== Cast ==
- Swarna Mallawarachchi as Suddi
- Cyril Wickramage as Romial
- Somy Rathnayake as Mudalali
- Joe Abeywickrama as Arachchila
- Ananda Wijesinghe as Avusadaya
- Salaman Fonseka as Peter
- Nilanthi Wijesinghe as Peter's wife
