= Dada Ima =

Dada Ima දඩඉම
- Official Poster
- Directed by: Dr. Naomal Perera
- Written by: Dr Naomal Perera
- Based on: Sequel to Dadayama film
- Produced by: Ensquared Entertainment Private Limited
- Starring: Swarna Mallawarachchi; Jackson Anthony; Mahendra Perera; Akila Dhanuddara; Marion Wettasinghe
- Cinematography: Ruwan Costa
- Edited by: Tissa Surendra
- Music by: Nadeeka Guruge
- Distributed by: Scope - LFD
- Release date: 28 April 2023
- Country: Sri Lanka
- Language: Sinhala

Dada Ima (End of The Hunt) (Sinhala: දඩඉම) is a 2023 Sri Lankan Sinhalese drama thriller film directed by Dr. Naomal Perera and co-produced by director himself with Dr. Nishani Fernando for Ensquared Entertainment Private Limited. It stars Swarna Mallawarachchi and Jackson Anthony in lead roles along with Mahendra Perera, Akhila Dhanuddara and Marion Wettasinghe. Music composed by Nadeeka Guruge. It is the sequel to 1985 film Dadayama by Vasantha Obeysekera.

In February 2020, the film won the Golden Fox award at Kolkata International Film Festival for the best maiden direction.

== Plot ==
- PROLOGUE

Rathmalie's tragic story of cheat and deceit which resulted in her untimely death at the hands of her fiancé’, Priyankara, who ran over her in his car, was screened as the award-winning and Internationally acclaimed Sinhala film ‘Dadayama’ (The Hunt) in 1985 in Sri Lanka (Directed by Wasantha Obeysekara). It was based on a true story which took place many decades ago in which the accused was found guilty and sentenced to death by Supreme Court in Sri Lanka.

- ‘Dada Ima’ (End of the Hunt)

Dada Ima is a Sequel Drama genre movie, fictitiously based on 3 decade old ‘Dadayama’ film. After Rathmalie's demise, the custody of their one-year-old son (Ravinath) falls under her sister, Rohini. Rohini without disclosing the truth about his parents to Ravinath, lives with him in Europe after leaving the motherland in 1986. Her reluctance to return to Sri Lanka is governed by her fears and disgust of a haunting past of her sister's catastrophic death. Priyankara, meanwhile, has absconded the legal repercussions by concealing the murder of Rathmalie for 30 years, and was residing in the UK under a false identity. After completing his education there, he now has come back to Sri Lanka as Keerthi Gajanayaka, a well-known President's Counsel.

In the background of these past events, three decades of silence is shattered as Ravinath, who is now a renowned pianist is invited to perform at a concert in Sri Lanka. During his stay, he has a fateful encounter with Keerthi Gajanayake. Ravinath not realizing Keerthi to be his father, confronts him following a dream he sees, which is mixed with some past events of his "mother's" brutal murder. When Rohini understands that Priyankara, aka Keerthi is still alive, she decides to join her "son", with the aims of discovering the truth about her sister's murder, and to hide the malevolent past from Ravinath. ‘Dada Ima’, smoothly unfolds the secrets of the past, and depicts that no one escapes punishment after committing a crime during his lifetime.

== Cast ==
- Swarna Mallawarachchi as Rohini Kekulawela, Rathmali's sister
- Jackson Anthony as Lawyer Keerthi Gajanayake aka Priyankara Jayanath
- Akhila Dhanuddara as Ravinath, Rathmali's son
- Mahendra Perera as Sunil, Keerthi's driver
- Marion Wettasinghe as Dedu, Keerthi's daughter
- Daya Thennakoon as Ravinath's servant
- Nayana Hettiarachchi as Peter's wife
- Dilmin Perera as Kasun, Ravinath's friend
- Chandrasoma Binduhewa as Kekulawela, Rathmali's father
- Chinthaka Vaas as Vehicle seeker
- Arun Dias Bandaranayake as Compere
- Rajasinghe Loluwagoda as Keerthi's henchman
- Nadeeka Guruge as Music director

== Awards ==
The film was awarded the following:

- Golden Fox award for the Best Debut Direction 2019/20 - Calcutta International Cult Film Festival, India
- Best Debut Direction 2020 - Monthly edition - World Film Carnival Singapore
- Finalist 2019/20 - Canadian cinematography awards, Canada
- Finalist 2019/20 - Asian cinematography awards, Philippines
- Nominated 2019 - Rome Independent Prisma awards, Italy
- Nominated 2019 - Florence Film awards, Italy
- Nominated 2020 - NICE International Film Festival
- Best Cinematography - NICE International Film Festival
