= Asandhimitta =

- official poster
- අසන්ධිමිත්තා (Sinhala)
- Directed by: Asoka Handagama
- Written by: Asoka Handagama
- Based on: a novel by Saman Wickramarachchi
- Produced by: Cine Sarasavi Films
- Starring: Nilmini Sigera; W. Jayasiri; Yashoda Wimaladharma
- Cinematography: Channa Deshapriya
- Edited by: Ravindra Guruge
- Music by: Kapila Poogalaarachchi
- Release date: 22 March 2019
- Running time: 98 minutes
- Country: Sri Lanka
- Language: Sinhala

Asandhimitta (Sinhala: අසන්ධිමිත්තා) is a 2019 Sri Lankan Sinhala drama thriller film directed by Asoka Handagama and produced by H.D. Premasiri for Cine Sarasavi Films. It stars Nilmini Sigera and Dharmapriya Dias in lead roles along with W. Jayasiri and Shyam Fernando. Kapila Poogalaarachchi composed the music for the film.

The first special screening was held at Regal Cinema, Colombo.

== Plot ==
A film director receives a telephone call from Asandhimiththa. She requests him to make a movie with her life story. She asks him to give her an appointment to tell her story. The scene shifts to a bus where Asandhimitta and a young Wickramasekara are seated next to each other. Wickamasekara gives her sexual hints to indicate that he is keen to start a relationship with her. He gets down at the same bus stop where Asandhimitta disembarks and becomes her paramour. The story progresses with some hints alluding to the docile nature of Wickramasekara who tries to fit himself into the role of a house-husband. Asandhimitta is a ticket collector at a parking lot and she is subjected to callous remarks over her obese body and her massive weight of 303 lb (137.5 kg). Asandhimitta loses her job and tries to do several odd jobs like exorcist, however she fails. Then she puts an advertisement in a newspaper mentioning that she is going to start an association for helpless women. She and Wickramasekara visit an apparently rich family including two ladies named Madara and Samadara and Wickramasekara tries to deceive the divorced lady in that family. The film reaches its climax when Wickramasinghe strangled the ladies. Asandhimitta is arrested by the police in connection to these three murders and director tried to locate Wickramasekara alian Wicky with the help of Pradeep the landlord of Asandhimitta's house. At the end of the film the audience is informed that Wickramasera is a hallucination of Asandhimitta and the two male character are the younger and older version of the same character. The film ends with the juxtaposition of director cutting his birthday cake with Asandhimitta raised to a noose to execute death penalty by prison officers.

== Cast ==
- Nilmini Sigera as Asandhimitta
- Dharmapriya Dias as Wickramasekara aka Wicky
- W. Jayasiri as Old Wicky
- Shyam Fernando as Film director
- Gayani Gisanthika as Madhaara
- Sandali Handagama as Samadara
- Rukmal Nirosh as Lal
- Pradeep Ramawickrama as Bus conductor
- Anula Bulathsinhala as Old lady
- Yashoda Wimaladharma as Vasanthi
- Rithika Kodithuwakku as Girl in bus
- Widath Weerakon as Eka
- Ahas Dissanayake as Deka
- Shala Amarasuriya as Wicky's wife

== International screening ==
The film has contested in many worldwide film festivals for award categories and international screenings. Special screening of the film in Sri Lanka was held in February 2019 at Tharangani film hall, Colombo. The film has been screened at Jogja-Netpac Asian Film Festival 2019 within Asian Perspectives non-competitive category.

- 23rd Busan International Film Festival - nominated for Kim Jiseok Award.
- 22nd Talin Black Knights Film Festival
