= Nilmini Buwaneka =

Sri Lankan actress, dancer and choreographer

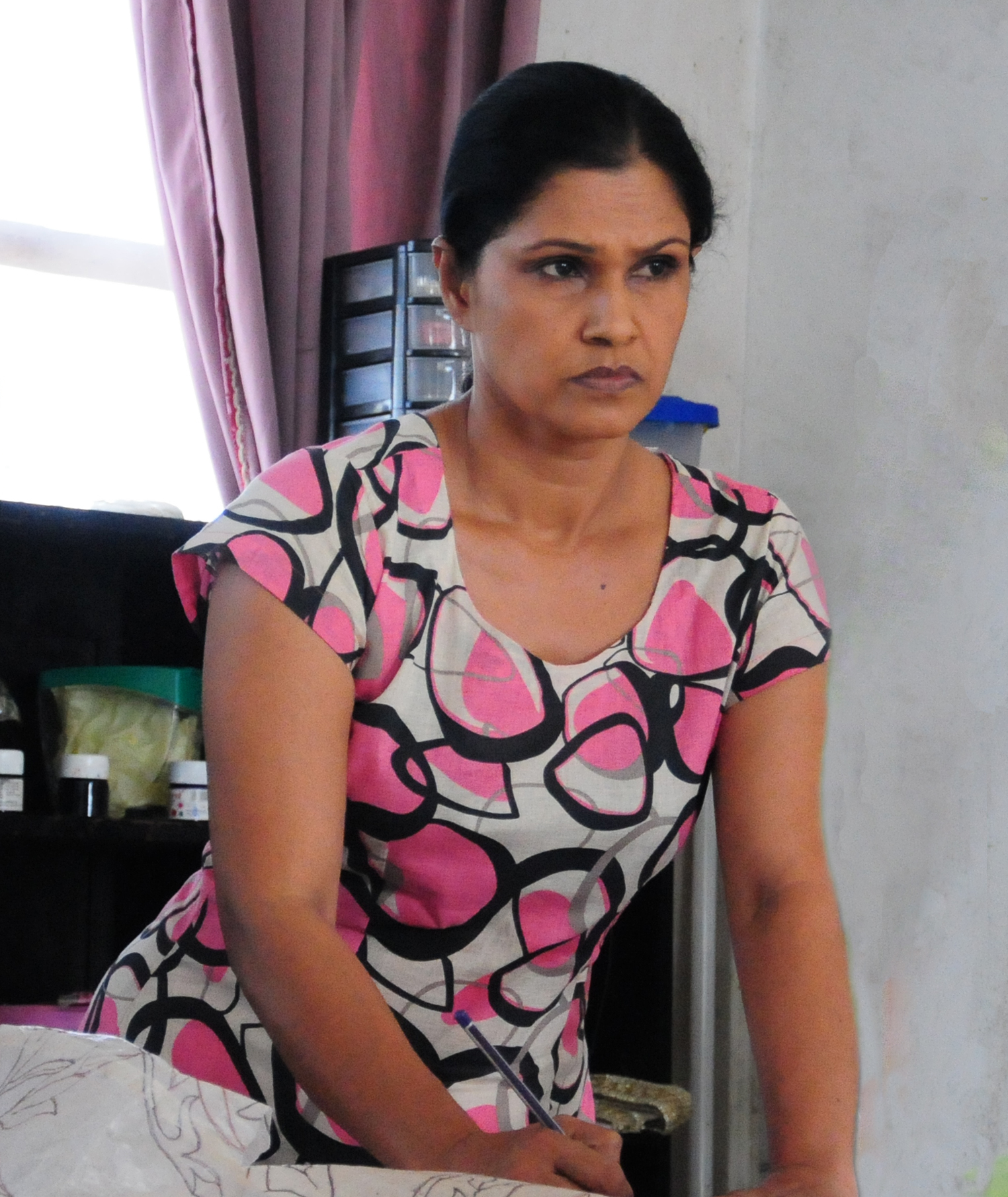
Buwaneka in 2012

Nilmini Buwaneka is an actress, dancer and choreographer from Sri Lanka.

== Dancing ==
She learned dancing in Bhatkhande Music Institute, where she gained a Diploma in Baratha Natyam.

== Theater ==
Nilmini has portrayed many leading roles for the most thriving directors in the drama and theater field of Sri Lanka, and in many non-commercial stage plays such as:

- Ayeth enne ne - Widows
- Dasa Mallige Bangalawa
- Death of a Salesman
- Devadasi (Sinhala and English)
- Doll’s House
- Don Diyego
- Hena – Thunder
- House of Bernada Alba
- Julius Caesar
- Loka
- Makarakshaya
- Manoramya Gee
- Mother Courage
- Reality Show
- Seru
- Sihina Dakinna
- Thatu
- Weeraya Merila

== Television acting ==
Nilmini has acted in a Total of 45 Television serials ranges from drama, thriller to comedy.

=== Selected television serials ===
- Agamehesiyo
- Agni Kankariya
- Alu Pata Heena
- Ambudaruwo
- Anne
- Aparna
- Bhava Tharana
- Bhavathu Sabba Mangalam
- Bumuthurunu
- Chandragrahanaya
- Chathurya
- Dahas Gau Dura
- Dhadayakkaraya
- Duli Pintharu
- Ehi Pillamak Yata
- Hiru Daruwo
- Ira Awara
- Kalpa Kumari
- Mandakini
- Monarathenna
- Nama Veni Kadulla
- Parana Tauma
- Pura Kalani
- Rala Bindena Thena
- Sandakinduri
- Sansare Piya Satahan (Buddhist drama)
- Sansara Prarthana
- Sasara Chakra
- Sath Piyawaru
- Sihina Piyapath
- Sihina Puraya
- Sirakari
- Sitha Nivana Katha (Buddhist drama)
- Sithumina
- Sonduru Piyapath
- Sneha
- Suba
- Suba Sihina
- Sudheera
- Sudui Usai
- Sura Vimana
- Thaksalawa
- Udu Sulanga
- Wanabime Sirakaruwo
- Wankagiriya

== Directing and Choreography ==
Having had the opportunity to work as an Assistant Director alongside Dharmasiri Bandaranayake a Director who marked an era of movie making in Sri Lanka, Nilmini was praised by foreign critics after seeing her own direction of a stage plays using only children with Down syndrome. (Sihina Mal Dangakary, Eka Adipathi, Yakshaya, Sathya)

== Cinema ==
Playing characters in both leading as well as supporting roles in several movies, her distinctiveness remains that of acting only in handpicked special creations of cinema.

Year	Film	Role	Ref.
1997	Bawa Duka		
1997	Bawa Karma		
2009	Ekamath Eka Rateka		
2009	Bindu	Saping's wife	
2014	Samige Kathawa	Sam's mother	
2015	Bora Diya Pokuna		
2020	Paangshu		
2025	Bahuchithawadiya	Sasitha's sister	

== Awards ==
In 2004 she won the State Drama Award Festival(SDAF) for Best Actress in a leading role followed by the award for Best Actress in a Supporting Role at the Sumathi Tele Drama Award Festival in 2008. (State Drama Award for ‘Dasa Mallige Bangalawa’ directed by Ruwan Malith and Sumathi Tele Award for ‘Sudheera’ directed by Benat Rathnayake)
