= Weerawarna =

- Theatrical release poster
- Sinhala: වීර වර්ණ
- Directed by: Shahiru Ranasinghe
- Written by: Shahiru Ranasinghe
- Produced by: Total Films
- Starring: Ravindra Randeniya; Cyril Wickramage; W. Jayasiri
- Cinematography: Kawinda Ranaweera
- Edited by: Anura Bandara
- Music by: Upali Kannangara
- Production company: Randiya Creation
- Release date: 18 March 2016
- Country: Sri Lanka
- Language: Sinhala

Weerawarna (Sinhala: වීර වර්ණ) is a 2016 Sri Lankan Sinhala action mystery film directed by Shahiru Ranasinghe and produced by Ajith Nishantha Kumara for Total Film Productions. It stars Ravindra Randeniya, Cyril Wickramage and W Jayasiri in lead roles along with Douglas Ranasinghe and Veena Jayakody. Music composed by Upali Kannangara. It is the 1246th Sri Lankan film in the Sinhala cinema.

== Plot ==
A group of teenagers, archaeological enthusiast Cyril Wickramage, and professor Ravindra Randeniya teams up to prevent an archaeological theft by a person named Salgadu W. Jayasiri.

== Cast ==
- Ravindra Randeniya as Prasad Madugalla
- Cyril Wickramage as Don Almeida
- W. Jayasiri as Ivan Salgadu
- Douglas Ranasinghe as Ayesha's father
- Veena Jayakody as Suriyasingha's mother
- Gamini Jayalath
- Susantha Chandramali as Ayesha's mother
- Teddy Vidyalankara as Soysa
- Ranjith Rubasinghe as Ranjith
