= Tharavo Igilethi =

Tharawo Igilethi
- Music by: Gunadasa Kapuge

Premiere
- Directed by: Lucien Bulathsinhala

Tharawo Igilethi is a Sinhalese stage drama by Lucien Bulathsinhala, based on the twin brothers story on Bangkok, Thailand This drama is directed and produced by Lucien Bulathsinhala. The play made a comeback after ten years as a new production in 2018. Music is produced by Gunadasa Kapuge.

First staged on July 24, 1981 at Lumbini Theatre, Colombo, the play was popular among the Sri Lankan theatre lovers and shows were staged around the country. The first cast included Vijaya Nandasiri, Neil Alles, Jayalath Manoratne, Jayasiri Chandrajith, Rodney Warnakula, Anula Bulathsinhala, Padmini Divithurugama and Lucian himself.

Harsha Bulathsinhala, Jackson Anthony, Rodney Warnakula, Mercy Edirisinghe, Anula Bulathsinhala are the current actors in this drama.

== Production ==
Lucien Bulathsinhala is producer and writer of the play. The overbooked play however failed mainly due to the cast which left it. Soon “Tharawo Igilethi’ made the second coming with some new faces and was first staged at Nuwara Eliya on April 25, 1982. Once again the popular play went around the country with its evergreen 11 songs like ‘Made Lagina Tharawan’ and ‘Sobawade’ under the musical direction of late singer and musician Visharada Gunadasa Kapuge. The cast that joined for the second production was U. Ariyawimal, Saman Bokalawala, Mercy Edirisinghe, Jackson Anthony together with Rodney Warnakula, Anula Bulathsinghala and Nandasena Hewage who were in the first production. With continuous performance for more than fifteen years and with many shows the play finally came to a halt in 1999.

“Tharawo Igilethi would never make a comeback for the benefit of the present generation if not for the new producers Bandula Ekanayake, Channa Fernando, H. D. Premasiri and Bandara Eheliyagoda,” Lucian told with gratitude to the new producers.

The latest production is played by Harsha Bulathsinhala, Sumith Rathnayake, Niroshan Wijesinghe, Indika Jayasinghe, Piyumi Shanika Botheju, Randima Thilini Perera, Anura Bandara Rajaguru, Ferni Roshini, Mahesh Uyanwatte, Gamini Samarakoon and Rodney Warnakula who was there from the first show of Tharawo Igilethi.

== New Production ==
The latest production is played by Harsha Bulathsinhala, Sumith Rathnayake, Niroshan Wijesinghe, Indika Jayasinghe, Piyumi Shanika Botheju, Randima Thilini Perera, Anura Bandara Rajaguru, Ferni Roshini, Mahesh Uyanwatte, Gamini Samarakoon and Rodney Warnakula who was there from the first show of Tharawo Igilethi.

Incidentally the return of ‘Tharawo Igilethi’ with its popular music direction also coincides with the sixth death anniversary of its music director Gunadasa Kapuge. Behind the screen in the new production are Newton Gunasekara handling stage management, Upali Herath the stage setting, Swineetha Subasinghe as the costume designer, Jerome de Silva as the dance choreographer, Nimal Rajapaksa as the make up and Susantha Nanayakkara and Rohana Hewawitharana in charge of the art direction. The new music arrangements based on Kapuge's original composition were by Harsha Bulathsinhala. Bandula Ekanayake, Channa Fernando, H. D. Premasiri and Bandara Eheliyagoda on behalf of ‘Serenity Creations’ have produced the play.

== Cast ==
- U.Ariyawimal
- Vijaya Nandasiri - In First CAST
- Neil Alles - In First CAST
- Jayalath Manoratne - In First CAST
- Granvil Rodrigo - In First CAST
- Jayashri Chandrajith - In First CAST
- Jackson Anthony - OLD Production Pina
- Mercy Edirisinghe - OLD Production Wije
- Anula Bulathsinhala - OLD Production Lorreata
- Rodney Warnakula - OLD Production Chun Chang
- Harsha Bulathsinhala OLD- Thissa
- Sumith Rathnayake - OLD Jinna
- Niroshan Wijesinghe - Wijaya
- Indika Jayasinghe - OLD Pina
- Piyumi Shanika Botheju - OLD Lorreata
- Randima Thilini Perera - OLD Lorreata
- Anura Bandara Rajaguru - Father
- Ferni Roshini - Lorreata
- Mahesh Uyanwatte - Chun Chang
- Gamini Samarakoon - OLD Jinna
- Savee Alwis- Jinna
- Indika Jayasinghe - Pina
- Lasanduni Jayawardana - wife
- Samitha Sudeeshwara - Thissa
- Newton Gunasekara.OLD
- Rangahala.lk..* Coordinator
