= W. Jayasiri =

Sri Lankan actor (1947–2024)

- ඩබ්ලිව්. ජයසිරි
- Born: 1 May 1947; Galle, British Ceylon
- Died: 22 September 2024 (aged 77); Colombo, Sri Lanka
- Education: St. Thomas' College, Matara Vidyaloka College, Galle
- Occupations: Actor, lyricist, screenplay writer
- Years active: 1966–2024
- Awards: Best Supporting Actor (Presidential Film Awards)

Weerapullige Jayasiri (1 May 1947 – 22 September 2024), popularly known as W. Jayasiri, was a Sri Lankan actor in film, television and on stage, and who also worked as a script writer and lyricist.

== Personal life ==
Jayasiri was born in Hirimbura, Galle on 1 May 1947. He had three brothers. His first school was Kithulampitiya Central Girls' College, before he moved to Matara and studied at Sumangala Vidyalaya. Next he attended St. Thomas' College, Matara until his SSC exam and subsequently attended Vidyaloka College, Galle.

Jayasiri stucied Economics, Indian history and Sinhala at the University of Colombo, where he was the editor of the drama circle. There, he met and befriended fellow actor Sugathapala de Silva.

After working in Saudi Arabia for a few years, he returned and resumed his drama career. He was married and had two daughters with his wife.

== Death ==
Jaysiri died in Colombo on 22 September 2024, at the age of 77.

== Acting career ==
Jaysiri was also a close friend of renowned director Dharmasena Pathiraja, at that time he used to play cameo roles in stage dramas. According to him, he started to play major roles only after he turned 40 years of age. His maiden stage drama acting came through Harima badu Hayak second edition in 1966. He played roles in de Silva's popular stage dramas such as Dunna Dunugamuwa, Muthu Kumari and then in Pathiraja's Eya Dan Loku Lamyek. He became popular with the films Seilama and Visidela, both directed by H. D. Premaratne.

His critically acclaimed stage drama acting came through stage drama Mara Sade in 1985, which is considered a milestone in the Sinhala theater. He is the lyricist of popular film Bambaru Awith. In 2005, Jayasiri translated the television script Sanda Mudunata which was originally written by director Samy Pavel in French.

=== Selected stage dramas ===
- Dunna Dunugamuwa
- Muthu Kumari
- Eya Dan Loku Lamayek
- Dolahak
- Guti Kemata Niyamithai
- Dhawala Bheeshana
- No Return
- Makarakshaya
- Handa Nihanda

=== Selected television series ===
- Adisi Nadiya
- Ado
- Akala Sandya
- Arungal
- Bim Kaluwara
- Dandubasnamanaya
- Dhawala Kanya
- Dambulugala Sakmana
- Gajamuthu
- Girikula
- Haye Pahara
- Idorayaka Mal Pipila
- Kadulla
- Koombiyo
- Kumarayaneni
- Laabai Apple
- Mage Kaviya Mata Denna
- Manikkawatha
- Mini Muthu
- Nagenahira Weralin Asena
- Neela Pabalu
- No Parking
- Nonagathayaka Nimawa
- Ran Kira Soya
- Sadgunakaraya
- Sanda Mudunata
- Sidu as Chief monk
- Sihina Samagama
- Suddilage Kathawa
- Sulanga Matha Mohothak
- Tharu Ahasata Adarei
- Theth Saha Viyali
- Thimiragira
- Thumpane
- Uthuwankande Sura Saradiyel
- Valavettuwa
- Vishwanthari
- Wanawadule Wasanthaya
- Wassana Sihinaya

== Radio plays ==
- Tharuwan Saranai
- Alayaka Damanaya

== As a lyricist ==
The first song "Sulan Hamai Lowa Nalawei" wrote by Jayasiri was recorded in the early 70s for a solo concert by the singer Sanath Nandasiri. The he wrote a song titled "Asuna Wedi Hadak" for the stage play Dhawala Bheeshana produced by Dharmasiri Bandaranayake. In 1978, he worked in the blockbuster film Bambaru Avith and made the critically acclaimed song "Udumbara Hinahenawa" where music composed by Premasiri Khemadasa.

In 1980, he made the lyrics of the film song "Senehasa Pupura" sung by Ivor Dennis for the Bandaranayake's film Hansa Vilak. In the same year, Jayasiri wrote the song "Pawela Pawela" for the film Para Dige, which became the first film song sung by Vijaya Kumaratunga. Other than film songs, he continuously made theme songs for the teledramas, including: "Gamburu Ananthe" for Gal Pilimaya Saha Bol Pilimaya; "Mee Masi Nodeni" for Theth Saha Viyali; "Hankawisiyaka Rali Nagai" for Sulanga Matha Mohothak; "Akasaye Padasayaka" for Bhawanthara; "Tharakawa Dura Dakinna" for Uththamavi and the song "Bonda Wee His Akashaye" for the 1990 popular teledrama Weda Hamine directed by Jayantha Chandrasiri.

In 1995, he composed the song "Lorensoda Almeda" for the film Chitti, where the song was sung by Sunil Perera. Then he made the "Niwena Hina" song for Sangeeth Wijesuriya based on a previously composed melody at the invitation of musician Harsha Ariyasinghe. Other songs he made are: "Muhunuwara Obe Dutuwa" (Kumari Munasighe), "Kola Sithin Desa Wasaaya" (Kaushalya Fernando), "Sathbumu Mahale" (W. D. Amaradeva), "Sihina Sandun Ge" (Bandula Wijeweera), "Biduwen Biduwata" (Amaradeva & Neela Wickramasinghe), "Ira Pena Ira Rashmiya" (Neela Wickramasinghe) and "Thaniwunu Oruwaka" (D.R. Danny).

== Refusal of award ==
In 2018, he refused to attend the Kalabooshana state awards festival to protest the appointment of Mahinda Rajapaksa as prime minister. On social media, he condemned the president, Maithripala Sirisena, and refused an award offered by him.

== Filmography ==
Jayasiri started his film career with a minor role in 1973 film Dahakin Ekak directed by Meril Albert. He contributed to several critically acclaimed films such as Seilama, Wisidela, Bawa Duka, Duwata Mawaka Misa, Sankranthi and Gamani.

| Year | Film | Role | Ref. |
|---|---|---|---|
| 1973 | Dahakin Ekek | Club drunk fighter | |
| 1976 | Diyamanthi | Caldera's thug | |
| 1978 | Bambaru Awith | Micheal | |
| 1980 | Para Dige | | |
| 1980 | Hansa Vilak | | |
| 1981 | Soldadu Unnahe | | |
| 1982 | Ridee Nimnaya | | |
| 1994 | Handana Kinkini | | |
| 1995 | Mee Haraka | Mansoor | |
| 1995 | Seilama | Marcus | |
| 1995 | Chitti | | |
| 1995 | Ayoma | | |
| 1997 | Duwata Mawaka Misa | | |
| 1997 | Bawa Duka | Officer | |
| 1997 | Bawa Karma | | |
| 1997 | Mother Teresa | Mr. Goma | |
| 1997 | Visidela | Gunapala | |
| 1999 | Surangana Yahana | | |
| 1999 | Mandakini | | |
| 1999 | Sathyadevi | Jinadasa | |
| 2000 | Pem Kekula | | |
| 2001 | Daru Upatha | | |
| 2001 | Me Mage Sandai | | |
| 2002 | Sathkampa | Benjamin | |
| 2002 | Arumosam Wahi | | |
| 2002 | Mamath Geheniyak | | |
| 2003 | Thani Thatuwen Piyabanna | Doctor | |
| 2003 | Sudu Kaluwara | Arachchi | |
| 2004 | Mille Soya | | |
| 2007 | Sankranthi | Dr. Gerad | |
| 2009 | Rosa Mal Sayanaya | | |
| 2011 | Gamani | Sumedha, chief monk | |
| 2013 | Abhinikmana | Chief monk | |
| 2014 | Swaroopa | Gregory Samson | |
| 2014 | Que Sera | Ananda | |
| 2014 | Death in a Noble Day | | |
| 2015 | Suhada Koka | Minister Gajanayake | |
| 2016 | Sakkarang | Jeramiyas | |
| 2016 | Weerawarna | Ivan Salgadu | |
| 2017 | Kaala | Wattaka Nilame | |
| 2017 | Aloko Udapadi | Jain Nighantha Giri | |
| 2018 | Punchi Andare | | |
| 2019 | Asandhimitta | Old Wickramasekara | |
| 2019 | President Super Star | Minister | |
| 2020 | Nim Him | | |
| 2020 | Soosthi | Soosa's father | |
| 2022 | Night Rider | | |
| 2023 | Swara | | |
| TBD | Anora | | |
| TBD | Akarsha | | |
| TBD | Elakandiye Marcus | | |
| TBD | Suvisi Vivarana | | |

== Awards ==
He won a Presidential Film Award for the Best Supporting Actor for his role in the movie Duwata Mawaka Misa in 1997.

- Presidential Film Awards

1997 - Best Supporting Actor (Duwata Mawaka Misa)

- Derana Lux Film Awards

2012 - Best Supporting Actor (Gamani)

== See also ==
- Cinema of Sri Lanka
