= Upali Kannangara =

Sri Lankan musician (1951–2018)

- උපාලි කන්නංගර
- Born: 5 January 1951; Colombo, Sri Lanka
- Died: 12 December 2018 (aged 67); Colombo, Sri Lanka
- Occupation(s): Singer, composer, guitarist
- Spouse: Indrani Boteju
- Musical career
- Genres: Pop; soul; rhythm and blues; Country music
- Instrument(s): Vocals, Guitar
- Years active: 1974–2018
- Labels: Ransilu; Torana; Singlanka

Upali Kannangara (5 January 1951 – 12 December 2018: Sinhala: උපාලි කන්නංගර), was a Sri Lankan musician, singer and accompanist. Starting as a guitar player, Kannangara became one of the most popular singers in Sri Lanka particularly in the outdoor musicals with popular songs such as Iwasillak Na Dakina Thura, Dumbara Mitiyawatha, Parata Kittuwa and Gele Ranmala.

== Personal life ==
He was born on 5 January 1951 in Colombo.

In December 2018, he was hospitalized due to a heart condition. He was scheduled to undergo surgery on 3 December, but was postponed due to poor health where both his kidneys and liver worked from machines. He was later transferred to the intensive care unit. On 6 December 2018, he underwent a heart surgery at the Durdans hospital. He died on 12 December 2018 at the age of 67 after the cardiac arrest. His remains were laid to rest at his residence at No. 19 / A, 4th Lane, Jambugasmulla, Nugegoda. Funeral service was held at 4.00 pm on 15 December 2018 at the Kohuwala Public Cemetery.

== Career ==
His career spanned nearly a decade and a half as the lead guitarist of the popular band Super Star led by Ernest Soysa since 1974. During this period, Kannangara and the Super Stars were the leading band of the "Nandana Vindana" monthly concert produced by Jathika Rupavahini as well as "Madu Rasanga" on ITN Networks. The band was the only band to have four music directors namely Ernest Soysa, Sarath de Alwis, Upali Kannangara and Nesan Thiagarajah. They were the first band to be invited twice overseas in 1975 to perform in Kuwait and Bahrain.

In 1990s, he sang a number of memorable songs and was an indispensable singer on the concert stage for decades. Then he moved over to the Super Fortunes band with Keerthi Pasquel and Ernest Soysa. Some of his most popular songs include, Parata Kittuwa, Gele Ranmala Da, Dumbara Mitiyawatha Madde, Iwasillak Na Dakina Thura and Mage Pabawathiye. When he was at peak, he was invited for more than five outdoor musical shows around the country in one day. After that, he stayed away from local music for a while and went abroad. He was also the music director of the popular television serial Isiwara Wedaduru telecast on Jathika Rupavahini. On 10 December 2006, he staged his own musical show 'Swarna Sarani' at the BMICH. During the event, he also launched his second CD "Randoli" which consisted of sixteen tracks, where the music is played by an orchestra conducted by Ernest Soysa who was a last minute replacement for Cheruka Weerakoon.

In 1984, he made playback singing for the comedy film Kakilley Rajjuruwo directed by Tissa Nagodavithana. Apart from singing, he also composed many popular songs for fellow artists, such as Dasa Ridenawa Para Bala Indala (by Milton Mallawarachchi), Adare Sitha Sanasana Adare (by Keerthi Pasquel), Pem Benda Sith Benda and Nelum Vile Kalum Pera (both songs sung by Chandra Kumara Kandanarachchi). On 7 November 2015, The Super Stars Super Concert Musical Extravaganza was held at the Nelum Pokuna theatre, Colombo at 6.30 p.m to mark the reunion of the original members of the band almost after 25 years. In 2016, he became the music director of the film Weerawarna directed by Shahiru Ranasinghe.

== Track listing ==
Parata Kittuwa album included songs
No.	Title	Length
1.	"Parata Kittuwa" (Album Version)	03.52
2.	"Pabawathie" (Album Version)	03.51
3.	"Dumbara Mitiyawatha" (Album Version)	04.47
4.	"Iwasillak Na" (Album Version)	04.35
5.	"Sanda Renu" (Album Version)	03.46
6.	"Mal Wasanthaye" (Album Version)	03.16
7.	"Ganganodare" (Album Version)
8.	"Susum Kandulata" (Album Version (duet with Nirosha Virajini)	04.02
9.	"Nidi Nathi Dese" (Album Version)	03.50
10.	"Parasathu Kusume" (Album Version)	04.07
11.	"Sitha Ninnada Deela" (Album Version)	04.03
12.	"Gele Ranmala Da" (Album Version)	03.41
