= Lasanduni Jayawardana =

Sri Lankan actress, voice actress and lyricist

- Education: University of the Visual and Performing Arts
- Occupations: Actress,voice acting instructor, costume designer, lyricist
- Relatives: Dommie Jayawardena (grandfather)

Lasanduni Jayawardana is a Sri Lankan actress, voice acting instructor, costume designer and lyricist. She has worked in theatre, television, dubbing and voice acting, and has also been involved in theatre production, costume design, translation and arts education.

== Early life and education ==
Jayawardana studied at the University of the Visual and Performing Arts, Sri Lanka, where she obtained a Bachelor of Performing Arts in Drama and Theatre Arts. She also completed a Higher Certificate in Psychology and Counselling at the Native Technology Science & Law Foundation Campus, Sri Lanka.

== Career ==
=== Theatre ===
Jayawardana has performed in stage productions, including:

- Happy Journey
- Tharawo Igilethi
- Punthila
- Girikoota Kashyapa
- Lokka Heluwen
- Sudu Walaha Hiren Pani
- Gewannath Be Gewannath Be
- Garu Katanayakathumani
- Barapathalai Eheth Sthawarai

=== Television ===
She has appeared in Sri Lankan television dramas, including:

- ‘‘Sara’’ (TV Derana)
- ‘‘Malee’’ (TV Derana)
- ‘‘Ahasin Watuna’’ (Swarnavahini)
- ‘‘Giridevi’’ (ITN)
- ‘‘Kiyadenna Adare Tharam’’ (Sirasa TV)
- ‘‘Dhawala Raaksha’’
- ‘‘Wandana’’ (TV Derana)
- ‘‘Nihanda’’ (TV Derana)
- ‘‘Bio’’ – Season 3 (Swarnavahini)

=== Voice acting and dubbing ===
Her work as a dubbing artist for television dramas, films and animated productions includes roles in productions such as ‘‘Isiwara Weraduru’’, ‘‘Janahithakami Rejina’’, ‘‘Hithata Horen’’, ‘‘Sihina Kumara’’, ‘‘Dhaara’’, ‘‘Prema Dadayama 4’’, and the Sinhala film ‘‘Ethalaya’’.

She has also provided voices for animated productions and international films, including ‘‘Kung Fu Panda’’, ‘‘Puss in Boots’’, ‘‘Kung Fu Masters of Zodiac’’, ‘‘Tom and Jerry’’, ‘‘Ice Age’’, ‘‘Garfield’’, ‘‘The Loud House’’, ‘‘Sing’’, ‘‘Dragon Flies’’, ‘‘The Game’’, ‘‘Quakers’’, ‘‘Kubo’’, ‘‘Boss Baby’’, ‘‘Ferdinand’’, ‘‘Guardians of the Galaxy’’, ‘‘Hulk’’, ‘‘Spider-Man’’, ‘‘Iron Man’’, ‘‘The Avengers’’, ‘‘Arthur’’, ‘‘Aliens & Monsters’’, ‘‘Dogmatix’’, and ‘‘Dalia and the Red Book’’.

== Other activities ==
Jayawardana has also worked as a workshop conductor, singer, lyricist, costume designer and dubbing translator.
