= Bora Diya Pokuna =

- Sinhala: බොරදිය පොකුණ
- Directed by: Sathyajith Maitipe
- Written by: Sathyajith Maitipe
- Produced by: Sunil Dharmasiri
- Starring: Kaushalya Fernando; Dilani Abeywardana; Priyanka Samaraweera
- Cinematography: Paalitha Perera
- Edited by: Ravindra Guruge
- Music by: Pradeep Ratnayaka
- Release date: 14 February 2015
- Running time: 141 minutes
- Country: Sri Lanka
- Language: Sinhala
- Budget: රු.8,500,000

Bora Diya Pokuna (Sinhala: බොරදිය පොකුණ) is a 2015 Sri Lankan Sinhala adult drama film directed by Sathyajith Maitipe and produced by Sunil Dharmasiri. It stars Kaushalya Fernando and Dilani Abeywardana in lead roles along with Priyanka Samaraweera and Duminda de Silva. Music composed by Pradeep Ratnayaka. It is the 1222nd Sri Lankan film in the Sinhala cinema.

The film was screened at Smithsonian Institution in Washington on 5 December 2004. The film production was completed in 2003, but banned by the Public Performance Board of Sri Lanka, until it was granted in 2010 for showing in 2015. The film won a special prize for the Best Fiction Film at Honolulu International Film festival, 2005 in Hawaii.

== Cast ==
- Kaushalya Fernando as Ariyalatha / Gothami
- Dilani Abeywardana as Mangala
- Duminda de Silva as Vipula
- Priyanka Samaraweera as Suwineetha
- Dharmasiri Bandaranayake as Desmond
- Veena Jayakody as Doreen
- Rathnawali Kekunawela as Bording mistress
- Rohitha Karunarathna as Sanjeewa
- Chandani Seneviratne as Piyasili
- Leonie Kotelawala as Gothami' mother
- Chandra Kaluarachchi as Desmond's mother
- Gayan Lakruwan as Suranjith
- Pramudi Karunaratne as Taniya
- Sarath Kothalawala
- Nilmini Buwaneka
- Asela Jayakody
- Giriraj Kaushalya
- Jayani Senanayake
