= Swarna Mallawarachchi =

Sri Lankan actress

Swarna Mallawarachchi ස්වර්ණා මල්ලවාරච්චි
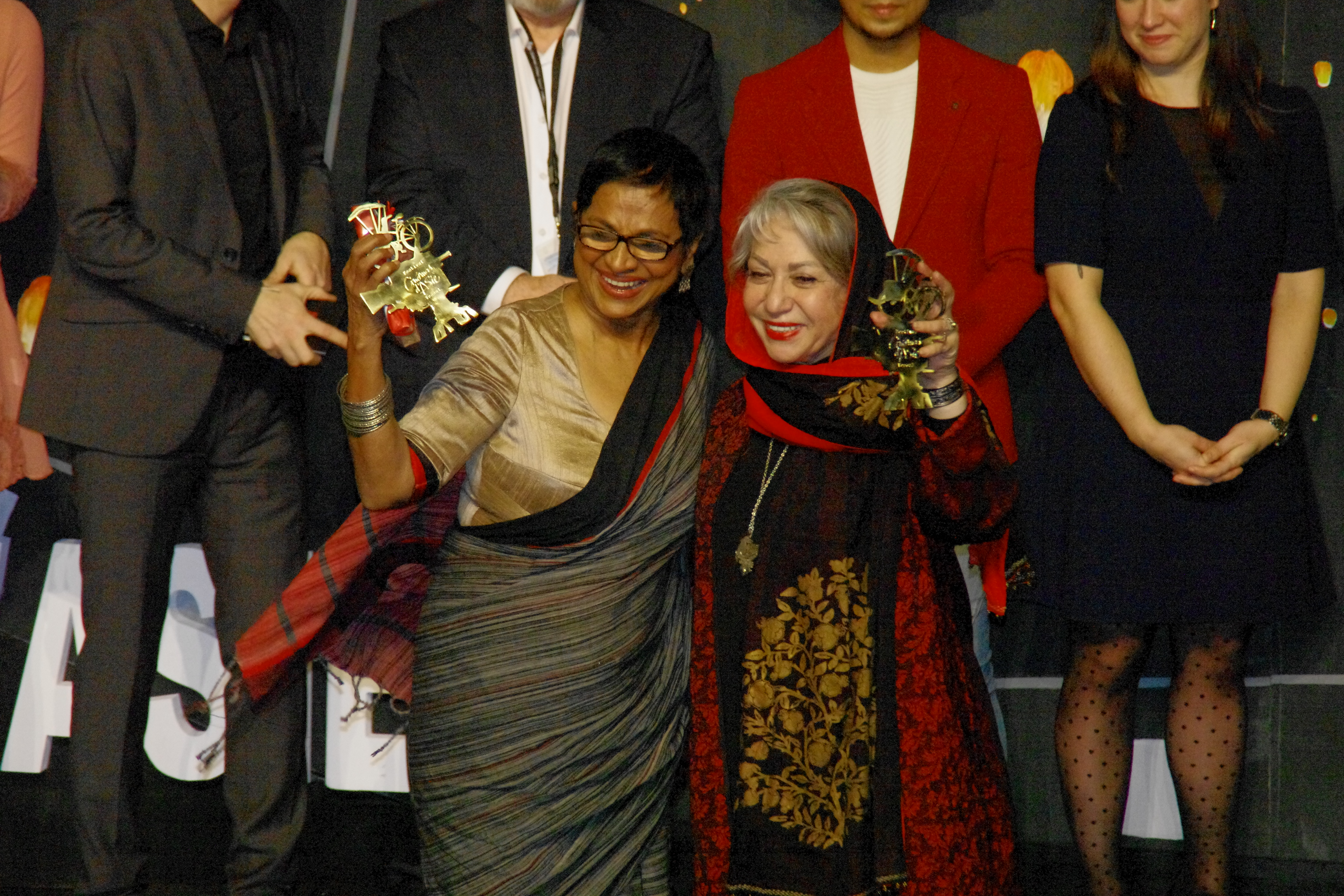
- Swarna Mallawarachchi (left) in 2017
- Born: 1 August 1948 (age 77); Colombo, Sri Lanka
- Education: Vijayaba Maha Vidyalaya
- Occupation: Actress
- Years active: 1966–present
- Children: Narendra Bandaranayake
- Awards: Best Actress

Swarna Mallawarachchi (born 1 August 1948: Sinhala: ස්වර්ණා මල්ලවාරච්චි), is an actress in Sri Lankan cinema. Often known as the "Golden star of Sinhalese cinema", Swarna began her acting career whilst still a schoolgirl, starring in the 1966 blockbuster film Sath Samudura directed by Siri Gunasinghe. During a career spanning over 40 years, Swarna has won the 'Best Actress Award' 26 times, most by a Sri Lankan actress.

== Personal life ==
She was born on 1 August 1, 1948. in Kosgas Junction, Grandpass, Colombo. She completed her education at Vijayaba Maha Vidyalaya, Grandpass..

Swarna has one daughter named Naredra Bandaranayake.

== Career ==
In school, she collaborated with her friend Kanthi Kalyani Atugoda for the handwritten school magazine "Pipena Kumudu." Through the magazine, she showcased her abilities.

Swarna left Sri Lankan cinema for a brief period in the 1970s to live abroad. When she returned after a four-year absence, there was an influx of new actresses. Swarna accepted supporting roles from directors during this period and obtained the Best Actress awards for these roles during these years.

In 1983, she played the main role of 'Ranmali' in the thriller drama film Dadayama directed by Vasantha Obeysekera. After receiving positive reviews by the critics, she won the Best Actress award at the Sarasaviya Awards for the role.

She has been appointed the UNHCR ambassador for women's rights in Sri Lanka since 2004.

Swarna's unique role as an actress is evident in films such as Vasantha Obeysekera's Dadayama (The Hunt) and Kadapathaka Chayava (Reflections in the Mirror), Dharmasiri Bandaranayake's Suddhilage Kathawa (The Story of Suddhi) and Bava Duka / Bava Karma, Sumitra Peries' Sagara Jalaya (Letter Written in the Sand) and Prasanna Vithanage's Anantha Rathriya (Dark Night of the Soul).

== Filmography ==
Year	Film	Role
1967	Sath Samudura	Soma
1969	Hanthane Kathawa	Subhadra
1970	Thunman Handiya	Yasawathi
1970	Nim Wallala	
1971	Samanala Kumariyo Samaga Api Kawadath Surayo	
1973	Mathara Achchi	Sumithra aka Sumi
1973	Gopalu Handa	
1973	Hondama Welawa	
1974	Ahas Gauwa	Vijitha
1980	Muwan Palessa 2	
1980	Sankhapali	Sugala
1980	Hewanali Eda Minissu	
1980	Hansa Vilak	Miranda Ranaweera
1980	Sinhabahu	Supra
1981	Anjana	
1981	Chanchala Rekha	Kamala
1982	Ridee Nimnaya	Leelawathi
1982	Kiri Suwanda	
1982	Kala Mal	
1982	Biththi Hathara	Samara
1982	Yahalu Yeheli	Gina
1983	Dadayama	Rathmali Kekunawela
1983	Samanala Sihina	
1983	Muwan Palessa 3	
1984	Maya	Kumari's mother
1985	Suddilage Kathaawa	Suddi
1985	Doringe Sayanaya	
1985	Karadiya Walalla	
1986	Maldeniye Simion	Gunawathi
1987	Yugayen Yugayata	
1987	Kawuluwa	
1988	Sagara Jalaya Madi Haduwa Oba Sanda	Heen Kella
1989	Kedapathaka Chaya	Nandawathi Bandara
1993	Madara Parasathu	Chithra
1994	Mee Haraka	Yamuna Nanayakkara
1995	Ayoma	Ayoma
1997	Bawa Duka	Nona Hami
1997	Bawa Karma	Nona Hami
1998	Chanda Kinnari	
2001	Anantha Rathriya	Weerasinghe Arachchige Piyumi
2004	Premawanthayo	
2014	Thanha Rathi Ranga	Manorani
2016	Age Asa Aga	
2023	Dada Ima	Rohini Kekunawela
2025	Rani	Manorani Saravanamuttu

== Awards ==
=== Presidential Awards ===
Year	Nominee / work	Award	Result
1981	Hansa Vilak	Best Actress	Won 1984 “ Dadayama” Best Actress
1986	Suddilage Kathawa	Best Actress	Won
1997	Bawa Duka	Best Actress	Won
1998	Channa Kinnari	Best Actress	Won
2017	Age Asa Aga	Best Actress	Won
2017	Contribution to Cinema	Lifetime Achievement	Won

=== OCIC Awards ===
Year	Nominee / work	Award	Result
1982	Ridi Nimnaya; Biththi Hathara; Yahalu Yeheli	Best Actress	Won
1983	Dadayama	Best Actress	Won
1984	Maya	Best Actress	Won
1985	Suddilage Kathawa	Best Actress	Won
1988	Sagara Jalaya	Best Actress	Won
1989	Kadapathaka Chaya	Best Actress	Won
1996	Anantha Rathriya	Best Actress	Won
1997	Bawa Duka	Best Actress	Won
1998	Channa Kinnari	Best Actress	Won
2017	Age Asa Aga	Best Actress	Won

=== Sarasaviya Awards ===
Year	Nominee / work	Award	Result
1983	Dadayama	Best Actress	Won
1985	Suddilage Kathawa	Best Actress	Won
1988	Sagara Jalaya	Best Actress	Won
1997	Bawa Duka	Best Actress	Won
1998	Channa Kinnari	Best Actress	Won
2014	Contribution to Cinema	Lifetime Achievement	Won

=== Swarna Sanka Awards ===
Year	Nominee / work	Award	Result
1988	Sagara Jalaya	Best Actress	Won
1989	Kadapathaka Chaya	Best Actress	Won

=== Hiru Golden Film Awards ===
Year	Nominee / work	Award	Result
2014	Contribution to Cinema	Lifetime Achievement	Won

=== Sumathi Awards ===
Year	Nominee / work	Award	Result
2017	Contribution to Cinema	Lifetime Achievement	Won

=== Derana Film Awards ===
Year	Nominee / work	Award	Result
2017	Age Asa Aga	Best Actress	Won

=== Other Awards ===
Year	Nominee / work	Award	Result
–	Contribution to Cinema	Bangladesh Film Development Board Award	Won
–	Contribution to Cinema	Zonta Woman of the Year	Won
–	Contribution to Cinema	Sanpac Felicitation	Won
