= Cyril Wickramage =

Sri Lankan actor

Cyril Wickramage සිරිල් වික්‍රමගේ
- Born: 26 January 1932 (age 94); Kurunegala Sri Lanka
- Education: Thurstan College, Colombo
- Occupations: Actor, Dramatist
- Years active: 1965–present
- Spouse: Winifreda Perera
- Children: 4
- Parents: Charles Wickrama (father); Lydia Wickrama (mother)
- Awards: Best Supporting Actor

Cyril Wickramage (born 26 January 1932: Sinhala:සිරිල් වික්‍රමගේ) is an actor and director in Sri Lankan cinema, theater and television as well as a singer. Wickramage is known for participating mainly in artistic Sinhala films. Performed as a charismatic actor in all three art forms: stage, cinema, and teledrama, Wickramage is most notable for the dramatic roles in the films, Bambaru Avith, Karumakkarayo, Seilama and Dheewari.

== Personal life ==
Wickramage was born on 26 January 1932 in Kohila Gedera village, Kurunegala, Sri Lanka. His father Charles Wickrama, was a farmer. His mother was Lydia, a daughter of Wel Vidane. Cyril is the fifth sibling in the family with four brothers and four sisters. His father was a dancer and folk drummer in the village. He first walked 9 miles to a school run by the Salvation Army.

At a young age he joined the army but later trained as a teacher at Peradeniya University in 1954. During this time, he joined Cyril Perera's Art Institute in Mulgampola, Kandy to study music and learned to play the violin. As a teacher, Wickramage received posts at Rathmalane Deaf School. While completing his diploma at the University of Sri Jayewardenepura, Wickramage was drawn to acting. During this time, Wickramage met Somawansa Pattiarachchi who worked for the National Broadcasting Corporation and excelled violin for about two years. In the meantime, he was transferred to Wesley College, Colombo.

He is married to Winifreda Perera, the sister of music director and film actor Vincent Premasiri. The couple has two sons: Chandana, Lakshitha and two daughters: Wathsala, Disala.

== Drama career ==
During his tenure in Wesley College, he met Sri Jayana, who worked as the dance teacher of the school. Together they produced the ballet Rana Thisara. Wickramage gained some prestige with his role in Gunasena Galpaththi's play Muhudu Puththu, his maiden acting in stage dramas. He subsequently appeared in Devatha Eliya, Kuveni, Thavath Udasanak, Dawasak Wenas, Elowa Gihin Melowa Awaa, Kada Walallu, Pabawathi, Liyathambara, Natukkaraya, Wes Muhunu, Ahasin Watunu Minissu and Idama. In the play Pabawathi, Wickramage played the role of 'King Okkaka'.

On Sisira Senaratne's invitation, Wickramage made his debut as a film actor in 1965 with a supporting role in the film Handapana. His true breakthrough came however in 1967 with the role of Gunadasa in the groundbreaking Sath Samudura. The film was highly praised in Sri Lanka and swept the 1968 Sarasaviya Film Festival. Wickramage rounded up the 1960s with roles in the art film Mokade Vune and the popular Binaramalee.

In the late-60s, Wickramage began a successful collaboration with Vasantha Obeysekera and producer Dr. Linus Dissanayake. Year 1970 saw the release of the first Vasantha-Cyril-Linus film Ves Gaththo. Dealing with such issues as alienation among rural youth, the film was expanded upon with Walmath Wuvo in 1976. Cyril made his first foray into directing with Dr. Linus in 1972 making Sihina Lowak which he also starred in. The film produced the popular song "Ma Mala Pasu Sohon Kothe" sung by W. D. Amaradeva.

Wickramage was a favorite of Dharmasena Pathiraja, appearing in almost all of his films including Ahas Gauwa, Eya Dan Loku Lamayek, Bambaru Awith, Soldadu Unnahe. The role in Bambaru Awith (1978) in particular was a major role for Wickramage. Other major directors that used Wickramage include Tissa Abeysekera in Karumakkarayo - 1980 and Dharmasiri Bandaranayake in Suddilage Kathaawa - 1985.

Wickramage has expanded into television work with roles in Numba Nadana Senehelatha, Palingu Manike, Andukole, Mihikathage Daruwo, Saapa Nokaraw Daruwane (directed by Rodney Widanapathirana), Gauwen Gauwa and Alle Lange Walauwa.

=== Selected television serials ===
- Andukola
- Bandara Deiyo
- Diya Matha Ruwa
- Ella Langa Walawwa
- Kande Gedara
- Kaneru
- Kota Uda Mandira
- Laa Hiru Dahasak
- Maruk Mal
- Mihikathage Daruwo
- Numba Nadan Senehelatha
- Palingu Manike
- Saapa Nokaraw Daruwane
- Sathya
- Sujatha Puthra
- Udu Viyana

== Filmography ==
Year	Film	Roles	Ref.
1965	Handapana		
1967	Sath Samudura	Gunadasa	
1969	Mokada Une	Paala	
1969	Binaramalee	Singer	
1969	Paara Walalu		
1970	Nim Walalla		
1970	Wes Gaththo		
1972	Sihina Lowak		
1973	Hathdinnath Tharu	Premadasa	
1974	Ahas Gauwa	Cyril	
1976	Walmathwuwo	Saman Weeratunga	
1977	Eya Dan Loku Lamayek	Fighting card dealer	
1978	Selinage Walawwa	Samson	
1978	Bambaru Awith	Cyril	
1979	Dutugemunu	Dutugemenu	
1979	Chuda Manikya	Percy Ranatunga	
1979	Wisihathara Peya	Silva	
1980	Karumakkarayo	Piyadasa	
1981	Soldadu Unnehe	Taxi Malli	
1984	Parasathuro	Ihalagama	
1985	Suddilage Kathaawa	Romiel	
1985	Karadiya Walalla		
1987	Mangala Thegga	Dhamme	
1987	Podi Vijay		
1989	Sirimedura	Albert	
1990	Palama Yata	Solomon	
1991	Sthree		
1992	Kulageya	Honeymoon crasher	
1994	Ekada Wahi		
1994	Ambu Samiyo	Piyadasa	
1994	Mee Haraka	Bus Conductor	
1995	Seilama	Bande	
1995	Maruthaya	Dharmawardena	
1996	Bithu Sithuwam		
1996	Thunweni Aehe		
1997	Blendings		
1998	Sexy Girl		
1999	Nagaran	Minister	
2000	Anuragaye Ananthaya	Dharmasena	
2002	Thahanam Gaha		
2004	Gini Kirilli		
2011	Dheewari		
2014	Que Sera		
2016	Weerawarna	Don Almeida	
2016	Sakkarang	Pitawela Gurun	
2017	Bandhanaya	Menik Hami	
