= Bawa Duka =

Bawa Duka භව දුක
- Directed by: Dharmasiri Bandaranayake
- Written by: Dharmasiri Bandaranayake
- Produced by: Samadhi Films
- Starring: Swarna Mallawarachchi; Jackson Anthony; Somy Rathnayake
- Cinematography: Lal Wickramaarchchi
- Edited by: J. Suranimala
- Music by: Gunadasa Kapuge
- Release date: 30 May 1997
- Running time: 180 minutes
- Country: Sri Lanka
- Language: Sinhala

Bawa Duka (Sinhala: භව දුක) is a 1997 Sri Lankan drama film directed by Dharmasiri Bandaranayake and co-produced by Ven. Vijayapura Pagngnananna Thero and Jayaratne Wadduwage for Samadhi Films. It stars Swarna Mallawarachchi, W. Jayasiri and Jackson Anthony in lead roles along with Ravindra Randeniya and Hemasiri Liyanage. Music composed by Gunadasa Kapuge. It is the 877th Sri Lankan film in the Sinhala cinema. This film has a sequel, Bawa Karma.

== Plot ==
The film is set in 1905 during the British colonial reign in Sri Lanka. Nona Hami is raped by Muhandiram. Peduru Appu marries her without knowing that she is pregnant with Muhandiram's child. The whole village learns about it but Peduru accepts her as his wife irrespective of her state. Many years pass and they have more kids. Nona Hami and Peduru always fight over the eldest child, Giran, who is Muhandiram's child. Giran is forced to jump into the river to escape his father's beatings.

== Cast ==
- Swarna Mallawarachchi as Nona Hami
- Jackson Anthony as Peduru
- W. Jayasiri as Officer
- Hemasiri Liyanage as Nona Hami's father
- Ravindra Randeniya as Muhandiram
- Somy Rathnayake as Arachchi
- Lalitha Sarachchandra as Nona Hami's mother
- Suvineetha Weerasinghe as Arachchi hamine
- Ravindra Yasas as Puramipiya
- Nilmini Buwaneka
- Miyuri Samarasinghe as Peduru's mother
- Rohana Beddage as Dance teacher
