= Visidela =

Visidela විසිදෑල
- Directed by: H. D. Premaratne
- Written by: H. D. Premaratne; Jackson Anthony; Sarath Chandrasiri
- Produced by: EAP Films
- Starring: W. Jayasiri; Anusha Sonali; Jackson Anthony
- Cinematography: Andrew Jayamanne
- Edited by: Elmo Halliday
- Music by: Rohana Weerasinghe
- Distributed by: EAP Theatres
- Release date: 7 November 1997
- Running time: 105 minutes
- Country: Sri Lanka
- Language: Sinhala

Visidela (The Fishing Net) (Sinhala: විසිදෑල) is a 1997 Sri Lankan Sinhala drama romance film directed by H. D. Premaratne and produced by Soma Edirisinghe for EAP Films. It stars W. Jayasiri and Anusha Sonali in lead roles along with Jackson Anthony and Daya Thennakoon. Music composed by Rohana Weerasinghe. It is the 887th Sri Lankan film in the Sinhala cinema.

== Cast ==
- W. Jayasiri as Gunapala
- Anusha Sonali as Sirima
- Jackson Anthony as Nimal
- Daya Thennakoon as Piyadasa, Nimal's father
- Daya Alwis as Keerala
- Grace Ariyawimal as Emilyn, Gunapala's wife
- Robin Fernando as Loku IC Mahathaya
- Razi Anwar as Gamini
- Mahendra Perera as Conductor Sumith
- Ramani Siriwardena as Achala, Inspector's daughter
- Vasanthi Chathurani as Saroja, Inspector's daughter
- Anjela Seneviratne as Inspector's wife
- Pradeep Senanayake as Saroja's friend
- Gnananga Gunawardena as Seargent Somapala

== Soundtrack ==
No.	Title	Lyrics	Singer(s)	Length
1.	"Gumu Gumuwa Wadule"	Sunil Ariyaratne	Samitha Mudunkotuwa
2.	"Biduna Dehen Biduna"	H. D. Premaratne	Gunadasa Kapuge
