= Dadayama =

Dadayama දඩයම
- Torana DVD cover
- Directed by: Vasantha Obeysekera
- Written by: Vasantha Obeysekera
- Produced by: Canfo Films
- Starring: Ravindra Randeniya; Swarna Mallawarachchi; Somy Rathnayake
- Cinematography: Donald Karunaratne
- Edited by: Stanley de Alwis
- Music by: Premasiri Khemadasa
- Release date: 20 May 1984
- Running time: 105 minutes
- Country: Sri Lanka
- Language: Sinhala

Dadayama (The Hunt) (Sinhala: දඩයම) is a 1983 Sri Lankan Sinhala drama thriller film directed by Vasantha Obeysekera and co-produced by Rabbin Chandrasiri, Sunil Jayasiri and P.A Somadasa for Canfo Films. It stars Ravindra Randeniya and Swarna Mallawarachchi in lead roles along with Somy Rathnayake and Iranganie Serasinghe. Music composed by Premasiri Khemadasa. It is the 558th Sri Lankan film in the Sinhala cinema.

== Cast ==
- Ravindra Randeniya as Jayanath
- Swarna Mallawarachchi as Rathmali Kekulawala
- Somy Rathnayake as Jacolis
- Iranganie Serasinghe as Brothel owner
- Rathnawali Kekunawela as Rathmali's mother
- Shirani Kaushalya as Renuka
- Nanda Withana as Duplicate registrar
- Malaka Chathurath as Rathmali's son
- Daya Alwis as Minister
- Granville Rodrigo as Peter's companion
- J.H. Jayawardana as Peter
- Awanthi Aponsu as Rathmali's friend
- Rathmali Gunasekara as Rathmali's elder sister
- Anushi Wijegunawardena as Prostitute
