= Karandeniya Central College =

School in Sri Lanka

G/Karndeniya Central College (National School)
- ගා/කරන්දෙණිය මධ්‍ය මහා විද්‍යාලය (ජාතික පාසල); கா/கரன்தெனிய மத்திய கல்லூரி (தேசியப் பாடசாலை)

Location
- Karandeniya; Sri Lanka
- Coordinates: 6°16′22″N 80°05′45″E

Information
- Type: Education in Sri Lanka#Government School
- Motto: පඤ්ඤා නරානං රතනං
- Established: 1943
- Founder: P.D.S. Kularathne
- Principal: Captain S.P. Ariyarathne
- Staff: 200
- Grades: Class 6–13
- Gender: Boys & Girls
- Age: 11 to 19
- Enrollment: 3000
- Colours: Maroon and Yellow

Karandeniya Central College is a high school situated in Galle District of Southern Province of Sri Lanka. It is one of the first Central Colleges in Sri Lanka.

The main building was declared open in 1953 by the Minister of Education M. D. Banda. The College is one of the early schools that offered science education in Sinhalese the language spoken by about 75% of Sri Lankans in Sri Lanka. Two students qualified to enter the University of Ceylon in science in Sinhalese medium from the first batch of graduates, in 1961. They are now university professors (Mangala de Silva and H.G.Nandadasa). The next batch produced one civil engineer - (Buddhi/Buddhadasa Meegasdeniya who now lives in Canada) who entered the University of Ceylon and later opted to accept the offer from the Education Department to enter Moscow University and one science graduate (Dhanasiri Silva). The third batch produced one engineer (M.K.N.Kumararatne) who studied at the University of Sri Lanka, one doctor (Nimal Jayaweera) who studied in East Germany and one science graduate (P.A.Jayawardena Yapa) who is a university professor now. Thereafter hundreds of students got admission to various universities in Sri Lanka and abroad from the Sinhalese programme. At present it could become one of the best colleges in southern province. Generally it is providing more than 50 student for Sri Lanka Universities per year.

Karandeniya Central College was established under the free education concept introduced by then Hon. Minister of Education Dr. C. W. W. Kannangara. This was one of the 54 Central Colleges established all over the Island under the program to groom under-privileged people in very rural areas. This was an opportunity for the sons and daughters of farmers, cinnamon cultivators and laborers. By staying true to the objective which it was established, large numbers of children entered the universities and found other avenues to transform themselves as better citizens. Personalities who helped the development of the College include Mr. T. D. Samarawera, who became the principal of the College twice. He was one of the old boys of the College who was born in Karandeniya.
