= Dommie Jayawardena =

Sri Lankan actor and singer

Dommie Jayawardena ඩොමී ජයවර්ධන
- Born: June 25, 1927; Ambalangoda, British Ceylon
- Died: 28 December 1979 (aged 52); Colombo, Sri Lanka
- Occupations: Film Actor, Singer
- Years active: 1953-1979
- Spouse: Nona Subeida (m. 1947)
- Children: Roy Jayawardena (Son); Nihal Jayawardena (Son); Nalini jayawardena (Daughter)
- Relatives: Lasanduni Jayawardana (Grand Daughter) Buddhini Jayawardena (Grand Daughter) Harsha Jayawardena (Grand Daughter)

Dommie Jayawardena (25 June 1927 – 28 December 1979 as ඩොමී ජයවර්ධන in Sinhala) was a Sri Lankan actor and singer. He achieved fame playing villainous roles including Bollywood film Praan.

== Personal life ==
Dommie Jayawardena was born on 25 June 1927 in Ambalangoda. He died on December 28, 1979, at the age of 52.

Dommie was married to Nona Subeida and the couple has two sons, one daughter - Roy and Nihal, both were actors. Subeida has acted in two films - Sujatha and Rekava.

Elder son Nihal was born on 4 March 1949. Nihal acted in about 27 films. He died on 25 August 2004. Youngest son Roy was born in 1957 and died on 24 May 2001. He has acted in 16 films. Nihal Jayawardena' Daughter Lasanduni Jayawardana, has also acted in stage plays and work as a dubbing artist. She is continuing her career in dubbing and acting under the name "actone".

== Cinema career ==
He first appeared on the silver screen in Sujatha (1953) as the womanizer Wickie. Jayawardena would go on to make over 50 films. Samiya Birinda Deviya featured one of his rare sympathetic performances.

Jayawardena directed two films, Daru Duka and Singapore Charlie.

A Dommie Jayawardena Commemoration Day was held at the John de Silva Memorial Hall Colombo on January 8, 2000.

== Filmography ==
Year	Film	Role	Other roles
1953	Sujatha	Wickie	Playback Singer
1954	Radala Piliruwa	Charlie Hamu	
1954	Warada Kageda		
1955	Seda Sulang	Eddie	
1956	Duppathage Duka		Playback Singer
1957	Soorasena	Robert Hamu	
1958	Samajaya		
1958	Deyyange Rate		
1959	Sihinaya	Gunapala / Dommie Jayawardena / Mr. Jayasena	Playback Singer
1960	Subhadra		Playback Singer
1961	Kurulu Bedda		
1962	Suhada Divi Piduma	Douglas	
1963	Sudu Sande Kalu Wala	Perakadoru Mahthaya	
1964	Kala Kala De Pala Pala De		
1964	Suba Sarana Sepa Sithe		
1964	Semiya Birindage Deviyaya	Husband Nimal	
1964	Samaje Api Okkoma Samanai	Gurunnanse	
1965	Sepatha Soya	Jeevan	
1965	Sathutai Kandului		
1965	Hathara Maha Nidhanaya	Dharmawardena Hamu	
1965	Hithata Hitha		
1965	Chandiya		
1966	Sudu Duwa		
1966	Layata Laya		
1967	Magul Poruwa		
1967	Hathara Kendare		
1967	Daru Duka	Loku Mahathaya 'Sir'	Director
1967	Amathaka Unada		
1968	Ruhunu Kumari		
1968	Akka Nago		
1968	Hangi Hora		
1969	Kawuda Hari	Perakadoru Mahathaya	
1970	Dan Mathakada	Dommie	
1970	Athma Pooja		
1971	Kalana Mithuro		
1972	Singapore Charlie		Director
1972	Hathara Wate	Dhammika	
1974	Lasanda	Edward Jayawansa 'Hamu'	
1974	Hadawath Naththo		
1976	Wasana	Newton	
1976	Deviyange Theenduwa	Heenkenda Jayapala Mahathaya	
1976	Hariyata Hari	Doctor	
1977	Sudu Paraviyo	Advocate	
1977	Sajaa		
1977	Hithuwoth Hithuwamai	Adrian Pinto	
1979	Hingana Kolla	Marcus Almeida	
1979	Divi Thibena Thura	Bertie 'Mahathaya'	
1979	Monarathenna	Sydney	
1979	Anusha	Victor	
1980	Tak Tik Tuk	Detective	
