= Sath Samudura =

1967 film by Siri Gunasinghe

- Directed by: Siri Gunasinghe
- Produced by: Linus Dissanayake
- Starring: Swarna Mallawarachchi; Cyril Wickramage; Denawake Hamine
- Cinematography: D. B. Nihalsinghe
- Edited by: D. B. Nihalsinghe
- Music by: Somadasa Elvitigala
- Release date: 2 February 1967
- Country: Sri Lanka
- Language: Sinhala

Sath Samudura (English language, "Seven Seas") is a landmark Sri Lankan film directed by professor Siri Gunasinghe and released in 1967. This film was critically acclaimed and is considered a major work in Sri Lankan cinema.

It depicts the plight of fishermen living in the Southern Province of Sri Lanka.

== Cast ==
- Cyril Wickramage as Gunadasa
- Denawaka Hamine as Karolina, Gunadasa's mother
- Edmund Wijesinghe as Sirisena
- Swarna Mallawarachchi as Soma
- Leena Fernando as Wimala
- Hemamali Gunasinghe as Sophie 'Nona'
- Rathnawali Kekunawela as Wimala's mother
- Somasiri Dehipitiya as Peter
- Bertie Kirthisena
- Sumitra Rajasinghe
- Sirimathi Rasadari

== Music ==
The score for the movie was composed and directed by Somadasa Elvitigala. Unlike popular films of the time, only a few songs were included and these were of sombre and austere quality. W. D. Amaradeva served as the vocalist.

== Reception ==
The film was a huge critical success within Sri Lanka.

At the 1968 Sarasaviya Film Awards, the film took home Best Film, Best Director, Best Male Film Role (Edmund Wijesinghe), Best Female Film Role (Denawaka Hamine), Best Film Editing, Best Music Direction, Best Lyricist (Mahagama Sekera — "Sinidu Sudu Mudu Thalawe") and Best Male Singer (W. D. Amaradeva — "Sinidu Sudu Mudu Thalawe").

In 1997, it was named one of the Top Ten films of the first 50 years of Sri Lankan cinema.
