= Lucien Bulathsinhala =

Sri Lankan dramatist

Lucian Bulathsinghala ලූෂන් බුලත්සිංහල
- Born: Raigama Bulathsinhalage Lucian Perera; 30 May 1942 (age 84); Maradana, Sri Lanka
- Education: Dharmaloka College; Dehiwala Central College
- Alma mater: University of Peradeniya
- Occupations: Actor, dramatist, director, poet, playwright
- Years active: 1967–present
- Spouse: Anula Bulathsinghala
- Children: Harsha Bulathsinhala
- Parents: Martin Perera (father); Jane Nona (mother)
- Awards: Kala Suri; Kalabhushana

Kalabhushana Kala Suri Raigama Bulathsinghalage Lucian Perera (born 30 May 1942, Sinhala: ලූෂන් බුලත්සිංහල), popularly known as Lucian Bulathsinghala, is an actor and director in Sri Lankan cinema, theater, and television. Considered one of the iconic figures in Sinhala theater and television, Lucian Bulathsinghala has produced several critically acclaimed theater plays in a career spanning for more than five decades. His stage play Tharavo Igilethi is considered a hallmark in Sinhala theater history. Apart from acting, he is a versatile character who performed as director, poet, playwright and lyricist.

== Personal life ==
He was born on 30 May 1942 in coastal village Wedikanda in Ratmalana, Sri Lanka. His father Raigama Bulathsinghalage Martin Perera was a dedicated socialist. His mother Senarath Godage Jane Nona was a housewife. He has three brothers and two sisters. He went to Dharmaloka College in Ratmalana for primary education. Then he attended to Dehiwala Central College for secondary education and passed the A/L examination in 1963. Later he graduated from University of Peradeniya. At that time, he passed the clerical examination and took over as the only clerk at the Ambewela Government Farm.

He was married to fellow actress Migel Hewage Anula Mendis. Lucian met her when he went to act in Ranjith Tilakaratne's play Konthare. Anula made her acting debut in 1967 with the stage play Ledak Nathi Ledek produced by R. R. Samarakoon. Then she appeared in several critically acclaimed stage plays such as Tharavo Igilethi, Rathu Hattakari, Madhura Jawanika, Kuveni, Mahasara in which some were made by Lucien himself. She died on 16 October 2020 at the age of 73. The couple has one daughter Indrachapa Bulathsinghala (born 1970) and one son Harsha Sanjeewa Bulathsinghala (born 1971). Harsha is also an actor, singer and musician who acted in several popular television serials.

== Career ==
During school times, he joined with Shanthi Faculty of Peace Arts and studied drama under Joseph Perera. He was the one who recognized Lucian's talents and first used him for an adult play where he played the character of a child begging on the street with his mother in poverty. After passing SSC exam he joined the Government Institute of Fine Arts where he passed the exam. He studied arts for a brief period at the institute and later quit due to commercial problems.

While still in school in the 1960s, he was fortunate enough to play the lead role Saliya in a tragicomedy play Ashokamala directed by the then examination commissioner L. L. K Gunasekara which was performed at the Lumbini Theater. During the same time, he made his maiden stage production Mannadiya. In 1964, he wrote the play called Noniwena Gini which took it to the State Drama Festival. In 1966, he performed in the Bihiwana Bosathaneni produced by Bandula Jayawardena and received a merit award at State Drama Festival. In the meantime, his play Noniwena Gini was invited to perform at the 1966 State Drama Festival as a guest play. He then acted in Ediriweera Sarachchandra's play Elova Gihin Melowa Ava. He also worked as a flutist in the orchestra of the play Pematho Jayathi Soko.

In 1974 he produced the stage play Rathu Hattakari which became a popular play and critically acclaimed at several award festivals. In 1974 State Drama Festival, the play won the awards for the Best Script writing, Best Music, Best Actor and Best Acting. In 1981 he produced the popular stage play Tharavo Igilethi which made him one of the best dramatists in the country. The first performance of the play was on 24 July 1981 at Lumbini Theater. After 37 years of silence, he produced the stage play Ves Muhuna Galawanna in 2018.

In the meantime in 1971, he served as an announcer at Sri Lanka Broadcasting Corporation (SLBC) and later joined Jathika Rupavahini. In 1990, he was fired from the public service. After working in the Ministry of Transport for 11 years and then in the Sri Lanka Broadcasting Corporation, he got the opportunity to work in the Rupavahini Corporation from 25 November 1982. It was in the midst of many setbacks that he got to work in television. In the meantime, he was suspended and again got a job at a television corporation. But once again he was sent on compulsory leave in 1997.

In 1980, he made his first songwriting with the song "Sandun Sihina Mandapaye" which was sung by Nanda Malini. In 1989, he won both Swarna Sankha and Sarasaviya Awards for the song "Marana Thunak Athi Minisa" for the film Siri Medura. Meanwhile, in 1994, he won the Swarna Sankha Award for the song "Gopalu Was Danden" for the film Mee Haraka. Then in 1998, he won the Presidential Award for Best Lyricist for the song Noselai Divi Makulu Asa made for the film Gini Avi Saha Gini Keli.

He is also a stage playwright as well as a stage actor who has demonstrated his acting skills on stage with the plays: Wahalak Nati Geyak, Dunna Dunugamuwe and Harima Badu Hayakdirected by Sugathpala De Silva. In 1967 he made cinema debut with the film Sadol Kandulu directed by Reggie Perera. He later played a prominent role in Vasantha Obeysekera's film Ves Gattho. Then he played the role of 'Frederick', the a gem robber in the film Chuda ManikyayaHe also played a prominent role in Abha directed by Jackson Anthony. However recently his best performance came through the blockbuster film Ho Gaana Pokuna where he played the role of village principle.

In 2017, he was honored with National Honors, even though he was forced to turn return home due to the lack of parking space. In 2018, he was honored at Presidential Awards. In 2019, The Janabhimani or Hela Maha Rawana Rajabhimani Awards Ceremony was held at the Jasmine Auditorium at the BMICH where Bulathsinghala won the Best Service Award.

=== Stage plays ===
- Mannadiya - (1963)
- Noniwena Gini - (1966)
- Rathuhattakari - (1974)
- Tharavo Igilethi - (1981)
- Sanda Langa Maranaya - (2009)
- Vesmuhunu Galawanna - (2018)

=== As a lyricist ===
- Ahasin Tharuwak Kada Wetenawa
- An Nage Sal Aththe Pankiriththa
- Dangakari Man Madduma Doni
- Deekiri Deekiri
- Dethola nokee dea
- Dham Patin La Sanda
- Kadeta Palayan Chun Chan
- Kanyawe
- Kolom Thota Natha Mahaluwee
- Made Lagina Tharawan
- Me Ganga Me Duru Katara Gewa
- Minini Pode La Adure
- Mutu Kuda Ihalana
- Osari Poten Adinnepa
- Pani Kurullane Nil Kobeiyane
- Pinibara Yame
- Pipunu Male Ruwa Emala Danido
- Raja Maduraka Ipadi Sitiyanam
- Sande Ahasa Wage
- Sobawade Mepura
- Soduru Minisa
- Siri Yahane
- Sudu Nanda Ai
- Tharu Mal Yayama
- Thattu Karanna Hemin
- Viduli Mini Pahan
- Yasa Isuru Pirunu Thena
- Mage Malai
- Ada

=== Author work ===
- Pipuna Male Ruwa - 1985
- Khemadasa Nyaya Bhawithaya Saha Aragalaya - 2000
- Sinhala Opera Dekak - 2004
- Tharawo Igilethi - 2004
- Mathaka Dawa Halu kala Noheka (The Autobiography)

== Filmography ==
Year	Film	Role	Ref.
1967	Sadol Kandulu		
1970	Ves Gaththo		
1973	Hathdinnath Tharu	Card dealer	
1979	Chuda Manikya	Frederick Ranasinghe	
1980	Dandu Monara	Samarapala	
1980	Hansa Vilak	Lyricist	
1981	Aradhana		
1982	Chathu Madhura	Lyricist	
1982	Situ Diyaniya	Cyril Randeniya, Lyricist	
1983	Siw Ranga Sena	Lyricist	
1984	Kiri Kawadi	Basil, Lyricist	
1984	Mala Giravi	Lyricist	
1985	Puthuni Mata Samawenna	Lyricist	
1989	Siri Medura	Lyricist	
1992	Kulageya	Lyricist	
1996	Seema Pawuru	Lyricist	
1998	Gini Avi Saha Gini Keli	Lyricist	
1998	Julietge Bhumikawa	Lyricist	
2004	Randiya Dahara	Lyricist	
2008	Aba	King Abhaya	
2008	Ai Oba Thaniwela	Lyricist	
2008	Nil Diya Yahana	Lyricist	
2014	Siri Daladagamanaya		
2015	Ho Gaana Pokuna	School principal	
2017	Heena Hoyana Samanallu		
2023	Ksheera Sagaraya Kalabina		

=== Selected television series ===
- Appachchi
- Daskon
- Hopalu Arana
- Kalu Kurulla
- Kinnara Damanaya
- Kula Kumariya
- Laa Sanda Pamula
- Muthu Palasa
- Natu Nethi Mal
- Pinsara Dosthara
- Punchi Walawwa
- Rathu Ahasa
- Sihina Sappuwa
- Siri Sirimal
- Sudu Kapuru Pethi
- Thunmanthenna
- Wishwanthari

== See also ==
- Sri Lankan literature
