= Simon Navagattegama =

Sri Lankan writer (1940–2005)

Simon Navagattegama සයිමන් නවගත්තේගම
- Born: September 15, 1940; Navagattegama, British Ceylon
- Died: October 9, 2005 (aged 65)
- Education: Scholarship to Central College Anuradhapura : Universities of Peradeniya, Vidyodaya and Kelaniya; (did not finish at Peradeniya or Vidyodaya)
- Occupations: Sinhala novelist, playwright and actor.
- Political party: LSSP (youth wing)...afterwards generally anti-establishment
- Spouse: Mallika Navagattegama
- Children: Sunny Nawagaththegama, Maya Nawagaththegama, Kumara Kashyapa Navagattegama, Suranimala Sudharshana Navagattegama, Ayesha Navagattegama

Simon Navagattegama [also spelled Nawagattegama] (September 15, 1940 – October 9, 2005) was a Sinhala novelist, Sinhala Radio Play writer, playwright and actor.

He is well known for his novel "Sansararanye Dhadayakkaraya" (Hunter in the wilderness of the Sansara) for its magical realism which is influenced by Buddhist mythologies, Mahayana Buddhist concepts and Freudian and Jungian psychoanalysis.

== Literary style ==
K. K. Saman Kumara, a literary critic and writer in Sri Lanka, calls Simon as the predecessor of magical realism in Sri Lanka and calls his literary style as a Buddhist Borgesian one. Saman Kumara terms the Simon's Literature as the ‘Buddhist Wisdom Literature’, taking it as a separate genre, which is unique to Sri Lanka. He compares Simon's Literary endeavor to the philosophical attempts of Erick Fromm, who tried to merge Buddhism, Marxism, and Freudian psychoanalysis. Malinda Seneviratne, who translated the Simon's novel Sansararanyaye Dadayakkaraya (Hunter in the wilderness of the Sansara) into English, says that it "was an important literary landmark and Simon is one of the best writers in Sinhala in the second half of the last century." Deepthi Kumara Gunarathna, has identified ‘Hunter in the wilderness of the Sansara’ as a novel which shows a postmodernism unique to Sri Lanka.

K. K. Saman Kumara recognizes Simon Navagaththegama as one of authors, which he calls as the ‘Modernist Trinity’ in Sinhala Literature, Tennyson Perera and Ajith Thilakasena among others.

== Works ==
=== Books ===
- Ohuge Kathawa (ඔහුගේ කතාව)
- Saagara Jalaya Madi Handuwa Obasanda [Short Story collection] (සාගර ජලය මඳි හැඬුවා ඔබ සන්දා)
- Saahithyaya, Samajawadaya saha kala vicharaya
- Suddhilage Kathawa (සුද්දිලාගේ කතාව)
- Sansaranyaye Dadayakkaraya [Hunter in the Wilderness of Sansara] (සංසාරාරණ්‍යයේ දඩයක්කාරයා)
- Sansaranyaye Urumakkaraya (සංසාරාරණ්‍යයේ උරුමක්කාරයා)
- Sansaranyaya Asabada (සංසාරාරණ්‍යය අසබඩ)
- Dadayakkarayage Kathawa (දඩයක්කාරයාගේ කතාව)
- Saankawa (සාංකාව)
- Sapeshani (සාපේක්ෂණී)
- Ksheera Sagaraya Kalabina (ක්ෂීර සාගරය කැලඹිණ)
- Himalaya tharanaya kala Arjuna kumarayage Kathava
- Wanaraya
- Acharya Bryan De Cretser, Ohy saha ohuge adahas
- Kalawa, Samajawadaya saha Kala Vicharaya
- Bawanawa (බාවනාව)

=== Film scripts ===
- Suddilage Kathaawa
- Siri Medura
- Sagara Jalaya Madi Haduwa Obasanda
- Seilama
- Shieera Sagaraya Kelabina (production of the movie delayed due to the cost involved)

=== Radio play ===
- Wanaraya

=== Stage drama ===
- ගංඟාවක්,සපත්තුකබලක් සහ මරණයක්1970
- Puslodan 1973
- Suba saha Yasa 1974 (සුබ සහ යස)
- Sthrii (woman)
- Sudu saha Kalu
- Pandukhabaya
- gagana sarana kurullane 1971
