= Somy Rathnayake =

Sri Lankan actor

Somi Rathnayake සොමී රත්නායක
- Born: Somy Nanda Ratnayake; October 27, 1946 (age 79); Sri Lanka
- Occupations: Actor, Producer, Screenplay writer
- Years active: 1975–present
- Spouse: Susila Ratnayake
- Children: Dilan Ratnayake Naveen Ratnayake

Somi Nanda Ratnayake (born October 27, 1946, as සොමී රත්නායක [Sinhala]), also known as Somi Ratnayake, is a Sri Lankan actor in Sri Lankan cinema, stage drama and television. With a career spanning more than four decades, he has also taken on other roles including working as a script writer and film producer.

== Career ==
Ratnayake directed the stage drama Ran Salakunu.

== Filmography ==
Rathnayake started his film career with 1975 film Amaraneeya Adare directed by Dayananda Jayawardane. Then he contributed to several critically acclaimed films such as Suddilage Kathawa, Surabidena, Sathkampa, and Parawarthana.

=== As actor ===
Year	Film	Role	Ref.
1975	Amaraneeya Adare		
1975	Ganga		
1976	Hulawali	Village vendor	
1976	Sikuru Dasawa		
1977	Yakadaya		
1978	Selinage Walawwa	Robert	
1978	Kumara Kumariyo	Somy	
1978	Anupama	Piyadasa	
1979	Samanmalee	Ruby	
1979	Wasanthaye Dawasak	Piyadasa	
1979	Sugandhi		
1979	Subhani		
1979	Amal Biso		
1980	Uthumaneni	Baby Mahaththaya	
1980	Miyurige Kathawa		
1980	Jodu Walalu		
1980	Doctor Susanthaa		
1980	Sasaraka Pethum		
1980	Dandu Monara	Peiris	
1980	Muwan Palessa 2	Dingirala	
1980	Sankhapali		
1981	Walampuri	Cheviar Mudalali	
1981	Bandura Mal	Sanaa	
1981	Thawalama		
1981	Ranga	Bonnie's friend	
1981	Sasara Pera Nimithi	Mr. Lawrence	
1981	Sagarayak Meda	Security Guard	
1981	Ridee Thella		
1981	Sathara Diganthaya		
1982	Sakwithi Suwaya	Kasana	
1982	Wathura Karaththaya	Sampath	
1982	Miss Mallika		
1983	Samuganimi Ma Samiyani		
1983	Niliyakata Pem Kalemi	Samson	
1983	Thunhiri Mal		
1983	Senehasaka Kandulu	Poramola	
1983	Hasthi Wiyaruwa	Dawula	
1983	Sister Mary	Hamu	
1983	Monara Thanna 2		
1983	Rathu Makara	Seeman	
1983	Chuttey	Sediris	
1983	Dadayama	Jakolis Kakunawala	
1984	Podi Ralahami	Ralahami's brother	
1984	Ammai Duwai		
1984	Binari Saha Sudu Banda	Gal Kande Wedikkaraya	
1984	Hitha Honda Kollek		
1984	Rana Derana	Punchirala	
1984	Muthu Menike		
1985	Mihidum Salu	Punchi Mahathaya	
1985	Rajina		
1885	Araliya Mal	Piyadasa	
1985	Raththaran Kanda		
1985	Suddilage Kathawa		
1985	Doo Daruwo		
1985	Puthuni Mata Samawanna		
1985	Kirimaduwal		
1985	Yuganthaya		
1986	Jaya Apatai		
1986	Pooja		
1986	Avurududa		
1986	Prarthana	Douglas	
1986	Asipatha Mamai	Henry Yasaratne	
1986	Athuru Mithuru		
1986	Gimhane Gee Nade	Mudalithuma	
1987	Kiwulegedara Mohottala	Gootavya	
1987	Yugayen Yugayata		
1987	Sathyagrahanaya	Minister	
1987	Podi Vijay		
1987	Kele Kella	Thepanis	
1987	Der Stein des Todes		
1988	The Further Adventures of Tennessee Buck	Witch Doctor	
1988	Gedara Budun Amma	Hamu Mahathaya	
1989	Sinasenna Raththaran		
1989	Waradata Danduwam		
1989	Okkoma Rajawaru		
1989	Obata Rahasak Kiyannam		
1990	Pem Rajadahana	Police officer	
1990	Christhu Charithaya	Snawaka Juwam	
1990	Hitha Honda Puthek	Sinhasena	
1991	Dolosmahe Pahana	Mechanic	
1991	Hitha Dukak Nathi Miniha	Mahathun	
1991	Ali Baba Saha Horu Hathaliha		
1992	Me Mage Waare	Sumedha's father	
1992	Umayangana	Francis	
1992	Rumahthiyay Neethiyaya	Lawyer Ranaraja	
1993	Sargent Nallathambi	George	
1993	Surabi Dena	Simon	
1993	Weli Sulanga	Warnapattibadage Felix Ranasinghe	
1993	Trishule		
1993	Nelum Saha Samanmalee	Doctor	
1995	Ira Handa Illa	Doctor	
1995	Dewiyani Sathya Surakinna	SP Rajapakse	
1995	Demodara Palama	CID Ravi Kanana	
1995	Chitti	Chitti	
1995	Mama Baya Na Shyama		
1995	Edath Chandiya Adath Chandiya	Reggie	
1995	Ayoma		
1996	Sathi		
1997	Age Wairaya 2		
1997	Bawa Duka	Arachchi	
2001	Poronduwa	Opposition politician	
2002	Sathkampa		
2014	Parawarthana	Rathne	
2016	Maya 3D	Principal	
	Dala Rala Pela		
	Haye Pahara		

=== As producer ===
Year	Film	Ref.
1991	Hithata Dukak Nathi Miniha	

=== As Script writer ===
Year	Film	Ref.
1995	Ira Handa Illa	

== See also ==
- Cinema of Sri Lanka
