= Dharmasiri Bandaranayake =

Sri Lankan film director and playwright

Dharmasiri Bandaranayake ධර්මසිරි බණ්ඩාරනායක
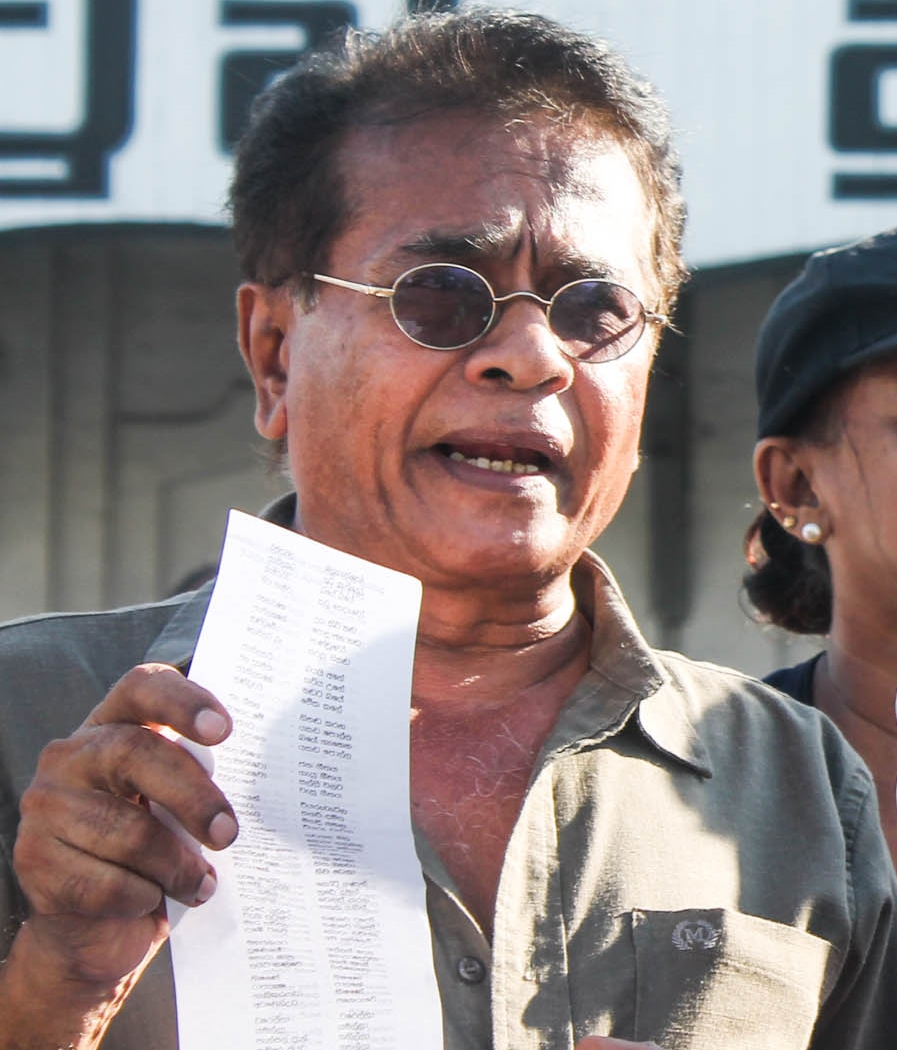
- Born: October 6, 1949 (age 76); Wadduwa, Sri Lanka
- Years active: 1969-present
- Known for: Film directoring and playwright
- Spouse: Swarna Mallawarachchi
- Children: 1

Dharmasiri Bandaranayake (born 6 October 1949) is a Sri Lankan film director and playwright. Particularly working as a playwright, Bandaranayake is an artist who attempts to connect the sociopolitical environment with the civil society through art.

== Career ==
Bandaranyake's debut Hansa Vilak in 1980 dealt with facets of a society at odds with itself. His other films like Thunveni Yamaya (1983), Suddilage Kathaawa (1984), Bawa Duka and Bawa Karma (1997) followed similar themes. Two films Bawa Duka and Bawa Karma challenged the repressive dogma of Buddhism in Sri Lanka. Common arcs in Bandaranayake's films follow the conflicted lives of men and women, transformation of private lives into public affairs, the unpleasant reality of marriage and society and the dark side of human desire.

He produced many stage plays such as Eka Adhipathi, Makarakshaya, Dhawala Bheeshana, Yakshagamanaya and Trojan Kanthavo have all dealt with current issues of national and political importance. In 1999, Bandaranayake first staged the play Trojan Kanthawo which adapted Euripides' Greek drama The Trojan Women for a Sinhala and Tamil audience. It is meant as an anti-war statement and proved to be controversial with the Sri Lankan government despite critical acclaim.

Bandaranayake received several death threats in 2001 after he made plans to stage the play in predominantly Tamil areas. In 2021, his film Hansa Vilak, a new copy has been reprinted with colored format and screened in cinemas from March 10.

== Filmography ==
=== As actor ===
Year	Film	Role	Ref.
1969	Bakmaha Deege	Premadasa	
1978	Veera Puran Appu	Punchi Rala	
1979	Palagetiyo	Sarath Gunewardena	
1980	Sevaneli Aeda Minissu	Victor	
1980	Hansa Vilak	Nissanka Weerasinghe	
1981	Bamba Ketu Hati	Sugath	
1981	Sathara Pera Nimithi	Sudath 'Sadhu'	
1983	Muhudu Lihini		
2015	Bora Diya Pokuna	Desmond	

=== As director ===
Year	Film	Other roles	Ref.
1980	Hansa Vilak	Screenwriter, producer	
1983	Thunveni Yamaya	Screenwriter	
1985	Suddilage Kathaawa	Technical Advisor	
1997	Bawa Duka	Screenwriter	
1997	Bawa Karma	Screenwriter	
