= Udara Palliyaguruge =

Sri Lankan film director (born 1981)

Udara Palliyaguruge (U A Palliyaguru)
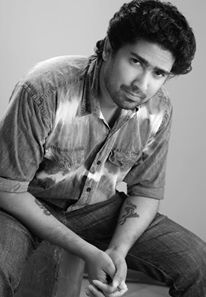
- Udara in 2013
- Born: 7 April 1981 (age 45); Borella, Sri Lanka
- Other names: U A Palliyaguru
- Occupations: Advertising and Marketing Strategist and Creative director /marketing lecturer/ Film director/Film Producer
- Years active: 1996–present
- Spouse: Uththara Palliyaguruge (2008–present)
- Website: www.aristofils.com www.dcinema.lk.comwww.guththila.com

Udara Palliyaguruge (born on 7 April 1981) is a Sri Lankan film director who works in Sinhala cinema. He directed the 2012 film Super Six. A Hindi version of the film was simultaneously released in Mumbai, India.

== Early life and career ==
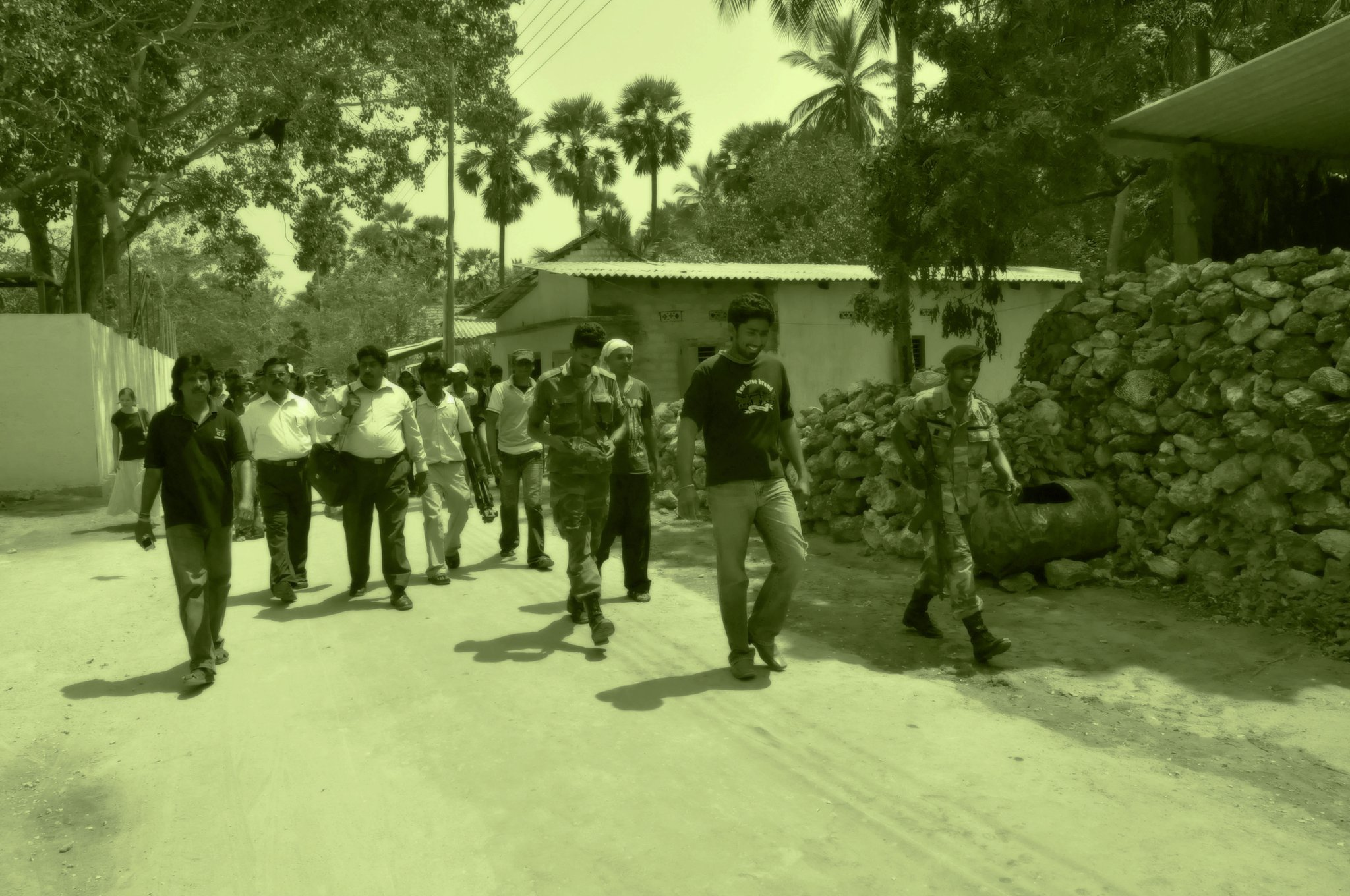
A picture of Udara in his early days.

Udara was involved in stage drama at Gurukula College, Kelaniya, and acted in plays such as Ratnawali, Noh Kabuki Play and Oedipus (the last two being Sinhala translations). Later, he became involved with the National Theatre working as a stage manager, costume designer and actor in productions such as Bansi Marila Nehe, Ape Panthi Kamare, and Queenie. After completing his schooling Udara joined the National Film Institute in Pune, India, where he earned a Bachelor of Arts degree in Filmmaking.

Udara later worked at Sirasa TV and MTV in Sri Lanka, where he produced and directed television programs such as Hindi Top Ten, Lasama, Subasiri, Eye-to-Eye, and Style.

== Career ==
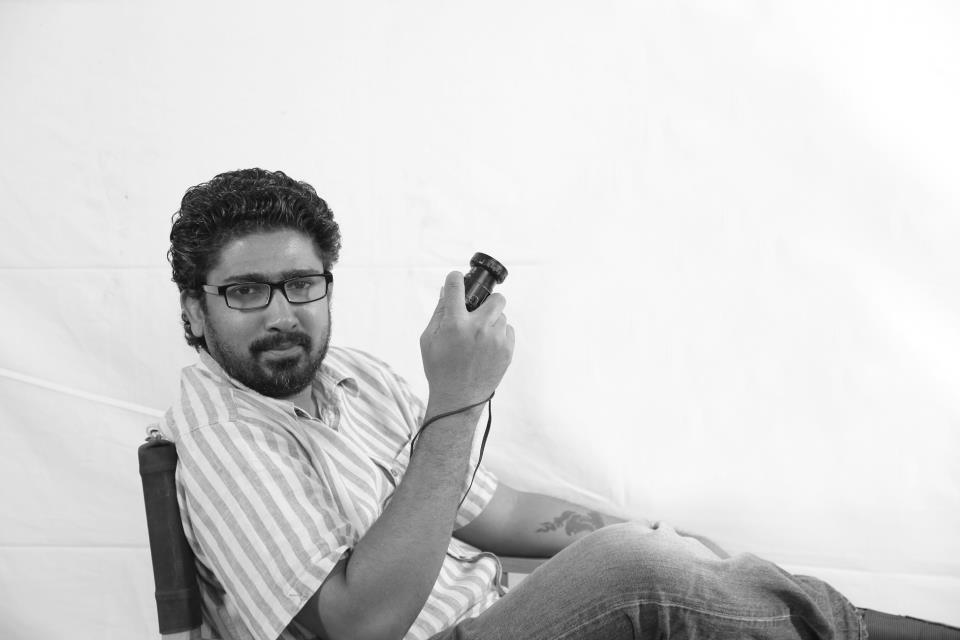
Director's Capture.

Udara has produced multiple full-length films: Super Six (2012), 'Pani Makuluwo' (2017), 'Sama Kumaru Kathawa' (2019), and 'Soosthi' (2020). He has also worked on two Teledramas as the producer: 'Thuththiri' (2018) and 'Crime Scenes' (2018). As managing director of Aristo Films, Udara has produced over 180 TV commercials (brands), 400 TV commercials (non-brands), 40 documentaries, and profiles. He is currently working as CEO of Guththila Strategic Solutions (Pvt) Ltd.

Udara participated in numerous international advertising and communications programmes and awards ceremonies over the years, including:

- AD Asia 2005 to 2008 – Singapore
- Broadcast Asia & CommunicAsia 2005 to 2007 – Singapore
- Team Tech TV and Radio Conference 2004 to 2007 – India

=== Academic career ===
- Visiting Lecturer – University of Kelaniya, Faculty of Marketing Management
- Director – Sri Lanka Television Training Institute
- First to conduct a film workshop in Jaffna in association with Tharunyata Hetak, organized by the Government of Sri Lanka

== Filmography ==
YEAR	MOVIE	ROLE
2012	Super Six	Director
2017	Pani Makuluwo	Producer, Lyricist
2018	Sama Kumaru Kathawa	Producer, Lyricist
2019	Soosthi	Producer, Lyricist
2020	Ale Corona	Producer, Lyricist
2021	Sagawena Kirilliyo	Producer,
2022	Ruhire	Producer, Lyricist
2022	Piyabanna Ayeth	Producer, Lyricist
2025	Sixty Nine	Producer,
2025	Gigalo	Director, Lyricist
2025	Pantram	Producer
2025	Red Easter	Director
2025	Samarisi Pemak	Producer
2025	Aniyam	Producer

YEAR	TELEDRAMA	ROLE
2011	Sagaraya Se Man Adareyi	Producer,
2018	Thuthiri	Producer, writer
2018	Crime Scene	Director/producer, writer

== See also ==
- Super Six
- Pani Makuluwo
- Sama Kumaru Kathawa
- Thuththiri (Teledrama)
