= Pravegaya =

- Teaser Poster
- Directed by: Donald Jayantha
- Written by: Mahesh Rathsara Maddumaarachchi
- Produced by: R. Sadesh Kumar
- Starring: Hemal Ranasinghe; Udari Perera; Jackson Anthony; Gajan Kanesshan
- Cinematography: Vijay Milton
- Edited by: Ajith Ramanayake
- Music by: Bathiya and Santhush
- Release date: 12 June 2015
- Running time: 145 minutes
- Country: Sri Lanka
- Language: Sinhala
- Budget: LKR 48 Million (estimated)

Pravegaya (English: velocity ) is a 2015 Sri Lankan Sinhala action thriller film directed by Donald Jayantha and produced by Sadesh Kumar. It stars Hemal Ranasinghe and Udari Perera with Jayalath Manoratne, Pubudu Chathuranga and Jackson Anthony in supporting roles. Music for the film was written by Bathiya and Santhush. It is the 1,228th Sri Lankan film in the Sinhala cinema. The film is a remake of the 2007 film Polladhavan.

== Plot ==
Hemal is a happy-go-lucky middle-class family guy who spends time playing carrom in the streets with his friends Janith and Kumar. His father and he keep falling into minor misunderstandings, and he indulges in a hopeless romance with a strange girl who he meets at a bus stop. When he is caught in the act of stealing a pittance from his father for booze with his friends, Hemal questions his father’s responsibility towards his upbringing. His angry father gives Hemal some of his savings and tells him to do something with his life. Hemal purchases a TVS Apache bike instead and finds a job. The bike eventually saves his life from a freak incident and he becomes lost, subjecting him to interminable anguish as he searches for his bike. When his family members ask him about his bike, he tells them that he has given it for dealer service.

Hemal comes into conflict with the underworld when he witnesses a brutal murder planned by a gang of Smuggling don, Brando and his accomplices. Hemal finds out that his bike was stolen by a petty bike thief who turns out to be in connection with Brando's younger brother G.J.I. Hemal traces down the culprit as Chamara and hands him over to the local police station. A formal complaint is lodged on Chamara on the same night. Later that night Hemal confesses to his family that his bike was stolen. His Family is very upset with him due to his irresponsible behavior. The next morning G.J.I visits Hemal's residence and threatens him to withdraw the complaint against Chamara. When Hemal refuses, a fight breaks between Hemal and G.J.I, where G.J.I is joined by few of his accomplices, Hemal manages to fight them all and leaves G.J.I beaten and embarrassed among the public. Brando returns home in bail after a murder charge. When he finds out what happened to G.J.I, he gets furious and sends his henchmen to kill Hemal without knowing the reason for his brother's embarrassment. Meanwhile, Hemal, along with his friend and auto driver Kumar, meets Brando at his own residence. G.J.I is not home at that time. Hemal tells the truth to Brando but refuses to believe that his brother G.J.I and his men stole his bike. After hearing from his close ally Wasanth, Brando believes Hemal, apologizing for what happened and promises Hemal that he will do whatever he can to get his bike back. But it was too late for Hemal's father Jayalath Manoratne who receives the attack from G.J.I's men. He was admitted in a hospital and Hemal breaks down after knowing that his father may never walk again after his right leg is paralysed by the attack. Brando, G.J.I and their men visit Hemal to condole and apologize for what happened this time. Hemal turns down the apology and again an immediate fight was about to break between Hemal and G.J.I before Brando separates them both. Although he wants to stay away, Hemal invariably gets dragged into rubbing shoulders with the criminals who now target his family to seek revenge.

Hemal's bike was caught by anti-narcotics wing police and they nab Hemal suspecting him of Drug-smuggling in his bike. They release him after Hemal tells them that his bike was stolen before 10 days and shows them his FIR copy. But he doesn't tell them about G.J.I or Brando. Now Hemal learns that his bike was stolen by Brando's men to escape from a murder scene but it was G.J.I who smuggled drugs in his bike's petrol tank. Hemal loses his job as an employee in his workplace since his bike was a source of transportation, and as he was kept at police custody for one night. Hemal also gets despair from Udari's father for being involved unwillingly with Brando's men. G.J.I makes one more attempt at Hemal's life but he was snubbed again by Hemal. Brando becomes unhappy about this and warns him to quit smuggling if he ever gets in Hemal's business anymore. G.J.I accuses Brando of being a non-caring brother and Wasantha intervenes and warns G.J.I to mind his language. Then surprisingly Brando himself comes in support of his brother to lash out at Wasantha. Wasantha separates briefly from Brando after this conflict. The next day Brando and G.J.I gets attacked by unknown gangsters when they were traveling in their car outside the city. Brando asks his brother to stay inside the car and handles the killers on his own. He gets brutally injured though only to find out that he's been stabbed on back by his own Brother G.J.I. The attack was arranged by G.J.I himself to kill Brando. G.J.I delivers the killer blow before telling that Brando is too complacent of Hemal and he's going to kill him after killing Brando. Brando dies. G.J.I creates a scene among Brando's family, henchmen and Wasantha that he's not aware of who launched the assault on Brando. Wasantha gets furious and vows to kill every enemy of his mentor Brando including Hemal.

Hemal gets his bike back and was relieved for a brief time before coming to know what is going on and G.J.I is after him and his family. He first goes to save Udari. After securing her, he goes to save his family. He thinks the only way to stop this is to confront G.J.I himself. He takes down all the men sent by G.J.I who comes in his way. Meanwhile, Hemal's family were chased down in Mahen's auto-rickshaw by G.J.I's men. Hemal finds G.J.I hiding in an ice factory and engages him in a fight. Hemal gets G.J.I under the knife, threatening him to ask his men to leave Hemal's family. G.J.I does so. When Heaml is about to leave, G.J.I provokes him to continue the fight until death. Hemal manages to dodge G.J.I's swing of his knife and gets a steel rod to fatally knock down G.J.I. Wasantha arrives at the scene. Surprisingly he tells G.J.I that he discovered G.J.I's conspiracy of killing Brando before G.J.I dies. Hemal leaves the scene in his much beloved Apache bike.

== Cast ==
- Hemal Ranasinghe as Hemal Suriyabandara
- Udari Perera as Udari
- Jackson Anthony as Brando
- Pubudu Chathuranga as Maligawatte Wasantha
- Gajan Kanesshan as G.J.I voice over by Jagath Benaragama
- Jayalath Manoratne as Hemal's father, Saranapala
- Maureen Charuni as Hemal's mother, Sheela
- Sanath Gunathilake as CID Officer
- Mahendra Perera as Mahen
- Janith Wickremage as Janiya
- Eranga Jeewantha as Jeewa
- Damitha Abeyratne as Brando's wife
- Kavinga Perera as Hemal's friend
- Nandana Hettiarachchi as Chutte
- Bagya Gurusinghe as Hemal's young sister
- Ranjan Ramanayake as Cameo appearance
- Sriyantha Mendis as Cameo appearance
- Susantha Chandramali as Udari's mother
- D.B. Gangodathenna as Bike shop owner
- Saman Almeida as Herison
- Upeksha Swarnamali - Special appearance in "Mal Sara" (song)
- Yureni Noshika - Special appearance in "Mal Sara" (song)

== Production ==
Pravegeya is an official Sinhala remake of the Indian Tamil film Polladhavan which starred Dhanush and Divya Spandana. It is considered the most expensive and the biggest budgeted film ever made in Sri Lanka. Jacqueline Fernandez was cast into a lead role in September 2011 for Rs.8 million which is considered the highest budget ever paid to an actress in Sri Lanka. The production met initial difficulties when Fernandez failed to appear on her initial shooting date. Filming was done in Sri Lanka at locations including Colombo, Nuwara Eliya and Galle.

== Soundtrack ==
Pravegaya (Movie OST)

Soundtrack album by Bathiya and Santhush
- Released: 2015
- Recorded: 2007
- Genre: Feature film soundtrack
- Language: Sinhalese
- Label: SGM Tunes

Bathiya and Santhush chronology
Hiripoda Wessa (2013)	Pravegaya (Movie OST) (2015)	Maya 3D (2016)

No.	Title	Lyrics	Singer(s)	Length
1.	"Mal Sara"	Shehan Galahetiyawa	Bachi Susan, Mahendra Perera, Hemi Methani
2.	"Mage Adariye"	Dilan Gamage	Sanka Dineth, Umaria Sinhawansa
3.	"Sihlel Wu"	Nilar N Cassim	Bathiya Jayakody, Umaria Sinhawansa
