= Ruhire =

2022 Sinhala horror film

- Sinhala: රුහිරේ
- Directed by: Najini Dikkovita
- Written by: Najini Dikkovita
- Produced by: Guththila Productions
- Starring: Roshan Ranawana; Paboda Sandeepani; Maheshi Madusanka; Vishva Lanka
- Cinematography: Kapila Sugath Wijayaratne
- Edited by: Indika Thushara Suraweera
- Music by: Chamitha Cooray; Bathiya and Santhush
- Distributed by: EAP Films
- Release date: 17 November 2022
- Country: Sri Lanka
- Language: Sinhala

Ruhire (Sinhala: රුහිරේ; lit. 'A Love Written in Blood') is a 2022 Sri Lankan Sinhala horror thriller film directed by Najini Dikkovita in her directorial cinema debut and produced by Udara Palliyaguru for Guththila Productions. The film stars Roshan Ranawana, Paboda Sandeepani, Maheshi Madusanka in lead roles, with Vishva Lanka and Malithi Nanayakkara in supportive roles.

The film was released on 17 November 2022 after the COVID-19 pandemic decreased.

== Cast ==
- Roshan Ranawana as Sampath Nanayakkara
- Paboda Sandeepani as Kamini
- Maheshi Madusanka as Sandya, Sampath's wife
- Vishva Lanka as OIC Viraj
- Malithi Nanayakkara as Priyanthi
- Lalith Jayasinghe as Ranji
- Nilupul Liyanage as Weerasuriya
- John Aravinda
- Dayananda Hewage as
- Abeyrathne Manjula Konara as Liyanage

== Production ==
Ruhire made the directorial debut for young filmmaker Najini Dikkovita, who also penned the screenplay. The film marked the fifth cinema production of Udara Palliyaguru after Sama Kumaru Kathawa, Pani Makuluwo, Soosthi, and Aale Corona.

The film was shot in Colombo, Matale, and Nuwara Eliya areas within 60 days. Music direction was managed by Chamitha Cooray with Bathiya and Santhush, while Ashanthi De Alwis and Santhush provided background vocals. Nilupul Liyanage served as the art director, with editing by Indika Thushara Suraweera and cinematography by Kapila Sugath Vijayaratna. Sound was handled by Nirodha Weranga, Sandamali Ariyarathne and Sanka Ranasinghe are Make-up Artists. Costume were designed by Shalini Silva, and production was managed by Raveen Manjitha. Visual effects were done by Nirodha Weranga.

== Soundtrack ==
No.	Title	Lyrics	Singer(s)	Length
1.	"Mohothin Mohothata"	Udara Palliyaguru	Santhush Weeraman, Ashanthi De Alwis
