= Seetha Kumari =

Sri Lankan actress

Seetha Kumari සීතා කුමාරි
- Born: Seetha Kumari Ahelapola; 9 May 1940; Ehelepola, Matale, Sri Lanka
- Died: 7 August 2013 (aged 73); Kalubowila Hospital, Colombo
- Occupation: Actress
- Years active: 1960–2013
- Children: 1

Seetha Kumari Ehelepola (born 9 May 1940 – died 7 August 2013 as සීතා කුමාරි ඇහැලේපොළ) [Sinhala]), was an actress in Sri Lankan cinema, theater and television. One of the earliest pillars in Sri Lankan film history, Ehelepola had a career that spanned more than four decades. She was notable to act in many motherly roles in television serials as well as films.

== Personal life ==
Kumari was born on 9 May 1940 in Ehelepola village, Matale. She has one son, Pradeep Kumara Abeyratne, who currently lives in Italy.

She died on 7 August 2013 due to a sudden heart attack at the age of 73. After the body being placed in the Colombo Art Gallery on 10 August 2013 from 10 am to 4 pm, funeral took place on the same day at Borella Cemetery.

== Career ==
Her elder sister was married to Matale. After the husband's sudden death, Kumari with her son stayed at elder sister's house. The son was three years old at that time. One day, Ananda Jayaratne came to the house of sister to meet sister's son. When Ananda saw her that day, he asked to act in his film. She entered the cinema industry in 1968 with Ananda Jayaratne's film Adarai Karunavai with the role as a "servant". She was 25 years old at that time. She acted in more than 60 films since 1968 until her last appearance in 2011 film Sinhawalokanaya. Some of her popular films include Desa Nisa, Wathsala Akka, Ran Salu, Akkara Paha and Segawunu Menika.

After the cinema, Kumari started to act in Dhamma Jagoda's stage plays. Some of her popular stage plays are Wes Muhuna, Weniyan Kalu Weniyan and Wessanthara. Kumari learnt dancing from Shesha Palihakkara. After filmmaker A.B. Raj saw her at an exhibition, she offered a role in his film Ramyalatha. Her first lead role in films came through film Sirimalee. Then in 1960, she played the lead role opposite to Gamini Fonseka in the film Pirimiyek Nisa. However, she quit from cinema due to father's death in the following year.

Her maiden television acting came through Dath Kekulu Paala directed by Sriyani Amarasena in 1990. Since then, she acted in many popular serials including, Giju, Saapa Nokarav Daruwane, Girikula, Ramya Suramya, Maya, Dussaranayo and Ulamage Rathriya. She continued to act in single episode poya day television serials Sansare Piya Satahan directed by Ananda Abenayake and Sitha Niwana Katha directed by Dayaratne Ratagedara for many years with the role "Granny".

=== Selected television serials ===
- Dath Kekulu Paala
- Dooli Pinatharu
- Dussaranayo
- Eka Iththaka Mal
- Giju
- Girikula
- Maya
- Meghayen Eha
- Monarathanna
- Nannadunanni
- Ramya Suramya
- Ran Samanalayo
- Saapa Nokarav Daruwane
- Sanda Mudunata
- Sansare Piya Satahan
- Sitha Niwana Katha
- Smarana Samapthi
- Ulamage Rathriya

== Awards ==
Kumari has received many awards at local drama festivals.

- Presidential Award in 1986 for the film Wathsala Akka
- Critics Award for the film Tharanaya in 1998
- Best Supporting Actress at Sumathi Awards in 2000 for the serial Nannadunanni
- Presidential Award in 2005 for the film Pawuru Walalu
- Excellence Awards at Sarasaviya Film Festival in 2008

== Filmography ==
Year	Film	Role	Ref.
1960	Pirimiyek Nisa		
1965	Landaka Mahima		
1966	Layata Laya		
1967	Segawunu Menika		
1968	Ruhunu Kumari		
1968	Adarayay Karunawai		
1969	Mee Masso		
1969	Paara Walalu		
1970	Akkara Paha	Sandha's mother	
1971	Samanala Kumariyo		
1972	Sujeewa		
1972	Singapore Charlie		
1972	Ihatha Athmaya	Nurse	
1974	Lasanda	Plantation worker	
1975	Pem Kurullo		
1975	Tharanga	Mrs. Alpana	
1975	Jeewana Geethaya		
1975	Desa Nisa	Nirukada's aunt	
1976	Nayana		
1976	Wasana	Nurse	
1976	Deviyange Theenduwa	Sophie 'Hami'	
1977	Pembara Madhu		
1977	Niwena Ginna		
1978	Janaka Saha Manju	Orphanage name suggester	
1978	Kumara Kumariyo	Bandara aunty	
1978	Sasara		
1979	Wasanthaye Dawasak	Heen Menike	
1979	Monarathenna		
1980	Parithyagaya	Dhanaprema's mother	
1980	Sabeetha	Mrs. Silva	
1981	Suriyakantha	Mother	
1981	Ridee Thella		
1981	Sathara Diganthaya		
1982	Maha Gedara	Andiris's wife	
1982	Pethi Gomara	Purnika's mother	
1982	Sanasanna Ma		
1982	Wathura Karaththaya		
1982	Malata Noena Bambaru		
1983	Chutte	Celestina	
1983	Athin Athata	Nelum's relative	
1983	Subodha		
1983	Bonikka	Mrs. Serasinghe	
1984	Kiri Kawadi	Basil's mother	
1984	Adara Geethaya		
1984	Deveni Gamana		
1984	Hithawathiya	Maid	
1984	Wadula	Dingirala's mother	
1984	Hadawathaka Wedana		
1984	Arunata Pera	Manike	
1984	Maya	Maggie	
1985	Wathsala Akka		
1986	Mal Warusa	Pillawe Kumarihamy	
1997	Pavuru Valalu	Maggie	
1997	Duwata Mawaka Misa		
1997	Tharanaya		
1997	Punaruthpaththiya		
2000	Sanda Yahanata		
2002	Mage Wam Atha	Wife's mother	
2003	Sulang Kirilli	Wife's mother	
2004	Diya Yata Gindara	Sampath's mother	
2004	Premawanthayo		
2004	Randiya Dahara	Samantha's aunt	
2005	Sulanga		
2006	Hiripoda Wassa	Prema 'Aayamma'	
2006	Samaara		
2006	Kurulu Pihatu	Granny	
2007	Sankranthi		
2008	Machan	Manoj's Grandmother	
2009	Kanyavi	Somawathi	
2011	Sinhawalokanaya	Bindu's granny	
2013	Maw Senehasa		
