= Sirasa Dancing Stars =

- Presented by: Season 1 - Nirosha Perera Suraj Mapa; Season 2 - Nirosha Perera
- Judges: Season 1 - Malini Fonseka Ravindra Randeniya Rosy Senanayake; Season 2 - Sabeetha Perera Ravindra Randeniya Rosy Senanayake; Season 3 - Hirunika Premachandra Dulani Anuradha Nuwan Priyanga
- Country of origin: Sri Lanka
- No. of seasons: 3

Original release
- Network: Sirasa TV
- Release: February 9, 2008 – June 14, 2015

Sirasa Dancing Stars is a Sri Lankan reality dance show broadcast by Sirasa TV. It went on air on February 9, 2008. It won the award for the most popular program in Sri Lanka earlier that year. It's yet another creation of Mr. Susara Dinal, who also created Sirasa Superstar season 1; Season 2; And Sirasa Kumariya which were some of the most popular programs when they were broadcast on Sirasa TV. Many stars have given their utmost support to make this show a success. Three seasons were completed in the show.

== Season 1 ==
Season 1 (2008)
Dushyanth Weeraman & Hashini	Winner
Nilanthi Dias & Nalin	Runner-up
Roshan Ranwana & Sherril	July 13
Saliya Sathyajith & Rohini	July 13
Nilanthi Dias & Nalin	July 6
Nehara Pieris & Asanga De Silva	June 29
Anusha Damayanthi & Rashika	June 22
Upeksha Swarnamali & Sahan	June 8
Yureni Noshika & Chamika	June 1
Ranjan Ramanayake & Shaheema	May 25
Nehara Pieris & Asanga De Silva	May 18
Shiroshi Romeshika & Lucky	May 11
Janith Wickramage & Shanika	May 4
Anton Jude & Kathija	April 27

== Season 2 ==
The season 2 was started just after the first season due to huge publicity. The show was presented by Nirosha Perera again and the judge panel was with two unchanged personnel, where Sabeetha Perera replaced Malini Fonseka. Former One Day International cricketer Akalanka Ganegama with Shaheema won the season 2.

- Winner : Akalanka Ganegama
- Runner-up: Kushani Sandareka
- 3rd place: Chulapadmendra Kumarapathirana

== Season 3 ==
The third season of the show was started six years after the second season. The show also took a new look, where celebrities did not participate in the show. The judges were changed, as was the presenter. Malsha Ravihari won season 3.

== Airing ==
- All three seasons were aired at 9.00pm (SLT) from Sat - Sun on Sirasa TV.

== Grand Finale ==
- Sirasa Dancing Stars - Season 1 July 24, 2008
- Sirasa Dancing Stars - Season 2 January 17, 2009
- Sirasa Dancing Stars - Season 3 June 14, 2015
