= Himali Sayurangi =

Sri Lankan actress

Himali Sayurangi හිමාලි සයුරංගි
- Born: Himali Sayurangi Ranaweera; 18 July 1979 (age 47); Colombo, Sri Lanka
- Education: Anula Vidyalaya
- Occupation: Actress
- Years active: 2003–present
- Height: 5 ft 4 in (163 cm)
- Spouse: Asanga Jayalath (m. 2012)
- Children: 1
- Awards: Best Actress; Best Upcoming Actress

Himali Sayurangi Ranaweera (born 18 July 1979 as හිමාලි සයුරංගි) [Sinhala]), is an actress in Sri Lankan cinema, theater and television. She is best known for the role as Udeni in popular television serial Deveni Inima. She started her artistic career as a presenter and later joined the film industry. She has also excelled in dance, singing and dubbing

== Personal life ==
She was born on 18 July 1979 as the second of the family. She has one elder brother and one younger brother. Younger brother worked in the computer department of a television channel. Her father worked at the Insurance Corporation and mother is a housewife. She completed education from Anula Vidyalaya, Nugegoda.

Sayurangi is married to Asanga Jayalath where the wedding was celebrated on 1 March 2012 at Cinnamon Lakeside hotel in Colombo. The couple has one daughter, Vanuji Senalya who was born in 2013. Asanga is the owner of an advertising agency called Adland Advertising. Sayurangi first met Asanga during a radio play where the bond later become strong during the shooting of Amaa teledrama.

== Career ==
She entered Lama Pitiya in Sri Lanka Broadcasting Corporation at the little age and became a radio presenter. Before entering acting, she worked as a television presenter in Sri Lanka Rupavahini Corporation and hosted the programs Pehebara Ahasa, Nadun Uyana and Nuga Sevana for four years.

Her maiden acting came through the television serial Vaadiya directed by Herbert Ranjith Peiris at the age of 11. She got this opportunity with the help of fellow actress Surangi Ruwanmali.

Her first mega teledrama acting came through Adaraneeya Poornima. In 2016, she joined the mega teledrama Deveni Inima. The serial gained enormous popularity and won several awards at local television festivals. Sayurangi played as the mother "Udeni" of "Anuhas", a courageous woman abandoned by his love "Ravi" during her pregnancy.

Her maiden cinematic experience came through a minor role in 2009 film Ekamath Eka Rateka, directed by Sanath Gunathilake. However, her first screened film is 2007 blockbuster Sikuru Hathe. She won the Sarasaviya award for the best upcoming actress for her role "Samanmali" in the film. Prior to that, she won the Raigam merit award for the television serial Isuru Giri Tharanaya. For about ten years, she played the girlfriend character in many television serials.

Sayurangi is an A-grade artist in Radio, where she rendered her voice for many radio commercials and radio plays. She was first involved in the stage play Mayadevi by K. B. Herath. After that she joined the stage play Daskon which was only shown in Australia. She only acted in these two stage plays. After more than 6 years, Sayurangi made the cinema appearance in the tragic film Tsunami directed by Somaratne Dissanayake. She played the role "Sriyani", a mother who lost the child from 2004 Tsunami. In 2019, she joined the radio play Adara Wedilla produced by Sirasa FM.

She also contested in the reality show Mega Star under the team "Sooryans" led by Yureni Noshika. In 2021, he appeared in the musical megadrama Divi Thura. In the same year, she won the Best Actress award at the Borden International Film Festival in Sweden for the television serial Govi Thaththa directed by Dharshana Ruwan Dissanayake.

=== Selected television serials ===
- Adaraneeya Poornima
- Amaa
- Deveni Inima
- Diriya Doni
- Divithura
- Govi Thaththa
- Isira Bhawana
- Isuru Giri Tharanaya
- Kaviya Numba
- Lokki
- Mama Nemei Mama
- Maya Manthri
- Meedum Amma
- Minigan Dela
- Oba Kawda
- Praana
- Sansara Sakmana
- Sapiriwara
- Sillara Kasi
- Sonduru Sithaththi
- Thaksalawa
- Veeduru Thira
- Aththamai Man Oyata Adarei
- Natath Ayek Sura Mathin
- Kotu

== Filmography ==
| Year | Film | Role | Ref. |
|---|---|---|---|
| 2007 | Sikuru Hathe | Samanmali | |
| 2009 | Ekamath Eka Rateka | Flower girl | |
| 2009 | Kanyavi | Tharushi Nadeesha | |
| 2012 | Prathiroo | Purnima | |
| 2014 | Kalpanthe Sihinayak | Padmi | |
| 2020 | Tsunami | Sriyani | |
| 2025 | Govi Thaththa | | |
| TBD | Uyanata Mal Genna | | |
| TBD | One Blood | | |
| TBD | Mandara | | |

== Awards ==
=== Rupavahini State Drama Festival ===
| Year | Nominee / work | Award | Result |
|---|---|---|---|
| 2008 | Sikuru Hathe | Best Upcoming Actress | Won |

=== Sarasaviya Awards ===
| Year | Nominee / work | Award | Result |
|---|---|---|---|
| 2010 | Sikuru Hathe | Best Upcoming Actress | Won |

=== SIGNIS Awards ===
| Year | Nominee / work | Award | Result |
|---|---|---|---|
| 2011 | Thaksalava | Creative Supporting Actress | Won |

=== Sumathi Awards ===
| Year | Nominee / work | Award | Result |
|---|---|---|---|
| 2016 | Thaksalawa | Best Actress | Won |
| 2016 | Kaviya Numba | Merit Award | Won |

=== Rupavahini State Drama Festival ===
| Year | Nominee / work | Award | Result |
|---|---|---|---|
| 2016 | Kaviya Numba | Best Actress | Won |

=== Raigam Tele'es ===
| Year | Nominee / work | Award | Result |
|---|---|---|---|
| 2020 | Nominating three consecutive times for best actress category | Appreciation award | Won |
