= Super Six (film) =

Super Six සුපර් සික්ස්
- Theatrical release poster
- Directed by: Udara Palliyaguruge
- Story by: Tamil film
- Produced by: Real Image
- Starring: Hemal Ranasinghe; Roshan Ranawana; Aruni Rajapaksha
- Cinematography: Ruwan Costa
- Edited by: A. Ramanayake
- Music by: Mahesh Denipitiya
- Distributed by: EAP Theaters
- Release date: 17 May 2012
- Running time: 120 minutes
- Country: Sri Lanka
- Language: Sinhala
- Budget: LKR 99 Million

Super Six (Sinhala: සුපර් සික්ස්), is a 2012 Sri Lankan coming-of-age sports comedy film directed and produced by Udara Palliyaguruge for Real Image Films. The film stars Saranga Disasekara and Paboda Sandeepani in lead roles along with Hemal Ranasinghe, Aruni Rajapaksha, Roshan Ranawana, Pubudu Chathuranga and in supportive roles. The music was composed by Mahesh Denipitiya. It is the 1174th Sri Lankan film in the Sinhala cinema. It is a remake of the 2007 Tamil film Chennai 600028.

== Plot ==
Super Six is based around a group of friends who live in an enclosed apartment, crazy about nothing but cricket, thinking of playing in a six-a-side tournament. They do many things to keep their team as the best ever six-a-side team, but the mischievous behavior of each and every one causes problems within the team. After the joining of the rival team captain, Jude, the story takes an unexpected twist.

The lives of these mischievous youth with micro-politics and their fantasies are the main theme.

== Cast ==
- Hemal Ranasinghe as Sanath
- Roshan Ranawana as Aravinda
- Aruni Rajapaksha as Sherien
- Saranga Disasekara as Jude
- Paboda Sandeepani as Sulo
- Maleeka Sirisenage as Priya
- Mahendra Perera as Madaya
- Pubudu Chathuranga as Bathiya
- Saman Ekanayake as Raghu
- Eranga Jeewantha as Udaya
- Akalanka Ganegama as Aravinda's friend
- Suneth Chithrananda as Gayya
- Anton Jude as Minister
- Rodney Warnakula Commentator Rodney
- Priyantha Seneviratne Commentator Priyantha
- Sanath Gunathilake as Sanath's brother Preme
- Gamini Hettiarachchi as Jude's father
- Manike Attanayake as Sulo's mother
- Duleeka Marapana as Jude's mother
- Janesh Silva as Constable
- Chathura Perera as Constable
- Mihira Sirithilaka in uncredited role
- Sarath Kulanga as Begger
- Nandana Hettiarachchi as Barber
- Ananda Wickramage as Jayasundara
- D.B. Gangodathenna as Taddy
- Chithra Warakagoda as Jayasundara's wife
- Jeevan Handunnetti as Umpire
- Dasun Nishan in uncredited role
- Ranjan Ramanayake in special appearance for item song
- Anarkali Akarsha in special appearance for item song
- Sanath Jayasuriya in special appearance for item song

== Soundtrack ==
The audio of the film was launched with twelve songs.

No.	Title	Singer(s)	Length
1.	"Raya Pibidee Tharuda Diluni"	Shihan Mihiranga, Devashrie de Silva
2.	"Hangum Danauwwe"	Surendra Perera
3.	"Susumata Susumak"	Sanka Dineth, Uresha Ravihari
4.	"Mada Pinne Supipenne"	Rookantha Gunathilake, Devashrie de Silva
5.	"Sakkara Deyyo Unath"	Rose Alagiyawanna, Shanika Wanigasekara
6.	"Thol Pethi Gawala"	Ajith Kumarasiri
7.	"Six Super Six"	Janaka Vithanage
8.	"Papare Para Para"	Jaya Sri
9.	"Ekamuthu Wemu Api"	Saman Lenin
10.	"Uda Ira Mawwe"	Jaya Sri
11.	"Jayagosha Raw Denne"	Janaka Vithanage
12.	"Lokko Api Lokko"	Himasha Manupriya

== Specialty ==
It was shot in locations such as Sri Lanka, India and Malaysia. The film ranked as the highest budget Sinhala film in the cinema history, where the production cost is more than 990 lakhs of Sri Lankan rupees.
