= Palliyaguruge =

Palliyaguruge is a surname. Notable people with the surname include:

- Ruchira Palliyaguruge (born 1968), Sri Lankan cricketer
- Udara Palliyaguruge, Sri Lankan film director
