= Maanaya =

- Sinhala: මානය
- Directed by: Anju Dhananjaya
- Written by: Anju Dhananjaya
- Produced by: Dian Films
- Starring: Wasantha Kumaravila; Upeksha Swarnamali
- Cinematography: Devinda Guruge
- Edited by: Anura Bandara
- Music by: Nilantha Siri Pathirana
- Distributed by: LFD Circuit
- Release date: 19 July 2019
- Country: Sri Lanka
- Language: Sinhala

Maanaya (Sinhala: මානය) is a 2019 Sri Lankan Sinhala action thriller film directed by Anju Dhananjaya as his debut direction and produced by Roshan Indika Ralapanawa for Dian Films. It stars Wasantha Kumaravila and Upeksha Swarnamali in lead role along with Hemantha Iriyagama and Pavithra Wickramasinghe. Music composed by Nilantha Siri Pathirana.

== Cast ==
- Wasantha Kumaravila as Vikum
- Upeksha Swarnamali
- Hemantha Iriyagama
- Pavithra Wickramasinghe
- Dileep Manohara
- Sumudu Amalka as Angam Gurunnanse
- Prasanna Udagearachchi
- Kasun Dushantha
- Shanaka Dilum Bandara
- Rasika Kumara
- Roshan Aski
- Laksiri Silva
- Nishshanka de Silva
