= Gunasena Galappatty =

Playwright (1927–1984)

- Born: June 7, 1927; Matara, Sri Lanka
- Died: November 27, 1984 (aged 57); Nugegoda
- Education: Dikwella Central College, Rahula College Matara, University of Ceylon, University of Peradeniya, Yale University
- Occupations: Stage director, Teacher, Translator
- Spouse: Sumana Abeysinghe
- Children: Deepthi Sagarika Galappatty, Chanakya TharangaGalappatty, Sampath Galappatty

Gunasena Galappatty (born June 7, 1927, in Dikwella in Matara, Sri Lanka) was a Sri Lankan dramatist, director, producer, and Sinhala radio play writer regarded as the pioneer of suspense drama in Sri Lanka.

== Education ==
Galappatty attended Dikwella Central College and Matara Rahula College. In 1952, he entered University of Ceylon, Peradeniya campus, to study for a bachelor's degree in economics. At Peradeniya, he started associating with Professor Ediriweera Sarachchandra and Charles Silva and was involved in theatre work.

His first production was a folk drama Sandakinduru in 1957 in which he blended folk drama with modern Sinhalese music. This was a success and he was awarded a Fulbright Scholarship to study experimental theatre at Yale University, United States.

He was a teacher at Kotte Ananda Sastralaya in 1955 and next joined for a while the State Language Department as a translator, again continuing as a teacher.

== Career ==
From Yale, he went to Broadway in 1959, the first Sri Lankan to work there as well as in off-Broadway productions. During this time, he came under the influence of the Method school, the American offshoot of Konstantin Stanislavski's approach to acting and stagecraft. He worked under two distinguished teachers, Herbert Berghoff and Uta Hagen. He acted in and co-produced two Broadway dramas, Tea House of the August Moon and The Marriage-Go-Round.

He then traveled to many countries, including Spain, Japan and Russia, to study various drama styles and methods. He admired Spain's Federico García Lorca and spent a few weeks experiencing Lorca productions such as Yerma. In Japan, he studied traditional kabuki drama and was involved in a popular production, The Father.

Returning to Sri Lanka in 1961, Galappatty resumed his theatre work. Abandoning the operatic form modelled on Charles Silva and Sarachhandra crystallization of the Nadagam, he branched out on a new line which tried to fuse the inner-directed acting style that he had imbibed in Broadway with the non-naturalistic native tradition. In 1962, he produced a milestone in Sri Lankan theatre, Muduputtu (Sons of the Seas), showing that the traditional stylistic theatre could be blended very effectively with western realistic technique. Following this, he was at the forefront of Sri Lankan theatre and his productions launched the careers of many talented actors. He was called upon to represent Sri Lanka at United Nations conferences and other international activities.

== Produced plays ==
- 1955 Raththaran (script by Ediriweera Sarachchandra)
- 1956 Sathva Karunava (with students of Kotte Ananda Sastralaya )
- 1957 Sanda kinduru (first production with students of Kotte Ananda Sastralaya )
- 1962 Walahendiya (adaptation of Anton Chekhov's The Bear)
- 1962 Muhudu puththu (adaptation of Federico García Lorca's Yerma )

- 1963 Devatha Eli (adaptation of Bertolt Brecht's The Good Woman of Setzuan)
- 1965 Maha hene Reeriyaka (story by S. W. R. D. Bandaranaike)
- 1966 Liya Thambara
- 1969 Thatha (translated by Ariya Rajakaruna)
- 1976 Desa Nisa

== Screen play ==
- 1972 Desa Nisa

== Radio play ==
- 1963 Kali Yakinna
