= Suseema (film) =

- screen caption
- Sinhala: සුසීමා
- Directed by: Rohan Welivita
- Written by: Rohan Welivita
- Based on: Teledrama and novel by same name
- Produced by: ASP Liyanage Fine Vision Films
- Starring: Suraj Mapa; Paboda Sandeepani; Anarkali Akarsha
- Cinematography: Dinesh Prasanga; Buddhika Mangala
- Edited by: Anusha Jayawardena; Suneth Kelum
- Music by: Nimal Mendis
- Distributed by: MPI Theaters
- Release date: 26 August 2011
- Running time: 90 minutes
- Country: Sri Lanka
- Language: Sinhala

Suseema is a 2011 Sri Lankan Sinhala-language musical romance film directed by Rohan Welivita through his teledrama by the same name and novel by Janaka Ratnayake. The film produced by ASP Liyanage for Fine Vision Films. It stars Suraj Mapa and Paboda Sandeepani in lead roles along with Saranga Disasekara and Robin Fernando. Music composed by Nimal Mendis. The film was filmed by latest B2 HD camera with AVC-Intra recording format, which handled by Sumedha Liyanage, the cinematographer of the project. It is the 1165th Sri Lankan film in the Sinhala cinema.

== Plot ==
Ranga and nàlanka are young musicians.

== Cast ==
- Suraj Mapa as Ranga
- Paboda Sandeepani as Suseema
- Saranga Disasekara as Asela
- Upeksha Swarnamali
- Amila Abeysekara
- Robin Fernando as Suseema's father
- Kapila Sigera
- Nirosha Thalagala

== Soundtrack ==
No.	Title	Singer(s)	Length
1.	"Dasa Piya Gath Senin"	Rajiv Sebastian, Saranga Disasekara
2.	"Mama Kirilliyaka Se"	Mariazelle Gunathilake, Nelu Adhikari
3.	"Nil Pata Rathu Pata"	Saranga Disaseakara, Nelu Adhikari
