= Cindrella (film) =

- Theatrical release poster
- Sinhala: සින්ඩ්‍රෙල්ලා
- Directed by: Inoka Sathyangani
- Written by: Rabin Chandrasiri
- Produced by: Sthree Shakthi Productions
- Starring: Upeksha Swarnamali; Akalanka Ganegama; Jayani Senanayake
- Cinematography: Lalith M. Thomas
- Edited by: M. S. Aliman
- Music by: Navaratne Gamage
- Release date: 5 February 2016
- Country: Sri Lanka
- Language: Sinhala

Cindrella (Sinhala: සින්ඩ්‍රෙල්ලා) is a 2016 Sri Lankan romantic film directed by Inoka Sathyangani and produced by Sthree Shakthi Productions. It stars Upeksha Swarnamali and former Sri Lankan ODI cricketer Akalanka Ganegama in lead roles along with Pubudu Chathuranga and Jayani Senanayake. Music composed by Navaratne Gamage. It is the 1243rd Sri Lankan film in the Sinhala cinema. The film contains 17 songs with the help of 7 music directors.

== Plot ==
Chandula and his two friends have planned a holiday at a luxury hotel. On their day of visit, they see a beautiful girl (Isanka) at the hotel and Chandula starts to catch feelings towards her. Chandula's friends don't accept this, but they let him have her his way and keep enjoying the holiday while he tries and gets to know Isanka. Isanka and Chandula get close to each other and their relationship grows really strong within a week. But, due to some reason Isanka doesn't open up her true self to Chandula and disappears after seven days leaving him nothing but a broken heart.

== Cast ==
- Upeksha Swarnamali as Isanka
- Akalanka Ganegama
- Pubudu Chathuranga
- Jayani Senanayake
- Chandrasoma Binduhewa
- Saman Hemaratne
- Indrachapa Liyanage

== Soundtrack ==
No.	Title	Lyrics	Singer(s)	Length
1.	"Oba Kauda Kaurunda"	Inoka Sathyangani	Athula Adhikari, Samitha Erandathi Mudunkotuwa
2.	"Sithijaya Thama"	Upul Shantha Sannasgala	Kushani Sandareka
3.	"Kurullange Thatu Sindoth"	Inoka Sathyangani	Indrachapa Liyanage, Nadeeka Jayawardena
4.	"Kurullange Thatu"	Inoka Sathyangani	Malith Perera
5.	"Sidu Pathule Sangavi"	Inoka Sathyangani	Nadeeka Guruge
6.	"Nil Ahasin"	Chathra Serasinghe	Upekha Nirmani, Chathra Serasinghe
