= Parawarthana =

2014 film

- Film poster
- Sinhala: පරාවර්තන
- Directed by: Jayanath Gunawardhana
- Written by: Jayanath Gunawardhana
- Produced by: Through the Lens Films
- Starring: Somy Rathnayake; Pubudu Chathuranga; Dulani Anuradha
- Cinematography: Jayanath Gunawardhana
- Edited by: Ruwan Chamara
- Music by: Dinesh Subasinghe
- Distributed by: CEL Theatres
- Release date: 9 January 2014
- Running time: 118 minutes
- Country: Sri Lanka
- Language: Sinhala

Parawarthana (The Reflections) (Sinhala: පරාවර්තන), is a 2014 Sinhala-language Sri Lankan drama thriller film directed by cinematographer Jayanath Gunawardhana. The film co-produced by Mohammad Mujahid, Ranganath Dias with the director himself for Through the Lens Films. It stars Somy Rathnayake, Pubudu Chathuranga and Dulani Anuradha in lead roles along with Geetha Kanthi Jayakody and Bimal Jayakody. The score has been done by Dinesh Subasinghe. It is the 1200th Sri Lankan film in the Sinhala cinema.

== Plot ==
The plot was based on Buddhist teachings of universal justice, retribution.

The story starts calmly with simple things happening in a folk village near Anuradhapura. Rathane Aiya portrays a saintly person who lives in the neighborhood of a mother and two sons Jayasena and Siripala. The day before the poya, Siripala kills his elder brother. Rathne is the crime suspect and arrested. He is sentenced to death on the gallows.

While awaiting death, he confesses his bad behavior during his past. He thrived in terrorising the village with ill-gotten money and power. He came there to evade punishment for a double murder. Since then he has tried to live a good life, putting his past behind him, becoming a 'good samaritan' who is respected by all. Siripala gets shot and confesses that he killed Jayasena.

== Cast ==
- Somy Rathnayake as Rathne
- Pubudu Chathuranga as Siripala
- Dulani Anuradha as Kusum
- Nalin Pradeep Udawela as Jayasena
- Geetha Kanthi Jayakody as Vimalawathi
- Maureen Charuni as Kusum's mother
- Sarath Kothalawala as Kusum's father
- Sithuni Mallawarachchi as Kusum's daughter
- Sanjaya Leelarathna as Prison SP
- Janaka Ranasinghe as Thotiya
- Ariyasiri Gamage as Police Sergent
- Bimal Jayakody as The Police OIC
- Amila Nadeeshani as OIC's wife
- Nilmini Kottege as Chandralatha
- Damitha Saluwadana as Chandare's mother
