= Hathara Varan =

2021 Sri Lankan comedy film

- Sinhala: හතර වරන්
- Directed by: Chathura Perera
- Written by: Suresh Kumarasinghe
- Produced by: Hiru Fashions
- Starring: Chathura Perera; Pubudu Chathuranga; Kumara Thirimadura; Bandula Wijeweera
- Cinematography: Sajitha Veerapperuma
- Edited by: Thanuska Kahandawala
- Music by: George Senanayake
- Distributed by: MPI Theaters
- Release date: 29 January 2021
- Country: Sri Lanka
- Language: Sinhala

Hathara Varan (Sinhala: හතර වරන්) is a 2021 Sri Lankan Sinhala comedy film directed by Chathura Perera in his directorial debut and produced by Sumana Deepthi Gunaratne for Hiru Fashions. It stars director himself in lead role with Pubudu Chathuranga, Kumara Thirimadura and Bandula Wijeweera in supportive roles.

The film has its premiere on 29 January 2021 at the Liberty Cinema in Kollupitiya.

== Cast ==
- Chathura Perera as A.B.C Jinadasa aka Jina
- Pubudu Chathuranga as Police officer
- Kumara Thirimadura as Edward
- Bandula Wijeweera as Hamu mahaththaya
- Teddy Vidyalankara as Edward's henchman
- Thakshila Sewwandi as Sanjana
- Rajitha Hiran as Jine's accomplice
- Nandana Hettiarachchi as Poli Mudalali
- D. B. Gangodathenna as Sanjana's manager
- Samadara Ariyawansa as Piyawathi, Jine's mother
- Dilki Mihiraji as Madhuri, Jine's sister
- Preethi Wijesinghe as Menika, Sanjana's servant
- Anil Jayasinghe as Sootiya
- Ravindra Pradeep
- Asanga Perera as Electric meter reader
- Pawara Hansana as child actor
