= Inoka Sathyangani =

Inoka Sathyangani Keerthinanda
- Born: 1968 (age 57–58); Sri Lanka
- Education: Visakha Vidyalaya
- Occupations: Film director, producer Enokaa Sathyangani at IMDb

Inoka Sathyangani Keerthinanda is an internationally acclaimed Sri Lankan film director, producer and former Chairperson of Sri Lanka Rupavahini Corporation. In 2002 she received critical acclaim for her maiden effort Sulang Kirilli, which deals with the theme of abortion. The film won the highest number of awards won by a single film in the history of Sri Lanka's film industry. She is an active member of "Colombo Independents Cinema Forum" which works towards a "better and wholesome Srilankan cinema". After a highly productive maiden venture, she is regarded as one of the few successful female directors in Sri Lanka.

== Biography ==
=== Early life ===
Keerthinanda had her early education at Sujatha Vidyalaya, before moving on to Visakha Vidyalaya, Colombo for her secondary studies.

== Filmography ==
- Sulang Kirilli (The Wind Bird, 2003)
- Cindrella (film) (2016)

== Awards ==
=== International awards ===
For Sulang Kirilli (The Wind Bird):

- Best Film Award (GRAND PRIX) with the Cash Prize won at the Main Competition given by the International jury of The 8th Dhaka International Film Festival in Bangladesh – 2004 – January.
- The International Critics Award (FIPRESCI AWARD) as the Best film awarded to the Director given by The International Federation of Film Critics at The 8th Dhaka International Film Festival in Bangladesh – 2004 – January.
- Best Actress Award given by the International jury of The 8th Dhaka International Film Festival in Bangladesh – 2004 – January.
- The Award for the Best Film given by the jury of O.C.I.C. (Jury for International Catholic Bureau of Film) at The 21st Cinematica Del Uruguaya in Latin America – 2003.
- The Major Opera Prima Award for the Best New Director given by the International jury of The 21st Cinematica Del Uruguaya in Latin America – 2003.
- Silver Dhow award for the Best Feature Film given by the International jury of the Zanzibar International Film Festival in Tanzania – 2003. Zanzibar International Film Festival is the festival of the Dhow Countries, East Africa's largest cultural event.
- "Certificato Di Merito Silver" given by the International jury of the 12th Prix Leonardo International Film Festival.
- The Award for the Best Director given by the International jury of The 1st Tamil Nadu International Film Festival (Channi International Film Festival) in India – 2004 – December.
- Best Actress Award given by the International jury of The 1st Tamil Nadu International Film Festival in India – 2004 – December.
- Best Cinematography (Feature) award in the International Film category given by the International jury of The New York International Independent Film & Video Festival in USA – 2005 – November. (The largest International Independent Film Festival in the world.)

=== National awards ===
For Sulang Kirilli (The Wind Bird):

- Kala Suri National Award" given for the most promising honourable professionals in the country. This award is given by the President to the most artistic personalities in the nation.
- Vishwa Keerthi" Golden Lion Presidential Award given for the internationally acclaimed Sri Lankan film makers – Presidential awards ceremony 2005.

29th Sarasaviya Film Festival in Sri Lanka – 2004.08.19.

- Best Director Award. / Inoka Sathyangani Keerthinanda
- Best Scriptwriter Award. / Inoka Sathyangani Keerthinanda
- Best Actress Award
- Best Editor Award.
- Best cinematographer Award.
- Best Sound controller Award.
- Best New Actress Award.
- Best Makeup Artist Award.

30th SIGNIS International Salutation (O.C.I.C. Film Awards) Film Festival in Sri Lanka – 2005.01.17.

- Best Director Award. / Inoka Sathyangani Keerthinanda
- Best Scriptwriter Award. / Inoka Sathyangani Keerthinanda
- Best Actress Award
- Best Actor Award.
- Best Editor Award.
- Best cinematographer Award.
- Best Sound controller Award.
- Best New Actress Award.
- Best Makeup Artist Award.
- Best Art Direction Award.

Presidential Awards – 2005.09.09.

- Best lyrics Award. / Inoka Sathyangani Keerthinanda
- Best Singer Award
- Best Sound controller Award.
- Best Supporting Actress Award.
- Best Music Award.
- Nominated for all the other main categories including Best Screen play, Best Director & Best Film.
