= Sulang Kirilli =

Sulang Kirilli සුලං කිරිල්ලී
- Damitha and Linton
- Directed by: Inoka Sathyangani
- Written by: Inoka Sathyangani
- Produced by: Inoka Sathyangani
- Starring: Damitha Abeyratne; Linton Semage; Jayani Senanayake
- Cinematography: Channa Deshappriya
- Edited by: Ravindra Guruge
- Music by: Nawarathna Gamage
- Release date: 11 September 2003
- Running time: 125 minutes
- Country: Sri Lanka
- Language: Sinhala

Sulang Kirilli (The Wind Bird), (Sinhala: සුලං කිරිල්ලී) is a 2002 Sinhalese language feature film directed and produced by Inoka Sathyangani. It stars Linton Semage and Damitha Abeyratne in lead roles along with Jayani Senanayake and Leonie Kotalawela. Music composed by Navaratne Gamage. It is the 1018th Sri Lankan film in the Sinhala cinema.

== Plot ==
Rathi (Damitha) is a young girl from a remote village, working in a suburban garment factory. She befriends a young soldier Shantha (Linton) and falls in love. They start enjoying each other’s youthful warmth quite freely.

But one fine day Rathie realizes she has conceived with a child (Pramudi). Grappling with this unexpected new realization, she gets carried away in to a world of her own. A Simple and beautiful dream that any young woman would want to build for her with a marriage and a family life. Thus an unspoiled girl from a rural village, she is very stiff and independent to live alone in her own way in a small room in the city.

While she immerses herself quite happily in this elusive world, she jerks herself out of dreams when she gets to know he is a married man. Her world then starts drifting between the two extremes of her dreams and reality. She finds herself enjoying life in the dream world but reality drags her out of it. In the real world she is debarred from bringing up an illegal child without a father by the civil law of the country while depriving her of aborting the pregnancy by the penal code, which considers abortions as a severe criminal offence. A young girl caught in this dilemma condemned by society, is the dream world her only retreat?

A cinematic voyage of two hours between dreams and reality, permit the audience to realize the difference between awakening life through dreams and pushing life to sleep within reality. This provokes a discussion on social realities that one does not encounter openly in society.

== Cast ==
- Damitha Abeyratne as Rathi
- Linton Semage as Shanta
- Jayani Senanayake as Violet
- Leonie Kotalawela
- Buddhadasa Vithanarachchi
- Rada De Silva as Consultant
- Grace Ariyavimal as Mother
- Bandula Vithanage as Doctor
- Senaka Wijesinghe as Shantha's friend
- Pramudi Karunaratne as Rathi's daughter
- Seetha Kumari as Wife's mother
- D.B. Gangodathenna as Rathi's father
- Sanet Dikkumbura as Beggar

== Awards ==
=== International awards ===
- Best Film Award (GRAND PRIX) with the Cash Prize won at the Main Competition given by the International jury of The 8th Dhaka International Film Festival in Bangladesh – 2004 – January.
- The International Critics Award (FIPRESCI AWARD) as the Best film awarded to the Director given by The International Federation of Film Critics at The 8th Dhaka International Film Festival in Bangladesh – 2004 – January.
- Best Actress Award given by the International jury of The 8th Dhaka International Film Festival in Bangladesh – 2004 – January.
- The Award for the Best Film given by the jury of O.C.I.C. (Jury for International Catholic Bureau of Film) at The 21st Cinematica Del Uruguaya in Latin America – 2003.
- The Major Opera Prima Award for the Best New Director given by the International jury of The 21st Cinematica Del Uruguaya in Latin America – 2003.
- Silver Dhow award for the Best Feature Film given by the International jury of the Zanzibar International Film Festival in Tanzania – 2003. Zanzibar International Film Festival is the festival of the Dhow Countries, East Africa's largest cultural event.
- "Certificato Di Merito Silver" given by the International jury of the 12th Prix Leonardo International Film Festival.
- The Award for the Best Director given by the International jury of The 1st Tamil Nadu International Film Festival (Channi International Film Festival) in India – 2004 – December.
- Best Actress Award given by the International jury of The 1st Tamil Nadu International Film Festival in India – 2004 – December.
- Best Cinematography (Feature) award in the International Film category given by the International jury of The New York International Independent Film & Video Festival in USA – 2005 – November. (The largest International Independent Film Festival in the world.)

=== National awards ===
- Kala Suri National Award" given for the most promising honourable professionals in the country. This award is given by the President to the most artistic personalities in the nation.
- Vishwa Keerthi" Golden Lion Presidential Award given for the internationally acclaimed Sri Lankan film makers – Presidential awards ceremony 2005.
- 29th Sarasaviya Film Festival in Sri Lanka – 2004.08.19.
  - Best Director Award. / Inoka Sathyangani Keerthinanda
  - Best Scriptwriter Award. / Inoka Sathyangani Keerthinanda
  - Best Actress Award
  - Best Editor Award.
  - Best cinematographer Award.
  - Best Sound controller Award.
  - Best New Actress Award.
  - Best Makeup Artist Award.
- 30th SIGNIS International Salutation (O.C.I.C. Film Awards) Film Festival in Sri Lanka – 2005.01.17.
  - Best Director Award. / Inoka Sathyangani Keerthinanda
  - Best Scriptwriter Award. / Inoka Sathyangani Keerthinanda
  - Best Actress Award
  - Best Actor Award.
  - Best Editor Award.
  - Best cinematographer Award.
  - Best Sound controller Award.
  - Best New Actress Award.
  - Best Makeup Artist Award.
  - Best Art Direction Award.
- Presidential Awards – 2005.09.09.
  - Best lyrics Award. / Inoka Sathyangani Keerthinanda
  - Best Singer Award
  - Best Sound controller Award.
  - Best Supporting Actress Award.
  - Best Music Award.
  - Nominated for all the other main categories including Best Screen play, Best Director & Best Film.
