= Sara (2010 film) =

- Sinhala: සරා
- Directed by: Nishantha Pradeep
- Written by: Rabin Chandrasiri
- Based on: Mega Teledrama
- Produced by: G. Nandasena; Janaka Siriwardena; Rohan Wanaguru
- Starring: Sujani Menaka; Pubudu Chathuranga; Asanka Perera
- Cinematography: G. Nandasena
- Edited by: M. S. Aliman
- Music by: Shameel J
- Distributed by: CEL Theatres
- Release date: 23 October 2010
- Running time: 105 minutes
- Country: Sri Lanka
- Language: Sinhala

Sara (Sinhala: සරා) is a 2010 Sri Lankan Sinhala thriller film directed by Nishantha Pradeep and co-produced by G. Nandasena, Janaka Siriwardena and Rohan Wanaguru. The film was inspired by the soap opera of the same name, which was telecasted by TV Derana. It stars characters from the miniplay where Sujani Menaka and Pubudu Chathuranga in lead roles along with Maureen Charuni and Asela Jayakody. Music Composed By Shameel J. It is the 1145th Sri Lankan film in the Sinhala cinema.

== Cast ==
- Sujani Menaka as Sara
- Pubudu Chathuranga as Denuka
- Maureen Charuni as Sara's mother
- Chandika Nanayakkara as Police Inspector
- Asanka Perera
- Asela Jayakody
- Srimal Wedisinghe
- Ananda Wickramage
- Tyrone Michael
- Damitha Saluwadana
- Premadasa Vithanage
