= Father, The Farmer =

2025 Sri Lankan musical drama film directed by Darshana Ruwan Dissanayake

Govi Thaththa
- Sinhala: ගොවි තාත්තා
- Directed by: Darshana Ruwan Dissanayake
- Written by: Darshana Ruwan Dissanayake
- Produced by: Sarath Bandara Kokwewa
- Starring: Jagath Chamila; Himali Sayurangi; Dharmapriya Dias
- Music by: Darshana Ruwan Dissanayake
- Production company: Kokwewa Creations
- Release date: 14 February 2025; (Sri Lanka)
- Country: Sri Lanka
- Language: Sinhala

Govi Thaththa also more commonly known by its international premiere release title Father, The Farmer is a 2025 Sri Lankan Sinhala-language musical drama film written and directed by Darshana Ruwan Dissanayake on his directorial debut. The film stars Jagath Chamila, Himali Sayurangi and Dharmapriya Dias in the pivotal roles.

The film is based on real life incidents which unfolded in the backdrop of farming and delves into the topic based on the real life situations faced by a typical farming community which hails from a prominent hamlet called Unagalawehera. The film had its international premiere at the Boden International Film Festival in 2021. The film had its theatrical release in Sri Lanka on 14 February 2025 coinciding with the Valentines Day. The film received mixed reviews from critics.

== Cast ==
- Jagath Chamila as Ukkun mahaththaya
- Himali Sayurangi as Biso menike
- Dharmapriya Dias as Somapala
- Sanath Wimalasiri as Kudaa Banda
- Dimuthu Chinthaka as Councillor Esala Preme
- Gamini Jayalath
- Sanath Chandasekara
- Eric Madanayake
- Nirosha Virajini as Priyadashani teacher
- Nadeesha Rangani as Anula
- Sooriya Dayaruwan as Ukkun's elder son Vimale
- Daya Wayaman
- Sachini Ranawaka as Malee
- Sachini Nisansala Sandamali as Sandamali teacher
- Prasadi Nimanthika Wijerathna
- Sarath Bandara Kokwewa
- Attanayake Bandara
- Dilip Maduranga
- Senaka Edirisinghe

== Synopsis ==
The film starts off with an interesting premise that comes with the implementation of paradigm shift mindset in describing the side effects, ripple effects and consequences of moving beyond nature-friendly agro practices with the advent of chemical-based agriculture methodology. The film storyline carries the raw emotions often with the tone of sadness in the point of view of director's narration in an aesthetic art form.

== Production ==
The film was announced as a maiden directorial venture by renowned music composer Darshana Ruwan Dissanayake. The film was reportedly producer by a farmer who goes by the name Sarath Bandara Kokwewa and produced the film under his own banner Kokwewa Creations. Sarath Bandara Kokwewa hailed from a traditional agricultural family and he made an ambitious effort in collaborating with Darshana Ruwan Dissanayake to come up with a film project to spread an awareness about how the modern advanced technological methods used in agriculture have caused a massive downfall in the agriculture crop yields and how the situation is further aggravated with the climate change.

== Accolades ==
The film was recognised at the Boden International Film Festival and it received several awards upon its international premiere at the Boden International Film Festival. Darshana Ruwan Dissanayake achieved a top notch performance by hitting the jackpot right on the money especially on his directorial debut as he was adjudged as the Best Director along with an honourable Mention for Best Music Composer award. Jagath Chamila who was the main male lead actor received the Best Actor award while Himali Saurangi collected the Best Actress Award. The producer of the film Sarath Bandara Kokwewa was conferred with the First Time Feature Film Award.

== See also ==
- List of Sri Lankan films of the 2020s
