= Maureen Charuni =

Sri Lankan actress (born 1963)

- මොරින් චාරුනී
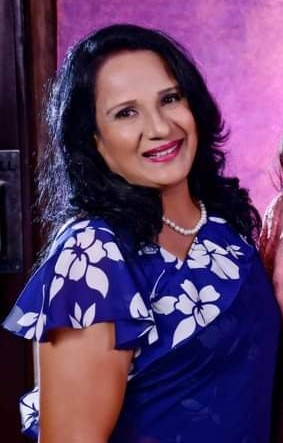
- Born: Kurukulasuriya Maureen O'Hara Perera; September 19, 1963 (age 62); Kurunegala, Sri Lanka
- Occupation: Actress
- Years active: 1984–present
- Spouse: Gihan Ranjith Imbulana
- Children: Janani Chathurika

Kurukulasuriya Maureen O'Hara Perera (born 19 September, 1963 as මොරින් චාරුනී) [Sinhala]), popularly known as Maureen Charuni, is an actress in Sri Lankan cinema theater and television. Highly versatile actress who dominated television drama, Charuni usually acts in young motherly roles in many dramas and films.

== Personal life ==
She was born on 19 September 1963 in the village Emibillawatta, in Wadakada, Kurunegala as the eldest of the family. Her father, who was very fond of western cinema, named the first child by the name of American actress Maureen O'Hara. She has one younger brother, Janaka and two younger sisters: Mala and Meena. The family moved to Wennappuwa because her father wanted to send the three girls to a girls' school. Then she studied in Holy Family Girls School, Wennappuwa.

She passed Advanced level with honors in Commerce stream. Meanwhile, she studied sitar under teacher Tharsi Warnakulasuriya and assistant teacher Ansus. Then she completed the exams in Sri Lanka and Visharad part one in India. After obtaining the degree, she worked as a teacher for few years and taught English language, English literature and sitar playing.

She is married to Gihan Ranjith Imbulana, who is involved in the tourism industry. The couple has one daughter.

== Acting career ==
Initially her father strongly opposed her decision to become an actress. She unexpectedly went Colombo with her friend Deepthi and her uncle Piyal Kumaratunga to get an opportunity to be involved in the film Karadiya Kuralla. However, she was finally selected for the film and made her maiden cinematic experience came through film Karadiya Walalla, directed by Cyril Wickramage. But the film Ranmalige Wasanawa screened before the Karadiya Walalla.

Since then, her notable acting came through the role of "Nanda" in Bertram Nihal's blockbuster Gamperaliya teledrama, Tissa Abeysekera's Thunkal Sihinaya and Maya. Later she made motherly roles in many popular tele serials and films such as: Sara, Paba, Sandagalathenna, Chandingeth Chandiya, Golu Muhude Kunatuwak, Trishulaya, Anjalika, Panamankkada, Teacher Amma and Aliya.

She directed the film Hansa Vilapaya in 2000.

=== Selected television serials ===
- Aaliya
- Aalawanthi
- Abarthu Atha
- Akshi
- Amaa
- Anagana
- Ananthaya
- Ann
- Anuhas Vijithaya
- Anuththara
- Aravinda saha Indu as Indu
- Ayomi as Mangalika
- Batahira Ahasa
- Bodhi
- Dangakara Tharu
- Daruwange Ammala
- Dedunnai Adare
- Dedunu Sihina
- Dedunu Yanaya
- Depath Nai
- Deveni Amma
- Divyadari
- Gamperaliya as Nanda
- Gimhana Tharanaya
- Guwan Palama
- Haara Kotiya
- Heeye Manaya
- Himi Nethi Hadakata
- Hirusanda Maima
- Irudeniyaya
- Isuru Sangramaya
- Jayathuru Sankaya
- Kalu Sewanella
- Koombiyo
- Kulawanthayo
- Lasa Rala
- Mandaram Kathawa
- Mila
- Millewa Walawwa
- Minigandela
- Nandunana Neyo
- Nethu Addara
- Oba Mageya
- Paara
- Paata Kurullo
- Panamankada
- Poddi
- Pembara Maw Sanda
- Ran Bedi Minissu
- Ran Kira Soya
- Ran Samanalayo
- Ran Sevanali
- Salmal Landa
- Samanalayano
- Samanala Sihinaya
- Samanala Yaya
- Sanda Diya Mankada
- Sandagalathenna as Dingiri Menika
- Sandagiri Pawwa
- Sanda Hiru Tharu
- Sapirivara
- Sara
- Saranganaa
- Saveena
- Senehase Nimnaya
- Sihina Samagama
- Sihina Siththaravi
- Sihina Sithuvam
- Sil
- Siri Sirimal
- Siyapayth Arama
- Snehaye Daasi
- Sudu Paraviyo as Iresha
- Sulanga
- Suwanda Obai Amme
- Teacher Amma
- Thuththiri
- Vihanga Geethaya
- Wasantha Kusalana
- Yugandaraya

=== Selected stage dramas ===
- Dangamalla

== Filmography ==
Key
†	Denotes films that have not yet been released

Year	Film	Role	Ref.
1984	Ranmalige Wasanawa		
1985	Du Daruwo		
1985	Karadiya Walalla		
1986	Sinha Pataw		
1986	Asipatha Mamai	Gamanayake's wife	
1986	Peralikarayo	Maureen	
1987	Sathyagrahanaya	Office 'truth' secretary	
1988	Chandingeth Chandiya		
1989	Randenigala Sinhaya	Rekha	
1990	Veera Udara		
1990	Sambudu Mahima		
1990	Jaya Kothanada		
1991	Asai Bayai		
1991	Golu Muhude Kunatuwa		
1992	Sakkara Suththara		
1992	Sinha Raja		
1992	Salli Thibunata Madi		
1992	Rumathiyay Nithiyay	Neeta	
1992	Sayanaye Sihinaya		
1993	Sagara Thilina		
1993	Trishule		
1993	Juriya Mamai	Mary	
1994	Mawubime Weerayo		
1994	Shakthi		
1997	Goodbye Tokyo		
2000	Hansa Vilapaya		
2003	Irasma	Sonali	
2004	Gini Kirilli		
2006	Eka Malaka Pethi	Mahela's mother	
2006	Anjalika	Anjalika's mother	
2010	Uththara	Shanilka's mother	
2010	Suwanda Denuna Jeewithe	Rashmi's mother	
2010	Sara	Sara's mother	
2011	Sinhawalokanaya	Magilin, Jangu's mother	
2012	Sakvithi Dadayama		
2014	Parawarthana	Kusum's mother	
2014	Parapura	Chethana's mother	
2014	Duwana Muwan		
2015	Ira Sewaya	Yvonne	
2015	Pravegaya	Hemal's mother	
2016	Maya 3D	Rekha's mother	
2016	Adaraneeya Kathawak	Piyavi's mother	
2017	Hima Tharaka		
2018	Punchi Andare	Andare's mother	
2020	Soosthi	Soosa's mother	
2023	Uthuru Sulanga		
2023	Kathuru Mithuru	Samson's wife	
2024	Sihina Sameekarana	Ridmi's mother	
TBA	Sparsha †		
TBA	Akarsha †		
TBA	Deva Matha †		
TBA	Sōṇā †		
TBA	Kalpana †		
TBA	Hello From The Other Side †	Awantha's mother	
TBA	Abheetha †		
TBA	Dharmayuddhaya 3 †		
