= Desa Nisa =

- DVD Cover
- Directed by: Lester James Peries
- Written by: Gunasena Galappatty
- Produced by: Lester James Productions; Northwestern Enterprises
- Starring: Joe Abeywickrema; Sriyani Amarasena; Ravindra Randeniya
- Cinematography: Sumitta Amerasinghe
- Edited by: Gladwin Fernando
- Music by: Premasiri Khemadasa
- Release date: 1975
- Running time: 97 minutes
- Country: Sri Lanka
- Language: Sinhala
- Budget: 200,000 rupees

Desa Nisa (English: A Certain Look) is a 1975 Sri Lankan drama film directed by Lester James Peries. The film stars Joe Abeywickrema as Nirudaka, an ugly man who worries that his blind wife will leave him if she regains her sight.

Peries made the film as a vehicle for Joe Abeywickrema. The source material was a Gunasena Galappatti play which was made more accessible to a lay audience by Galappatti on Peries' urging. Critics were puzzled by the film and wrote that it was Peries' most mysterious.

== Plot ==
Nirudaka (Joe Abeywickrema) is an ugly man who is only loved by his mother (Denawaka Hamine) and taunted by others. He falls in love with blind Sundari (Sriyani Amarasena) and they get married.

The mother then feels obliged to cure Sundari's blindness much to Nirudaka's chagrin and takes her to a hermit (Ravindra Randeniya) with healing powers. Nirudaka does not wish her to regain her sight, but against his underlying wish he and his mother accompany Sundari to get her healed with the aid of the hermit, who resides atop a mountain.

== Cast ==
- Joe Abeywickrama as Nirukada
- Sriyani Amarasena as Sundari
- Denawaka Hamine as Nirukada's mother
- Ravindra Randeniya as Hermit
- Seetha Kumari as Nirukada's aunt
- Preethi Randeniya as Younger village girl
- Agra Sajivani as Older village girl
- Sriyani Perera as Hermit's former patient
- Somapala Dharmapriya as Shirtless villager
- Victor Wickremage as Villager with mustache
