= Uththara =

- Sinhala: උත්තරා
- Directed by: Sandun Rajakaruna
- Written by: Mahesh Rathsara Maddumaarachchi
- Produced by: Cinelka Films
- Starring: Suraj Mapa; Hashini Gonagala; Sanath Gunathilake
- Cinematography: Chandana Dharmapriya
- Edited by: Stanley de Alwis
- Music by: Rohana Weerasinghe
- Distributed by: EAP Theaters
- Release date: 4 February 2010
- Country: Sri Lanka
- Language: Sinhala

Uththara (Sinhala: උත්තරා) is a 2010 Sri Lankan Sinhala family drama film directed by Sandun Rajakaruna and produced by Vaijira Rajapakse for Cinelka Films. It stars Suraj Mapa, debut actress Hashini Gonagala and Sanath Gunathilake in lead roles along with Anton Jude and Upeksha Swarnamali. Music composed by Rohana Weerasinghe. It is the 1134th Sri Lankan film in the Sinhala cinema.

The film has been shot in and around many locations in Colombo, Matale and Nuwara Eliya. A felicitation ceremony was held in Matale on February 22 at 9 am organized by Dr. Jayasena Beligala and Panhinda Education Institute.

== Cast ==
- Suraj Mapa as Shanilka
- Hashini Gonagala as Uththara
- Sanath Gunathilake as Minister Niwanthudawa
- Rebeka Nirmali as Rupa
- Lal Kularatne
- Anton Jude as Victor
- Daya Alwis as Emmanuel
- Sahan Ranwala as Praveen Pathiratne
- Sarath Chandrasiri as Jananatha
- Vishaka Siriwardana
- Maureen Charuni as Shanilka's mother
- Janith Wickramage as Shanilka's friend
- Upeksha Swarnamali
- Tyrone Michael
- Kumara Thirimadura as Security officer

== Soundtrack ==
No.	Title	Lyrics	Singer(s)	Length
1.	"Mal Mitak Thiyanna"	Kelum Srimal	Kasun Kalhara
2.	"Ahasa Haduwa Ira Handa"	Bandula Nanayakkarawasam	Uresha Ravihari, Pradeep Rangana
3.	"Keewa Sulanga Mata Keewa"	Kelum Srimal	Uresha Ravihari, Bathiya and Santhush, Umara Sinhawansa
4.	"Pini Pokuruth Walapena Yame"	Mahesh Rathsara Maddumaarachchi	Pradeep Rangana
