= Seema Na Akase =

- Sinhala: සීමා නෑ ආකාසේ
- Directed by: Nihal Bandara
- Written by: Nihal Bandara
- Produced by: Active Motion Pictures
- Starring: Pubudu Chathuranga; Aruni Mallawarachchi; Dhananji Tharuka
- Cinematography: Ayeshmantha Hettiarachchi
- Edited by: Pravin Jayaratne
- Music by: Sanka Ruwandika
- Distributed by: LFD Theatres
- Release date: 10 November 2017
- Country: Sri Lanka
- Language: Sinhala

Seema Na Akase (Boundless Sky) (Sinhala: සීමා නෑ ආකාසේ) is a 2017 Sri Lankan Sinhala romantic film directed by Nihal Bandara and produced by Tissa Balasuriya Arachchi for Active Motion Pictures. It stars Pubudu Chathuranga and newcomer Aruni Mallawarachchi in lead roles along with Dhananji Tharuka and Keshan Shashindra. Music co-composed by Sanka Ruwandika.

The first screening was held on 10 November 2017 at Tharangani Hall of National Film Council on 6.15pm. The film has received positive reviews from critics. It is the 1290th Sri Lankan film in the Sinhala cinema.

== Cast ==
- Pubudu Chathuranga as Isuru
- Aruni Mallawarachchi as Apeksha
- Dhananji Tharuka as Shavindri
- Keshan Shashindra as Charaka
- Sriyani Amarasena as Isuru's mother
- Buddhadasa Vithanarachchi as Apeksha's father
- Sangeetha Basnayake as Apeksha's mother
- Sanjula Diwaratne as Pasan
- Gayan Hettiarachchi as Sonal
- Nalaka Daluwatte as Dream boy
- Kalpa Kelum as Varuna
- Naleen Kumara as Chirash

== Songs ==
The film included five songs.

No.	Title	Lyrics	Singer(s)	Length
1.	"Lunui Bathui"	Dilshan Samarasinghe	Dilshan Samarasinghe
2.	"Wayasa Hari Nam"	Kaushik Milinda	Kaushik Milinda, Chamari Perera
3.	"Seema Na Akase (female version)"	Nihal Bandara	Imasha Muthukumari
4.	"Bhawen Bhawe"	Nihal Bandara	Kaushik Milinda, Chamari Perera
5.	"Seema Na Akase (original version)"	Nihal Bandara	Jagath Jayawardena, Dilshan Samarasinghe, Dhananji Tharuka
