= Sikuru Hathe =

2009 Sri Lankan comedy film

Sikuru Hathe සිකුරු හතේ
- DVD poster
- Directed by: Giriraj Kaushalya
- Written by: Giriraj Kaushalya
- Based on: Giriraj Kaushalya
- Produced by: New Imperial Talkies
- Starring: Vijaya Nandasiri; Anarkali Akarsha; Suraj Mapa
- Cinematography: Ruwan Costa
- Edited by: Ravindra Guruge
- Music by: Tharupathi Munasinghe; Rohana Weerasinghe; Navaratne Gamage
- Production company: The Video Team (TVT)
- Distributed by: EAP (original release)
- Release date: 16 August 2007
- Country: Sri Lanka
- Language: Sinhala

Sikuru Hathe (Sinhala: සිකුරු හතේ Translation: Venus at 7th place of the horoscope) is a 2007 Sri Lankan Sinhala comedy film directed by Giriraj Kaushalya and produced by Hans Anton Vanstarex for New Imperial Talkies. The music was composed by the musician Tharpuathi Munasinghe. It stars Vijaya Nandasiri, Anarkali Akarsha and Suraj Mapa in lead roles along with Rodney Warnakula and Susila Kottage. Music composed by Tharupathi Munasinghe, and songs composed by Rohana Weerasinghe and Navaratne Gamage. It is the 1092nd Sri Lankan film in the Sinhala cinema. One of best comedy films ever produced in the country, Sikuru Hathe became the highest-grossing film in 2007 and won many awards at several local film award ceremonies.

The film earned a record collection of Rs. 26 million for 31 days with nearly 300,000 patrons in 25 cinema theaters across the country. It collected Rs. 50 million with 500,000 patrons on October 30 completes 75th day.

== Plot ==
The story revolves around the match-maker Mangala Jaya (Vijaya), who is a poor, but kind hearted person with a single daughter. A series of hilarious incidents went through the plot, and though he is a match-maker, he fails to find a good boy to his young daughter. At last, his daughter was able to find the soul mate.

== Cast ==
- Vijaya Nandasiri as Mangala Jaya - the match-maker
- Anarkali Akarsha as OIC's daughter
- Suraj Mapa as Vidyartha
- Himali Sayurangi as Samanmali
- Rodney Warnakula as Sirimal
- Priyantha Seneviratne as Transgender 1
- Anton Jude as Transgender 2
- Susila Kottage as Mangala Jaya's wife
- Hemantha Iriyagama as Police Sergeant Ariyapala
- Tony Ranasinghe as OIC
- Iranganie Serasinghe as Vidyartha's granny
- Kumara Thirimadura as Carpenter
- Mihira Sirithilaka as Necklace thief
- Sarath Kothalawala as Tortured husband
- Veena Jayakody as OIC's wife
- Wasantha Wittachchi as Police constable
- Lalith Janakantha as Three-wheel driver
- Jeevan Handunetti as Wedding photographer
- Bandula Wijeweera as Harmonium player
- Lal Kularatne as Veteran bachelor
- Sarath Chandrasiri as Police constable
- Ananda Atukorale as Police constable
- Somasiri Alakolange as Vidyartha's grandfather
- Nilmini Kottegoda in uncredited role

== Soundtrack ==
No.	Title	Singer(s)	Length
1.	"Nilata Nile Nil Kateta"	Kasun Kalhara, Uresha Ravihari
2.	"Samanmali Mage Mali"	Rodney Warnakula
3.	"Ira Handa Depase Nam"	Sunil Perera, Bandula Wijeweera

== Awards ==
- 2007 SIGNIS Award for Best Actor - Vijaya Nandasiri
- Most Popular Actor - Sarasaviya Awards
- 2007 Sarasaviya Award for Best Up-coming actress - Himali Sayurangi
- 2007 Sarasaviya Award for Best playback singer - Kasun Kalhara
- 2007 Sarasaviya Merit Award - Hemantha Iriyagama

== Re-release ==
After its huge popularity in 2007, the director Giriraj Kaushalya discussed about the re-release of the film. With that initiation, the film was re-released at the MPI, LFD and Tharu circuit cinemas on 4 February 2010.
