= Suraj Mapa =

Sri Lankan actor

Suraj Mapa සුරාජ් මාපා
- Born: Mapa Mudiyanselage Suraj Laksiri; 2 January 1980 (age 46); Kandy, Sri Lanka
- Education: Trinity College, Kandy
- Occupations: Actor, Dramatist, Choreographer
- Years active: 2002–present
- Mother: Dayani Mapa
- Awards: Most Popular Actor

Mapa Mudiyanselage Suraj Laksiri (born on 2 January 1980 as සුරාජ් මාපා) [Sinhala]), popularly known as Suraj Mapa, is an actor in Sri Lankan cinema and television as well as a Teledrama producer, model, dancer, and a choreographer. Mapa is best known for the roles in many television serials such as Olu, Pooja, and Haara Kotiya. Apart from acting, he owns partnership in the brand named Elsa Clothing.

== Personal life ==
He was born on 2 January 1980 in Kandy, Sri Lanka as the youngest of the family with two elder sisters. His father was a businessman and his mother was a housewife. He completed education from Trinity College, Kandy and did his Advance Level examination in 1999.

Then, Mapa attended a course in Hotel Management earning a Diploma in Hotel Management and worked for one year in his father's hotel – ‘Hotel Zurich Park’. He also studied at IDM and gained a Diploma in Computer Studies. During this period he worked for ‘Suntel’ as a customer care executive. As a model he has walked the ramp for Lou Ching Wong the fashion designer and for Nayana the popular hair dresser. Later he obtained qualifications in Marketing through SLIM.

His father died on 13 July 2016 and mother Dayani Mapa died on 17 August 2018 by a blood clot in the brain. His mother's sister, Suneetha Ratnayake was a popular dancer.

== Acting career ==
Mapa started his acting career in 2000 with the television serial Mage Sanda Oba directed by Prasanna Vithanage. He was starring the main role, which gained him large popularity and also selected for Upcoming Actor award in year 2002. During the very early stage of his career, he appeared in the serial Suriya Daruwo in 2002, which made him popular. He was also nominated as the Best Upcoming Actor in 2003, for the lead role in the serial Olu directed by Shirly P. Delankawala which made his turning point in the career. In the serial, he was starring a role of a young English Teacher named "Asanka". Later he won the award for the Most Popular Actor in both Sumathi Awards and Raigam Tele'es awards in 2005 and 2006 for the role. In 2005, he won the award for the most popular Sri Lankan actor in the UAE. Then he acted in the serial Pooja directed by Eranga Senarathne. In the serial, he played the role "Nirmala", a famous Writer who was leading a battle to save his child and the family.

With that success, he played several lead roles particularly as the lover in the serials such as; Sapumali, Poojasanaya, Ridee Siththam, Sepalika, Muthu Wessak, and Mage Sanda Oba. In 2016, he acted in the serial Kalu Araliya by performing multiple roles as famous actor Vishwa Disanayaka, servant Muni and a disabled person. Then he was nominated for the best actor award for the serial as well. In 2017, he acted in the sci-fi serial Lokantharayo directed by Thushara Thennakon, where Mapa screened dual roles. In the same year, he appeared in the popular crime serial Haara Kotiya where he played the role of gang leader "Nepolion". In 2018, he acted in the serial Amuthu Rasikaya with the role of "Vijitha", where he obtained award nominations.

Mapa started his film career with a supportive role in 2004 comedy film, Clean Out directed by Roy de Silva. He also acted in Belgium film Semi Tower. He acted in the film Sikuru Hathe directed by Giriraj Kaushalya, which became a blockbuster hit and became the highest-grossing film in 2007. In 2019, he appeared in the film Uththara.

Apart from television serials and films, he also acted in several single episode teledrama such as Sansara Sewanali - Podi Hamuduruwo and Thunkal Sihinaya as well the telefilm Mathaka Sihina.

=== Notable television serials ===
- Aathma Senehasa
- Amuthu Rasikaya
- Baloli
- Chuttey
- Daangale
- Degammediyawa
- Haara Kotiya
- Handewa
- Heenayaki Me Adare
- Indrachapa
- Isuru Bawana
- Jeewa Chakra
- Kaluaraliya
- Lokantharayo
- Mage Sanda Oba
- Mini Kirana
- Muthu Wessak
- Nethra
- Pini
- Pinikunatuwa
- Pooja
- Poojasanaya
- Ridee Siththam
- Sanda Siththam
- Sepalika
- Sihinayak Paata Paatin
- Sihina Cinderella
- Sihini
- Suddilage Kathawa
- Surya Daruwo
- Susum Rasthiyaduwa
- Thanamalvila Kollek
- Tharu Malee
- Tharu Prabha
- Uthum Pathum
- Veeduru Mal

== Dancing career ==
Mapa started dancing at school age and excels in Latin American dance. He studied dancing under Neomi Rajaratnam and performed at many events both locally and internationally such as "Footwork Dance Sport 2002". Mapa's talented in Latin Dance. Mapa always works on positioning himself as an actor with dancing capabilities.

His maiden dance show titled Elements with Surya was held at Bishop's college auditorium on 14–15 May 2010 at 7 p.m. On 27 February 2016, Mapa organized a dance show with over fifty dancers. The show was held at the Dharmaraja College Auditorium from 10.00 am and 6.30 pm. In 2013, he contested for the reality program Derana City of Dance, The Ultimate Level telecast by TV Derana and in 2018 Hiru Mega Stars telecast by Hiru TV. In the same year, he learned Kandyan dance traditions under Kulasiri Budawatta and became a Ves Kandyan dancer in 2014.

In 2015, Mapa started Suraj Dance Academy where he conducts workshops in Colombo & Kandy.

== Other work ==
Mapa contributed as a producer for the serial Dagammadiyawa. He was also starring in it and was awarded a Merit Award in Sumathi Awards Ceremony. In 2008, he hosted the reality shown Sirasa Dancing Stars season 1 together with Nirosha Perera, which later won the most popular award in 2008. Apart from that, he acts as the Head of Sales & Marketing for Elsa Clothing brand which was launched together with 2 other partners.

== Filmography ==
Key
†	Denotes films that have not yet been released

Year	Film	Role	Ref.
2004	Clean Out	Pathale Sudha 'Sam'	
2007	Sikuru Hathe	Vidyartha	
2008	Akasa Kusum		
2010	Uththara	Shanilka	
2011	Suseema	Ranga	
2015	Singa Machan Charlie	Romeo	
2018	Yama Raja Siri	In item song	
2019	Ginnen Upan Seethala	Vijitha Ranaweera	
2026	Father		

== Awards and accolades ==
=== Sumathi Awards ===
Year	Nominee / work	Award	Result
2007	People's vote	Most Popular Actor	Won
2011	Degammediyawa	Merit Award	Won
