= Pubudu Chathuranga =

Sri Lankan actor, model and screenplay writer

Pubudu Chathuranga පුබුදු චතුරංග
- Born: Eththiligoda Vidana Gamage Pubudu Chathuranga; 12 November 1982 (age 43); Galle, Sri Lanka
- Education: Richmond College
- Occupations: Actor, presenter, model, screenplay writer, motivational speaker
- Years active: 2002–present
- Height: 5 ft 9 in (175 cm)
- Spouse: Mashi Siriwardena (m. 2018)
- Parents: E. V. G Somasiri (father); Lalitha Indrani Weththasinghe (mother)

Eththiligoda Vidana Gamage Pubudu Chathuranga (born 12 November 1982: Sinhala: පුබුදු චතුරංග), popularly known as Pubudu Chathuranga, is an actor in Sri Lankan cinema, theater and television. He is also worked as a model, TV presenter and a screenplay writer.

== Personal life ==
Pubudu was born on 12 November 1982 in Kithulampitiya, Galle. His mother, Lalitha Indrani Weththasinghe, is a housewife born in Colombo who moved to Galle after marrying his father, E.V.G Somasiri, in the 1970s. He has one sister, Dushanthi Thamodini who is married to Sisira Kalansooriya. The name Pubudu means "blossoming of wisdom", and Chathuranga stands for any four noble things.

Pubudu attended Richmond College in Galle, which his father had also attended. As a school boy he has won the primary best student award of his school and got the best results in Ordinary Level. After Advanced Level He was selected to receive higher education as a candidate for a Higher National Diploma in Engineering (HNDE), and he moved to Colombo. However, he became more involved in the arts field than the engineering field.

Since 2016, he has been dated to model Mashi Siriwardene. In 2017, Mashi crowned as NSBM Avurudu Kumariya. They married on 15 March 2018 where the ceremony was held at Cinnamon Grand Hotel, Colombo. Mashi later became an actress, who made a supportive appearances in the films The Newspaper and Nihanda Sewaneli.

== Career ==
His school drama performances started in grade 1, where he acted in a comedic street play, Mahadana Muththa. At the age of fourteen, he appeared in other stage dramas at the school, including ten English plays, for example Julius Caesar. Pubudu organized his own theater group when he was in grade 12 and carried out his own theatrical productions, such as Miriguwa and Histhanak. He started his career by appearing on stage in Trojan Kanthavo by Dharmasiri Bandaranayake. He then moved to television with a teledrama Samanala Kandawura directed by Prof. Ariyarathna Athugala. Pubudu became popular, landing recurring roles in TV series such as the soap opera Sara (2006). Chathuranga won best actor award at Raigam Tele'es for his role in One Way. He also won award for tele drama Kanyawi and nominated several times as the most popular actor in TV.

He made his film debut in 2004 with the comedic youth film Hiripoda Wassa and received his first notable critical award for this performance through the Sarasaviya Awards. Pubudu obtained recognition for his subsequent work in supporting roles in Tharaka Mal (2006) and Dancing Stars (2007), as well as a leading role in Kanyavi (2007), for which he received a merit award from SIGNIS Awards. In 2008, he made an international appearance in Uberto Pasolini's award winning movie Machan. He has been nominated for best actors awards several times, and won the Best Actor (2012) in The Derana Lux Film awards for his performance in the movie Challenges in 2011 for the character Ranuk, a teenager who is facing the challenges of becoming an adult, directed by Udayakantha Warnasuriya. He has also won the Best Actor Award in 2017 at Raigam Tele'es for his character 'Dr. Thejana', a psychiatrist in the television drama One Way directed by Lalith Rathnayake in 2016.

The teledrama 'Ran Samanalayo' in which Pubudu made lead role became the most popular teledrama in Sri Lanka for two years. Chathuranga has also been awarded Best Actor in a negative role in 2018 for his performance in the film Sakkarang directed by a veteran director Dharmasena Pathiraja. He has won the best outstanding auxiliary actors award in SIGNIS award for his outstanding performance in the movie Parawarthana. In 2019, he won the best actor in a Comedy role for the movie Maya 3D in Presidential Film Awards. Other than these major achievements he has nominated many times and won several award in other award ceremonies as well.

Since the 2000s, Pubudu has appeared in 20 movies with locally and internationally recognized directors. His stage career became successful after he appeared in Nari Burathi (2012), where he played the main role. His writing career started in childhood and prospered after he wrote the movie Sara, It is the first Sri Lankan movie which is written based out of a TV serial. As a scriptwriter, he wrote the popular blockbusters Pravegaya and Maaya 3D.

He also appeared as a TV presenter, with successful musical chats such as Sikurada Rae (Derana TV). He also hosted Hiru Golden Film Awards two times. In addition, teledramas such as Suddi, Kasiwatta and Modarawella became very popular in 2019.

=== Notable teledramas ===
Year	Teledrama	Role	Ref.
2006	Sara		
2007	Lokkaiya		
2008	Gajamuthu		
2008	Wasanthaya Aran Evith		
2010	Ran Samanalayo		
2011	Namak Nati Minisa		
2012	Bindunu Sith		
2014	Bhavanthara		
2016	One way		
2017	Devliye		
2017	Modara Walla		
2019	Sudde		
2019	Modara Bambaru		
2021	Aaliya	Ashen	
2021	Sapthambaraye Diga Dawasak		
2021	Visi Eka		
2023	Jeewithaye Eka Dawasak	Dileepa	
2024	Wow Madam	Prince	
	Adisi Nadiya		
2025	Chanchala Rekha		
2026	Thappara Katta		

== Filmography ==
=== As actor ===
Key
†	Denotes films that have not yet been released

Year	Film	Role	Notes	Ref.
2006	Hiripoda Wassa	Sithum	Performance award in Sarasaviya awards	
2007	Tharaka Mal	Parthipal		
2008	Machan	Spoilt son		
2008	Dancing Star			
2008	Paya Enna Hiru Se	Sudu Malli		
2009	Kanyavi	Madhawa	Performance award in SIGNIS	
2010	Suwanda Denuna Jeewithe	Prasad		
2010	Sara	Denuka		
2011	Sinhawalokanaya	Cyril		
2011	Challenges	Ranuk	Best Actor Derana Film Awards	
2012	Super Six	Bhathiya		
2013	Samanala Sandhawaniya	Vadisha s' elder brother		
2014	Parawarthana	Siripala		
2015	Pravegaya	Wasantha		
2016	Cindrella			
2016	July 7	Pubudu		
2016	Sakkarang	Milton	Best Actor in Negative role – Derana Film Awards	
2016	Maya 3D	Malan		
2017	Devani Warama	Kusal Karaliyadda		
2017	Seema Na Akase	Isuru		
2018	Eka Dawasaka Api	Vimukthi		
2018	Davena Vihagun	Brothel owner		
2018	Girivassipura	King Sri Vikrama Rajasinha		
2019	Goree	Disabled Ex-cop		
2019	Husma	Namal		
2019	President Super Star	Lichchawi King		
2020	The Newspaper	Newspaper seller		
2021	Hathara Varan	Police officer		
2021	Nihada Sewaneli			
2021	Underpants Thief	Sam		
2022	Rashmi	Amal		
2023	Deweni Yuddhaya	Kamal Yapabandara		
2023	Kandak Sema			
2025	Elada Braa			
TBA	Surangana Lowin Awilla †			
TBA	MAA †			
TBA	Tharu Athara †			
TBA	Edath Dinum Adath Dinum †			
TBA	Replica †	Ashan		
TBA	Adare Aththamai †			
TBA	Devi Sambula †			

=== As Director ===
Year	Film	Notes	Ref.
TBD	Kuna	Directorial Debut	

=== As Writer ===
Year	Film	Notes	Ref.
2015	Pravegaya	Dialogue Writer	
2016	Maya 3D	Screenplay Writer	
TBD	Kuna	Screenplay Writer	

== Awards ==
=== 31st Sarasaviya Awards ===
Year	Nominee / work	Award	Result
2006	Hiripoda Wassa	Merit Award	Won

=== SIGNIS Awards ===
Year	Nominee / work	Award	Result
2009	Kanyavi	Merit Award	Won

=== 19th Presidential Awards ===
Year	Nominee / work	Award	Result
2016	Maya 3D	Best Actor in a Comedy Role	Won

=== Raigam Tele'es ===
Year	Nominee / work	Award	Result
2017	One Way	Best Teledrama Actor	Won

=== Derana Film Awards ===
Year	Nominee / work	Award	Result
2012	Challenges	Best Actor	Won
2017	Sakkarang	Best Actor in a Negative Role	Won
