= Sakman Maluwa =

Sakman Maluwa සක්මන් මළුව
- Directed by: Sumitra Peries
- Written by: Lester James Peries
- Based on: Short story by Godfrey Gunatilake
- Produced by: Ceylon Theatres Limited
- Starring: Sanath Gunathilake; Vasanthi Chathurani; Kanchana Mendis
- Cinematography: K. A. Dharmasena
- Edited by: Ravindra Guruge
- Music by: W. D. Amaradeva
- Release date: 28 November 2003
- Running time: 110 minutes
- Country: Sri Lanka
- Language: Sinhala

Sakman Maluwa (Pleasure Garden) (Sinhala: සක්මන් මළුව) is a 2003 Sri Lankan Sinhala drama film directed by Sumitra Peries and produced by Ceylon Theatres, the oldest cinema production company in Asia. It stars Sanath Gunathilake, Kanchana Mendis and newcomer Dinidu Jagoda in lead roles along with Iranganie Serasinghe and Daya Tennakoon. Music composed by W. D. Amaradeva. The film received mostly positive reviews from critics. It is the 1023rd Sri Lankan film in the Sinhala cinema.

Initially titled as Samanala Uyana by director, popular poet Arisen Ahubudu found that the name was inauspicious. In December 2003, a book titled “Lankeeya Cinemawe Sakman Maluwa” was published by young film critique, Ajith Galappaththi on the film to celebrate 75th anniversary of Ceylon Theatres. The film was screened at Fukoka International Film Festival, Japan in 2004.

== Cast ==
- Sanath Gunathilake as Tissa
- Vasanthi Chathurani
- Kanchana Mendis as Prema
- Iranganie Serasinghe as Tissa's mother
- Daya Thennakoon as Gardener
- Rangana Premaratne
- Dinidu Jagoda as Ranjan
