= Ekamath Eka Rateka =

Ekamath Eka Rateka එකමත් එක රටෙක
- Directed by: Sanath Gunathilake
- Written by: Sanath Gunathilake
- Based on: French novel Pour une nuit d'amour
- Produced by: S.G Enterprises
- Starring: Sanath Gunathilake; Nirosha Perera; Chandani Seneviratne
- Cinematography: Lal Wickramarachchi
- Edited by: Ravindra Guruge
- Music by: Premasiri Khemadasa
- Release date: 5 June 2009
- Country: Sri Lanka
- Language: Sinhala

Ekamath Eka Rateka (Once Upon a Time) (Sinhala: එකමත් එක රටෙක) is a 2009 Sri Lankan Sinhala drama film directed by Sanath Gunathilake and produced by Janaka Ramanayake for S.G Enterprises. It stars Sanath Gunathilake and Nirosha Perera in lead roles along with Chandani Seneviratne and Semini Iddamalgoda. Music composed by Premasiri Khemadasa. The film is influenced by French novel Pour une nuit d'amour by Émile Zola. It is the 1126th Sri Lankan film in the Sinhala cinema.

== Plot ==
The main role of this story is a pretty young woman who belongs to a rich, high class family. She is an apple in a provincial city where she lived with her parents. In front of her bungalow, lives a hideous, middle-aged clerk with his pet dog. He is a very reserved person who has no friends and family. This man sees this young lady often, fell in love with her beauty and was dreaming to marry her someday even though his age, look and social status were not up to her family status at all. This girl, who is a sexually dominating character, secretly continues a relationship with a young handsome guy who is the son of their old housemaid who is still serving them in the bungalow. Both this girl and the guy were raised together in this house during their childhood and he later went out of the town to study to become a lawyer. He returns to the town recently, that's when they began their secret relationship. As this girl was displaying her dominate characteristics from her childhood, their relationship was not based on love but lust. However, they both enjoyed the feeling of viciousness in their love. One day the guy gets aroused with her speech and behaviors attempting to rape her, she mistakenly hits him that he ends up hitting his head on an edge of the bed and dies. Now that she realizes she did a mistake, she waves at the hideous clerk who was living in front of her house to come and see her. The man who was being ignored by this woman for so long gets so excited with her invitation goes to her house and offers to help her clean the dead body. The dominating lady feels so helpless and requests the middle-aged clerk to go and throw the dead body of the lawyer to a distant lake and promised to sleep with him one night to return the favor.

== Cast ==
- Sanath Gunathilake
- Nirosha Perera
- Roshan Ravindra
- Chandani Seneviratne
- Semini Iddamalgoda
- Leonie Kotelawala
- Tony Ranasinghe in guest appearance
- Himali Sayurangi
- Damitha Abeyratne
- Kumara Thirimadura
- Chandana Silva
- Kanchana Kodithuwakku
