= Ran Samanalayo =

- Official Poster for Ran Samanalayo
- Also known as: Sinhala: රන් සමනළයෝ
- Genre: Romance; Comedy
- Written by: Priyal Weerasinghe
- Directed by: Sandaruwan Jayawickrama
- Starring: Pubudu Chathuranga; Asha Edirisinghe; Roshan Ranawana; Saranga Disasekara; Sachini Ayendra
- Country of origin: Sri Lanka
- Original language: Sinhala
- No. of episodes: 250

Production
- Producers: Jayanthe Karunarathne; Nilantha Karunarathne
- Running time: Monday to Friday at 8:00pm

Original release
- Network: Independent Television Network
- Release: 8 June 2011 – 25 May 2012

Related
- Pabalu; Ridee Siththam

Ran Samanalayo (Sinhala: රන් සමනළයෝ) is a Sri Lankan television drama broadcast by Independent Television Network. The series first aired on 8 June 2011 and concluded on 25 May 2012. This is a mega hit of Sandaruwan Jayawickrama after Sulanga. Ran Samanalayo has been rated by many surveys as the most popular teledrama at 8:00pm. Actor Saranga Disasekara was awarded as the most popular actor of the year 2011 at Raigam Tele'es for his acting in this teledrama. Ran Samanalayo is special for its attractive color combination of costumes and other relevant things.

== Story ==
Samanali, an innocent beautiful girl in her twenties works as a dancing teacher of a convent. She lives with her mother and grandmother. Her grandmother always accuses Samanali's mother due to a past incident. So Samanali is worrying about that and also she thinks that she has a big responsibility of her mother's and grandmother's lives. So she is living a strict life and she hasn't had any close relationship with a boy.

But Sihina is a rich handsome boy, enjoying his life freely. He just came back from abroad after completing his studies. Meanwhile, the convent, where Samanali works is going to organize a concert. So teachers have a tough time to get ready for that and they also try to find a sponsor in order to get a financial support. Then Sihina comes forward to take that responsibility. One day he comes to the convent for that matter. He accidentally sees Samanali and falls in love from the first sight. This is the start of the story.

== Cast and characters ==
- Pubudu Chathuranga as Sihina
- Asha Edirisinghe as Samanali
- Roshan Ranawana as Deneth
- Saranga Disasekara as Nilanga
- Sachini Ayendra as Menuka aka Menu
- Mihira Sirithilaka as Chethiya
- Robin Fernando as Devanarayana aka Deva
- Sriyani Amarasena as Vinitha
- Janak Premalal as Prem
- Wijeratne Warakagoda
- Anton Jude
- Sajeewa Malmarachchi as Seththi
- Thushara Jayasuriya as Wicky
- Seetha Kumari
- Maureen Charuni

== Music ==
- Theme Song: Thurul Wenna Asai Hendewe by Bathiya and Santhush

== Awards ==
- Most popular actor of the year 2011 (Raigam Tele'es): Saranga Disasekara

== Songs ==
- Sundarai Aththamai Jeewithe Oba Thamai
- Eka Malakwath Suwanda Na Oba Tharam

== See also ==
- Independent Television Network
- Bonda Meedum (Teledrama)
