= Kanyavi =

Kanyavi කන්‍යාවි
- Directed by: Siritunga Perera
- Written by: Siritunga Perera
- Produced by: Cine Vision Lanka Films
- Starring: Sanath Gunathilake; Meena Kumari; Pubudu Chathuranga
- Cinematography: K. D. Dayananda
- Edited by: Stanley de Alwis
- Music by: Premasiri Khemadasa
- Distributed by: NFC Theaters
- Release date: 4 December 2009
- Country: Sri Lanka
- Language: Sinhala

Kanyavi (Sinhala: කන්‍යාවි) is a 2009 Sri Lankan Sinhala drama film directed by Siritunga Perera and produced by Indika Wijeratne for Cine Vision Lanka Films. It stars Sanath Gunathilake and Meena Kumari in lead roles along with Sathischandra Edirisinghe and Pubudu Chathuranga. Music composed by Nadeeka Guruge. The film introduced Dilani Madurasinghe to cinema for the first time. It is the 1132rd Sri Lankan film in the Sinhala cinema.

The film was successfully screened for 60 days at Ritz Borella and other NFC circuit cinema halls around the country.

== Cast ==
- Sanath Gunathilake as Janaka Senanayake
- Meena Kumari as Imaya Senanayake
- Dilani Madurasinghe as Kumari
- Sathischandra Edirisinghe as Janaka's father
- Pubudu Chathuranga as Madhava
- Hyacinth Wijeratne as Janaka's mother
- Himali Sayurangi as Tharushi Nadeesha
- Seetha Kumari as Somawathi
- Susila Kottage as Mrs. Charlot Sylvester
- Upali Keerthisena as Madhava's servant
- Kapila Sigera as Thug

== Soundtrack ==
No.	Title	Singer(s)	Length
1.	"Siyumali Piume"	Amarasiri Pieris
