= Sinahawa Atharin =

Sinahawa Atharin සිනහව අතරින්
- Directed by: Sanath Gunathilake
- Written by: Sanath Gunathilake
- Based on: Chaminda Perera
- Produced by: Sunil T. Films
- Starring: Sanath Gunathilake; Semini Iddamalgoda; Hashini Gonagala
- Cinematography: Sujith Nishantha
- Edited by: Nanda Jayakody
- Music by: Nirosha Virajini
- Distributed by: CEL Theatres
- Release date: 30 April 2015
- Country: Sri Lanka
- Language: Sinhala

Sinahawa Atharin (A Smile Through Sorrow) (Sinhala: සිනහව අතරින්) is a 2015 Sri Lankan Sinhala drama philosophical film directed by Sanath Gunathilake and produced by Sunil T. Frenando for Sunil T Films. It stars Sanath Gunathilake and Semini Iddamalgoda with Hashini Gonagala and Jayani Senanayake. The music was composed by Nirosha Virajini. It is the 1,226th film in the Sinhala cinema.

== Plot ==
The film opens as a Buddhist monk (previously Wimal) is travelling from an outrigger to a temple. The person in charge of duties in the temple (Alfred) enters the shrine room of the temple to find a young lady (Wimal's daughter Hasanthi) waiting there. After a short conversation with Alfred, Hasanthi (Hashini) meets the monk and tells him that she had come all the way from Canada to know about Mr. Wimal Wickramasinghe. As he is now a monk, she refuses to ask her questions from him because even though she was born in Canada, she was brought up as a Sinhala Buddhist girl. She gives the monk a notebook in which her questions were written. She requests the monk to read a letter from her mother Kumari (Semini). As the monk reads it, the letter evokes his memories of past.

Kumari is a Sinhala Buddhist lady who is married to a foreign man Richard Bertholamuz. She finds that Richard does not dedicate time to show her love and affection. One day she saw Wimal in a meeting in the temple which was shown in the beginning of the film. The chief monk introduces Wimal to the gathering. Her ever loving friend Kanthi (Jayani) reminds Kumari about the days she and friends were fond of Wimal as he was a beloved actor who acted as the lion in the school drama. Later, Wimal comes to Kumari's house to collect a letter regarding the foreign tour of the chief monk. She gets fond of him and frequently talks with him. Eventually she reveals her situation to Wimal. Meanwhile, she shares all this with her friend Kanthi who also talks with Wimal.

Later, she visits Wimal's place in Bolgoda and appears to be happier than ever. She gets closer and closer to Wimal that she even slept with him. Wimal gives Kumari the wedding ring which his father gave his mother. Little by little, Richard realizes that Kumari has a connection with Wimal. One day Wimal, Kumari and Kanthi meets together for dinner and Kanthi surprises Kumari by giving her a birthday cake. Wimal also gives her a saree and after that they arrive at Wimal's house. Wimal gives Kumari a birthday cake. At this moment, Kumari reveals Wimal that she is pregnant and Wimal is going to become a father. Wimal is startled as he hears this and his reaction upsets Kumari.

Richard tries to convince Kumari that he cares for her and he will try to become a good husband to her. He tells Kumari that she must be cautious as it is only two months since she has got pregnant. Kumari understands that Richard has started to behave in responsible manner. Wimal pleads to Richard to tell Kumari to visit him again. However, when he talked with her, she refused to live with him, saying she has noticed that Richard had understood her and she will continue to live with Richard as he had agreed to accept and bring up Wimal and Kumari's child as his own.

Hasanthi gives a letter which was written by Richard on the day of her coming of age. Richard had died of a heart attack when she was 17 years old. Richard has requested the letter to be given to Hasanthi when she is 21 years old. In the letter Richard tells that he wrote it in case something bad happens to his life. He reveals that Mr. Wimal is her biological father. Hashini becomes emotional and asks the monk why he neglected even the news about her birth. The monk (previously Wimal) says that he had asked Richard those days to tell him when her daughter is born, but Richard had lied to him that his daughter had died at the moment she was born. Hasanthi leaves the notebook and the ring Wimal gave her mother with the monk. The story ends as the monk throws those items into the water when he travels across the river by the outrigger to the monastery to continue his meditation. The fifth stanza (gatha) in Karaneeya meththa sutra is reminded at the end of the film.

== Cast ==
- Sanath Gunathilake as Wimal Wickramasinghe
- Semini Iddamalgoda as Kumari
- Hashini Gonagala as Hasanthi Wickramasinghe
- Jayani Senanayake as Kanthi
- Alfred Perera as Alfred
- Kris Henry as Richard Bertholamuz
- Robin Fernando in a cameo appearance
- Nadeeka Gunasekara in a cameo appearance

== Soundtrack ==
No.	Title	Lyrics	Singer(s)	Length
1.	"Arabuma Kothanada"	Sanath Gunathilake	Nirosha Virajini
2.	"Obe Suwanda Rali"		Amila Perera (3 minutes and 25 seconds)
3.	"Vitin Vita"	Nirosha Virajini	Nirosha Virajini
4.	"Siravi Thibuna"	Nirosha Virajini	Nirosha Virajini (length 3 minutes and 55 seconds)
