= Jaya Sri =

Sri Lankan pop and reggae duo

Jaya Sri ජය ශ්‍රී
- Origin: Negombo, Sri Lanka
- Genres: Hip hop; reggae; reggae fusion
- Years active: 1990–present
- Labels: Torana Music, T-Series, MEntertainment, Lahari Music, Universal Music
- Members: Rohitha Jayalath; Rohan Jayalath; Sumal Fernando; Bidroho Faham; Moses Afanyi; Herb Pirker; Parvez Syed
- Past members: Aruna Lian
- Website: http://jayasrimusic.com

Jaya Sri (Sinhala: ජය ශ්‍රී) are a Sri Lankan reggae consisting of Rohitha Jayalath and Rohan Jayalath, who are twins, along with five more members to form the full band. Considered one of the most commercially successful music duos in Sri Lanka, Jaya Sri has received global success in many European countries particularly with their literal mixed reggae, hip hop style modern infusion in taking Western and Sinhala music.

== Personal life ==
They were born in Madampe, (Chilaw), Sri Lanka. Then they moved to Nattandiya. They are both twins. Rohitha is three hours older than Rohan. His father Maktildes Jayalath was also a musician. They completed both O/L and A/L education from Maris Stella College, Negombo.

== Musical career ==
When the twins were at Montessori age, their grandfather Eusabius Subasinha presented them with two guitars. This led them to master the different levels of music at a young age. They joined the school band with two Marist brothers. While doing A/Ls, they started to form a band and perform professionally. Then they formed the first band, called Serendib, which was managed by their father. The band performed in the tourist hotel circuit in the Negombo area.

After completing his education, Rohitha migrated to Austria, Vienna in 1989 to complete his architectural studies at the University of Fine Arts Vienna. Two years later in 1991, his brother Rohan also migrated to Austria and they formed the band again. During this period, they were able to advance their music careers. In 1992–93, the duo signed with Sony Music Europe and made the first ever project CON-DOM with its singles. They entered the European charts as the first ever Sri Lankans to be in 20 countries' sales charts. With this boost, they started to perform with many international bands and toured around the world.

Meanwhile, the duo made changes with many music projects including JAYA3, Decadance, Rootsman band, Banditos Bonitos and Global Deejays- Ravers on Dope. In 1999, the duo formed the musical band Jaya Sri. Meanwhile, Rohitha made the seven-member World Reggae Band which is based in Europe, Vienna and Austria, and whose band members are drawn from three continents, Asia, Africa, and Europe. The band included Aruna Lian (lead guitar), Sumal (drums), Moses (percussion), and Parvesh (keyboards), along with Rohitha and Rohan. Later Aruna left the group for personal reasons and was replaced by Mathias Kouba, and then with Bidu and Herb (lead guitar).

In 2003, Jaya Sri were awarded the Austrian World Music Award and the Austrian Grammy Amadeus for "Ravers on Dope" (Global Deejays) best dance single. In 2004, they performed in the Vienna City Festival with many international bands on stage including Habib Koité, Bongo Maffin and Tatro Trono. In early June 2004, the band was featured along with the reggae musician Alpha Blondy and Solar System at the annual Reggae Mountain Festival held in the Alps mountain region of Tirol in Austria. This "We Remember Bob Marley Tour" featured other reggae singers such as Exodus, P.A.T. Yardman, Anthony Cox and Inna Valle.

In May 2005, they flew to Paris to perform at the Tsunami Aid Concert organized by the Negombo Association to raise charity funds for people affected by he 2004 Tsunami tragedy in Sri Lanka. In mid-2005, they played concerts at the Summer Akadamy Festival in Europe, the Greifenstein Openair and the Asian Night. In late 2005, the band toured Italy, Germany, Cyprus, South Korea and Canada and the United States, organized by Entertainment Unlimited Toronto, Canada. Along with the full band, they returned to Sri Lanka three times and performed at the Rock Meets Reggae Concert. In 2008, Jaya Sri concerts were held at the Fest der Begegnung cultural festival in St. Polten, Afrika Festival in August in Vienna's Danube island where they toured with 'Saamaya-Peace Tour’ Summer Festivals around the Mediterranean.

In the subsequent years, Jaya Sri made four commercially successful albums with many hits. Meanwhile, they returned to Sri Lanka for many musical projects. They composed many theme songs for films and teledramas such as Boodee Keerthisena's film Mille Soya, Pitasakwala Kumarayai Pancho Hathai, Nimnayaka Hudekalawa, Sathya, Rumassala, Oscar-nominated Uberto Pasolini's film Machan, and Chamara Janaraj Peiris's television serials Piyavi and Raahu. In the international arena, they had hits with renowned artists and bands such as Ziggy Marley, UB40, Third World, Jimmy Cliff, Inner Circle, Don Carlos, Shaggy, Soft Cell, The Temptations, Alpha Blondy, Falco, La Bouche and Gentleman.

In 2010, the band performed in Europe's biggest festivals and venues such as Reggaejam, Summerjam, Ebreichsdorf Reggae Festival, Afrika Tage - African Days, Africult Open Air, and Donauinselfest in Austria, Germany and Italy. During these shows, they collaborated with the international artists such as The Wailers, Damian Marley, Angélique Kidjo, Marla Glen, Hans Söllner and Eliah Prophet. In the same year, some original songs of Jaya Sri such as "Mother Earth" and "Situkuamriye" were selected for the World Music Compilation CD Migrant Music Vienna, which was distributed by Lotus Records Worldwide. In 2016, they released the international music album Love with 15 solo hits. On 27 October 2016, Jaya Sri and Chitral Somapala together with Xotic band performed at Feel Sri Lanka 2016, the first single country exhibition in Maldives. The event took place at Male City Alimas Carnival Stage open air and on October 28 at Huduranfushi Island Resort.

Apart from music, the duo are engaged in many social service programs where they sell T-shirts, caps and jerseys during concerts. The money received is used to help the education of poor children in Sri Lanka.

== Controversies ==
Aruna (Aruna Lian) claimed all the top hit originals of the band, Jaya Sri, were mainly written and produced by him. There is an ongoing court case in Sri Lanka to determine the song rights. The group and their songs has a big fan base in Sri Lanka and now they have been divided in social media thanks to the dispute: some are supporting the twins, mentioning their unique stage presence and how they provide liveness to their songs, while others are supporting Aruna because, as an individual, his music skills and capabilities are far ahead from the two brothers. After Aruna left the band, no popular tracks were released and fans who are supporting to Aruna, highlight this fact as an true indicator of who owns the songs. However, Rohitha and Rohan have many media friends, including childhood friend and film maker Boodie Keerthisena, and have been lobbying a lot in social media and main stream media to get the sympathy of fans in the time of court case. Rohitha and Rohan come from the Negombo music scene, while Aruna was born in down south but soon moved to Kandy and studied in Kandy until he started music in Colombo and then moved to Germany.

== Discography ==
=== Albums ===
2000	Mod Goviya
2002	Sundari
2006	Peace
2016	Love
