= Sanath Gunathilake =

Sri Lankan film actor and film director (born 1955)

- සනත් ගුණතිලක
- Born: Somsiri Sanath Julien Gunatilake; 27 October 1955 (age 71); Kandy, Sri Lanka
- Education: Kingswood College
- Occupation: Actor
- Years active: 1980–present
- Known for: Aravinda in Viragaya
- Spouse: Janaki Wijerathne (m. 2025; sep. 2026)
- Parents: Hector Gunatilake (father); Grace Goonetileke (mother)

Somsiri Sanath Julien Gunatilake (Sinhala: සනත් ගුණතිලක; born 27 October 1955), popularly known as Sanath Gunatilake, is a Sri Lankan actor, director, screenwriter and former politician. Known for his versatility across multiple genres, he has had a career in the Sri Lankan film industry spanning over four decades. Gunatilake served as a member of the Western Provincial Council as a member of the United National Party and later held the position of media head for President Chandrika Bandaranaike Kumaratunga.

== Early life ==
Gunatilake was born on 27 October 1955 in Mulgampola, Kandy, Sri Lanka, into a middle-class family. His father, Hector Gunatilake, was a lawyer, and his mother, Grace Goonetileke, was a teacher. He has stated that his father was an avid cinema enthusiast, which influenced his early interest in the arts. Gunatilake received his education at Kingswood College, Kandy.

Gunatilake initially worked as a chemistry teacher. He later moved to Colombo in search of new career opportunities, leaving behind his tuition classes in Kandy.

== Film career ==
Gunatilake made his film debut in 1978 with Situ Kumariyo, directed by Vijaya Dharmasiri. However, before its release, his second film, Ganga Addara, was screened, followed by Sathweni Dawasa. After Situ Kumariyo, his next film, Vajira, was released.

His breakthrough role came with Ganga Addara, directed by Sumitra Peries, which marked a turning point in his acting career. He later gained widespread recognition for his portrayal of Aravinda in Viragaya, a performance that earned him Best Actor awards at every major film festival in Sri Lanka. Gunatilake has appeared in several notable films, including Kedapatha, Palama Yata, Doorkada Marawa, and Rajya Sevaya Pinisai.

In addition to his more dramatic roles, Gunatilake appeared in several mainstream films alongside Vijaya Kumaratunga, Jeewan Kumaratunga, and Ranjan Ramanayake. His film credits include Koti Waligaya, Dinuma, Raja Wedakarayo, Nommara 17, Obatai Priye Adare, and Inspector Geetha.

== Personal life ==
In 2025 he was married to former actress and businesswoman Janaki Wijerathne. She is the vice president of Lyca Productions. They were separated in 2026.

== Filmography ==
Key
†	Denotes films that have not yet been released

Year	Film	Role	Ref.
1980	Ganga Addara	Ranjith	
1981	Situ Kumariyo		
1981	Vajira	Newton	
1981	Sathweni Dawasa	Alphonso	
1981	Sathkulu Pauwa		
1981	Saranga		
1981	Aradhana		
1981	Amme Mata Samawenna	Wasantha	
1982	Yahalu Yeheli	Pujitharatne	
1982	Thani Tharuwa	Tharanga	
1982	Ridee Nimnaya	Rathnapala	
1982	Nawatha Hamu Wemu		
1982	Kiri Suwanda		
1982	Kele Mal	Chandana	
1982	Chathu Madhura	Sunil	
1983	Sivu Ranga Sena		
1983	Sister Mary		
1983	Kaliyugaya		
1984	Thaththai Puthai	Saliya	
1984	Shirani		
1984	Batti	Suren Hamu	
1984	Sathi Puja	Kapila	
1984	Sasara Chethana		
1984	Podi Ralahami		
1984	Maya		
1984	Maala Giravi		
1984	Dewani Gamana	Saman	
1985	Vasity Kella		
1985	Mihidum Salu	Doctor Senaka	
1985	Kiri Madu Wel		
1985	Chalitha Rangali		
1985	Aya Waradida Oba Kiyanna		
1985	Araliya Mal	Chandana	
1986	Prarthana		
1986	Maldeniye Simiyon	Justin	
1986	Mal Warusa	Jagath Weerasuriya	
1986	Koti Valigaya		
1986	Dinuma	Sarath Jayathilaka	
1986	Avurududa	Dhanushka	
1987	Viragaya	Aravinda	
1987	Thaththi Man Adarei		
1987	Randamwel		
1987	Raja Wedakarayoo	Ranjan	
1987	Obatai Priye Adare	Amith	
1987	Mangala Thegga		
1987	Kawuluva		
1988	Satana		
1988	Rasa Rahasak	Sanath / Wickrama	
1988	Chandingeth Chandiya	Dharmadasa	
1989	Okkoma Rajavaru		
1989	Nommara 17	Naatha	
1989	Kedapathaka Chaya	Piyathilaka	
	Sebaliyo	Nimal	
1990	Pem Raja Dahana	Sargent Ranasinghe	
1990	Palama Yata	Willie	
1990	Madhu Sihina	Suraj	
1990	Hodin Nathnam Narakin	Lokke	
1990	Dese Mal Pipila	Sumedha	
1991	Uthura Dakuna	Sanath	
1991	Love In Bangkok	Jagath	
1991	Dhanaya	Athula	
1991	Cheriyo Doctor	Chaminda Randenigala	
1992	Sisila Gini Gani	Harris Makalanda	
1992	Sinhayangeth Sinhaya	Mahesh	
1992	Sakkara Sooththara		
1992	Rumathiyai Neethiyai		
1992	Raja Daruwo	Sanath and his father (dual role)	
1992	Malsara Doni	Janaka Perera	
1992	Kiyala Wedek Nae		
1993	Sasara Serisaranathek Oba Mage		
1993	Nelum Ha Samanmalee		
1993	Madara Parasathu	Sirithunga	
1993	Chaya		
1993	Bambasara Bisawu		
1994	Sujatha new		
1994	Mee Haraka		
1994	Hello My Darlin		
1994	Aathmaa		
1995	Vairayen Vairaya		
1995	Inspector Geetha		
1995	Cheriyo Captain	Rahal	
1996	Veediye Veeraya		
1996	Sebae Mithura		
1996	Bawa Sasara		
1997	Duwata Mawaka Misa		
1998	Vimukthi		
1998	Eya Obata Barai		
1998	Dorakada Marawa	Priyantha	
2000	Sanda Yahanata	Jagath Hathurusinghe	
2000	Rajya Sevaya Pinisai	Minister Janaka Situbandara	
2000	Pem Kekula	Jerome	
2000	Chakraayudha		
2001	Oba Koheda Priye	George Madanayake	
2002	Somy Boys	Sanath	
2002	Agnidahaya	Ambanwala Rala	
2003	Wekande Walauwa	Gunapala	
2003	Sudu Kaluwara	Seemon Fernando 'Mudalali'	
2003	Sakman Maluwa	Tissa	
2003	Le Kiri Kandulu	Asela	
2004	Kangalal Kaidhu Sei	Pratap	Indian film
2004	Selamuthu Pinna	Sanath Sir	
2004	Randiya Dahara	Colonel Chanuka Hettiarachchi	
2004	Mille Soya	Sagara	
2004	Diya Yata Gindara	Sampath Harischandra	
2005	Sulanga	Senarathne	
2005	Asani Warsha	Minister Sirimanne	
2005	Sudu Kalu Saha Alu	Assa Peter	
2006	Nilambare	Nimal	
2006	Anjalika	Clifford Imbulgoda	
2006	Ammawarune	Doctor	
2006	Naga Kanya	Saman	
2007	Asai Man Piyabanna	Sapumal Senadheera	
2007	Aganthukaya	Chief Minister Simon Galagedara	
2008	Rosa Kale	Mr. Sooriyabandara	
2008	Pitasakwala Kumarayai Pancho Hathai		
2008	Nil Diya Yahana	Minister	
2008	Adaraye Namayen		
2008	Superstar	Ranjith Bandara	
2008	Siri Raja Siri	Principal	
2009	Kanyavi	Janaka	
2009	Ekamath Eka Rateka		
2009	Dancing Star		
2009	Alimankada	Major Kiriella	
2009	Ali Surathal	Rathnayaka	
2010	Uththara	Minister Niwanthudawa	
2010	Suwanda Denuna Jeewithe	cameo role	
2010	Mago Digo Dai	Minister Sathyapala	
2010	Kawulu Dora		
2010	Hadawatha Mal Yayai		
2011	Sinhawalokanaya	Gam Muladani	
2011	King Hunther	Nayakathuma	
2011	Gamani	Military Officer	
2011	Angara Dangara	Principal Pathirana	
2012	Sihinaya Dige Enna	Father	
2013	Doni	Bandu	
2013	Ira Laga Wadi	Saliya	
2013	Super Six	Preme, Sanath's brother	
2014	Samige Kathawa		
2014	Parapura	Minister Marasinghe	
2014	Kalpanthe Sihinayak	Mapa	
2015	Sinhaya	Minister	
2015	Sinahawa Atharin	Wimal	
2015	Pravegaya	Police Officer	
2017	Pani Makuluwo	Ranaweera	
2019	Sangile	Punchi Malli	
2019	Thiththa Aththa		
2019	Rush	Prof. Madugalle	
2019	President Super Star	Judge Daham Daranagama	
2021	Wassane Sihinaya		
2021	Uthuru Sulanga		
2023	Guththila	Makkali	
2023	Nattami Army		
2023	Rider		
2023	Yugathra	Willy Saparamadu	
2024	Ridee Seenu		
2024	Kambili	cameo	
2025	Rani	Lalith Athulathmudali	
2025	Mother Lanka		
2026	Dharmayuddhaya 2	Mangala Widanapathirana	
2026	Sura Detuwo		
2026	Sooriya Sulanga		
2026	Monara Vilak		
2026	Adaraneeya Tharuwak		
TBA	Pathikulaya †		
TBA	Cricket Sadu †		
TBA	Tikiri Kumaruge Mulleriya Satana †		

=== As a director ===
Year	Film	Ref.
2009	Ekamath Eka Rateka	
2015	Sinahawa Atharin	

== Awards ==
- Sarasaviya Awards for Best Actor - Sakman Maluwa
- Sarasaviya Awards for Best Actor - Palama Yata
- Sarasaviya Awards for Best Supporting Actor - Kedapathaka Chaya
- Sarasaviya Awards for Best Actor - Viragaya
