= Maya 3D =

- Theatrical release poster
- Sinhala: මායා 3D
- Directed by: Donald Jayantha
- Written by: Raja Sadesh Kumar
- Screenplay by: Pubudu Chathuranga
- Produced by: Raja Sadesh Kumar; Srimathi Sadesh Kumar
- Starring: Pududu Chathuranga; Ranjan Ramanayake; Shehara Hewadewa
- Cinematography: Ayeshmantha Hettiarachchi
- Edited by: Pravin Jayaratne
- Music by: Bathiya and Santhush
- Production company: Real Image Creations
- Distributed by: EAP Film Circuit
- Release date: 14 September 2016
- Country: Sri Lanka
- Language: Sinhalese

Maya (Sinhala: මායා 3D, lit. 'Illusion 3D', ) is a 2016 Sri Lankan Sinhala 3D horror comedy film directed by Donald Jayantha and co-produced by Raja Sadesh Kumar and Srimathi Sadesh Kumar. It stars Ranjan Ramanayake, Pubudu Chathuranga in lead roles along with Giriraj Kaushalya, Nilmini Kottegoda and Upeksha Swarnamali. It is the 1257th Sri Lankan film in the Sinhala cinema. The film is a shot-for-shot remake of the 2011 tamil film Kanchana.

== Plot ==
Malan is a jobless 25 year-old youth who spends his days playing cricket with friends. He suffers from phasmophobia and retreats to the safety of his home after sunset. His fear is so great he prefers to sleep with his widowed mother Geetha and have her accompany him to the bathroom at night, and also at the eating time. This creates major annoyance in the household, including Malan's brother Gamini, sister-in-law Nirmala and their children.

One night, Malan meets a girl named Shaini and flirts to gain her attraction, but did not reveal it. Shaini also had some attraction to Malan and she started to flirt around him as well. Meanwhile, One day, Malan and his friends are forced to abandon their usual cricket ground and find a new one; one friend select an abandoned ground which is rumored to be haunted. A bizarre weather change scares them away. Malan brings home his cricket stumps, which have been stained with blood from a buried corpse in the ground. He focuses on wooing Shaini, where she asked Malan to come to a dinner. But as he is fear for ghosts, he went to the hotel with all his family. At the dinner, however, Malan's mother agreed on their relationship and fixed a date to meet Shaini's family. In the following days, his mother and sister-in-law are witness to several paranormal phenomena at night; prominently a ghost haunting the hallways. They consult an exorcist, who suggests three rituals to test the presence of a spirit in their home.

1. To keep a coconut on a Rangoli and pray with chants. The coconut rotates on its own.

2. They keep an egg on a pan and see whether it turns color or explodes.

3. They leave a lit lamp and two drops of blood and leave the house. A ghost of a woman appears before them and licks the blood.

Geeta and Nirmala's suspicions turn out to be true after they perform the rituals and to chase the ghost away, they hire two priests to rid their home of the ghost. The priests, however, are conmen, and escape with their lives. That night, the ghost possesses Malan, who begins acting increasingly effeminate, alienating himself from Shaini and wearing women's clothes and jewelry. His family angrily confronts him, when it is revealed that there are actually three ghosts who have possessed him: a violent woman named Maya, a Tamil Hindu Man named Ramu, and a learning-disabled boy. With the possession, Malan kills a woman by hanging and a thug Wasantha by engraving him with his van. Malan's family ask a Buddhist monk, who successfully drives the spirit away from Malan's body. The ghost of the woman, trapped, reveals her story.

Past: As a young boy named Mayantha, he got disowned by his father when he discovered that Mayantha identifies as a transgender woman. Mayantha then got adopted by a Tamil man named Ramu, who has a son with a disability. Regretting that she couldn't become a doctor as she intended, she adopts another young trans person named Madhuri/Madhawi and works hard to support her financially. When Madhuri leaves to study medicine abroad, Maya buys a plot of land where Madhuri intended to construct a hospital for the poor. That ground is unlawfully taken by Minister Ashoka. Maya angrily confronts the minister, who cunningly kills her. He also kills Ramu and his son. Before she died, she vowed to kill minister, his wife, and his henchmen Shantha. The bodies are then buried in Maya's own ground.

Present: The monk sympathizes with her, but remains duty-bound and traps her. After hearing her story, Malan is touched; risking the danger, he allows Maya to possess him once again. Malan/Maya confronts the minister, and disposes of his henchmen gruesomely. The minister seeks refuge in a Kali temple which Maya is forbidden from; but she asks the deity for justice and manages to chase him inside the temple. The three spirits combined kill the minister. A few years later, Malan has constructed the hospital for Dr. Madhuri as per Maya's wishes. It is revealed that Maya exists symbiotically in Malan's body to help him out when the need rises.

== Cast ==
- Pubudu Chathuranga as Malan
- Ranjan Ramanayake as Maya/ Mayantha
- Shehara Hewadewa as Shaini
- Giriraj Kaushalya as Gamini
- Nihal Fernando as Ramu
- Sujeewa Priyalal as Madhuri/Madhawi
- Nilmini Kottegoda as Geetha
- Sarath Chandrasiri as Kapuwa
- Wasantha Kumaravila as Shantha
- Ishan Gammudali as Buddhist monk
- Somy Rathnayake as Principal
- Upeksha Swarnamali as Nirmala
- Srimal Wedisinghe as Minister Ashoka
- Mihira Sirithilaka as Ramu's son
- Kumara Thirimadura as Maya's father
- Damitha Abeyratne as Shantha's fiancée
- Anura Bandara Rajaguru as Swami
- Maureen Charuni as Hansi's mother
- Ramani Siriwardena as Shaini's mother
- Nandana Hettiarachchi as Con Priest
- Gunadasa Madurasinghe as Con Priest

== Soundtrack ==
No.	Title	Lyrics	Singer(s)	Length
1.	"Heenen Awidinna"	Nilar N. Kasim	Surendra Perera, Hirushi Jayasena	2:49
2.	"Maya Enawa"	Vimalajith Dombagahawatta	Uditha Sanjaya	2:54
