= Sriyani Amarasena =

Sri Lankan actress and director

Sriyani Amarasena ශ්‍රියානි අමරසේන
- Born: Palamakumbura Herath Mudiyanselage Sriyani Weerakoon Kumarihami; 14 June 1944 (age 82); Meethotamulla, Sri Lanka
- Education: Musaeus College
- Occupations: Actress, Producer, Director
- Years active: 1961–present
- Spouse: Arthur U. Amarasena (m. 1964)
- Children: Inoka Amarasena; Sampath Amarasena
- Awards: Best Actress

Kalasuri Palamakumbura Herath Mudiyanselage Sriyani Weerakoon Kumarihami (born 14 June 1944), popularly known as Sriyani Amarasena, is an actress in Sri Lankan cinema, television and theater as well as a producer and director. Sriyani has appeared in several critically acclaimed Lester James Peries movies, including Golu Hadawatha, Desa Nisa and Ahasin Polawata.

== Personal life ==
She was born on 14 June 1944 in Meethotamulla, Kolonnawa, Sri Lanka. Her father worked at Colombo Municipal Council. She had her education from three schools, primary education from Meetotamulla College, and then from Musaeus College and Gothami Balika Vidyalaya, Colombo.

She is married to former journalist Arthur U. Amarasena. The couple has one daughter, Inoka Amarasena and one son, Sampath Amarasena. Inoka also acted in few films such as Kristhu Charithaya and Gehenu Lamai.

== Acting career ==
During school time, she acted few dramas like Hathara Beeri Kathawa and Koheda Yanne Rukmani. Then, she met Siri Perera and entered to Lama Mandapaya program in the SLBC. Amarasena first appeared on stage drama with P. D.L Perera's Thammanna, and then gain popularity with the role daughter of Dayananda Gunawardena's stage drama Naribana. Some of her other stage dramas include Hitha Honda Ammandi and Ves Muhunu.

Her maiden cinematic appearance came through a feature film Wings Over Ceylon directed by Pagngnasoma Hettiarachchi. Then she acted in a minifilm Keti Kathawa directed by D.B. Nihalsinghe. This film is recorded as the first cinemascope film produced in Sri Lanka.

After the marriage, Amarasena entered mainstream cinema, where her maiden acting came through in the blockbuster film Golu Hadawatha in 1968. This in turn opened door to enter popular cinema industry. Some of her notable dramatic roles came through the film such as Desa Nisa, Ahasin Polawata, Viragaya and Mahagedara. Apart from dramatic roles, Amarasena also acted many commercial films of many genre, such as Kalyani Ganga and Raththaran Amma, which earned her positive critical responses. In 1993, she was awarded the Sarasaviya award for the film Kulageya.

Her maiden teledrama production came through Dath Kekulu Pala. Then she produced three television serials, Ira Bata Taruwa, Hemanthaye Wasanthayak and Hangi Muttham where they made partly in London for England-based Sri Lankan audiences. In 2003, she directed and produced the tele series Peraliya, which was shot in Australia. In 2005, she directed the serial Thusharaye Chaya which was shot in USA. In 2011, she directed the serial Mayura Asapuwa.

In 2019, he was honored with Janabhimani Honorary Award at the Bandaranaike Memorial International Conference Hall. In 2021, he was honored with the 'Deshabhimani Keerthi Kalabushana' award.

=== Selected television serials ===
- Ayomi
- Dath Kekulu Pala
- Gini Weluma
- Girikula (Cameo appearance)
- Mayura Asapuwa
- Natath Ayek Sura Mathin
- Rangira
- Ran Samanalayo
- Swayanjatha
- Udu Sulanga

== Filmography ==
Key
†	Denotes films that have not yet been released

=== As actress ===
Year	Film	Role	Ref.			
1968	Golu Hadawatha	Champa				
1970	Penawa Neda					
1970	Priyanga					
1971	Hathara Denama Surayo	Somey				
1971	Seeye Nottuwa					
1973	Aparadaya Ha Danduwama					
1974	Kalyani Ganga	Kalyani				
1974	Sagarika					
1974	Sihasuna					
1975	Obai Mamai	Nanda				
1975	Tharanga	Anoma				
1975	Raththaran Amma	Kalyani				
1975	Lassana Dawasak	Priyanthi				
1975	Desa Nisa	Sundari				
1976	Ran Thilaka					
1976	Mangalaa					
1977	Hithuwoth Hithuwamai	Sumali				
1977	Yali Ipade					
1977	Sikuru Dasawa					
1977	Niwena Ginna	Nanda				
1978	Asha Dasin					
1978	Hitha Mithura	Juliet				
1978	Selinage Walawwa	Violet				
1978	Kumara Kumariyo	Achala Weerawardena				
1978	Sandawata Rantharu					
1978	Ahasin Polawata	Vineetha		1970	Priyanga	
1979	Sarungale	Soma, Simon's wife				
1979	Raja Kollo	Sriyani / Chandrawathi				
1979	Eka Hitha	Achala				
1979	Rosa Mal Thunak	Anusha				
1979	Akke Mata Awasaa	Anuja				
1980	Mal Kekulu	Palika				
1980	Kanchana	Shanthi				
1980	Parithyagaya	Anula				
1980	Bambara Pahasa	Seetha				
1980	Muwan Palessa 2	Mali				
1980	Mage Amma					
1981	Senasuma					
1981	Sooriyakantha	Mayuri				
1981	Ridee Thella					
1981	Ranga	Ranga's mother				
1981	Sathara Pera Nimithi	Sudath's mother				
1982	Hello Shyama					
1982	Maha Gedara	Anula Malwanna				
1982	Pethi Gomara	Sudhira				
1982	Jeewithayen Jeewithayak					
1982	Rahasak Nathi Rahasak					
1982	Situ Diyaniya	Somawathie 'Soma' Madiwaka				
1982	Paaramitha	Chamari				
1982	Yahalu Yeheli	Iskola Hamine				
1983	Ran Mini Muthu					
1983	Chandira	Seethamma				
1983	Niliyakata Pem Kalemi	Chintamani				
1983	Subodha					
1983	Menik Maliga					
1983	Sister Mary	Sumali				
1984	Binari Saha Sudubanda	Binari				
1984	Rana Derana	Namali				
1985	Wathsala Akka					
1985	Obata Diwura Kiyannam	Shanthi				
1985	Doo Daruwo					
1986	Yali Hamuwennai	Priyanthi Abeysinghe				
1986	Prarthana	Loku Hamine				
1987	Raja Wadakarayo	Nandani				
1987	Viragaya	Sarojini				
1987	Dhonkara					
1987	Ahinsa	Party guest				
1988	Amme Oba Nisa					
1988	Satana					
1988	Angulimala					
1990	Dese Mal Pipila	Sumali				
1990	Madu Sihina					
1991	Bambara Kalapaya					
1991	Golu Muhude Kunatuwa					
1992	Kulageya	Edna Dias				
1993	Saagara Thiina					
1993	Lassanai Balanna					
1994	Sudu Piruwata	Mrs. Rathnayake				
1994	Vijaya Geetha	Shelterer's mother				
1995	Edath Chandiya Adath Chandiya	Karuna				
1996	Obatai Me Aradhana					
1996	Sebe Mithura					
1997	Duwata Mawaka Misa					
1997	Tharanaya					
1997	Vijayagrahanaya					
2000	Chakrayudha					
2000	Indrakeelaya					
2003	Le Kiri Kandulu	Nethalie		2005	One Shot	Vijaya's aunt
2005	Sulanga	Judge				
2006	Double Game					
2008	Adara Meena					
2013	Bomba Saha Rosa					
2017	Seema Na Akase	Isuru's mother				
2024	Weerya	Padma Jayawardena				
