= Upeksha Swarnamali =

Sri Lankan actress, singer, dancer and politician

Hon. Upeksha Swarnamali MP

Member of Parliament for Gampaha Electoral District
- In office 22 April 2010 – 26 June 2015
- Majority: 81,350 Preferential Votes

Personal details
- Born: June 26, 1984 (age 42) Kuwait
- Party: United National Party (2010-2013); Sri Lanka Freedom Party (2013-2015)
- Other political affiliations: United National Front; (2010-2013) United People's Freedom Alliance (2013-2015)
- Spouse(s): Mahesh Chaminda Walawegamage (divorced) Samantha Perera (m. 2016; div. 2021)
- Children: 1
- Parent: Nirmalee de Silva Swarnamali
- Education: Indian central School
- Occupation: Actress

Upeksha Swarnamali (Sinhala: උපේක්ෂා ස්වර්ණමාලි), popularly known as "Paba", is an actress in Sri Lankan cinema and television and a former member of the Sri Lanka Parliament. She gained popularity for her role on the television series "Paba" broadcast on Independent Television Network.

== Personal life ==
She was born to Sri Lankan parents in Kuwait, where she lived for 20 years before returning to Sri Lanka in 2004. She studied at Indian International School in Kuwait and holds a Diploma in Dancing. Her mother is Nirmalee Swarnamali and her father is a Tamil citizen. She's stated that she never knew about her father due to her parents' divorce when she was 4 years old. Swarnamali has a brother from another mother named J. Shehan Fernando.

Swarnamali was first married to Mahesh Chaminda, but she was assaulted by him and was hospitalised with heavy bruises and other injuries. They divorced on 31 January 2013, by a court order from Colombo District Court. She then married to a car sales dealer, Samantha Perera on March 13, 2016. The couple has one daughter. However, the couple divorced in 2021.

== Acting ==
Starting her career as a model, she appeared on several song videos including "Chanchala", and took a major role in the television drama series Paba. She also participated in the reality dancing show Sirasa Dancing Stars, but was eliminated on 8 June 2008. She won the Sumathi Award for Best Upcoming Actress for Most popular actress sponsored by Vendol. In 2008, she acted in Sri Lanka's first digital movie, Hetawath Mata Adaraya Karanna. During the shooting of the teledrama Ahas Maliga, she was bitten by a cobra.

=== Selected television serials ===
- Aganthukaya
- Ahas Maliga
- Bindunu Sith
- Dekada Kada
- Divyadari
- Oba Nisa
- Paba
- Samanalunta Wedithiyanna
- Thathparayak Denna
- Yakada Pahan Thira

== Politics ==
She gained national attention due to the controversial removal from the Paba teledrama aired by State run ITN, due to what she claimed as her open support for then opposition presidential candidate (General Sarath Fonseka).

She was elected as a member of the Sri Lanka Parliament in the 2010 General Elections held on 8 April 2010 representing the United National Party having obtained 81350 preferential votes being the second from Gampaha District UNP list. In June 2010, she steered controversy over an interview she gave on Derana TV. The interview caused great embarrassment to herself as well as the Sri Lankan public. Later she admitted that she lacked political knowledge and had no knowledge about Sri Lankan constitution.

She supported the governing United People's Freedom Alliance voting for the 18th amendment to the constitution and crossing over. After that she joined Sri Lanka Freedom Party. Swarnamali retired from active politics in 2015.

== Appearance in reality show Mega Star ==
She took part as a contestant in the Mega Star reality program organized by Swarnavahini, a leading TV broadcast station of Sri Lanka. She made it to the four finalists and was voted the 4th in the Mega Star finals.

== Monitoring Minister ==
MP Upeksha Swarnamali was appointed Monitoring Minister of Foreign Employment Promotion and Welfare by President Mahinda Rajapaksa from 2014.

== Filmography ==
She acted more teledramas than films since her beginning and popularity through teledramas. Her notable film career began with her latest film Cindrella.

Key
| † | Denotes films that have not yet been released |

| Year | Film | Role | Ref. |
|---|---|---|---|
| 2007 | Asai Man Piyabanna | Ranmalee's sister | |
| 2009 | Akasa Kusum | Film actress | |
| 2010 | Tikiri Suwanda | Nilmini | |
| 2010 | Uththara | | |
| 2011 | Suseema | | |
| 2012 | Bomba Saha Rosa | Shani | |
| 2016 | Cindrella | Isanka | |
| 2016 | Maya 3D | Nirmala | |
| 2019 | Maanaya | | |
| 2022 | Rashmi | Rashmi | |
| 2024 | Ridee Seenu | Mother | |
| TBA | Sithija Seya † | | |

== Discography ==
=== Non-album singles ===
- Lan Lan Wee (2014)
