= Soosthi =

2020 Sri Lankan drama film

- Sinhala: සූස්ති
- Directed by: Kushan Weerarathne
- Written by: Kalana Gunasekara
- Produced by: Guththila Strategic Solutions
- Starring: Kalana Gunasekara; Samanalee Fonseka; W. Jayasiri; Maureen Charuni
- Cinematography: Chinthaka Somakeerthi
- Edited by: Chimantha Mahanama
- Music by: Asha Rajapaksha
- Distributed by: CEL Theaters
- Release date: 17 July 2020
- Country: Sri Lanka
- Language: Sinhala

Soosthi (Sinhala: සූස්ති) is a 2020 Sri Lankan Sinhala drama road movie directed by Kushan Weerarathne and produced by Udara Palliyaguruge for Guththila Strategic Solutions. It stars Kalana Gunasekara and Samanalee Fonseka in lead roles along with W. Jayasiri, Maureen Charuni and Disni Rajapaksa in supportive roles. Music composed by Asha Rajapaksha. This is the debut film by Kushan Weerarathne.

The film received mixed reviews from critics.

== Cast ==
- Kalana Gunasekara as Malaka
- Samanalee Fonseka as Soosa
- W. Jayasiri as Soosa's father
- Maureen Charuni as Soosa's mother
- Disni Rajapaksa
