= Sama Kumaru Kathawa =

- Sinhala: සාම කුමරු කතාව
- Directed by: Nishantha Seneviratne
- Based on: Buddhist stories
- Produced by: Guththila Films
- Starring: Wimal Kumara de Costa; Rohana Beddage; Geetha Kanthi Jayakody
- Distributed by: CEL Theaters
- Release date: 31 May 2019
- Country: Sri Lanka
- Language: Sinhala

Sama Kumaru Kathawa (Tale of the Prince of Peace) (Sinhala: සාම කුමරු කතාව) is a 2019 Sri Lankan Sinhala Buddhist epic biographical film directed by Nishantha Seneviratne and produced by Udara Palliyaguru for Guththila Strategic Solutions (Pvt) Ltd. It film stars Wimal Kumara de Costa, Rohana Beddage, Geetha Kanthi Jayakody and many new child cast. It is the 1332nd Sri Lankan film in the Sinhala cinema.

The film was released on 31 May 2019 to fill the film gap.

== Plot ==
The film is based on the Buddhist epic novel called Pansiya Panas Jathaka Potha, which contain nearly 550 Jataka tales about the pre-incarnations of Gautama Buddha.

== Cast ==
- Wimal Kumara de Costa
- Geetha Kanthi Jayakody
- Rohana Beddage
- Nalaka Daluwatte
- Himaya Bandara
- Dineth de Silva
- Nanda Wickramage
- Deshapriya Bandara
- Rahal Bulathsinhala
- Ashoka Priyadarshana
- Shan Fernando

=== Child cast ===
- Dimirthi Palliyaguru
- Deertha Palliyaguru
- Akash Vihanga as Sama Prince
- Rizon Lehansa
