= Pani Makuluwo =

- teaser poster
- Directed by: Isuru Weerasinghe Mudali
- Written by: Isuru Weerasinghe Mudali
- Based on: True Story
- Produced by: Cloud Films
- Starring: Sanath Gunathilake; Aishara Athukorala; Dineth de Silva; Priota Farelin
- Cinematography: Gayan Shanaka Muhandiram
- Edited by: Vinon Sutharashan; Amitha Dilshan
- Music by: Seneth Dayantha
- Distributed by: MPI Theatres
- Release date: 4 May 2017
- Country: Sri Lanka
- Language: Sinhala

Pani Makuluwo is a 2017 Sri Lankan Sinhala cyber crime thriller film directed by Isuru Weerasinghe Mudali and produced by U.A. Palliyaguru for Cloud Films. It stars Sanath Gunathilake and Aishara Athukorala in lead roles along with Dineth de Silva and Bangladeshi actress Priota Farelin. Music composed by Nadeeka Guruge. Music composed by Seneth Dayantha. It is the 1275th Sri Lankan film in the Sinhala cinema.

== Cast ==
- Sanath Gunathilake as Ranaweera
- Aishara Athukorala as Nilu
- Dineth de Silva as Cyber boyfriend
- Priota Farelin as Shashi
- Duminda Harshana as Spy
- Thilini Jayamali as Servant
- Chalith Manuranga as CID agent
- Raseli Chandrajithya as CID agent
- Poornima Vidushika as Cyber love interest

== Song ==
No.	Title	Singer(s)	Length
1.	"Awakashaye"	Amarasiri Pieris
