= Devi Kusumasana =

- official poster
- Sinhala: දේවි කුසුමාසන
- Directed by: Jayantha Chandrasiri
- Written by: Jayantha Chandrasiri
- Based on: Historical records
- Produced by: Subaskaran Allirajah; Janaki Wijerathna
- Starring: Udari Warnakulasooriya; Hemal Ranasinghe; Mahendra Perera; Kusum Renu; Sriyantha Mendis
- Cinematography: Ruwan Costa
- Edited by: Ravindra Guruge
- Music by: Dinesh Subasinghe
- Production company: Lyca Productions
- Distributed by: EAP Films
- Release date: 22 May 2025
- Running time: 141 minutes
- Country: Sri Lanka
- Language: Sinhala
- Budget: LKR 1500 lakhs (estd.)

Devi Kusumasana (Sinhala: දේවි කුසුමාසන), is a 2025 Sri Lankan Sinhalese historical film directed by Jayantha Chandrasiri and co-produced by Janaki Wijerathna and Subaskaran Allirajah for Lyca Productions. The film based on the life of Kusumasana Devi and her affair with Konappu Bandara who later ascend the throne in 'om as Vimaladharmasuriya I during Portuguese Ceylon. It stars Udari Warnakulasooriya in the titular role with Hemal Ranasinghe in lead roles where Mahendra Perera, Kusum Renu, Sriyantha Mendis and Megha Sooriyarachchi made supportive roles. Hemal and Udari share the screen for the third time after Adaraneeya Kathawak (2016) and Ksheera Sagaraya Kalabina (2023). Dinesh Subasinghe has composed the songs and the Back ground score.

The film mostly received positive reviews.

== Cast ==
- Udari Warnakulasooriya as Kusumasana Devi
- Hemal Ranasinghe as Konappu Bandara
- Mahendra Perera as Arittaki Vendu Perumal
- Kusum Renu as Karalliyadde Bandara's wife
- Megha Sooriyarachchi as Andri Rodriguez
- Sriyantha Mendis as Wickramasinghe, The chief minister of Rajasinha I
- Sanath Gunathilake
- Dineth De Silva as Yamasinghe Bandara
- Uditha Gunaratna
- Buddhika Jayaratne as Weerasundara Bandara
- Chilli Thilanka as a Portuguese captain
- Ryan VanRoyen as Pero Lopes De Souza
- Anura Dharmasiriwardena as Seethawaka Rajasinghe
- Wasantha Kumaravila as Ekanayaka
- Wasantha Wittachchi as Karalliyadde Bandara
- Dimuthu Chinthaka as Buddhist monk
- Disney Rajapaksa
- Lakshman Rajapaksa
- Srimal Wedisinghe as Judge
- Chanchala Warnasuriya
- Lakshmi Damayanthi as Katrina De Abrew
- Sahan Hewadeva
- Malinda Perera as Barbosa Aponsu
- Chamal Ranasinghe
- Milinda Madugalle
- Sanjaya Bandaranaike
- Chami Senanayake as Sargeant Alberkirk
- Dumi Wanniarachchi as Padma
- Sanduni Hettigoda as Athapaththu Sebaliya
- Divya Sharika as Emanuela
- Jayanath Senanayaka as Veera
- Sudath Anthony
- Ruwan Wikramasinghe
- Sakura Aththanayaka as Nalangana

== Production and release ==
This is the seventh cinema direction by award-winning director Jayantha Chandrasiri, after Agnidahaya (2002), Guerilla Marketing (2005), Samanala Sandhawaniya (2013), Maharaja Gemunu (2015), Gharasarapa (2018) and Midunu Vishwaya (2023). He also wrote the screenplay, song lyrics and information exploration based on early chronicles. The film is produced by Subaskaran Allirajah for Lyca Productions along with Janaki Wijerathna, marking its second venture in Sri Lanka after Rani. Assistant directors are Nimal Francis and Priyantha Sri Samarakoon, cinematographer is Ruwan Costa and editor is Ravindra Guruge. Second assistant directors are Mahesh Uyanwatte, Tharindu Madushan, Vishwa Prabuddha and Buwaneka Kahandawala.

Color mixing and DCP printing handled by Dilan Gunawardena, sound editing by Aruna Priyantha Kaluarachchi and hairstyling by Haroon Shaideen. Choreography done by Gayan Srimal, stunt direction by Wasantha Kumarawila and production design by Dhammika Hewaduwatte. Special visual effects co-handled by Buddika Wijeratne and Saminda Vatavana Withanage, Costume designed by Wasana Hewaduwatta, whereas production management handled by Nimal Wijesiri Senadheera.

Production coordination included Akalanka Ratnayake, Namal Bandara, Theekshana Kumara and Buddhini Jayawardena. Screenwriting consulted by Buddhini Jayawardena and dialogues recorded by Pubudu Dhananjaya Wanigasekera. Sharaka Shyamal is the chief electrical engineer. Award-winning musician Dinesh Subasinghe did the music direction and the composing. Amal Perera, Rooney, Sanuli Perera and Erandi Heshani & Indika Udara Lanka made background vocals.

The film was released on 22 May 2025 in EAP theaters. The special media screening was held at the Wattala Ram Cinema Hall.
