= Dimuthu Chinthaka =

Sri Lankan actor

- දිමුතු චින්තක
- Born: Colombo, Sri Lanka
- Other name: Dimuthu Chinthaka Dewapriya
- Education: Anuradhapura Central College
- Occupations: Actor; schoolteacher
- Years active: 1987–present

Dimuthu Chinthaka (දිමුතු චින්තක) is a Sri Lankan actor who has appeared in Sinhala-language films, television dramas and stage productions. His screen credits include Samanala Sandhawaniya (2013), Maharaja Gemunu (2015) and The Newspaper (2020). His television work includes Wamana Yamaya (2017) and Hathe Kalliya (2019).

== Background ==
Chinthaka was born in Colombo and later settled in the Anuradhapura area. He attended Anuradhapura Central College. Alongside acting, he worked as a schoolteacher. In a July 2019 interview, he identified Ashoka Maha Vidyalaya in Perimiyankulama as the school where he taught, and described conducting school drama programmes addressing drug prevention.

== Career ==
=== Theatre ===
Chinthaka has performed in stage productions including Kelani Palama. He was named in the cast of the play's revived production in 2017 and in reports of subsequent performances in 2019 and 2021. He was also a cast member of Romba Thanks, a stage comedy about relations between Sinhala and Tamil communities, which premiered in October 2024.

=== Television ===
Chinthaka appeared in Isuru Bhavana, a Sri Lankan television drama. In 2017, The Sunday Times listed him among the cast of Senaka Edirisinghe's television series Wamana Yamaya, broadcast on Rupavahini. In the 2019 Hiru TV series Hathe Kalliya, he portrayed a member of parliament named Dheerashekara.

=== Film ===
Chinthaka appeared in Jayantha Chandrasiri's Agnidahaya (2002), Samanala Sandhawaniya (2013) and Maharaja Gemunu (2015). His subsequent films include Motor Bicycle (2016) and The Newspaper (2020), the latter directed by Sarath Kothalawala and Kumara Thirimadura.

He appeared in Govi Thaththa, directed by Darshana Ruwan Dissanayake and released in 2025, and portrayed a Buddhist monk in Chandrasiri's Devi Kusumasana (2025).

== Selected filmography ==
=== Films ===
Year	Film	Ref.
2002	Agnidahaya	
2013	Samanala Sandhawaniya	
2015	Maharaja Gemunu	
2016	Motor Bicycle	
2020	The Newspaper	
2025	Govi Thaththa	
2025	Devi Kusumasana	

=== Television ===
Year	Title	Role	Ref.
2009	Isuru Bhavana	Raja Rajasinghe	
2017	Wamana Yamaya		
2019	Hathe Kalliya	Dheerashekara (member of parliament)	

=== Theatre ===
Production	Notes	Ref.
Kelani Palama	Cast member in the revival of the play	
Romba Thanks	Cast member	
