= Ruwan Costa =

Sri Lankan cinematographer (born in 1967)

Ruwan Costa රුවන් කොස්තා
- Born: Chalitha Ruwan Costa; 8 May 1967 (age 59); Mawanella, Sri Lanka
- Education: Kingswood College, Kandy
- Occupations: Cinematographer, TV Commercial Director, Documentary Filmmaker, Company Director
- Years active: 1984–present
- Spouse: Dhammika Kumari Warshakoon (m. 1992)
- Children: 3
- Awards: Best Cinematographer
- Website: https://www.ruwancosta.com

Chalitha Ruwan Costa (born 8 May 1967 as රුවන් කොස්තා) is a Sri Lankan cinematographer and cameraman known for his works in Sinhala-language cinema. Often considered as one of the leading cinematographers in Sinhala cinema, his best known works include: Agnidahaya (2002), Guerilla Marketing (2005), Sankranthi (2007), Sikuru Hathe (2007), Samige Kathawa (2014), and Adaraneeya Kathawak (2017). In a career spanning more than three decades, Costa worked as the director of photography for 26 films and about 5000 AUP television productions, 3000 AUP television and film commercials.

== Personal life ==
He was born on 8 May 1967 in Mawanella, Kegalle, Sri Lanka as the youngest of the family with one sibling, one sister. His father Ronal Costa is a fire & safety consultant and his mother Heenmanike Wijeratne is a housewife. He completed education from Kingswood College, Kandy.

He is married to Dhammika Kumari Warshakoon where the wedding was celebrated in 1992 after seven years of affair. The couple has three sons.

== Career ==
While studying at Kingswood College, Costa joined the photography society of the school. During this time, he accompanied with his sister for her photography course under the guidance of parents. After completing Advanced level examination, he started to work with still camera to cover many photographic events such as parties and weddings. A group of friends made a new production of Ediriweera Sarachchandra's play Kapuwa Kapothi where Costa played the role of "Manis Mudalali" in it. Then he did a course called Film and Television at the Sathyodaya Foundation in Kandy. In the meantime, Costa joined the Diploma in Cinema conducted Sri Lankan branch of International Catholic Communication Organization for Cinema called "OCIC" organized by the late Rev. Fr. Ernest Poruthota. During the diploma, he got the opportunity to study cinematography from renowned cinematographer Andrew Jayamanna and also worked in local television channels and studios. Then he joined as the assistant cameraman for the television serial Samuganime Nawathena directed by Kapila Kumara Kalinga.

After that OCIC course, he moved to film direction where he made the short film Awarjana in 1985. The short received critics acclaim and later won both OCIC and UNDA awards for best short film. The short is the only one act which won the award for the best apprentice creation for that year through which he gained The Fellowship of OCIC. At that time, Costa directed another short film for OCIC called Netha Viramayak. In 1986, Costa won the OCIC Award for best Camera Director and Lighting for the television serial Nonagathayaka Nimawa. During this period in 1986, he met the filmmaker Bennett Rathnayake where he worked as the second assistant director in his film Sayuren Eha. After establishing the film production house called Benn Films, Costa joined as the camera director. In 1991, he received the 'Abinandana' Award of UNDA. He won the OCIC Award for best Camera Director for the year 1996-1998 for the TV serial Nonagathayaka Nimawa. During the same time, he won the OCIC Award for best Camera Director and Lighting for the television serial Arundathi.

Later he worked as one of the four cameramen in the film Dhawala Rathriya directed by Sudath Mahaadivulwewa in 1989. Later in 1999, Costa met the renowned director Jayantha Chandrasiri and worked as the cameraman of his teledrama Rejina in 2000. For that serial, he won the Signis (OCIC) Award for best Camera Direction as well. Since then, he worked in almost all cinematic directions of Chandrasiri. In the year 2000, he was awarded the Abinandana Award for best Camera Direction at Sumathi Awards for the serial Wanaspathi. In the next year, Costa won the same award for the television serial Yugavilakkuwa. Costa won the 2002 Award for best Cinematographer in 2002 at the Sarasaviya Awards for his work in the critics acclaimed film Agnidahaya. For the same film, he later won the Award for best Cinematographer at the Signis (OCIC) film festival. In 2002, Costa made his maiden cinematography with Chandrasiri's film Agnidahaya. The film made his mark in cinema, where he won the Sarasaviya award and UNDA award for the best Cinematographer. In 2004 he worked in the mystery teleplay Dhawala Kanya directed by Anuruddha Jayasinghe. In that year, he won the award for the best Camera Direction at three award ceremonies: the State Television Festival, the Signis (OCIC) festival and Raigam Tele'es. Later in 2005, Costa won the Signis (OCIC) Award for best Camera Direction and Lighting Direction and award for the Best Camera and Lighting Director for the same teleplay at the State Television Festival.

Then in the same year, he handled the camera for the serial Jeevithayata Ida Denna and won the award for the best Camera Direction at the State Television Festival. In that year, Costa collaborated with another two prominent cinematographers: Channa Deshapriya Wickramatantri & N.A Palitha Perera to establish a cinematography company titled "Magic Lantern". In 2007, he received the Award for the best Documentary Camera Director at the State Television Festival. After many works in television, Costa again moved to cinema and worked as the cinematographer for the drama film Sankranthi directed by Anuruddha Jayasinghe. The film received positive reviews from critics where the film was screened at the 34th International Indian Film Festival in December 2006. Later in 2008, he won the Signis (OCIC) Award best Cinematographer.

Costa joined with Chandrasiri back with the television serial Sathara Denek Senpathiyo which was telecast on Jathika Rupavahini. The serial received numerous awards at many drama festivals whereas Costa won the award for the best Camera Director at the State Television Festival. In 2012, he worked with the musical feature film Samanala Sandhawaniya directed by Chandrasiri. Costa won the Signis (OCIC) best Cinematographer for the film in that year. After that, he joined with Priyankara Vittanachchi to handle the camera for the film Samige Kathawa. The film had many positive reviews from local and international critics and won both local and international awards including Signis (OCIC) best Cinematographer which was won the by Costa.

In 2015 he collaborated with Chandrasiri for another film, Maharaja Gemunu where Costa won the award for the best Cinematographer at the Sarasaviya Film Awards. In the next year, he won a Merit Award for camera direction of the film Adaraniya Kathawak at the 19th Presidential Film Festival. In 2018, he worked in the film Kandak Sema with the Japanese crew and international cinematography standards. The film is yet to release in Sri Lanka. In 2020 at the NICE International Film Festival, Costa won the award for the Best Cinematography in a Foreign Language Film for the film Dada Ima.

Apart from cinema and television, Costa also worked extensively in many popular commercials. He also worked as the cinematographer of the short film Frozen Heart directed by Tharindu Lokuarachchi.

=== Teledramas ===
- Avarjanaa
- Abi Samaya
- Ayamawaru
- Dadaman Soya
- Dahas Gavu Dura
- Dandelu Gini
- Dhawala Kanya
- Dhawala Rathriya
- Gamen Awith
- Grahanaya
- Hatharadenek Senpathiyo
- Jeevithayata Ida Denna
- Linda Mariya Magdelena
- Manu Kakapura
- Meeduma
- Nethra Mangallaya
- Nisalavila
- Nonagatheka Nimawak
- Rejina
- Saddhi Viharaya
- Sangili Palama
- Sathweni Rala
- Wanas Pathi
- Yasodaranamwu Aye
- Yuga Vilakkuwa

== Filmography ==
Year	Film	Ref.
2002	Agnidahaya	
2004	Rajjumala	
2005	Dhawala Duvili	
2005	Guerilla Marketing	
2005	Sudu Kalu Saha Alu	
2006	Nilambare	
2007	Sankranthi	
2007	Aganthukaya	
2007	Sikuru Hathe	
2011	King Hunther	
2012	Super Six	
2013	Samanala Sandhawaniya	
2013	Peeter One	
2014	Samige Kathawa	
2014	Ko Mark No Mark	
2015	Maharaja Gemunu	
2016	Adaraneeya Kathawak	
2017	Heena Hoyana Samanallu	
2017	A Level	
2018	Nela	
2022	Ashawari	
2023	Kandak Sema	
2023	Kathuru Mithuru	
2023	Dada Ima	
2024	My Red Comrade	
2024	Mandaraa	
2025	Devi Kusumasana	
TBA	Sihina Abhisheka †	
TBA	Sihina Lowen †	
TBA	Sooriya Sulaga †	
TBA	Mala Magulai †	
