= Buddhika Jayaratne =

Sri Lankan actor and filmmaker

Buddhika Jayaratne බුද්ධික ජයරත්න
- Born: 1 August 1974 (age 52); Ragama, Sri Lanka
- Education: Ananda College, Colombo, Srilanka
- Occupations: Actor and director
- Years active: 2001 - present
- Notable work: Sunny’s Mansion, Arugam Bay, Midunu Vishwaya, Chandoli, Senasuru Maruwa, Sathara Denek Senpathiyo

Buddhika Jayaratne (born August 1, 1974) is a Sri Lankan actor and director. He has worked in film and television since 2001. Jayaratne has appeared in leading roles in Israeli film Arugam Bay (2023) and Australian film Sunny's Mansion (2024).

== Early life and education ==
He attended Asoka Vidyalaya in Colombo for his primary education and Ananda College, Colombo, for his secondary education. Before entering the film industry, he worked in aviation and as a freelance fashion designer, organizing several fashion shows.

== Career ==
=== Early career (2001–2005) ===
Jayaratne originally joined the set of Rosa Wasanthe as a costume designer. He ended up in front of the camera as well, taking a supporting role in the film his acting debut, in December 2001, under director Udayakantha Warnasuriya. The film did well commercially, and further collaborations with Warnasuriya followed, among them Le Kiri Kandulu and Senasuru Maruwa.

=== Establishment in cinema (2006–2008) ===
He had already moved into television by 2002, appearing in Depath Nai under director Eranga Senarathna. It was his role in Sanjaya Nirmal's Samara (2006), however, that stood out early in his career particularly for how he approached anti-hero characters, a type not widely explored in Sinhala cinema at the time.

Jayaratne with Chandran Ratnam in 2023

Two years later, Hatharadenama Soorayo put him in a difficult position: the 2008 remake required stepping into a role originally played by Gamini Fonseka. Rather than echo Fonseka's performance, Jayaratne built his own interpretation of the character, a choice he has since pointed to as important for the longevity of his career.

Working with director Jayantha Chandrasiri on the television drama Sathara Denek Senpathiyo (2009) brought him a Sumathi Merit Award and a SIGNIS International Special Jury award. Jayaratne has spoken of this period as something close to formal training a stretch where he learned to shape performances around emotional resonance rather than instinct alone.

=== Critical recognition (2013–2022) ===
His work in 2013: Senasuru Maruwa brought him the Best Actor award (Negative Role) at the 2024 Derana Film Awards.

A second Sumathi Merit Award followed in 2014, this time for Amuthu Minissu. Then, in 2022, his performance in Chandrasiri's Midunu Vishwaya earned him a nomination for Best Supporting Actor at the 2024 Derana Film Awards.

=== International cinema (2023–present) ===
In 2023, Jayaratne took on two international roles. He appeared in Arugam Bay, an Israeli film directed by Marco Carmel and produced by United Channel Movies. The production was filmed in Sri Lanka and also featured Ashan Dias. Arugam Bay went on to a theatrical release in Israel and across Europe in 2024.

That same year, he starred in Sunny's Mansion, an Australian production directed by Sri Lankan-born filmmaker Herman Perera and produced by Zayan Productions. Filmed in Australia, it was the only production on which Jayaratne served as the sole Sri Lankan cast or crew member. The film was scheduled for theatrical release in Australia in 2025, with distribution through Amazon Prime.

=== Directing and screenwriting ===
Jayaratne's directorial debut came with Dedunu Wessa (2006), a romantic film he also wrote and co-produced alongside Colombo Pictures, Piyal Seneviratne, and Ranjith Jayasooriya.

He returned to screenwriting a decade later with Puthandiya (2016), distributed by EAP Films. His upcoming directional projects include September and Colombo 13.

== Business ventures ==
Jayaratne founded Artha by Buddhika Jayaratne in 2019, a furniture business specializing in upcycled and reclaimed wood designs. The venture has been described as supporting tradespeople affected by the COVID-19 pandemic.

== Filmography ==
=== Film ===
| YEAR | FILM | ROLE | Notes |
|---|---|---|---|
| 2001 | Rosa Wasanthe | Gihan | Acting debut, also costume designer |
| 2004 | Randiya Dahara | Captain Cyril | |
| 2006 | Dedunu Wessa | Rohith | Director, writer, co-producer, and costume designer |
| 2006 | Samaara | Shane | |
| 2006 | Eka Malaka Pethi | Kuma | Also costume designer |
| 2008 | Hathara Denama Surayo | Podde Ayya | |
| 2009 | Sinasuna Adaren | Thiwanka | |
| 2012 | Senasuru Maruwa | Viraj | Derana Film Award for Best Actor (Negative) |
| 2013 | Butterfly Symphony(Samanala Sandhwaniya) | Guest appearance | Cameo appearance |
| 2013 | Raja Horu | OIC Kapila | |
| 2016 | Puthandiya | Vimukthi | Also, writer |
| 2019 | Vijayaba Kollaya | | |
| 2019 | Ginnen Upan Seethala | | |
| 2019 | Katha Karana Heena | | |
| 2021 | Kawuruth Danne Na | Roy | |
| 2022 | The Game (2022 film) | | |
| 2023 | Midunu Vishwaya | | |
| 2024 | Arugam Bay | OIC | Israeli production |
| 2024 | Sri Siddha | | Sarasavi Film Festival for Best Actor (Negative) - Nomonation |
| 2024 | Seeruwen | | |
| 2025 | Sunny's Mansion | Dhar | Australian production |
| TBA | Samaharu Saha Samagama † | | |
| TBA | Kidnap (2023 film) † | | |
| TBA | Colombo 13 † | | |
| TBA | Aragalayak Meda † | | |

=== Selected television serials ===
- Ahimi
- Amuthu Minissu
- Dadakeli Arana
- Deweni Inima
- Iti Mal
- Koombiyo
- Sathara Denek Senpathiyo
- Sala Muthu Pema
- Tharu Ahasata Adarei

== Awards ==
| Year | Award | Category | Work | Result | Ref. |
|---|---|---|---|---|---|
| 2009 | State Tele Awards | Special Jury Award | Sathara Denek Senpathiyo | Won | |
| 2009 | SIGNIS International Tele Awards | Special Jury Award | Sathara Denek Senpathiyo | Won | |
| 2013 | Derana Film Awards | Best Actor (Negative) | Senasuru Maruwa | Won | |
| 2014 | Sumathi Awards | Merit Award | Amuthu Minissu | Won | |
| 2024 | Derana Film Awards | Best Supporting Actor | Midunu Vishwaya | Nominated | |
| 2024 | Sarasavi Film Festival | Best Actor (Negative) | Sri Siddha | Nominated | |
