= H. M. Jayawardena =

Sri Lankan composer and musician (1950–2020)

H. M. Jayawardena එච්. එම්. ජයවර්ධන
- Born: Herath Mudiyanselage Jayawardena; 17 March 1950; Monaragala, Siyambalanduwa, Sri Lanka
- Died: 18 April 2019 (aged 69); Colombo, Sri Lanka
- Resting place: Kanatte Cemetery
- Education: Siyambalanduwa national school and Passara Maha Vidyalaya
- Occupations: Composer, musician
- Spouse: Malani Bulathsinhala (m. 1978)
- Children: Kasun Kalhara, Nirmani Chaya
- Musical career
- Genres: Pop; soul; rhythm and blues; Indian classical music
- Instruments: Vocals, flute
- Years active: 1959–2015
- Labels: HMV; Torana

Herath Mudiyanselage Jayawardena (17 March 1950 – 18 April 2019: Sinhala: එච්. එම්. ජයවර්ධන), popularly known as H. M. Jayawardena, was a Sri Lankan flutist, musician and composer. One of the most respected musicians in Sri Lanka, Jayawardena started his musical career as a flutist and later became a popular music director and composer.

== Personal life ==
Jayawardena was born on 17 March 1950 (Note: according to his birth certificate he was born on 10 March 1950; but according to Jayawardena, his father had told him that he was actually born on 17 March 1950 and "March 10" was due to a registration error) in the village Siyambalanduwa, Monaragala, Sri Lanka as the eldest of the family. His father H. M. Wijayasundara was a farmer and his mother D.M. Ranmenika was a housewife. He received his primary education at Siyambalanduwa School. After passing the grade 5 scholarship examination, he entered Passara Maha Vidyalaya for secondary education.

He was married to fellow musician and songstress Malani Bulathsinhala and the wedding was celebrated on 30 December 1978, and was the father of popular musician Kasun Kalhara. His only daughter, Nirmani Chaya died in 1991 at the age of three due to dengue fever. Malani was in the United States to perform a concert when she was found dead in the bathroom at the residence of the Sri Lanka consul Tissa Wijeratne on 29 March 2001 at the age of 51. It is believed that her death was caused by anaphylaxis brought on by an allergic reaction to hair dye.

Jayawardena died on 18 April 2019 at the age of 69, while receiving treatments for prolonged kidney failure at Colombo South Teaching Hospital, Kalubowila. His body was laid at the Jayaratna Respect Reneral Home in Borella and the last rites were performed at the Kanatte Cemetery on Wednesday at 3 pm.

== Career ==
Jayawardena's ambition to be a musician started at an early age where he learned music under P.A. Subasinghe, who became his mentor. After failing his senior exam in Passara, Jayawardena returned to his village and had to live a very difficult life. He farmed chenas and worked for hire. Then he began to play flute which proved to be the turning point in his musical career. In the mid 1960s, Jayawardena applied for a vacancy for a flutist in the Sri Lanka Broadcasting Corporation (SLBC), but failed the test because he could not read the chord charts.

Subsequently, Jayawardena met the Member of Parliament Somapala Seneviratne, who was a close friend and gave Jayawardena the opportunity to stay with him in Shravasthiya instead of returning to Siyambalandu. After recognizing his talent as a flutist, a letter was signed and prepared by 10 MPs which was later handed over to Somadasa Elvitigala, the then head of the music division of the Sri Lanka Broadcasting Corporation. Unfortunately, Elvitigala threw away the letter signed by the MPs and Jayawardena lost his place again. Then he met maestro W.D. Amaradeva and got the opportunity to learn music and chords. The next day he met Vasantha Obeysekera, the teacher who taught him history at Passara Maha Vidyalaya, before coming on the radio and obtaining a letter. This time, Elvitigala received his application.

Jayawardena started his musical career as a freelance flutist at SLBC. He was also the flutist in stage plays such as Devlowa Yanakam and Neth Anda Bisaw which were created at that time. His first musical composition was the song Oba Ha Mema sung by T. M. Jayaratne. After the success of the song, Jayawardena composed the song Siyak Aayu Leba for Jayaratne. In 1981, he made his cinema debut composing the soundtrack to the blockbuster Aradhana along with Rohana Weerasinghe. The music of the film received critical acclaim and later won the 1982 Sarasaviya Award for the Best Music Director for the song Sinawakin Puthuige Muwe. In 1985, Jayawardena won the Presidential Award, but refused it, stating that the award should go the fellow musician Premasiri Khemadasa. He said that the music of Khemadasa's Thunweni Yamaya was better than the music of his film Muhudu Lihini.

As a composer, Jayawardena rendered his knowledge to make several popular hits across many genres and for artists including, Sanda Tharu Nihadai by W.D. Amaradeva, Raththaran Neth Dekin, Me Punchi Rate by Jayaratne, Obayi Ramya Sanda Kirana by Nanda Malini, Eya Yanna Giya Makila, Eka Yayaka Mal by Sanath Nandasiri, Miniseku Pita Nagi, Sayurak Nodu Gangulak, Nube Sithata Punsada by Sunil Edirisinghe, Mala Giraviye by Karunarathna Divulgane, Pancha Kalyaniye by Krishantha Erandaka, Eya Yanna Giya by Amarasiri Peiris, Balikaviyan Thaksala Doren, Kirula Muthu Lihin by Janaka Wickramasinghe and Eka Yaye Kaka Wati by Sunil Edirisinghe and Edward Jayakody, Bana Kiyana Ratak by Jayakody.

Jayawardena also composed some popular songs for his wife Malani, beginning with the solo hit Raja Maduraka Ipadee Sitiyana and continuing with the hits Sanda Ahasa Wage, Himi Sanaramara, Premaye Vil There, Ahasin Tharuwak, Punpoda Sanda, Ma Ekkala Amanapa and Obata Ma Adaraya Kala Bawa. Jayawardena would later be involved in the films Kala Mal, Muhudu Lihini and Mangala Thagga as the composer. Apart from cinema, Jayawardena also worked on the television series: Maheshika and Eka Mawakage Daruwo.

In November 2015, Jayawardena was awarded at Nelum Pokuna in the program Miyasi Theerthaya along with the musician Thissasiri Perera. On 2 February 2018, another felicitation ceremony HM Harasara was held at Maharagama Youth Council.

== Filmography ==
| Year | Film | Roles | Ref. |
|---|---|---|---|
| 1981 | Aradhana | Composer | |
| 1982 | Kala Mal | Composer | |
| 1983 | Muhudu Lihini | Composer | |
| 1983 | Sumithuro | Flutist | |
| 1984 | Mala Giraw | Flutist | |
| 1987 | Mangala Thegga | Composer | |
| 1998 | Vimukthi | Composer | |
| 2003 | Vishma Rathriya | Composer | |
| 2006 | Dharma Puthra | Composer | |
