= Buddhadasa Vithanarachchi =

Sri Lankan actor

Buddhadasa Vithanarachchi බුද්ධදාස විතානාරච්චි
- Born: June 30, 1947 (age 79); Kegalle, Sri Lanka
- Education: St. Mary's College, Kegalle
- Occupation: Actor
- Years active: 1978–present
- Spouse: Sitha Lalani Hemamala
- Children: 3

Buddhadasa Vithanarachchi (born 30 June 1947 as බුද්ධදාස විතානාරච්චි) [Sinhala]) is an actor in Sri Lankan cinema, stage drama and television. He is also a former member of the political party National Freedom Front. He is known for the roles in teledrama Dandubasna Manaya, Akala Sandya and stage drama Mahasupina.

== Personal life ==
He was born on 30 June 1947 in Kegalle, Sri Lanka. He received primary education at the village school and secondary Education at St. Mary's College, Kegalle. Since an early age, he showed ability to speech, perform in school theatre as well as drawing.

He is married to his longtime partner Sitha Lalani Hemamala, postgraduate who did master's degree in nursing from the University of British Columbia, Canada. Sitha began her career as a Staff Nurse and retired as Head of the Department of Nursing at the Open University of Sri Lanka. Later she worked as the Head of Nursing at Katsu International, a private university in Sri Lanka. The couple has two daughters: Priyanwada, Sulochana and a son, Siddhartha. His youngest daughter, Sulochana acted in few stage plays, teledramas and worked as a TV presenter in Sri Lanka. His son worked as a producer for the Rupavahini Corporation. Priyanwada is married to Rukman, Sulochana is married to Udaya and Siddhartha is married to Kanchana.

== Career ==
In the early seventies, he came to Colombo to pursue his drama career. Then he studied drama and theater at the Lionel Wendt Theater where he first entered stage dramas. Vithanarachchi started television acting in 1990s. His most notable television acting came through Jayantha Chandrasiri's epic serials: Dandubasna Manaya and Akala Sandya.

Vithanarachchi started his film career with Veera Puran Appu back in 1978, directed by Lester James Peries with a minor role. His most popular cinema acting came through films Agnidahaya, Sri Siddhartha Gautama and Aloko Udapadi.

Apart from acting, he presented weekend programs on Sri Lanka Rupavahini Corporation for about 15 years.

=== Notable television works ===
- Akala Sandya
- Arungal
- Bharyawo
- Bonda Meedum
- Chandi Kumarihami
- Dambulugala Sakmana
- Dandubasna Manaya
- Ganga Addara
- Gini Avi Saha Gini Keli
- Giri Shikara Meda
- Handapana
- Indikadolla
- Isi Dasuna
- Jayathuru Sankaya
- Karuwala Gedara
- Kunchanadha
- Mahathala Hatana
- Makara Dadayama
- Manokaya
- Maunayagaya
- Nannaththara
- Parasathu Mal
- Ran Damwel
- Rejina
- Sadisi Tharanaya
- Sakuge Kathawa
- Sakuge Lokaya
- Sakviththo
- Sanda Gomman Re
- Sarisara Lihini
- Satharadenek Senpathiyo
- Sihina Wasanthayak
- Sepalika
- Thisara Peraliya
- Verona
- Vimansa
- Wasuli Kanda
- Yaddehi Gedara

== Political career ==
Vithanarachchi joined the Janatha Vimukthi Peramuna (JVP) way back in 1960. In 1981, he contested for the development committee elections from Colombo district uand was able to win under the JVP ticket. However, during the Indo-Sri Lanka Accord in 1987, Vithanarachchi was arrested and detained at the Welikada Prison for one and half years. In 1971, he was a prominent member of the JVP Islandwide singing group. Following the 1987–1989 JVP insurrection, he joined the JVP again and later became a member of the National Freedom Front (NFF) under the leadership of Minister Wimal Weerawansa. However, on 2010, he resigned from the party.

== Radio Play ==
- Tharuwan Saranai
- Nirabhisheka

== Filmography ==
Key
†	Denotes films that have not yet been released

Year	Film	Role	Ref.
1978	Veera Puran Appu	Rebel	
1993	Guru Gedara	Horatio	
1995	Maruthaya		
1996	Anantha Rathriya	Lionel Ranasinghe	
1996	Sihina Deshayen		
1998	Channa Kinnari		
1998	Dorakada Marawa	Coroner	
2002	Agnidahaya	Herath	
2003	Sudu Kaluwara	Maddu Nilame Appuhamy	
2003	Sulang Kirilli	Driver	
2005	Guerilla Marketing		
2006	Samaara	Indu's father	
2012	Vijaya Kuweni	Anurdha Purohita	
2013	Sri Siddhartha Gautama	Guru Vishma Mitra	
2013	Samanala Sandhawaniya	Vadisha's farther	
2014	Ahelepola Kumarihami	Rev. Wariyapola Sri Sumangala Thero	
2014	Parapura	Chethana's father	
2015	Maharaja Gemunu	Monk Mahasiva	
2017	Premaya Nam	Samadhi's father	
2017	Aloko Udapadi	Chief monk Mahatissa	
2017	Seema Na Akase	Apeksha's father	
2018	Nidahase Piya DS	D B Jayathilake	
2021	Kawuruth Danne Na		
TBA	Gunananda Himi Migettuwatte †		
TBA	Thanapathilage Gedara †		
TBA	Shadow †		
