= Pradeepa Dharmadasa =

Sri Lankan songstress and actress

Pradeepa Dharmadasa ප්‍රදීපා ධර්මදාස
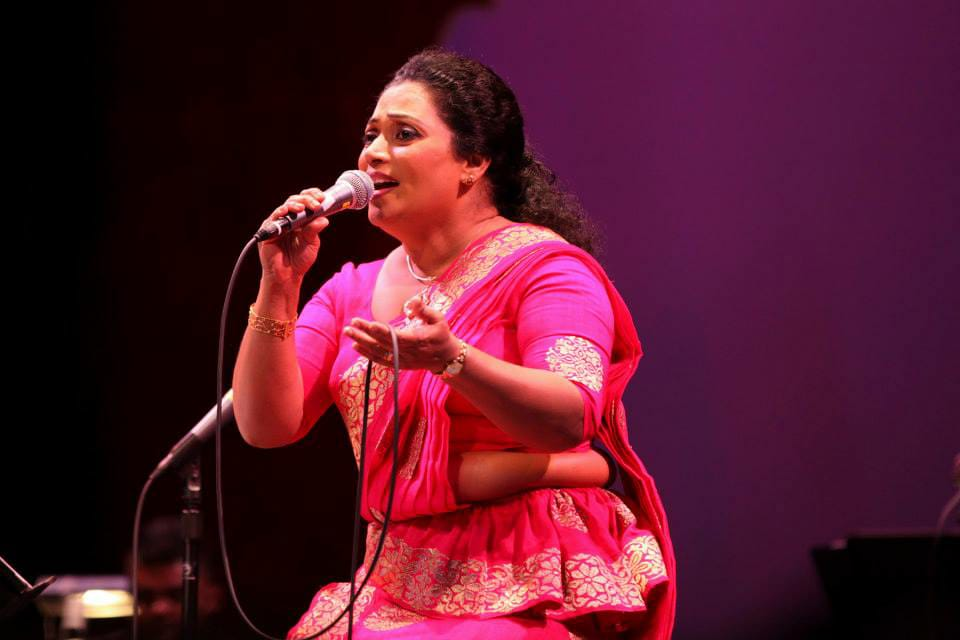
- Born: Pothupitiya Kankanamge Pradeepa Nirmali Hemamali Dharmadasa; 26 January 1964 (age 62); Moratuwa, Sri Lanka
- Education: Princess of Wales' College
- Alma mater: University of Kelaniya; Bhatkhande University; University of Sri Jayewardenepura; Kirkwood Institute of Education
- Occupations: songstress, playback singer, actress
- Spouse: Dullas Alahapperuma (m. 1994)
- Children: 2
- Parents: Pothupitiya K Dharmadasa (father); Hema Medagamage (mother)
- Awards: Best Actress; Best Playback singer
- Musical career
- Genres: Pop; soul; rhythm and blues; Indian classical music
- Instrument: Vocals
- Years active: 1981–present
- Labels: Musings; MEntertainment; Torana; Indhuwara Creations
- Website: https://pradeepadharmadasa.com

Pothupitiya Kankanamge Pradeepa Nirmali Hemamali Dharmadasa (born 26 January 1964 as ප්‍රදීපා ධර්මදාස [Sinhala]), popularly known as Pradeepa Dharmadasa, is a Sri Lankan musician, playback singer and former stage drama actress in Sri Lankan theatre and television.

== Personal life ==
She was born on 26 January 1964 in Rawatawatta, Moratuwa as the second in a family of four children. Her father Pothupitiya Kankanamge Dharmadasa worked at the Agriculture and Govi Jana Seva Department. Her mother Meda Gamage Hema Dharmadasa was a housewife. She has one elder sister and two younger brothers. His closest brother died by drowning in the sea. She studied at Princess of Wales' College, Moratuwa where she met her mentor Somalatha Subasinghe. She studied dancing at Vajira-Chitrasena Academy, and later learned music at `Kala Bhoomi’, Nugegoda. After finishing A/Ls, she followed a drama course at Subasinghe’s 'Sri Lanka Youth Theatre Foundation'.

She completed a master's degree in sociology from the University of Kelaniya. She also holds an Excellence in Music Scholarship from Bhatkhande Music Institute Deemed University, India. After returning, she completed a Diploma in Writing and Mass Communication from the University of Sri Jayewardenepura as well as a Diploma in English from the Kirkwood Institute of Education, USA.

Pradeepa is married to Cabinet Minister Honorable Dullas Daham Kumara Alahapperuma who has been a parliamentarian. The couple has two sons – Mahima Induwara (born in 1995) and Kaushika Nalanda (born in 1996). Mahima started education from Royal College and Kaushika from Ananda College. Later they both went to Lyceum International.

== Career ==
In 1981, she acted in title role of "Sanda Kinduri" produced by Somalatha Subasinghe. In 1983, Subasinghe started a drama school called the Lama Ha Yowun Ranga Peetaya and she joined with it. In 1984 Subasinghe made a new production of the play Mudu Puththu where Pardeepa acted as "Hinnihami" in it. During this period, she acted in many stage plays such as Suba Sarangatha by Athula Peiris and Sakvithi Nikmana by Salaman Fonseka.

In 1980s, Pradeepa started career as a professional actress with the stage play Sathyanganavi produced by Vijitha Gunaratne. In the play, she not only showcased her acting skills but also the singing skills she possessed by playing the role of "Shonte" in Bertolt Brecht's The Good Woman in Setsuan. Therefore, its music director Premasiri Khemadasa invited Pradeepa to join his choir. Later, she made her first song Duwillen Seduna Liye for the television serial Weda Hamine in 1987. In 1988, Kapila Kumara Kalinga created the stage play Nelum Pokuna which included lots of songs. So when he is looking for an actress who can sing songs, he invites Pradeepa. She acted and sang the songs in the play. Later she sang the theme song Rathurosa Malak Pipewi along with Amarasiri Peiris for the single episode teledrama directed by Kalinga.

In the beginning of 1992, she was invited by cassette producer Ranjith Liyanage to make a cassette. She made the cassette "Duwillen Seduna Liye" with 12 songs, where six of them composed by Khemadasa and the other six by Rohana Weerasinghe. In the midst of state media censorship, Pradeepa was able to successfully present the cassette with the support of the "Alternative Media Circle". However, six of those songs of the cassette was banned by Sri Lanka Broadcasting Corporation due to contemporary social issues of various events that were talked about in the country at that time were sung. The song Kolomthotin Naw Nagga spoke about the child trafficking that was prevalent in Sri Lanka at that time. Then the song Balana Avaraga Pipunu Iramala written against the American voice for Iranavila village. The song Madura Oya Pamula speaks about the incidents where farmers drank poison and could not pay their debts. The song Sebe Ugaththu was written about the loss of jobs for university students. But with that ban, the cassette sold well.

However, she continued to act in the stage plays such as lead role in Naga Gurula produced by K. B. Herath. In 1993, she won the award for the Best Actress of the Year for her performance in the play Ukdandu Ginna produced by Nimal Ekanayake at the State Drama Festival. She also played in the plays Muhunu Dekak, Sakvithi Nikmana and as "Sinha Seevali" in critically acclaimed Ediriweera Sarachchandra's Sinhabahu and as "Chamari" in R. R. Samarakoon's Duwili.

However, Pradeepa selected her pathway from singing where she sang several popular songs including; Kolom Thotin Naw Nagga, Supem Hangum, Sandagiri Pawwa, Vine Katina Un, Hansa Geethaya, Nadan Punchi Hiramane, Neka Uyan Wathu and Ha Ha Balagenai. Many of the songs sung by Prapeeda express the knowledge of life and social consciousness, as well as the concepts of love, romance, elegance as well as elegance and wonderfully expressed house concepts.

Her maiden television acting came through Samugenime Nawathena with the role "Veena". She also sung the theme song of the serial with Amarasiri Peiris. Then she played the role of a dumb girl "Kisa" in the teledrama Dhawala Rathriya directed by Suda Mahadivulwewa. But she sang its background songs. Later she acted in Somaratne Dissanayake's serial Avasanda as "Soma" and title role of "Yashodara" in Thistha Jayawardena's serial Yashodara. She last starred in the teledrama Pinmada Puthuni directed by Malini Fonseka. Meanwhile, in 1997, he released a new collection of songs called 'Kandulu Thotupola'. Her third CD 'Sathyangana' was released in 2004 at the John de Silva Memorial Theater, Colombo. She selected to sing the songs of a new lyricist for her new CD 'Hendewata Kalin Enna' in 2012 where it was the first time that a new lyricist has put together as many as six songs at a time.

Pradeepa started playback singing for films with Christy Shelton's 1994 film Aragalaya. Since then, she rendered her voice for many films including Mario Jayatunga's Nidi Yahana Kalabei, Handana Kinkini, Miriwadi Sagalak, Saman Neelawathura's Savithrige Rathriya, Christy Shelton's Thahanam Gaha and Bennett Rathnayake's Ira Handa Yata. In 1997, she won both the Sarasaviya and Presidential Awards for Best Film Backing Singer for the serial Savithriyage Rathriya.

Then, Pradeepa was honored by the Colombo Tamil Association for her creative contribution to social harmony by singing the song Yal Devi at an awards ceremony organized to recognize great women on World Women's Day 2012. On 22 November 2017 her devoted fan Kasuni Nadeeka launched the book Gee Pradeepartha on Pradeepa's singing life and critical reviews of her songs. Gee Pradipartha (Pradeepa Dharmadasa Gee Ratnawali Rasavinisa) Book contains commentaries on 20 meaningful songs.

In 2018, she playback songs for the film Amawaka directed by Vijitha Gunaratne.

== Albums ==
Duwillen Seduna Liye	1992
Kandulu Thotupola	1997
Sathyangana	2004
Hendewata Kalin Enna	2012

== Labels ==
Musings
Torana
M Entertainment
Indhuwara Creations
