= My Red Comrade =

My Red Comrade රතු අතු අග
- Directed by: Sudath Mahaadivulwewa
- Written by: Sudath Mahaadivulwewa
- Produced by: Red Circle Production
- Starring: Asiri Allage; Tharindi Fernando
- Cinematography: Ruwan Costa
- Edited by: Ajith Ramanayake
- Music by: Nadeeka Guruge
- Distributed by: NFC cinema circuit
- Release date: 17 May 2024
- Running time: 90 minutes
- Country: Sri Lanka
- Language: Sinhala

My Red Comrade (Sinhala: රතු අතු අග), is a 2024 Sri Lankan Sinhalese political drama film directed by Sudath Mahaadivulwewa and produced by Red Circle Productions. The film features only two lead roles, both making their debut in cinema: Asiri Allage and Tharindi Fernando.

The special media screening was held at One Galle Face PVR Cinema on 1 May 2024. The film received positive reviews from critics for its theme and acting.

== Cast ==
- Asiri Allage as Red Comrade
- Tharindi Fernando as Strange girl

== Production and release ==
This is Sudath Mahaadivulwewa's second cinematic direction, after Sudu Kalu Saha Alu, which he directed 19 years ago in 2005. The lead actor Asiri Allage suffered tortured violent years in a concentration camp in real life, who later became a professional creative Sinhala copywriter.

The cinematography of the film was done by Ruwan Costa, and editing was done by Ajith Ramanayake. The cinematography was completed in a different format within four days, using only two characters, on the same backdrop of Sarasaviya Studio of the National Film Corporation. Art direction was done by Manjula Ayagama, Sound design by Sasika Marasinghe, and color combination by Tissa Surendra. Dinesh Lakdusinghe was the assistant director, Nimal Wijesiri Senadhira served as the production manager and Darshi Gamage as the line producer. Composition was done by Samarasiri Kandanage, with lyrics written by the director himself. Nadeeka Guruge was the music director, who also provided background vocals.
