= Raigam Tele'es Merit Awards =

The Raigam Tele'es Merit Awards are presented annually in Sri Lanka by the Kingdom of Raigam associated with many commercial brands to uplift the talent of Sri Lankan actors and actresses, as well as technical crew who gained positive reviews from critics for their role in television screen.

The award was first given in 2005.

== Award winners ==
Year	Award winner	Teledrama / Program
2004		
2005		
2006		
2007		
2008		
2009	Susiran de Silva	Isuru Bhavana
2009	Giriraj Kaushalya	Isuru Bhavana
2009	Dimuthu Chinthaka	Isuru Bhavana
2010		
2011	Himali Siriwardena	Sandagiri Pawwa
2011	Priyankara Rathnayake	Roles in Sulangata Enna Kiyanna and Kadadora
2011	Sriyantha Mendis	Athkanda Lihiniya
2011	TV Derana	360
2011	Bandula Padmakumara	Loka Sithiyama
2012	Hiru TV	Uththareethara program
2012	Santhusa Liyanage	Direction of Dooli Pintharu
2012	Sunil Mihindukula	Roopawalokana Vijaya Kumaranatunga program
2012	Indrasiri Suraweera	Production of Sanhinda musical program
2013	Thushari Abeysekara	-
2013	Lionel Wickrama	
2013	Rebeka Nirmali	
2014	Derrick Fernando	
2014	Anula Karunathilaka	
2014	Cyril Wickramage	
2015	Kanchanamala Mahavithana	Role Monika's mother of Aguru Siththam
2015	Andrew Jayamanne & Deepthi Wijetunga	Production of Diriya Doni
2015	Anula Bulathsinhala	Role Agnus of Yakada Doli
2016	Kadiresan Kathrik	Pavithra teledrama
2016	Lakmal Kirindigala	Premawathi Manamperi Tale program
2016	Namal Prasanna	Me Wage Diyaniyo program
2016	Kumara Thirimadura & Sarath Kothalawala	script of Graham Bell Wath Hithuwada program
2016	Wasanthi Nanayakkara	Wahi Peella program
2017	Mahesh Nissanka	Sihinayaki Ra musical program
2017	Wasanthi Ranwala	Lokantharayo and Mathu Sambandai teledramas
2017	Malkanthi Jayasinghe	Eka Gei Minissu teledrama
2017	Chamara Prasanna Kodithuwakku	Praana teledrama
2017	Indunil Dissanayake	For the role as a presenter (Sinhala)
2017	Noeline Hunter	For the role as a presenter (English)
2017	Suminda Sirisena	For decades of drama career
2018	Ravindra Guruge	For the contribution to Sri Lankan cinema
2018	Hemasiri Liyanage	For the contribution to Sri Lankan drama
2018	Dihan Kaveesha	For the role in Nibbutha Noona Saamaatha drama
2018	Himaya Witharana	For the role in Giri Durga drama
2019	Thilina Chamara Perera	Sanchara with Rohan Direkz program
2019	Diluka Prasad Gunathilake	For the contribution to promotion of tele film creations
2019	Geeth Rathnayake	For the role in Ado drama
2020	Thilini Jayamali	For the role in Loku Iskole Mahaththaya drama
2020	Pavithra Rupasinghe	For the script of Kaluwara Muhuda drama
2020	Dilka Samanmali	For hosting the program Defence the Nature
2020	Chaminda de Silva	For creating the program Lakshapana
2020	Vineetha Karunaratne	For hosting the program K. Gunaratnam biography
2020	Nilanka Dahanayake	For the role in Thanamalvila Kollek drama
2021	Chinthaka Gamlath	For making the musical program Prema Wada Sema
2021	Subuddi Lakmali	For the role in Sakarma drama
2021	Chameera Liyanage	For the role in Valawettuwa
2021	Sanka Niroshana	For creating the program V & M DTET
2021	Senaka Edirisinghe	For maiden drama direction of Gamane Yaa
2021	Prasad Kumasaru	For creating the program Pasa Saha Visa
2024	Kusal Damsith	For the role in teledrama Hapannu Api Game Rajje
2024	Thushara Niroshan; Aminda Weerakoon	For creating the program Magic Paena
2024	Aruna Soysa	For creating the program Senehase Lama Dinaya
