= Weda Hamine =

- DVD poster
- වෙද හාමිනේ
- Genre: Adventure; Romance
- Created by: Sunil Rathnayake
- Directed by: Jayantha Chandrasiri
- Starring: Kamal Addararachchi; Rebeka Nirmali; Chandani Seneviratne; Sriyantha Mendis
- Voices of: Rosco Williams; Pradeepa Dharmadasa; Malani Bulathsinhala
- Theme music composer: Premasiri Khemadasa
- Opening theme: Duwillen Sadunu Liye
- Country of origin: Sri Lanka
- Original language: Sinhala
- No. of seasons: 1
- No. of episodes: 12

Production
- Executive producer: Jayantha Chandrasiri
- Running time: 21 to 24 minutes

Original release
- Network: Sri Lanka Rupavahini Corporation
- Release: 1990

Weda Hamine is a Sri Lankan television drama that originally aired on the Sri Lanka Rupavahini Corporation in 1990. Directed by Jayantha Chandrasiri, the series marked his directorial debut in television. Filmed in 1988 and broadcast two years later, the drama explores the journey of a young man as he uncovers the intricacies of his father's life and romantic entanglements. The cast features Rebeka Nirmali in the title role, supported by Kamal Addararachchi, Sriyantha Mendis, and Edward Gunawardhana.

== Plot ==
In 1990, Deemantha is a young dancing teacher. He is diagnosed with lung cancer, shocking his mother, Maya, and adoptive father, Dharmapriya. Deemantha thinks that his late father, Gunendra has died from the same type of cancer. However, Dharmapriya informs him that Gunendra's death was not due to cancer and decides to tell him the story of Gunendra's life.

The story flashes back to 1958 when Gunendra and Dharmapriya were best friends. Gunendra is a rich businessman who is also able to play music. At a party, he is diagnosed with lung cancer. His doctor warns that Gunendra's life expectancy is a mere 3 months. Meanwhile, A man named Appuhami meets Dharmapriya to post an advertisement about an Ayurvedic doctor in rural village, Thalakiriagama, who cured cancer. Gunendra travels to the doctor, who cures him and advises him to stay away from alcohol. But, after returning, Gunendra continues to drink alcohol, to the dismay of his wife, Maya and Dharmapriya. As a result of this, He is diagnosed with cancer again after 2 years.

Gunendra returns to Thalakiriyagama and learns that the doctor had died before 6 months. He is shocked and tries to return but doctor's daughter, Mangali manages to cure him. Gunendra realizes that he has fallen in love with Mangali and marries her.

After some time, Gunendra returns and lives with Maya who is pregnant now. From Appuhami, Dharmapriya finds out that Mangali is also pregnant with Gunendra's child. He gets angry and informs Gunendra, who later visits Mangali. Mangali advises him to keep his marriage with Maya. Gunendra commits suicide at a beach and Dharmapriya takes Maya's responsibility. After that, both Maya and Mangali give birth to boys. Maya names her child Deemantha. The past story ends after that.

The day after hearing the story, a shocked Deemantha visits Thalakiriyagama with his mother and uncle. Mangali is now grown old and lives with her son. She sees Dharmapriya, Maya, and Deemantha and is amazed. Finally, she tells her son that his relatives have come.

== Cast ==
- Kamal Addararachchi as Gunendra / Deemantha
- Rebeka Nirmali as Mangali aka Wedahamine
- Chandani Seneviratne as Maya
- Sriyantha Mendis as Dharmapriya
- Edward Gunawardhana as Sinhala Doctor
- Elan Silvester as Sinhala Doctor's wife
- Wasantha Vittachchi as Appuhami
- Jackson Anthony as Anthony
- Upatissa Balasuriya as Gunasinghe
- Mahendra Perera as Violin Player (Cameo)
- H. A. Perera as Dharmapriya's officer (Guest)

== Songs ==
The score consists of two songs:

- "Duwillen Sadunu Liye" - Pradeepa Dharmadasa
- "Sandaken Daharin" - Malani Bulathsinhala
