= Uddika Premarathna =

Sri Lankan actor and former politician (born 1980)

Hon. Uddika Premarathna
- උද්දික ප්‍රේමරත්න

Member of Parliament for Anuradhapura District
- In office 20 August 2020 – 27 February 2024
- Succeeded by: Sarath Chandrasiri Muthukumarana
- Majority: 133,550 preferential votes

Personal details
- Born: 16 September 1980 (age 46) Anuradhapura, Sri Lanka
- Party: Jathika Nidahas Peramuna
- Other political affiliations: Supreme Lanka Coalition (since 2022); Sri Lanka People's Freedom Alliance (2019–2022)
- Height: 1.75 m (5 ft 9 in)
- Spouse: Anusha Kumari Pannala
- Children: 1
- Education: St Joseph's College, Anuradhapura
- Occupation: Politician
- Profession: Actor, singer
- Website: uddikapremarathna.com

Uddika Premarathna (born 16 September 1980; උද්දික ප්‍රේමරත්න) is a Sri Lankan actor, singer, television announcer and former member of parliament. He is an actor in Sri Lankan cinema and television.

== Personal life ==
Premarathna is married to Anusha Kumari Pannala. The couple has one son, Angsh Prachien, who was born on 24 April 2013.

== Acting career ==
Premarathna made his cinema debut in 2011 Buddhist film Mahindagamanaya in a minor role. In 2013, he rose to prominence as the main role in Samanala Sandhawaniya, playing the role of Vadisha Wikramanayaka. The film successfully completed 100 days in theaters.

Premarathna was nominated for "Most Popular Actor" at the 2014 Hiru Golden Film Awards. He also won "Best Actor" at the 2014 Sumathi Awards for his performance.

In 2015, Premarathna was cast for the role of King Dutugemunu in blockbuster film Maharaja Gemunu directed by Jayantha Chandrasiri. The film was awarded Most Popular Movie at the 2016 Hiru Golden Film Awards. In 2017, Premarathna acted in two films. He played the main role of King Walagamba in epic historical film Aloko Udapadi, which was critically acclaimed. In children's film Paha Samath, Premarathna played the role of Samath's crippled father.

In 2019, Premarathna acted in thriller action film Rush as the lead character, Rashan 'Rush' Wijemanna. He described the role as completely different from his previous roles, most of which were Sinhalese kings and monarchs.

In 2020, a series of drama and performing workshops organized by the Ape Maga Foundation, led by Premarathna, were held on 5 and 6 August 2020 at the North Central Provincial Auditorium in Anuradhapura.

== Political career ==
In 2020, Premarathna was announced as a candidate in the 2020 parliamentary elections for the Anuradhapura District as a member of the Sri Lanka People's Freedom Alliance. He was successfully elected to a seat in the 16th Parliament of Sri Lanka, winning 133,550 preferential votes.

Electoral history of Uddika Premarathna
Election	Constituency	Party	Alliance	Votes	Result
2020 parliamentary	Anuradhapura District	Jathika Nidahas Peramuna	Sri Lanka People's Freedom Alliance	133,550	Elected

=== Assassination attempt ===
On 17 September 2023, Premarathna narrowly escaped an assassination attempt at his residence in Anuradhapura. Unidentified gunmen opened fire at Premarathna as he was getting out from his car. Premarathna was unharmed in the incident.

=== Resignation and asylum seeking ===
Since late 2023, Premarathna had reportedly been seeking political asylum in Canada. He and his family departed to Dubai in December 2023 with intentions to travel to Canada, utilizing his diplomatic passport for the journey. On 27 February 2024, Premarathna resigned from his parliamentary seat while in Canada. The Sunday Times alleged that Premarathna's assassination attempt the previous year was a fabricated attack to strengthen his asylum claim. Premarathna, however, has claimed he is only seeking a work visa.

== Filmography ==
Key
†	Denotes films that have not yet been released

Year	Film	Role	Ref.
2011	Mahindagamanaya	Seru	
2013	Samanala Sandhawaniya	Vadisha Wikramanayaka	
2014	Duwana Muwan	Amara	
2015	Maharaja Gemunu	King Dutugamunu	
2016	Paththini	Kovalan	
2017	Aloko Udapadi	King Valagamba	
2017	Paha Samath	Samath's Father	
2019	Rush	Rashan 'Rush'	
2023	Midunu Vishwaya	Varenya	
2024	Sihinayaki Adare	Ajith Bandara	
2025	Mr. Missis	Anushka Perera, Piyadasi (dual role)	
TBA	Raavana †		
TBA	Pathikulaya †		

=== Selected television serials ===
- Bonda Meedum as Senaka
- Eka Gei Minissu as Jagdish
- Girikula
- Me Suramya Paradisaya as Mahathun
- Mini Gan Dela as Aranolis
- Paara Dige as Rehan Aluvihare
- Renagala Walawwa as Malan
- Sihinayaki Jeewithe
- Sillara Kasi as Niketha

== Songs ==
- Adare Kalath
- Nethu Addara
- Mage Wela Mage

== Awards ==
=== OCIC Awards ===
Year	Nominee / work	Award	Result
2016	Samanala Sandhawaniya	Best Actor	Won

=== Sumathi Awards ===
Year	Nominee / work	Award	Result
2019	Minigandela	Best Actor	Won
2023	People's vote	Most Popular Actor	Won

=== Raigam Tele'es ===
Year	Nominee / work	Award	Result
2023	People's vote	Most Popular Actor	Won
