= Silent Violence =

Silent Violence may refer to:

- Silent Violence, 1983 book by Michael Watts
- "Silent Violence", song from Haunted (Six Feet Under album)
- "Silent Violence", song by Sepultura Machine Messiah (album)

== See also ==
- Duwana Muwan (A silent violence) (Sinhalese: දුවන මුවන්) 2014 Sri Lankan Sinhala children's film directed by Indra Weerasekara
