= Marasinghe =

Marasinghe (Sinhala: මාරසිංහ, romanized: Mārasiṁha) is a Sinhalese surname. Notable people with the surname include:

- Ashu Marasinghe (born 1971), Sri Lankan academic and politician
- Lakshman Marasinghe, Sri Lankan academic and lawyer
- Navaratne Marasinghe, Sri Lankan judge of the Court of Appeal
- Rohini Marasinghe, Sri Lankan puisne justice of the Supreme Court
