= Rebeka Nirmali =

Sri Lankan actress

Rebeka Nirmali රෙබෙකා නිර්මලී
- Born: 27 November 1964; Anuradhapura,Sri Lanka
- Died: 13 August 2014 (aged 49); Maharagama Cancer Hospital,Sri Lanka
- Resting place: Borella General Cemetery
- Education: Nivanthaka Chethiya Vidyalaya, Anuradhapura
- Occupations: Actress, Dramatist
- Years active: 1987–2014
- Known for: Weda Hamine
- Children: Anne Niroshani

Rebeka Nirmali (27 November 1964 – 13 August 2014 as රෙබෙකා නිර්මලී) [Sinhala]), also as Rebecca Nirmali was an actress in Sri Lankan cinema, theater and television. A highly versatile actress with a career spanned more than 25 years, Nirmali is best known for her role in the television serial Weda Hamine.

She died on 13 August 2014 while receiving treatments at Maharagama Cancer Hospital at the age of 49.

== Personal life ==
Nirmali was born on 27 November 1964 in Anuradhapura. She completed education from Nivanthaka Chethiya Vidyalaya, Anuradhapura. She has one daughter - Anne Niroshani, was born in 1987.

== Career ==
She moved to Colombo and started a drama career through the stage plays Lokaya Suddai and Sudu Samanalayo in 1987. Then she acted in popular plays Uthure Rahula and Amal Biso as a leading actress. Her turning point in her acting career came through the 1990 blockbuster television serial Weda Hamine, directed by Jayantha Chandrasiri. Then, she acted in more than 150 teledramas across many genres.

She started her film career with the 2003 comedy film Aladinge Weldin, directed by Upali Piyaratne. Then, she acted in supportive roles in the films Ira Sewaya, Uththara, and Samanala Sandhawaniya. She also worked in Indian production 'Kangalil Kaithi Seithen, directed by Bharathi Raja. Her last appearance in cinema came through Wimal Alahakoon's movie Maw Senehasa.

=== Notable theater works ===
- Lokaya Suddai
- Sudu Samanalayo
- Uthure Rahula
- Amal Biso

=== Notable television works ===
- Aaratie
- Adara Sandawaniya
- Adarawanthayo
- Adariye
- Ahankara Nagare
- Akala Sandya
- Ananthaya
- Anavaratha
- Angana
- Angani
- Anne
- Aparna
- Bath Amma
- Bhavathra
- Dandubasnamanaya
- Dangamalla
- Diya Sayam
- Diya Sithuvam
- E brain
- Gini Weluma
- Himagira Naga
- Indikadolla
- Jeewithaya Sundarai
- Kadulu Thahanchiya
- Kapa Nasna Samaya
- Katu Kurullo
- Kedella Neha Unusum
- Kethumathi Neyo
- Kinduru Adaviya
- Mage Kaviya Mata Denna
- Mage Sanda Oba
- Magi
- Maya Agni
- Minipura Hatana
- Monarathenna
- Naana Kamare
- Nagenahira Weralina Asena
- Nisala Diya Sasala Viya
- Paasku
- Pata Veeduru
- Pingala Danawwa
- Piniwessa
- Piyavi
- Ranthaliya Walawwa
- Samanala Sihinaya
- Saranganaa
- Satharadenek Senpathiyo
- Sekku Gedara
- Sihina Kumari
- Sihina Sithuwam
- Situ Medura
- Snehaye Daasi
- Sohayuro
- Somapura Weerayo
- Veda Hamine
- Wanabime Sirakaruwo
- Wara Peraliya
- Wasana Wewa
- Wassana Sihinaya
- Waraamal
- Weda Hamine
- Wediya Rella

== Awards and Accolades ==
=== Raigam Tele'es ===
Year	Nominee / work	Award	Result
2014		Raigam Tele'es Merit Award	Won

=== OCIC Awards ===
Year	Nominee / work	Award	Result
2009	Nagenahira Weralina Asena	Best Actress	Nominated

=== State Drama Festival ===
Year	Nominee / work	Award	Result
2008	Nagenahira Weralina Asena	Best Supporting Actress	Nominated

== Death ==
She had cervical cancer since 2007, and the symptoms had come to light in a very short period. She was hospitalized in May 2014 and continued treatments for three months. According to the Deputy Director of Cancer Hospital, Dr. Wasantha Dissanayaka, when radiotherapy was unsuccessful, Nirmali received chemotherapy treatment.

However, she died on 13 August 2014 while receiving treatments at Maharagama Cancer Hospital. Her remains were kept in a private funeral house in Borella and were then moved to Kala Bhawana on Thursday for final rites. The funeral took place on Thursday evening at the Borella General Cemetery.

On 18 August 2014, an alms-giving was performed at Amarawathi Buddhist Temple in London.

== Filmography ==
Year	Film	Role	Ref.
1994	Nohadan Landune	Silawathi	
2003	Aladinge Waldin	Kasturi's aunt	
2004	Samawenna Maa Raththarane		
2010	Uththara	Rupa	
2013	Samanala Sandhawaniya		
2015	Ira Sewaya	Loraine	
2015	Maharaja Gemunu		
2019	Sangile	Sangile's mother	
