= Kandak Sema =

Kandak Sema කන්දක් සේමා
- Directed by: Asoka Athaudahetti; Tao Nashimoto
- Written by: Sumithra Rahubaddhe
- Based on: Novel by Sumithra Rahubaddhe
- Produced by: Jayantha Hettiarachchi; Ashu Marasinghe; Samanmalee Padmakumara; Sumithra Rahubaddhe
- Starring: Nirosha Perera; Jun Etoh; Ayako Kobayashi
- Cinematography: Ruwan Costa
- Edited by: Ajith Ramanayake
- Music by: Suresh Maliyadde
- Distributed by: EAP Theatres
- Release date: 2 November 2023
- Country: Sri Lanka
- Language: Sinhala
- Budget: LKR 80 Million

Kandak Sema (Like a Mountain) (Sinhala: කන්දක් සේමා) is a 2023 Sri Lankan Sinhalese language romantic drama film directed by Asoka Athaudahetti and co-directed by Tao Nashimotho. The film is co-produced by Sumithra Rahubaddhe, Jayantha Hettiarachchi, Ashu Marasinghe and Samanmalee Padmakumara. It stars Nirosha Perera and Japanese actor Jun Etoh in lead roles along with Japanese actress Ayako Kobayashi with Bimal Jayakody in supportive roles. Music composed by Suresh Maliyadde. The film is based on the novel written by Sumithra Rahubaddhe and her script.

The film received mixed reviews from critics.

== Cast ==
- Nirosha Perera as Nupa
- Jun Etoh as Masaya San
- Ayako Kobayashi as Sora San
- Dineth De Silva
- Bimal Jayakody as Sumal
- Cyril Wickramage
- Veena Jayakody
- Chandani Seneviratne
- Wasantha Kotuwella
- Kaushalya Fernando
- Priyankara Rathnayake
- Vishwajith Gunasekara
- Jayani Senanayake
- Dasun Pathirana
- Lakshman Mendis
- Pubudu Chathuranga

== Production ==
Kandak Sema is a 2009 novel by Sri Lankan author Sumithra Rahubaddhe. The book won all five awards in 2010 from five literary festivals in Sri Lanka. It is about a young Sri Lankan woman from an impoverished family who marries a Japanese farmer to escape poverty. The book was adapted into the film where popular Oshin actress, Ayako Kobayashi made her acting debut in Sri Lankan Sinhala language cinema in a supporting role.
