= Sumathi Best Teledrama Director Award =

The Sumathi Best Teledrama Director Award is presented annually in Sri Lanka by the Sumathi Group of Campany associated with many commercial brands for the best Sri Lankan director of the year in television screen.

The award was first given in 1995. Following is a list of the winners of this prestigious title since then.

Year	Best Director	Teledrama	Ref.
1995	Jayantha Chandrasiri	Dandubasnamanaya	
1996	Wimalarathna Adhikari	Isiwara Gedara	
1997	Tissa Abeysekara	Pitagamkarayo	
1998	Asoka Handagama	Diyaketa Pahana	
1999	Prasanna Jayakody	Nisala Wila	
2000	Prasanna Jayakody	Imadiya Mankada	
2001	Ananda Fonseka	Kemmura	
2002	Prasanna Jayakody	Sanda Amawakai	
2003	Prasanna Jayakody	Hada Wila Sakmana	
2004	Ananda Abenayake	Ramya Suramya	
2006	Lalith Rathnayake	Theth Saha Wiyali	
2007	Jaynake Suranjith	Wasantha Kusalana	
2008	Senesh Dissanaike Bandara	Rala Bidena Thana	
2009	Jayantha Chandrasiri	Sathara Denek Senpathiyo	
2010	D.G Somapala	Ridee Ittankaraya	
2011	Ananda Abenayake	Thaksalawa	
2012	Sudath Rohana	Swayanjatha	
2013	Christy Shelton Fernando	Me Wasantha Kalayay	
2014	Ananda Abenayake	Appachchi	
2015	Ananda Abenayake	Chess	
2016	Jackson Anthony	Daskon	
2017	Sumith Rathnayake	Maddahana	
2018	Jackson Anthony	See Raja	
2019	Lalith Rathnayake	Thaththa	
2021	Ananda Abenayake	Weeraya Gedara Awith	
