= Bonda Meedum =

Sri Lankan television series

- Official Poster
- Also known as: බොඳ මීදුම්
- Genre: Romance
- Based on: Bonda Meedum by Sujeewa Prasanna Arachchi
- Directed by: Chandika Wijayasena
- Starring: Udari Warnakulasooriya; Saranga Disasekara; Gayan Wickramathilaka; Buddhadasa Vithanarachchi
- Country of origin: Sri Lanka
- Original language: Sinhala
- No. of episodes: 250

Production
- Producer: Upul Jayasinghe with Independent Television Network

Original release
- Network: Independent Television Network
- Release: 15 September 2010 – 2 September 2011

Related
- Ithin Eeta Passe; Sihina Piyapath

Bonda Meedum (Sinhala: බොඳ මීදුම්) is a Sri Lankan television drama based on "Bonda Meedum", a popular series of novels created by Sri Lankan writer Sujeewa Prasanna Arachchi. The series debuted on 15 September 2010 and concluded on 2 September 2011. Independent Television Network was the official broadcaster for the serial. Screening at the 8.30 pm slot, the teledrama exceeded even the popularity of the novel. Udari Warnakulasooriya and Saranga Disasekara were awarded most popular female and male actors of the year, respectively, at the 16th Sumathi Awards 2011.

== Plot ==
Dhanuka is a handsome, innocent boy in his early 20s. He lives in Matale with his parents and sister. His father, Dharmasena sends him to his best friend, Senarath Maliyadda, who is a rich businessman in Nawala, in order to get a job at his company. Dhanuka arrives to Maliyadda's house and Maliyadda treats him as his own son. But, Maliyadda's only daughter, Sansala treats Dhanuka as an outsider and insults him at multiple times. She has received a marriage proposal from her elder cousin, Saliya, who only loves her to get property. Dhanuka doesn't care about Sansala's misdeeds and slowly loves her. His manager, Senaka realizes Dhanuka's matter and supports him.

Soon, Saliya's mother learns about Dhanuka and plans to send him again to Matale. Then, Saliya's sister calls to Maliyadda's house and introduces her as Dhanuka's girlfriend. Sansala treats him badly, leading Dhanuka to breakdown and leave home. Sansala regrets and feels for Dhanuka slowly. Later, she learns about her aunt's plan and forgives Dhanuka.

Sansala now spends time sadly because of Saliya's behavior. At temple, Both Dhanuka and Sansala confess their love to each other. Dhanuka promises Sansala to save her from Saliya. Saliya has a secret girlfriend, Minoli. Saliya misbehaves with Sansala and Dhanuka warns him. To avenge, He reveals Maliyadda about Sansala and Dhanuka's relationship. Enraged, Maliyadda expels Dhanuka from his job and fixes Sansala and Saliya's marriage, much to Sansala's dismay. Dhanuka gets a waiter job at hotel, but has to quit it after meeting Maliyadda and Sansala accidentally in hotel.

Saliya continues to blackmail Sansala. Her servant, Kamala tells her to escape from home. But, before the wedding day, Saliya gets arrested at Maliyadda's house for a robbery. Seeing Saliya's reality, Maliyadda breaks all ties with him. Dhanuka does some part-time jobs at town with his best friend, Viraj. Dharmasena passes away from a heart attack. After that, Maliyadda decides to help them.

Saliya returns and beats Sansala, who falls into a coma. Saliya is sentenced for 4 years. Maliyadda realizes his mistake and accepts Dhanuka. Dhanuka starts Sansala's treatment from an ayurvedic doctor, who reveals him that Sansala's recovery time is uncertain. With the help of his family and friends, Dhanuka opens a farm and eventually becomes successful. 4 years later, Saliya is released from jail and he shares a bond with a little girl, Shanali. He is injured in a bomb blast. Before dying, Saliya learns that Shanali is being his and Minoli's daughter. At the end, Sansala wakes up from coma and is fully recovered. Finally, Dhanuka and Sansala reunite to live happily.

== Cast ==
=== Main ===
- Udari Warnakulasooriya as Sansala Maliyadda Dharmasena – Senarath's daughter; Kasun's sister; Saliya and Darshani's cousin; Saliya's ex-fiancée; Dhanuka's wife
- Saranga Disasekara as Dhanuka Dharmasena – Mr. Dharmasena and Vimala's son; Iroshini's brother; Viraj's best friend; Sansala's husband

=== Supporting ===
- Gayan Wickramathilaka as Saliya Silva – Charuni and Douglas's son; Darshani's brother; Sansala and Kasun's cousin; Sansala's ex-fiancé; Minoli's lover; Shanali's father (Dead)
- Buddhadasa Vithanarachchi as Senarath Maliyadda – Charuni and Aruni's brother; Mr. Dharmasena's best friend; Sansala and Kasun's father
- Janak Premalal as Mr. Dharmasena – Senarath's best friend; Vimala's husband; Dhanuka and Iroshini's father (Dead)
- Madhani Malwaththa as Vimala Dharmasena – Mr. Dharmasena's wife; Dhanuka and Iroshini's mother
- Thishuna Perera as Kasun Maliyadda – Senarath's son; Sansala's brother; Saliya and Darshani's cousin
- Meena Kumari as Charuni Maliyadda Silva – Senarath and Aruni's sister; Douglas's wife; Saliya and Darshani's mother
- Anushi Rajapaksha as Aruni Maliyadda – Senarath and Charuni's sister; Saliya, Darshani, Sansala and Kasun's aunt
- Uddika Premarathna as Senaka – Dhanuka's former manager and friend; Darshani's husband
- Chathurani Nuwangika as Darshani Silva – Charuni and Douglas's daughter; Saliya's sister; Sansala and Kasun's cousin; Senaka's wife
- Rajitha Hiran as Kumara – Male servant at Maliyadda's house
- Gayana Sudharshani as Kamala – Female servant at Maliyadda's house
- Ananda Wickramage as Douglas Silva – Charuni's husband; Saliya and Darshani's father
- Piyumi Purasinghe as Iroshini Dharmasena – Mr. Dharmasena and Vimala's daughter; Dhanuka's sister; Viraj's wife
- Sanjula Diwarathna as Viraj – Dhanuka's best friend; Iroshini's husband
- Akila Sandakelum as Asanga – Dharshani's ex-fiancé (Dead)
- Gihan Fernando as Palawaththe Victor – Minoli's brother; Saliya's rival
- Gayesha Perera as Minoli – Saliya's lover; Shanali's mother
- Roopa Gomas as Minoli and Victor's aunt
- Sada Mihiri Amrasingha as Mayumi – Sansala's best friend
- Manjula Moragaha as Agriculture Inspector – A young man who shows interest to Iroshini
- Wasantha Kumaravila as Chaliya – One of Saliya's sidekicks
- Rohan Ranatunga as Sumith – One of Saliya's sidekicks
- G. R. Perera as Habarana Weda Mahattaya – Ayurvedic doctor who recovered Sansala

== Music ==
- Sihina Isawwen Enna – Amila Nadeeshani, Surendra Perera

== Awards ==
- The most popular actress of the year (16th Sumathi Tele Awards 2011): Udari Warnakulasuriya (Bonda Meedum)
- The most popular actor of the year (16th Sumathi Tele Awards 2011): Saranga Disasekara (Bonda Meedum)

== Slogan ==
- Sinhala: ජීවත්වන්නෙත් – මියයන්නෙත් ඔබේ ආදරය වෙනුවෙනි...
