= Gunananda Himi Migettuwatte =

- Directed by: Sisil Gunesekera
- Written by: Sisil Gunesekera
- Produced by: Sisil Gunesekera; Kamal Karunanayake
- Starring: Roger Seneviratne; Suranga Ranawaka; Priyankara Rathnayake
- Cinematography: Kapila Wijeratne
- Edited by: Pravin Jayaratne
- Music by: Nilatha Sri Pathirana
- Country: Sri Lanka
- Language: Sinhala

Gunananda Himi Migettuwatte (Sinhala: ගුණානන්ද හිමි මිගෙට්ටුවත්තේ) is an upcoming Sri Lankan Sinhala biographical patriotic film directed by Sisil Gunesekera and co-produced by director himself with Kamal Karunanayake. The film is about the life of Venarable Migettuwatte Gunananda Thero, who was a Buddhist monk and hero of the Panadura debate during British colonial time. It stars Roger Seneviratne in lead role along with Suranga Ranawaka, Priyankara Rathnayake and Lucky Dias. Music composed by Nilatha Sri Pathirana.

== Production ==
The film has been shot on location at Kosgoda, Balapitiya, Dambulla, Kalutara, Panadura and Kotahena areas, with filming being completed in 34 days.

== Cast ==
- Roger Seneviratne as Migel aka Gunananda Thero
- Suranga Ranawaka
- Priyankara Rathnayake
- Lucky Dias
- Wimalindra Kumari
- Vasanthi Chathurani
- Buddhadasa Vithanarachchi
- Douglas Ranasinghe
- Daya Thennakoon
- Palitha Silva
- Wijeratne Warakagoda
- Wasantha Vittachchi
- Ramani Siriwardena
- D. B. Gangodathenna
- Somaweera Gamage
- Methyl Jayasuriya as Litte Migel
