= Yashoda Wimaladharma =

Sri Lankan actress and presenter

Yashodha Wimaladharma
- Born: Yashodha Wimaladharma; 28 October 1970 (age 56); Colombo, Sri Lanka
- Occupations: Actress, Model, Presenter
- Years active: 1993-present
- Parents: Ravilal Wimaladharma (father); Mallika Wimaladharma (mother)
- Relatives: Bandula Vithanage (uncle); Nalaka Vithanage (cousin)

Yashoda Wimaladharma (Sinhala: යශෝධා විමලධර්ම) is a Sri Lankan actress in Sri Lankan cinema, stage drama and television. Often referred to as the "innocent on the small screen", Wimaladharma excelled in cinema, television and theatre in a career spanning more than three decades. Through her experience in domestic and foreign cinema, she is also working as a jury member of foreign cinema festivals.

== Biography ==
Yashoda Wimaladharma was born on 28 October 1970 in Sri Lanka to Ravilal Wimaladharma, a Hindi language lecturer at University of Kelaniya and Mallika Wimaladharma, a former dancer and school teacher. Her sister Thusitha, now a school teacher, is seven years older than Yashoda. She has a master's degree in Hindi and fluent in the language.

Wimaladharma attended St. Paul’s Girls School, Milagiriya in Colombo.

== Career ==
She was invited to act in the teledrama Atta Bindei in 1988 directed by her uncle Bandula Vithanage. This marks the beginning of her drama career. Yashoda made her cinema debut in 1990 from the film titled Gurugedara (Teacher's home) directed by Vijaya Dharmasiri, and also won the merit award for this film at Sarasaviya Film Festival in 1993.

Yashoda hosted her personal website (www.yashodaw.com) on 18 June 2003 the ceremony was held at Galadari Hotel, Colombo. This was the first-ever website hosted by a Sri Lankan actress. In 1999, she made her first song lyrics titled Thugu Girikulu. The song was sung by Dayan Witharana and the music was composed by Rohana Weerasinghe.

In 2019, she became the first Sri Lanka to appointed as a judge in international film festival.

== Filmography ==
Key
†	Denotes films that have not yet been released

Year	Film	Language	Role
1992	Guru Gedara	Sinhala	Neela
1992	Aacharyan (Guru)	Malayalam	Rekha
1993	Le Prix d'une Femme (The price of a woman)	French	Kusum
1995	Maruthaya	Sinhala	Renuka
1996	Mother Teresa: In the Name of God's Poor	English	Sister Maria
1996	Tea Garden, Music Garden, Flower Garden	French	
1996	Sihina Deshayen	Sinhala	Theatre actress
1997	Duwata Mawaka Misa	Sinhala	Kusum
1997	Iqbal (Carpet weaver)	Italy	Fathima
1999	Theertha Yatra	Sinhala	Menaka
2000	Return to Bangalore	Pakistan	Radha
2001	Anantha Rathriya	Sinhala	Narmada
2002	Agnidahaya	Sinhala	Kirimanike
2002	Kalu Sudu Mal	Sinhala	Mala
2005	Guerilla Marketing	Sinhala	Suramya
2010	Kshema Bhoomi	Sinhala	Damayanthi
2013	Samanala Sandhawaniya	Sinhala	Punya
2015	Maharaja Gemunu	Sinhala	Queen Dharithri
2018	Vaishnavee	Sinhala	Vaishnavi, the Tree Goddess
2018	Gharasarapa	Sinhala	
2019	Solar Eclipse	English	
2019	Asandhimitta	Sinhala	Vasanthi
2023	Guththila	Sinhala	Chunna
2024	Sinhabahu	Sinhala	Suppa Devi
TBA	Front Page Wedding †	English	
