= Ira Sewaya =

- Sinhala: ඉර සේවය
- Directed by: Rodney Widanapathirana
- Written by: Rodney Widanapathirana
- Produced by: Kanthi Alahakone
- Starring: Wimal Alahakone; Rebeka Nirmali; Maureen Charuni
- Cinematography: Ranga Kariyawasam; Chaminda Dissanayake; Kapila Thilakarathne
- Edited by: Wiranga Katipearachchi; Madura Prasad
- Music by: Manoj Peiris
- Production companies: Bombay Movie Lab, Mumbai
- Distributed by: CEL Theatres
- Release date: 19 June 2015
- Country: Sri Lanka
- Language: Sinhala

Ira Sewaya (Sun Rise) (Sinhala: ඉර සේවය) is a 2015 Sri Lankan Sinhala drama film directed by Rodney Widanapathirana and produced by Kanthi Alahakone. It stars Wimal Alahakone and Rebeka Nirmali in lead roles along with Maureen Charuni and Ishara Wickremasinghe. Music composed by Manoj Peiris. Film was screened after the death of main actress Rebecca Nirmali. The film has been shot in Sri Lanka and England both. It is the 1244th Sri Lankan film in the Sinhala cinema. It was also screened in Nepal organized by Embassy of Sri Lanka in Kathmandu. The film was re-screened in 2021 at Ananda cinema in Gampola.

== Cast ==
- Wimal Alahakone as Nalaka Sapumal Bandara
- Rebeka Nirmali as Lorain
- Maureen Charuni as Yvonne
- Ishara Wickremasinghe as Monk
- Samson Siripala
- Saman Almeida
- Sarath Chandrasiri
- Gamini Samarakoon

== Awards ==
- Best upcoming Actor at Sarasaviya Film Festival 2016 - Ishara Wickremasinghe

== Soundtrack ==
No.	Title	Singer(s)	Length
1.	"Duwili Nagare"	Kithsiri Jayasekara
2.	"Sapiruna Soda Uwana"	Chandraratne Ileperuma
