= Asu (film) =

2021 Sri Lankan drama film

- Theatrical release poster
- Directed by: Sanjeewa Pushpakumara
- Written by: Sanjeewa Pushpakumara; Sangeetha Nilnadee Godagama
- Based on: breast cancer
- Produced by: Sanjeewa Pushpakumara; Amil Abeysundara
- Starring: Udari Warnakulasooriya; Shyam Fernando; Dinara Punchihewa
- Cinematography: Vishwa Balasooriya
- Edited by: Ajith Ramanayake
- Music by: Ajith Kumarasiri; Namini Panchala
- Production companies: Sapushpa Expressions; Petra Films
- Release dates: November 2021 (Tokyo); October 11, 2023 (Sri Lanka)
- Country: Sri Lanka
- Language: Sinhala

Asu (Sinhala: ආසූ, lit. 'Arrived') is a 2021 Sri Lankan Sinhala-language drama film produced, written and directed by Sanjeewa Pushpakumara. The film stars Udari Warnakulasooriya, Shyam Fernando and Dinara Punchihewa in the main lead roles. The film story was inspired based on the tragic death of Indira Jayasuriya who succumbed to the breast cancer in November 2016 at the age of 40. Indira Jayasuriya was the youngest daughter of former parliamentary speaker Karu Jayasuriya.

The film was officially selected for competition at the 2021 Asian World Film Festival which was held in Los Angeles. The film was also officially selected in the Asian Competition's Feature section at the 34th edition of the 2021 Tokyo International Film Festival. The film had its theatrical release in Sri Lanka on 11 October 2023 and opened to positive reviews from critics. The film had its first local premiere at the PVR Cinema Complex at One Galle Face on 11 October 2023.

== Plot ==
Nelum, a 31 year old woman is a Buddhist and belongs to upper class category. She was happily married to a musician husband and the couple lived with three year old daughter. Nelum eventually becomes pregnant. Things change dramatically when her family members were informed about the fact that she was diagnosed with breast cancer. To add to the misery, she is battling with last stage of the breast cancer. Nelum takes a calculated risk by not opting for a medical surgery instead she expects to battle the cancer, thereby sacrificing her life in order to safeguard her unborn baby from danger.

The family members were caught up in huge dilemma as both lives of Nelum and baby were in danger and also only one of them can be safeguarded according to the doctors. Nelum's firm decision contradicted the views of her husband as her husband wanted to rescue her from the fatal cancer and he even was willing to sacrifice the unborn baby. The doctors too were confronted with the conundrum as they were also fighting to safeguarding the life of Nelum.

Nelum delivers the baby boy after seven months of pregnancy and the boy was named as Gautham as an honour to Lord Buddha. Nelum's medical conditions worsened further after her baby boy turns three months old. Nelum becomes emotional as she writes a heart touching letter to her newborn baby boy at a time when she was nearing the last phase of her lifetime. Her son would then open up the letter and realizes the tragic death of his mother at the age of ten.

== Cast ==
- Udari Warnakulasooriya as Nelum
- Shyam Fernando
- Chandani Seneviratne
- Somaratne Dissanayake
- Dinara Punchihewa
- Yasodha Rasaduni
- Athula Veragoda
- Swethaki Wadisinghe
- Renuka Balasuriya

== Production ==
The film had VFX portions which were produced by Rashitha Jinasena and the VFX portions were supervised by Dulanka Devendra. Aruna Priyantha Kaluarachchi was roped in for sound editing works while Poorna Jayasri was roped in as the art director of the film. Narada Dananji Thotagamuwa was onboard to focus on the makeup proceedings while Ajantha Alahakoon took charge of costume for the actors. The film was bankrolled by Sapushpa Expressions.
