= Paya Enna Hiru Se =

- Sinhala: පායා එන්න හිරු සේ
- Directed by: Udayakantha Warnasuriya
- Written by: Nishantha Weerasinghe
- Produced by: Evoke Films
- Starring: Ranjan Ramanayake; Udari Warnakulasooriya; Bimal Jayakody; Sriyantha Mendis
- Cinematography: Ayeshman Hettiarachchi
- Edited by: Ravindra Guruge
- Music by: Rohana Weerasinghe
- Release date: 21 November 2009
- Country: Sri Lanka
- Language: Sinhala

Paya Enna Hiru Se (Sinhala: පායා එන්න හිරු සේ) is a 2009 Sri Lankan Sinhalese action thriller film directed by Udayakantha Warnasuriya and produced by Dhammika Siriwardena for Evoke Films. It stars Ranjan Ramanayake in dual role with new coming actress Udari Warnakulasooriya in lead roles along with Ratnawali Kekunawala, Sriyantha Mendis and Bimal Jayakody. Music composed by veteran music director Rohana Weerasinghe. It is the 1125th Sri Lankan film in the Sinhalese cinema.

The film brought debut cinema acting of Udari Warnakulasuriya. The title of the film after a song written by Padmakumara Mettasena, sung by Amila Perera.

== Plot ==
Suren is a widower father of Himasha. Dinali is Himasha’s nersury teacher. Himasha’s mother had died long ago. Because of this, Himasha loves her teacher as her mother. Eventually Suren falls in love with Dinali and Dinali also agrees to marry him to relive Himasha’s pain. However, Suren’s mother is not very happy with Dinali as she is Suren’s second marriage and as Dinali is Himasha’s school teacher. One day Suren gets killed by some rogues. After that Dilani meets a man named Suraj who has Suren’s appearance. Then she comes to a deal with him. Suraj is a gangster. Suraj lives with the family. He acts according to the instructions given to him by Dinali. Himasha and Suren’s mother thinks that Suren has returned. Meanwhile his gang’s leader Harris doesn’t approve his behaviour. He wants Suraj to join the gang again and help him in robberies.

One day the gangsters kidnap Dinali and Himasha. In that moment Suren’s mother collapses. Suraj fights with Harris and kills him. After that he tells the other gangsters to lead good lives doing good jobs. Suraj gets ready to leave Dilani and Himesha but Himesha pleads him not to go. Then Suraj decides to live with them. At the end of the film, Dilani and Suraj live happily with Himasha.

== Cast ==
- Ranjan Ramanayake as Suren / Suraj
- Udari Warnakulasooriya as Dinali
- Anushi Warnasuriya as Himasha
- Sriyantha Mendis as Harris
- Bimal Jayakody as Suren's friend
- Ratnawali Kekunawala as Suren's mother
- Pubudu Chathuranga as Sudu Malli
- Nirosha Maithree as Suren's former wife
- Chanchala Warnasuriya Suren's friend's wife
- Lal Kumara
- Srimath Indrajith Liyanage as Henchman
- Banu Kodikara

== Soundtrack ==
No.	Title	Singer(s)	Length
1.	"Hagumbari"	Amila Perera, Iresha Otam
2.	"Paya Enna Hiruse"	Amila Perea, Amila Nadeeshani
3.	"Ranin Opalu"	Amila Perea, Uresha Ravihari
