= Rosa Wasanthe =

2001 film by Udayakantha Warnasuriya

Rosa Wasanthe රෝස වසන්තේ
- Directed by: Udayakantha Warnasuriya
- Written by: Udayakantha Warnasuriya
- Based on: "Parasathu Uyana"
- Produced by: Soma Edirisinghe; E.A.P Films
- Starring: Ranjan Ramanayake; Kanchana Mendis; Nisansala Jayatunga
- Cinematography: Jayanath Gunawardena
- Edited by: Stanley de Alwis
- Music by: Rohana Weerasinghe
- Distributed by: E.A.P Films
- Release date: 11 December 2001
- Country: Sri Lanka
- Language: Sinhala

Rosa Wasanthe (Sinhala: රෝස වසන්තේ) is a 2001 Sri Lankan Sinhalese romantic thriller film directed by Udayakantha Warnasuriya and produced by Soma Edirisinghe for EAP Films. It stars Ranjan Ramanayake, Kanchana Mendis, and debut actress Nisansala Jayatunga in lead roles along with Semini Iddamalgoda and Buddhika Jayaratne. The script was based on a story published in Sathuta magazine titled "Parasathu Uyana". The score was composed by Rohana Weerasinghe. It is the 971st Sri Lankan film in the Sinhalese cinema. It marks as the fifth directorial effort of Udayakantha and the fifteenth production of E.A.P Films.

== Plot ==
Hansamali is a young, village girl. She comes to Colombo for a job interview. She gets the job and stays with her childhood friend, Rejini. Rejini introduces Hansamali to her friend, Akila, who is a rugby player. Akila starts working at Hansamali's company. Eventually, Akila and Hansamali fall in love while Rejini has also a crush with Akila. While Rejini learns this, she leaves Hansamali. Akila and Hansamali get married and Rejini is married to her cousin, Gihan.

Hansamali gets a scholarship to Malaysia for three months and moves abroad. Akila lives in home alone. Rejini learns this and befriends with Akila. Eventually, this friendship turns to a relationship. Soon, Rejini gets pregnant with Akila's child. Akila is shocked and feels guilty for Hansamali. He demands Rejini to abort the child. While he leaving, he meets to Gihan and threatened by him.

Soon, Hansamali returns after finishing her course. Akila hides Rejini's truth from her. Akila and Rejini meet with an accident and Rejini lies that she had lost the child. Akila is relieved and lives happily with Hansamali. Some time later, Hansamali learns about Rejini's pregnancy truth from Gihan. She is shocked and moves to her village, leaving Akila alone again. Soon, Hansamali finds that she's also pregnant with Akila's child.

One day, Akila gets a call from hospital. When he went to there, he learns that Rejini died after the childbirth. The nurse informs him to Rejini was beaten by Gihan who is moved from country now which causes to Rejini's death. Akila decides to take care of his newborn daughter. He visits Hansamali with baby. Hansamali is shocked learning Rejini's death and accepts the baby. Thus, Akila and Hansamali reunite. The film ends with Akila and Hansamali live happily with their two daughters while Rejini's spirit watching them.

== Cast ==
- Ranjan Ramanayake as Akila Sannasgala
- Kanchana Mendis as Hansamali
- Nisansala Jayatunga as Rejini
- Semini Iddamalgoda as Mihiri
- Buddhika Jayaratne as Gihan
- Wijeratne Warakagoda as Hansamali's father
- Umali Thilakarathne as Hansamali's sister
- Dancers:
  - Namal Bandara
  - Pradeep Brettly
  - Kasun Buddhika
  - Thilini Chathurika
  - Nalin Gunaratne
  - Ayantha Mahesh
  - Samith Harshana Matharage
  - Namal Rathnapriya
  - Eesharu Rathnasiri
  - Dinushi Shashika

== Production ==
Filming took place in Diyatalawa, Colombo, Nuwara Eliya, Kurunegala, Kothmale, and Minipe.

Cinematography was handled by Jayanatha Gunawardena, editing by Stanley de Alwis. Samarasiri Kandanage was in charge of make-up, with Roshan Ravindra as assistant. Sarath Ranaweera was in charge of hair with Indika Udara Lanka as assistant. Costumes were designed by Buddhika Jayaratne, with wardrobe by Shanthi Warnakulasuriya.

=== Music ===
Music and songs composed by Dr. Rohana Weerasinghe. Three songs feature in the film, with lyrics written by Kularatne Ariyawansa, Bandara Ehaliyagoda, and Bandula Nanayakkarawasam. Gretion Ananda, Samitha Mudhunkotuwa, and Nirosha Virajini had already signed on to perform the songs before the film had a title. The songs were titled "La hiru sevane", performed by Mudhunkotuwa and Virajini; "Nil Nuwan Sandelle", performed by Ananda and Virajini; and "Thisara Vile", performed by Ananda and Mudhunkotuwa.

== Release ==
The film was released on 11 December 2011.

== Reception ==
Rosa Wasanthe was a "box office hit", achieving "record profits".
