= Udari Warnakulasooriya =

Sri Lankan Actress and model

- උදාරි වර්ණකුලසූරිය
- Born: Udari Chamika Warnakulasooriya; 22 March 1988 (age 38); Negambo, Sri Lanka
- Education: Ave Maria Convent Negombo
- Occupations: Actress; model
- Years active: 2009–present
- Spouse: Sujith Indeewara Wijeratne
- Children: 1
- Parent(s): Greshan Fernando; Chitra Pushpakanthi
- Awards: Popular Actress; Mrs Sri Lanka 2015
- Website: Official

Udari Chamika Warnakulasooriya (born 22 March 1988) is a Sri Lankan actress who appears in Sri Lankan films and television. She is best known for the roles in TV serials such as Bonda Meedum and Pini.

== Early life ==
Udari Warnakulasooriya was born on 22 March 1988 in Negambo. Her father is Greshan Fernando and mother is Chitra Pushpakanthi. She has one elder brother, Chamika Haritha. She is a former student of Ave Maria Convent Negombo. Udari was a member of both the Western and Eastern bands in school, and she was also part of the Western Folk Band. She actively participated in several sports at school and was a member of the school's netball team, cricket team, elle team, and volleyball team. After completing her schooling, she obtained a degree in child psychology from the American College of Higher Education.

She is married to Sujith Indeewara Wijeratne, who is a doctor, and the couple has one daughter and one son.

== Modeling career ==
In 2003, she achieved the Dance Talent Crown at the Contest Fiesta Beauty Competition, which marked a significant step in her modeling career. She later competed in the Miss Sri Lanka for Miss World 2007 pageant and emerged as a finalist, garnering several titles during the competition, including Miss Talent, Beautiful Legs, Miss Popular, and Miss Clearness Face.

In 2015, she competed in the Mrs. Sri Lanka for Mrs. Globe 2015 pageant and emerged as the winner. During that event, she also excelled in various categories, securing victories in Mrs. Talent, Beautiful Skin, Mrs. Elegance, and Mrs. Popular.

== Acting career ==
Before entering the field of drama, she gained experience by appearing in numerous television commercials, including notable ones for Holcim and Nestlé. Following this, she made appearances in music videos, starring in Daddy's "Borukari" and later featuring in Sanka Dineth's "Adare Oba Ai Hera Giye." Additionally, she hosted the musical program "Juke Box," which was broadcast on TV Derana. At the age of 21, she made her cinematic debut in Udayakantha Warnasuriya's film Paya Enna Hiru Se. In the film, she shared the screen with Ranjan Ramanayake.

Udari made her first television appearance through Chandika Senanayake's mega teledrama Bonda Meedum, where she portrayed the main protagonist,Sansala alongside Saranga Disasekara. The drama garnered immense popularity nationwide, leading to Udari's nomination as the most popular actress at various local television award ceremonies. During the COVID-19 pandemic, she managed to complete filming for eight films: V. Sivadasan's Deveni Yuddhaya, Bennett Ratnayake's Kavuruvat Dannē Næhæ, Sarath Weerasekara's Sri Siddha, Jackson Anthony's Ekagei Sokari and Devi Sambula, Jayantha Chandrasiri's Miduṇu Viśhvaya, Sanjeewa Pushpakumara's Aasu, Professor Sunil Ariyaratne's film Kshera Sāgaraya Kælambiṇa.

=== Selected television serials ===
- Adara Desak
- Ahas Maliga
- Alupata Dedunu
- Binara Malee
- Bonda Meedum
- Hiddalaya
- Kalu Araliya
- Mawa Mathakada
- Pini
- Sansararanya Asabada
- Sayuri
- Sihina Piyapath
- Situwara Puwatha
- Susumata Pawa Rahasin
- Wandana

== Filmography ==
Key
†	Denotes films that have not yet been released

Year	Film	Role	Ref.
2009	Paya Enna Hiru Se	Dinali	
2012	Sihinaya Dige Enna	Ridma	
2015	Gindari	Cameo role	
2016	Adaraneeya Kathawak	Piyavi Hansika	
2017	Paha Samath	Special appearance	
2017	Porisadaya	Heli Wedisinghe	
2018	Madhura Charika	Special appearance	
2018	Aladin Saha Puduma Pahana	Princess	
2020	Eka Gei Sokari	Sedera Menike	
2021	Kawuruth Danne Na	Jānu	
2023	Ksheera Sagaraya Kalabina	Purambhikawa	
2023	Deweni Yuddhaya	Maheshi	
2023	Midunu Vishwaya	Rajini Madirakshi	
2023	Aasu	Nelum	
2024	Sri Siddha	Vijayabahu's queen consort	
2025	Devi Kusumasana	Kusumasana Devi	
2026	The Wife	Nirmala	
TBA	Number 9 †		

== Awards ==
=== Sumathi Awards ===
Year	Nominee / work	Award	Result
2011	Bonda Meedum	Most Popular Actress	Won
2022	Sansaranya Asabada	Best Actress (2020)	Won

=== Derana Film Awards ===
Year	Nominee / work	Award	Result
2019	People's vote	Most Popular Actress	Won

=== Raigam Tele'es ===
Year	Nominee / work	Award	Result
2014	Adara Desak	Most Popular Actress Award	Won
2020	Sansaranya Asabada	Best Actress Award	Won
