= Sulanga Apa Ragena Yavi =

- Sinhala: සුළඟ අප රැගෙන යාවි
- Directed by: Nuwan Jayathilake
- Written by: Nuwan Jayathilake
- Produced by: Nawagaththegama Films
- Starring: Priyankara Rathnayake; Suranga Ranawaka; Sujeewa Priyalal
- Cinematography: Striner Macklain Adams
- Edited by: Saman Alvitigala
- Music by: Chitral Somapala
- Distributed by: CEL Theatres
- Release date: 2016
- Country: Sri Lanka
- Language: Sinhala

Sulanga Apa Ragena Yavi (Sinhala: සුළඟ අප රැගෙන යාවි) is a 2016 Sri Lankan Sinhala drama film directed by Nuwan Jayathilake and co-produced by director himself with Maya Nawagaththegama for Nawagaththegama Films. It stars Priyankara Rathnayake and Suranga Ranawaka in lead roles along with Sujeewa Priyalal and Iranganie Serasinghe. Music composed by Chitral Somapala. It is the 1326th Sri Lankan film in the Sinhala cinema.The film successfully passed 100 theatrical days.

== Plot ==
The film is a drama, following a young boy's journey to find his stolen white bull, who was taken for slaughter in the city. The film is emotional and calls attention to the hardships of impoverished, rural people in Sri Lanka. It also highlights the bond between rural inhabitants and their livestock.

== Cast ==
- Priyankara Rathnayake as Edward
- Suranga Ranawaka as Kumari
- Sujeewa Priyalal as Rasika
- Anjana Premarathna as Duminda
- Sampath Jayaweera as Ranji
- Iranganie Serasinghe as Granny
- Sanath Hennayaka as Nandapala
- Sisira Thadikara as Farmer
- Lanka Bandaranayake as Farmer's wife
- Wasantha Muhandiram as Podi Vijay
- Denushka Weerapperuma as Aunt
- Chamal Ranasinghe as Apple salesman
- Dinal Asanka as Kapuwa
- Wimal Kumara de Costa as Elder father
- Bandula Vithanage as Monk
- Semini Hennayaka as Nihansa
- Praween Katukithula as Vihanga
- Sudam Katukithula as Kasun
- Dayadeva Edirisinghe as Policeman

== Songs ==
The film has only one song sung by Himasha Manupriya.

No.	Title	Lyrics	Singer(s)	Length
1.	"Dura Ahasa Mawana Roo Rata"	Nuwan Jayathilaka	Himasha Manupriya

== Production ==
The film has been done on a tight budget. It was shot in around 15 days.

== Awards and Screening ==
The film had a special autumn screening with director Q&A session on October 16 at Munich in Germany. The film has won several awards at international film festivals.

- 49th WorldFest Houston International Film Festival 2016 - Remi Award
- 18th London Asian Film Festival 2016 - Screened
- Cinekid screening club in Netherlands - Competitive section
- Cinema Di Ringhiera in Italy - Screened
- Cinema De Mando in Rome - Screened
- Indian Film Festival in Melbourne - Screened
- European Children's Film Association - Sold in European film market
- Toronto World International Film Festival - Screened
- Held special shows in Munich in Germany, Verona, Brescia and Milano Italy, Sidney, Perth and Melbourne in Australia
