= Guerilla Marketing =

Guerilla Marketing ගරිල්ලා මාර්කටිං
- Directed by: Jayantha Chandrasiri
- Written by: Jayantha Chandrasiri
- Produced by: K.C.K Communications
- Starring: Yashoda Wimaladharma; Kamal Addararachchi; Sangeetha Weeraratne
- Cinematography: Ruwan Costa
- Edited by: Ravindra Guruge
- Music by: Premasiri Khemadasa
- Production company: Simasahita Euroshian
- Distributed by: CEL Theaters
- Release date: 13 April 2005
- Country: Sri Lanka
- Language: Sinhala

Guerilla Marketing (Sinhala: ගරිල්ලා මාර්කටිං) is a 2005 Sri Lankan Sinhala action thriller film directed by Jayantha Chandrasiri and produced by K.C.K Communications for Euroshian Consultancy. It stars Yashoda Wimaladharma, Kamal Addararachchi and Sangeetha Weeraratne in lead roles along with Jackson Anthony and Sriyantha Mendis. Music composed by Premasiri Khemadasa. It is the 1050th Sri Lankan film in the Sinhala cinema.

== Plot ==
Thisara runs an advertising agency and has had a relationship with his cousin Suramya. However, when she went away for her education, he married Rangi, a young woman from a wealthy family. When Suramya returned after completing her education, she joined Thisara's agency, even though she was qualified to work for a better firm. Suramya appears traditionally dressed but is well-talented, educated, and professional, while Rangi, who has a Western style, is neither qualified nor educated, despite her wealth.

A presidential election is approaching, featuring two main candidates: the current president (Sriyantha Mendis), and the opposition leader, Gregory Mahadikaram (Jackson Anthony). Thisara receives a propaganda contract from Gregory. As a key part of the propaganda campaign, he trains some people to spread false rumors about Gregory's good actions, which never actually occurred. He refers to this rumor-spreading as "Guerrilla Marketing." Ultimately, Gregory wins the election.

Thisara struggles with internal conflicts regarding Suramya. He is attracted to her appearance and style but feels bound by his marriage to Rangi. As a result, he becomes mentally ill and is admitted to a mental hospital. Later, Suramya reveals that although she could have joined a better firm, she chose to work at Thisara's agency to take revenge on him for abandoning her and marrying another woman. She succeeded by dressing and presenting herself in a way that appealed to his desires, causing him mental distress as he could not fulfill those desires with his wife.

In the final scene, a recovered Thisara is seen driving a vehicle with Rangi seated in the left seat, traditionally dressed as Suramya used to be.

== Cast ==
- Yashoda Wimaladharma as Suramya Mahakehelwala
- Kamal Addararachchi as Thisara Dissanayake
- Sangeetha Weeraratne as Rangi Dissanayake
- Jackson Anthony as Gregory Mahadikaram
- Sriyantha Mendis
- Buddhadasa Vithanarachchi
- Gamini Jayalth
- Priyankara Rathnayake
- G. Ranganatha
- Palitha Galappaththi
- Mali Jayaweerage

== Awards ==
=== Presidential Awards 2005 ===
- Jackson Anthony - Best Actor
- Premasiri Khemadasa - Best Musical score
- Ravindra Guruge - Best Editor

=== SIGNIS Salutation Awards 2007 ===
- Jayantha Chandrasiri - Best Director Silver Award
- Jackson Anthony - Best Actor Silver Award
- Ravindra Guruge - Best Creative Editor
- Premasiri Khemadasa - Best Creative Music Director
- Clifford Richard - Best Creative Singer
