= Malani Bulathsinhala =

Sri Lankan musician (1949–2001)

Malani Bulathsinhala මාලනී බුලත්සිංහල
- Born: 12 December 1949; Boralesgamuwa, Sri Lanka
- Died: 29 March 2001 (aged 51); Los Angeles, California, U.S.A.
- Education: Papiliyana Beacon School; Bhatkhande University
- Occupations: Singer, musician
- Spouse: H. M. Jayawardena (m. 1978)
- Children: 2, including Kasun Kalhara
- Parents: Wilson Bulathsinhala (father); P. K. Bulathsinhala (mother)
- Relatives: Sandhya Bulathsinhala (sister)
- Musical career
- Genres: Pop; soul; rhythm and blues; Indian classical music
- Instrument: Vocals
- Years active: 1959–2001
- Labels: HMV; Torana

Malani Bulathsinhala (12 December 1949 - 29 March 2001: Sinhala: මාලනී බුලත්සිංහල) was a Sri Lankan singer. She began her musical career at age 10 with the Sri Lanka Broadcasting Corporation, and was popular in the country throughout the late 20th century, until her sudden demise in 2001.

She is the wife of H. M. Jayawardena, and the mother of Kasun Kalhara, both prominent musicians themselves.

== Personal life ==
Bulathsinhala was born on 12 December 1949, in Boralesgamuwa, the oldest child of Wilson and P. K. Bulathsinhala. She had two siblings, a brother, Sireshan, and sister, Sandhya. She completed her education at the Papiliyana Beacon School for Girls. She also served as Assistant Director of Education in the western Sri Lankan province of Sri Jayawardenepura Kotte.

She married fellow musician Hearth Muidiyanselage Jayawardena on 30 December 1978, and was the mother of musician Kasun Kalhara. Her only daughter, Nirmani Chaya, died in 1991 at the age of three of dengue fever.

Her younger sister, Sandhya, is also a singer. On 27 March 2016, her sister staged a concert, "Sandamadala", at the Kularatne Hall of Ananda College, Colombo, to commemorate Bulathsinhala's singing career.

== Musical career ==
Bulathsinhala specialised in Indian classical and Oriental music. Bulathsinhala's first song to be aired on the radio was "Yala Yala Yala Yamu Saththu Balanna", a collaboration with Graeme Leonardos. Her first music teacher was Kamalini Perera. She joined the Lama Pitiya program at Sri Lanka Broadcasting Corporation (SLBC) as B. S. Malani. She later graduated from the State Song and Music College of Fine Arts before going to India to specialize in music at Bhatkhande Music Institute Deemed University. After returning to Sri Lanka, she became a school music teacher.

During this period, she sang "Sanda Madale Sita" while participating in the Prabodha Gee radio program. She was also involved with the songs "Thun Ruwane Saranai", "Pipena Malakata" and "Himi Sanaramara", and wrote several duets with other singers, including "Dam Patin La" with Gunadasa Kapuge.

== Death ==
Bulathsinhala had traveled to the United States by herself in March 2001 for a series of concerts in areas of the country with a large Sri Lankan diaspora. Her final performance was in Staten Island, a borough of New York City known for having the largest Sri Lankan community in the United States.

Bulathsinhala was staying at the residence of Sri Lankan consul Tissa Wijeratne in Los Angeles, California. While readying for her concert performance there, Bulathsinhala was found dead in the bathroom. It is believed that her death was caused by anaphylaxis, brought on by an allergic reaction from using a hair dye she was unfamiliar with. She was 51 years old.

A post-mortem examination conducted by the Los Angeles County Coroner's Office ruled out the possibility of foul play, as was speculated by the media in Sri Lanka at the time. Tissue and blood samples were taken and examined by forensic pathologist Dr. Louis Pena. Coroner Barbara Nelson stated that Bulathsinhala's body did not have any external injuries indicating any fall, assault, or signs of an electric shock.

A Buddhist funeral offering (pansakula ceremony) in commemoration of Bulathsinhala was organized by the staff of the Sri Lankan Consul Generals Office and presided over by Walpola Piyananda Thero. Her body was repatriated to Sri Lanka on the night of 1 April 2001. It arrived and was taken to her home in Mattegoda on 2 April for family viewing, before being placed at the Lionel Wendt Art Centre on 4 April for public respects. The funeral took place that same day at Borella General Cemetery in Colombo. Her gravestone features a photo of her, with a sculpture of a veena atop it.

== See also ==
- Nanda Malini
- Latha Walpola
- H. M. Jayawardena
