= Shades of Ash =

Shades of Ash Sudu Kalu Saha Alu
- Directed by: Sudath Mahaadivulwewa
- Written by: Sudath Mahaadivulwewa, Sarathchandra Gamlath
- Produced by: Cine Shilpa
- Starring: Sriyantha Mendis; Mahendra Perera; Dilhani Ekanayake
- Cinematography: Ruwan Costa
- Edited by: Elmo Haliday
- Music by: Premasiri Khemadasa
- Distributed by: Asian Film Center, Sri Lanka
- Release date: 28 July 2005
- Running time: 105 min
- Countries: Sri Lanka, Sweden
- Language: Sinhala (English Subtitle)

Sudu Kalu Saha Alu (Shades of Ash) (Sinhala: සුදු කළු සහ අළු) is a 2005 Sri Lankan Sinhala drama thriller film directed by Sudath Mahaadivulwewa and produced by Krishan Deheragoda for Cine Shilpa. It stars Dilhani Ekanayake, Sriyantha Mendis and Mahendra Perera in lead roles along with Jayalath Manoratne and Sanath Gunathilake. Music composed by Premasiri Khemadasa. It is the 1053rd Sri Lankan film in the Sinhala cinema.

The film has been filmed at a specially built village in a location 'Kalu Visa Pokuna' in Anuradhapura. It is the first Sri Lankan film made without a single main character in Sinhala cinema history. The film screened at 27th Goteborg Film Festival in Sweden on 29 January 2004.

== Plot ==
A convoy of trucks returns refugees to the “Kalu Visa Pokuna” village. The village had previously been ransacked by the extremists who had killed men, women, and children and buried them in a mass grave. The refugees coming in the trucks are being re-settled in their village. This re-settlement is a Government policy to restore the normal lives of the people ravished by the war.

The village lake has been poisoned by the extremists. It has already taken the lives of several well-meaning and innocent individuals. Therefore, the village residents were highly dependent on the water brought from the outside to the village by a water bowser on a regular basis.

To a village dominated by anxiety, poverty and mortal fear, two particular men arrive. One of them is a visitor while the other is a young man from the same village. The visitor is the new headmaster of the village school who has been transferred to this village due to political vengeance. His name is “Gunawardane” school master. The young villager is “Army Ajith”. He has deserted the army since he couldn't obtain leave to complete his honeymoon.

As “Army Ajith” returns home with many presents for his newly wed wife, Komala, she is with another man in her husband's room. At the same time, Gunawardane school master comes to a school with no roof and inhabited only by cows. As Army Ajith meets with an accident after his traumatic encounter with his newly wed, Pema, her lover runs naked across the village and covers his nudity with the red cloth of the village kovil. Looking at all this activity intently is a little child named “Ukkuva”, who had arrived just recently.

Ukkuva, a child who witnessed his parents’ death and having lived as a refugee, he has been thrown off a truck as he was taken from one camp to the other. He has thus become a refugee for the second time at “Kalu Visa Pokuna” village. A prisoner who has escaped from the jail hides in “Heen Eki’s” house. As she comes to her old home as part of the re-settlement programme, with a life-size glass mirror in her hands, she is startled as the prisoner runs out, smashing the mirror on the way. The prisoner then hides in the village temple, which has been completely deserted since its priests were killed during the attack by the extremists. He later camouflages himself with the dead priests robes and becomes a monk.

As “Koragramaya”, the crippled village headman and Pema engage in various bad dealings, Ukkuva comes under the protection of “Gam Bhara Attho”, whose cloth was used to cover Pema's nudity in a previous incident. “Gam Bhara Attho” is the caretaker of the village kovil and has been blinded by an attack on the village by the extremists. Komala, the woman who had an extra-marital affair with Pema was his daughter and Army Ajith was therefore his son-in-law. After the accident, Komala brings Army Ajith into the village as a mentally diseased patient. The shopkeeper's daughter, “Ungi”, develops an innocent and childish friendship with Ukkuva.

A woman called “NGO nona”, an agent from a Non-Governmental Organization, then comes to this village. She forms an alliance with the Gunawardane school master to do various business, being the only English-speaking individuals in the village. Gunawardane school master entices Ukkuva by showing him some food and molests him. Ukkuva's guardian, Komala, then gets into a brawl with Gunawardane school master. Having no other option to feed Ukkuva, her mentally ill husband and blind father, she gets on the only bus driven by “Assa Peetara” and going past the village to serve as a sexual worker in the nearby town.

Heen Eki's only kin, his sibling brother, is brought in a coffin covered with the national flag and escorted by the army. The alms-giving is paid for by Komala, from the money she earns as a sexual worker, and is given to the priest of the village, a prisoner in hiding. NGO nona gets total control of the village shop, the village bus, the Buddhist scriptures at the temple and Ungi, who performed the rights of attaining-of-age to the schedule of the arrival of the water bowser.

Ungi's father, “Pansal Godelle Mudalali”, the owner of the village shop who later disowns it at the hands of NGO nona, also loses his Kerosene cart to her and becomes her employee. At a later date, this same fate is experienced by “Assa Peetara”, the driver and owner of the only bus that connects the village with the town.

“Gam Bhara Attho” on overhearing of the nature of his daughter's profession from an argument between Komala and Assa Peetara, hangs himself on the rafters of the village kovil. Ukkuva who comes running to tell Komala about her father's death, accidentally steps on a land mine and becomes a cripple. In the aftermath of Gam Bhara Attho's funeral, Ukkuva practices walking using crutches with only one leg. As he does so, Pema comes fast on a bike along with a weapon on his shoulder and dressed as a village guard. He is being watched intently by Komala.

Pema comes over to Koragramaya who was in the temple grounds and an argument between them about Koragramaya sexually assaulting Pema's mother and then later even her sister, leads to Pema snatching the sickle from the priest's hand and murdering Koragramaya in the holy ground. Moments before Koragramaya's death, Pema grabs from his hands his appointment letter to the army. As the police come to inspect the death scene, the prisoner hiding in priest's clothes runs into the jungle to escape. His robe gets entangled in the twigs and he runs into the woods, naked. Komala contracts a sexual disease. Ungi is returned to the village by the NGO nona after having been sexually assaulted. As crippled Ukkuva and Ungi, who was forced into woman-hood, are sleeping side by side, Komala leaves her two children and disappears beneath the waves of the poisoned lake.

The rain is falling down very hard in the night. Near the mass grave site, Army Ajith re-iterates the verses his father-in-law, “Gam Bhara Attho”, used to say. As the darkness gives way to light, Assa Peethara lights incense sticks in front of the pictures of the gods in his bus. This same vehicle was once his, that is before NGO nona bought it and made him his employee. In the very first trip of the morning, Heen Eki, dressed elegantly, seems to be traveling to the town, as if to take the place of Komala. Assa Peethara looks back down the road. He sees Pema, well dressed for his first day at the new job and running towards the bus. Assa Peethara waits for his arrival. Pema sees Army Ajith and gets angry with having to see someone like him embarking on an important journey. In his anger he spits him on the face and gets on the bus.

Army Ajith who looks at the bus starts to laugh hysterically. Almost suddenly his laugh stops and he looks at the audience questioningly....... the scene fades out. A symbolic toy acrobat jumper that switches hands from time to time, is seen right throughout the film. .

== Cast ==
- Dilhani Ekanayake as Komala
- Sriyantha Mendis as Gambhara Attho
- Jayalath Manoratne as Koragramaya
- Mahendra Perera as Army Ajith
- Wasantha Kotuwella as Gunawardane
- Iranganie Serasinghe as NGO Nona
- Sanath Gunathilake as Assa Peter
- Tyrone Michael as Hamuduruwo
- Kumudu Nishantha as Pema
- Edward Gunawardena
- Sarath Kothalawala as Gramasewaka
- Sampath Jayaweera as Barricade soldier
- Dasun Madusanka as Ukkuwa
