= Duwana Muwan =

- Sinhala: දුවන මුවන්
- Directed by: Indra Weerasekara
- Written by: Mano Weerasekara
- Produced by: Mano Weerasekara
- Starring: Uddika Premarathna; Pabasara Diddeniya; Kaushalya Nirmana
- Cinematography: Ayeshman Hettiarachchi
- Edited by: Pravin Jayaratne
- Music by: Somapala Rathnayake; Gayathri Khemadasa
- Distributed by: MPI Theatres
- Release date: 27 November 2014
- Country: Sri Lanka
- Language: Sinhala

Duwana Muwan (A silent violence) (Sinhala: දුවන මුවන්) is a 2014 Sri Lankan Sinhala children's film directed by Indra Weerasekara and produced by Mano Weerasekara. It stars Uddika Premarathna and Pabasara Diddeniya in lead roles with Maurine Charuni and child actor Kaushalya Nirmana. Music co-composed by Somapala Rathnayake and Gayathri Khemadasa. It is the 1244th Sri Lankan film in the Sinhala cinema.

== Plot ==
Sama is Sinhala language teacher by profession in her village school. She is married to Amara who has done his tertiary education abroad. Their only son is Dhanushka. The school where Sama teaches is very poor in English. Although she is a Sinhala teacher she starts to teach the English course in new way. She uses new methods which are easy to remember for many children. In the meantime, having realized the ingratitude of some of the school teachers Amara plans to leave Sri Lanka with Sama and their son. She is reluctant to leave. This leads to a conflict within Sama's family.

== Cast ==
- Kaushalya Nirmana as Dhanushka (Dhanu)
- Uddika Premarathna as Amara
- Pabasara Diddeniya as Saama
- Nissanka Diddeniya as Saama's father
- Ferni Roshini as Miss Chandani
- Maureen Charuni
- Nilmini Kottegoda as Miss Duleeka

== Soundtrack ==
No.	Title	Singer(s)	Length
1.	"Sanda Kumari Obe Ras"	Amarasiri Peiris, Nelu Adhikari
2.	"Kalaya Deepaya Deshaya"	Dulanjali Wijesena, Lathis Lakshan Pathirana
3.	"Pawara Vikum Kala"	Nanda Malini
4.	"Igena Ganimu Ingreesi"	Dulanjali Wijesena, Lathis Lakshan Pathirana
