= Priyankara Rathnayake =

Sri Lankan actor

Priyankara Rathnayake ප්‍රියංකර රත්නායක
- Born: June 3, 1964 (age 62); Sri Lanka
- Education: University of Kelaniya
- Occupations: Actor, Dramatist, Lecturer
- Years active: 1988–present

Priyankara Rathnayake (born June 3, 1964 as Sinhala: ප්‍රියංකර රත්නායක) is an actor in Sri Lankan cinema, stage drama, and television. He also works as a senior lecturer for the Department of Drama, Cinema, and Television at the University of Kelaniya.

== Personal life ==
He started drama career under Somalatha Subasinghe's children and youth theater and state drama school. Then he joined Rajitha Dissanayake's drama troupe.

He entered to University of Kelaniya in 1989 and obtained the Bachelor of Arts Special Degree (Honours) in 1992. He completed Master of Arts Degree in Drama and Theatre from University of Sri Jayewardenepura in 2005. He is working as a lecturer and visiting lecturer for mass media, drama and theater as well as performing arts in University of Peradeniya, National School of Drama, Tower Hall Theatre Foundation and Sripalee campus of University of Colombo.

== Acting career ==
Rathnayake is credited for introducing famous plays by Sophocles to the Sri Lankan theater with the titles Oedipus and Ada Vage Davasaka Antigone. He also directed Aristophanes' play Lysistrata in 2015 as Visekariyo. In 2016, he directed William Shakespeare's A Midsummer Night's Dream with the title Premawantha Kumarayo.

In 2016, a four-day theater festival was held at the Lionel Wendt Theatre in Colombo from June 7 to 10 daily at 7 pm.

=== Notable works ===
- Ada Vage Davasaka Antigone
- Asinamali
- Bakamuna Weedi Basi
- Oedipus
- Poth Gullee
- Premawantha Kumarayo
- Sihina Horu Aran
- Visekariyo

=== Selected television serials ===
- Abhisamaya
- Ahanna Kenek Na
- Charithayaka Paata Denna
- Dhawala Yamaya
- Diya Ginisilu
- Giri Kula
- Kadadora
- Maheshika
- Manikkawatha
- Sakarma
- Satya
- Sulangata Enna Kiyanna
- Vishwanthari

== Author work ==
He wrote several books related to drama and media. One of them is Natya Vicharaya.

== Filmography ==
Rathnayake started his film career with Thunweni Aha back in 1996, directed by Anura Chandrasiri. His most popular cinema acting came through films Irasma, Bandhanaya and Dedunu Akase.

Key
†	Denotes films that have not yet been released

Year	Film	Role	Ref.
1996	Thunweni Aha	Vimukthi	
2000	Rajya Sevaya Pinisai	Janaka shooter	
2003	Irasma	Tharintha Wijesundera	
2005	Guerilla Marketing		
2008	Prabhakaran	Piyasoma	
2008	Aba	Yakchanda	
2017	Bandhanaya	Ariyapala	
2017	Dedunu Akase	Dance teacher	
2019	Sulanga Apa Ragena Yavi	Edward	
2022	Ashawari		
2022	Hithumathe Jeewithe	IP Dasanayake	
2023	Kandak Sema		
2024	Mandara	Police officer	
TBA	Gunananda Himi Migettuwatte †		

== Awards and accolades ==
He has won several awards at the local stage drama festivals and television festivals.

=== Presidential Awards ===
Year	Nominee / work	Award	Result
1999	Dorakada Marawa	Best Screenplay	Won

=== Sumathi Awards ===
Year	Nominee / work	Award	Result
2001	Abhisamaya	Merit Award	Won

=== Raigam Tele'es ===
Year	Nominee / work	Award	Result
2012	Sulangata Enna Kiyanna; Kadadora	Merit Award	Won
