= Maharaja Gemunu =

Maharaja Gemunu (2015)
- Directed by: Jayantha Chandrasiri
- Written by: Jayantha Chandrasiri
- Produced by: Sipvin Films
- Starring: Uddika Premarathna; Jackson Anthony; Sriyantha Mendis
- Cinematography: Ruwan Costa
- Edited by: Ravindra Guruge
- Music by: Nadeeka Guruge
- Distributed by: EAP Films
- Release date: January 23, 2015
- Running time: 150 minutes
- Country: Sri Lanka
- Language: Sinhala
- Budget: Rs 110 million

Maharaja Gemunu (King Gemunu) (Sinhala: මහරජ ගැමුණු) is a 2015 Sri Lankan Sinhala epic film directed by Jayantha Chandrasiri and produced by Gunapala Rathnasekara for Sipvin Films. It stars Uddika Premarathna and Jackson Anthony in lead roles along with Sriyantha Mendis and Yashoda Wimaladharma. Its music was composed by Nadeeka Guruge. It is the 1221st Sri Lankan film in the Sinhala cinema.

The movie is based on the odyssey of King Gemunu (ruler of Sri Lanka 161–137 BC) who is renowned for defeating and overthrowing King Elara, the usurping Tamil prince from the Chola Kingdom, who had invaded the Kingdom of Rajarata in 205 BC.

== Synopsis ==
The film begins with Queen Vihara Maha Devi, the mother of king Dutugemunu, arriving at a Buddhist temple to pay her respects to Sumana Samanera, a young priest who is gravely ill. She speaks about the selfless nature of Sumana samanera, and invites the priest to be reborn as her son. After this, she speaks to the head priest of the temple about the news the palace heard through a team of elite fighters devoted to king Kavantissa (proficient in the technique “angampora”). The news states that King Elara plans to cut down the sacred Jaya Siri Maha Bodhi. During this conversation, Sumana samanera is shown to pass away, and Vihara Maha Devi sees a vision of the young priest running to her. She places a hand on her stomach, indicating that the young priest has indeed been reborn as her growing child. The scene shifts to one at the Jaya Sri Maha bodhi, where the troops of king Elara are set to cut down the sacred bodhi. They never get the chance; they are caught by the elite Angampora team, and killed so secretively that no evidence of the fight is found. Even their bodies seem to have disappeared. King Elara hears of this, and sends his commander to annihilate the Angampora team, the leader of which happens to be the father of the boy who would grow to become “Nandimithra”, one of the greatest generals of King Dutugemunu (one of the “ten giants”, commonly known as “dasa maha yodha”)

Years later, Nandimithra, now a seasoned warrior, speaks to Prince Gamini and his younger brother Prince Tissa, about how his current situation came to be. He is now a leader of a Angampora team himself, and has been guarding the Jaya Sri Maha Bodhi for years, efficiently defeating and killing whoever came to harm the sacred Bodhi. Gamini speaks of how Buddhism is a religion that does not condone any form of killing, even enemies. Nandimithra replies by saying he is willing to give up his own chance at attaining Nirvana in order to protect Buddhism in the country so that others may attain it in peace. Amazed by these words, Gamini fondly speaks of how his own mother taught him the same way of thinking.

Murdering of innocent civilians under the claim that they are Prince Gamini’s spies, has been going on for a long time, by King Elara. Details of these killings reach the palace. They anger and sadden Gamini, and he expresses frustration at his father, King Kavantissa for remaining passive and not initiating a war.

Kavantissa, speaks to his council about all he learnt about King Elara. King Elara is a former soldier and spy under King Kharawela of Kalinga, who rules the Southern Kingdoms of India during the second century BC. Elara arrives at Lankadveepa, in the guise of an overseas naval chief, in order to threaten the prosperity of the Kingdom. Elara is victorious against the Kingdom of Rajarata, having killed King Asela. However, he is not satisfied with his victory because the kingdom of Ruhuna continues to be independent and he is haunted by a prophecy inscribed by King Devanampiyatissa.

Bhattara, an advisor to Elara, found the inscribed prophecy which alluded to a King named Gamani Abhaya (Dutu Gemunu) who would later secure the Kingdom of Rajarata and build a massive pagoda (dageba) at its center. Bhattara and Elara scheme against the prophecy.

King Gamani Abhaya deploys strategies to overcome the tactics of Elara and vanquish him. However, because of his spiritual ideology, he does not allow his people to forget the humanity that was rooted within the enemy. This act universalizes King Gamani's profound humanity.

== Cast ==
- Uddika Premarathna as King Dutugemunu
- Jackson Anthony as King Elara
- Sriyantha Mendis as King Kavan Tissa
- Kusum Renu as Queen Viharamahadevi
  - Tharuka Wanniarachchi as Young Queen Viharamahadevi
- Saranga Disasekara as Saddha Tissa
- Yashoda Wimaladharma as Queen Dharatri (Elara's wife)
- Buddhadasa Vithanarachchi as Monk Mahasiva
- Sandun Bandara as Bhattara
- Ajith Weerasinghe as Nandimithra
- Arjuna Kamalanath as Suranimala
- Anura Dharamasiriwardana as Welusumana
- Dimuthu Chinthaka as Maha Gamarala
- Jagath Manuwarna as Village man
- Umali Thilakarathne as Elara's daughter
- Damitha Abeyratne as Rohini
- Buddhini Purnima as Kathee
- Lucky Dias as Minister Mahananda
- Rebeka Nirmali as Maha Gamarala's wife
- Meena Kumari as Dancer
- Randiv Ranga Jayawardena as Deeghabaya
- Uditha Nishantha as Nandi
- Muditha Wijesundera as Tissa Senevi
- Hemantha Randunu as Panimuththa Senevi
- Maithree Peramuna as Ghotagaththa Tissa
- Anuruddha Chamila as Gotaimbara
- Lahiru Prasanna as Pussadeva
- Don Vipularatne as Kanchadeva
- Mahesh Premathilake as Therapuththabhya
- Asitha Nuwan as Bharana
- Ajith Silva as Labiya Wasabha
- Jagath Jayawardene as Maha Sona

== Music ==
The music for Maharaja Gemunu was composed by Nadeeka Guruge, with lyrics written by Jayantha Chandrasiri and Rev. Pallegama Hemarathana Thero.

No.	Title	Music	Singer(s)	Length
1.	"Sanda Payanne" (title song)	Nadeeka Guruge	Nadeeka Guruge and the crew	5.27
2.	"Sanda Mandala Vee"		Nirosha Virajini	2.19
3.	"Aranyani Devduwa Avidin"		Chandrika Siriwandhana, Dilika Abesekara	6.01

== Release and reception ==
The film premiered on 23 January 2015 in EAP Holdings cinema halls. Released on 23 January 2015, the film was highly acclaimed by critics and fans alike, who considered it to be a landmark in Sinhala film-making and an achievement in the epic film genre. The film earned 3000 Lakhs of Sri Lankan rupees until December 2017.

=== Awards and nominations ===
Sarasaviya Film Awards 2016

- Best Movie
- Most Popular Movie of the Year
- Best Actor in a Leading Role (Male) – Jackson Anthony as King Elara
- Best Cinematography – Ruwan Kostha
- Best Editing – Raveendra Guruge
- Best Music Direction – Nadeeka Guruge
- Best Art Direction – Rohan Samaradiwakara and Aruna Priyantha Dharmapala
- Best Playback Singer (Female) – Nirosha Virajini for the song "Sanda Mandala Vee"
- Best Makeup – Jayantha Ranawaka
- Best Sound Design – Priyantha Kaluarachchi
- Best Lyricist – Ven. Pallegama Hemarathana for the song "Sanda Mandala Vee"

Hiru Golden Film Awards 2016

- Most Popular Movie
- Best Actor in a Supporting Role (Female) – Kusum Renu as Queen Viharamahadevi
- Best Playback Singer (Female) – Nirosha Virajini for the song "Sanda Mandala Vee"
- Best Lyricist – Ven. Pallegama Hemarathana for the song "Sanda Mandala Vee"
- Special Jury Award – Jackson Anthony as King Elara

== See also ==
- List of Asian historical drama films
