= Sudath Mahaadivulwewa =

Sri Lankan film director

- Born: Sudath Malala Bandara Diwakara Mahaadivulwewa; 17 January 1965; Colombo, Sri Lanka
- Other name: Divula
- Education: Dharmaraja College
- Occupations: Film director, script writing, production designing, advertising, journalism, research, evaluation and monitoring, mass communication, training and awareness
- Website: filmdivula.com

Sudath Mahaadivulwewa is a Sri Lankan film director. He is best known for his works in various feature films, documentaries, social awareness campaigns, and theatre work in Sri Lanka.

== Advertising ==
Mahaadivulwewa started his career as a creative copywriter in an advertising agency. He then moved into production side of advertising as creative director. At the age of 21 he began his first large-scale creative venture in television through a Telefilm series, thus becoming the "Youngest Director in Sri Lanka". During this time he competed for equal viewership with Sri Lankan films such as Dr. Lester James Peries' Giraya, and Dharmasena Pathiraja's Kadulla.

== Documentary and social awareness campaign ==
Mahaadivulwewa started his film and documentary direction touching on socio-political issues. In 1989 the 'Sri Lanka National Youth Council Services' awarded him the "Best Film Script" and "Best Documentary Script" awards. He has also received various other awards including the National Youth Council Services award, Sudath has been awarded the State Tele film & Documentary award, OCIC International award and Presidential awards.

== Filmography ==
=== Tele films ===
- Dawala Rathriya (1990)
- Manukakapura – Thotiya (1993)
- Manukakapura – Diyadabaraya (1993)
- Manukakapura – Vijayothratha (1993)
- Dande Lu Gini (1994)
- Vanaspathi (1995)
- Nikmantota (2000)

=== Documentary ===
- Sammatayata Erehi Vu Minisek (1988)
- Agnadayakayage Akkramanaya (1990)
- Vilata Horen Pipuna Malak (1991)
- Sathveni Sendewe Geethaya (1992)
- Sandagiri Pawwaka Watha (1992)
- Song of the Seventh Evening (1995)
- Corridors of Wisdom (2001)
- Diya Pavadayak-Bere – The Water Carpet (2004)
- Sudurlaba Diya Dehaya – The Water Ever So Shine (2006)
- Conquer the Darkness (2006)
- Diyamal Warshawaka Asiriya (2007)
- Asammatha Yathrikaya – Fr. Porutota (2007)
- Dakunulaka Sagara Saluwa (2007)
- Sthree Plus (+) (2008)

=== Feature film ===
- Shades of Ash (Sudu Kalu Saha Alu) (2004)
- The Little Monk (Podi Hamuduruwo/Marananussathi), script writer
- My Red Comrade (2024)

=== Social awareness campaign ===
- Presidential Task Force (PTF) (2001)
- You the Jury (2002)
- Development Lottery Request (2003)
- Life Under the Sun (2007)

== Awards ==
- Youth Award (1989) – Best Feature Film Script, Best Documentary Script (National Youth Council, Government of Sri Lanka)
- UNDA International Certificate of Merit (1991) – Effective Performance in Media (Office Catholic International Du Cinema)
- Best Amateur Film Critic (1992) – Jayvilal Vilegoda Memorial Award, Sri Lanka
- SLIM Award (1993) – Best TV Commercial of the year (Sri Lanka Institute of Marketing)
- Best Director (Documentary Films) (1995) – (Office Catholic International Du Cinema)
- Best Director (Tele Films) (1996) – (Office Catholic International Du Cinema)
- Dharmaraja Pranama (1997) – Contribution and Achievement for National Recognition of Media
- SLIM Award (Gold) (2003) – Best TV Commercial of the year (Sri Lanka Institute of Marketing)
- SLIM Award (Gold) (2003) – Best Corporate Image-TV Advertising (Sri Lanka Institute of Marketing)
- SLIM Award (Gold) (2003) – Best Production House (Sri Lanka Institute of Marketing)
- SLIM Award (Silver) (2003) – Best Corporate Image-TV Advertising (Production House) (Sri Lanka Institute of Marketing)
- SUMATHI Award (2003) – Best Corporate Image-TV Advertising (Sumathi Publication Limited)
- Best Social Responsibility Campaign (2004) – State Documentary and Tele-drama Festival (Ministry of Cultural Affairs, Sri Lanka)
- Best Social Responsibility Campaign (2005) – State Documentary and Tele-drama Festival (Ministry of Cultural Affairs, Sri Lanka)
- Best Director/Production (Tele Films) (2005) – State Documentary and Tele-drama Festival (Ministry of Cultural Affairs, Sri Lanka)
- Best Documentary – (2008) – State Documentary and Tele-drama Festival, Ministry of Cultural Affairs, Sri Lanka
- Best Social Awareness Campaign – (2008) – State Documentary and Tele-drama Festival, Ministry of Cultural Affairs, Sri Lanka
