= Amarasiri Peiris =

Sri Lankan singer (born 1946)

Amarasiri Peiris අමරසිරි පීරිස්
- Born: Senadheerage Amarasiri Peiris; 21 July 1946 (age 79); Boralesgamuwa, Sri Lanka
- Education: Boralesgamuwa Ananda Vidyalaya; Buwanekaba Vidyalaya
- Alma mater: Heywood Institute of Art
- Occupations: Violinist, solo (music)-singer
- Spouse: Nanda Koralage (m. 1972)
- Children: 5
- Parents: Albert Peiris (father); M.K. Asilin (mother)
- Musical career
- Genres: Pop; soul; rhythm and blues; Indian classical music
- Instruments: Vocals, Violin
- Years active: 1964–present
- Labels: Nilwala; Torana; Ransilu

Senadheerage Amarasiri Peiris (Sinhala:අමරසිරි පීරිස්: born 21 July 1946) is a Sri Lankan singer. One of the most honored singers of Sri Lanka, Peiris is a well known violinist and a vocalist.

== Personal life ==
He was born on 21 July 1946 in Boralesgamuwa as the eldest of the family. His father Albert Peiris was a classical artiste at Radio Ceylon popular in 1940s. Albert was the first disciple of the Master musician H.W. Rupasinghe. His mother M.K. Asilin was born in Meddewatta, Matara was a housewife. He has three younger sisters – Irene, Shriyalatha and Somalatha. As a child, he dreamed of becoming a train driver due to the influence of his uncle Piyasoma Nanayakkara. He completed primary education from Boralesgamuwa Ananda Vidyalaya and later attended to Buwanekaba Vidyalaya, Maharagama and studied music in Advanced Level class. Later in 1962, he attended to Heywood Institute of Art.

He is married to Nanda Koralage, a student who came to the Heywood to play Ezraj. The couple has one son, Madhawa and four daughters – Janaki, Anuradha, Nadeera and Subashini. Madhava is a singer as well as a talented guitarist. He lives in Italy. Daughter Janaki is an Aesthetic Instructor at Devi Balika Vidyalaya. Anuradha is a dancer. She lives in Australia. Nadeera is the Milagiriya Branch Manager of Bank of Ceylon.

== Career ==
Since child age, he used to accompany with father to Radio Ceylon to watch recordings, violin solos and other musicals. After graduated from Heywood, he joined SLBC as an A-grade violinist. Later he became a music conductor, a music controller at SLBC. He became the Director, Music at SLBC and retired after that. He studied violin under Douglas Ferdinands. In 1967 he joined the orchestra of Radio Ceylon.

At SLBC, he sang his first song, Budu Sihila Galalaa, a Bhakthi Gee composed by Sena Weerasekera. Since his life at Heywood, Peries had a close relationship with maestro Premasiri Khemadasa. Khemadasa invited him to join with Sangeetha Manjariya at Maradana, where Peries participated as a violinist for a cassette recording, Pahan Tharuwa. Later, Khemadasa invited him to sing Landune composed by the late Ranbanda Seneviratne. The song got enormous popularity which made the milestone of Peries' singing career.

Then, he got the opportunity to work as a playback singer for many films including Siri Medura, where he won his first Sarasavi Award for the song Minisa Marana Thunak Ethi. Peries became a permanent member of Khemadasa’s orchestras and met several prominent musicians Dr. Eardley Fonseka, Harvey Deutrom and Mrs. Prince. During this period, he met popular American artiste Roscoe Williams. He also made playback singing for the films Guru Gedera, Awaragira, Kawuluwa and Samanala Sandhawaniya and won several awards.

Peries sang many popular songs such as Hanthanata Payana Sanda, Oba Apple Malak Wage, Mage Punchi Rosa Male, Ape Ahinsaka Adare and Sanduda Awadiyen. In 2011, he launched a CD titled Ganga Gala Yaa Den.

On 18 May 2014, he performed a solo concert Hanthnata Payana Sanda held at Musaeus College Auditorium, Colombo 7. On 11 February 2017, he performed a concert Unmada Sanda at Swarnapali Balika Vidyalaya, Anuradhapura.

In 2024, Peiris sang a new song 'Ape podi hamuduruwo,' written by Bandara Eheliyagoda and composed by Rohana Weerasinghe, following the passing of Most Venerable Galboda Gnanissara Thero, chief incumbent monk of Gangaramaya Temple.

== See also ==
- W.D. Amaradeva
- Victor Rathnayake
