= Ashu Marasinghe =

Sri Lankan politician and academic

- ආශු මාරසිංහ

Personal details
- Born: May 25, 1971 (age 54)
- Party: United National Party
- Children: 3
- Education: Ananda College, Colombo 10 and Nalanda (Boys) College, Minuwangoda
- Alma mater: University of Aizu, Japan and University of Colombo, Sri Lanka
- Occupation: Chairman/CEO - GSDC and GSA
- Profession: Professor

Chandrajith Ashuboda "Ashu" Marasinghe (born 25 May 1971) is a Sri Lankan politician, professor and academic. He served as an advisor to Sri Lankan president Ranil Wickremesinghe and also served as a former member of parliament of Sri Lanka. He was a national list member of the Parliament of Sri Lanka proposed by United National Front following the 2015 Sri Lankan parliamentary election and subsequently served in the 15th Parliament of Sri Lanka as an MP.

Marasinghe was educated at Nalanda Central College and Ananda College, before attending the University of Colombo, where he earned a B.Sc. in physics and mathematics in 1997. He later studied computer science and engineering at the University of Aizu, Japan, where he received his M.Sc. (2001) and PhD. (2004). He has taught at the International University of Japan and was formerly an associate professor at Nagaoka University of Technology.

In December 2022, he resigned from his position as Presidential Advisor on Parliamentary Affairs due to allegations by a former girlfriend and by politician Hirunika Premachandra that he had sexually abused a pet dog. Marasinghe made a complaint at the Criminal Investigation Department, claiming that the allegations were baseless and that the video was doctored. He was re-appointed in the same post in February 2023.
