= Agnidahaya =

Agnidahaya අග්නිදාහය
- Directed by: Jayantha Chandrasiri
- Written by: Jayantha Chandrasiri
- Produced by: Jayantha Chandrasiri
- Starring: Jackson Anthony; Yashoda Wimaladharma; Kamal Addararachchi
- Cinematography: Ruwan Costa
- Edited by: Ravindra Guruge
- Music by: Premasiri Khemadasa
- Production companies: Prasad Color Lab, Madras
- Distributed by: CEL Theatres
- Release date: 13 December 2002
- Country: Sri Lanka
- Language: Sinhala

Agnidahaya (Fire and Water; Sinhala: අග්නිදාහය) is a 2002 Sri Lankan Sinhala film directed and produced by Jayantha Chandrasiri for Soyanno Films. It stars Jackson Anthony and Yashoda Wimaladharma in lead roles along with Kamal Addararachchi and Sanath Gunathilake Mike Fernando. Music composed by Premasiri Khemadasa. It is the 996th Sri Lankan film in the Sinhala cinema.

The film won seven golden awards and four silver awards at the Signis International Film Festival 2003.

== Cast ==
- Jackson Anthony as Punchi Rala
- Yashoda Wimaladharma as Kiri Menike
- Kamal Addararachchi as Sobana
- Sanath Gunathilake as Ambanwala Rala
- Buddhadasa Vithanarachchi as Herath
- Bandula Vithanage
- Raja Ganeshan
- Dayaratne Siriwardena
- Mali Jayaweerage
- Dimuthu Chinthaka
- Raja Ganeshan
- Jayani Senanayake
- Mike Fernando
