= Midunu Vishwaya =

2023 Sri Lankan film directed by Jayantha Chandrasiri

- මිදුණු විශ්වය
- Directed by: Jayantha Chandrasiri
- Written by: Jayantha Chandrasiri
- Screenplay by: Jayantha Chandrasiri
- Story by: Jayantha Chandrasiri
- Produced by: Ruwan Jayasingha
- Starring: Udari Warnakulasooriya; Uddika Premarathna; Buddhika Jayarathna; Chulakshi Ranathunga
- Cinematography: Pravin Jayaratne
- Edited by: Pravin Jayaratne
- Music by: Navarathna Gamage
- Production company: Ruoo Cinema Creation House
- Distributed by: LFD
- Release date: June 22, 2023 (Sri Lanka)
- Country: Sri Lanka
- Language: Sinhalese
- Budget: LKR 40 million (estimated)

Midunu Vishwaya (Sinhala: මිදුණු විශ්වය), also known as Frozen Cosmos, is a 2023 Romantic film directed by Jayantha Chandrasiri and produced by Ruwan Jayasinghe. The film starring, Uddika Premarathna, Udari Warnakulasooriya in lead roles, where Buddhika Jayarathna, Chulakshi Ranathunga and Sriyantha Mendis made supportive roles.

Midunu Vishwaya first showcased at some film festivals and had a short run in theatres. The movie officially launched in June 22, 2023. This movie is about love and connection that go beyond time.

== Plot ==
Set in the backdrop of Midunu Vishwaya (Frozen Cosmos), the movie follows the journey of Warenya and Rajini, two souls whose paths intersect in the most unexpected way. Warenya, an expert in Western acting techniques and psychoanalysis, meets the extraordinary student Sumadya. What sets Sumadya apart is her unique ability to enter a deep hypnotic trance, transcending space and time during Warenya's mental exercises. Through this trance, the remarkable connection between the past and present is established.

During one of these hypnotic sessions, Sumadya becomes a conduit for Rajini, an actress from the 1960s. This link allows Rajini to communicate with Warenya, residing in the year 2020. Rajini uses this opportunity to learn the art of acting from Warenya, leading to a connection that transcends time.

As Rajini finds professional growth through this unique connection, she also yearns for intimacy and love. Her solace lies in the bond she shares with Warenya, a connection that flourishes across temporal boundaries. However, their love is contingent upon Sumadya maintaining her role as a conduit, and this revelation adds a layer of complexity to their relationship.

Through a profound realization, Warenya and Rajini recognize that their true adversary isn't destiny itself, but the inexorable force of time. As their affection deepens and challenges arise, they come to terms with the separate lives they must lead in their respective eras. This acceptance leads them to a bittersweet decision, as they embrace time's limitations on their connection.

== Cast ==
- Uddika Premarathna as Warenya
- Udari Warnakulasooriya as Rajini Madirakshi
- Buddhika Jayarathna as Dunken
- Chulakshi Ranathunga as Danny - Sumadya
- Sriyantha Mendis as Dr. Mahadewa Danthanarayana
- Kusum Renu as Director
- Damitha Abeyratne as Dr. Mahadewa's wife
- Wasantha Wittachchi

== Soundtrack ==
| No. | Title | Lyrics | Singer(s) | Length |
|---|---|---|---|---|
| 1. | "Daiwaya Nowe (දෛවය නොවේ)" | Jayantha Chandrasiri | Leslie Thomas | 04:58 |
| 2. | "Diya Binduwa (දිය බිඳුව)" | Madhumani Hapuarachchi | Kushani Sandarekha | 05:50 |
| 3. | "Mulu Saagarayama ( මුළු සාගරයම වාගේ )" | Jayantha Chandrasiri | Kushani Sandarekha | 02:41 |

== Reception ==
The film received positive reviews.
