= Samanala Sandhawaniya =

2013 Sri Lankan film directed by Jayantha Chandrasiri

Samanala Sandhwaniya
- Sinhala: සමනල සංධ්වනිය
- Directed by: Jayantha Chandrasiri
- Written by: Jayantha Chandrasiri
- Produced by: Palitha Gunawardane; Ruwan Jayasingha
- Starring: Yashoda Wimaladharma; Uddika Premarathna; Pubudu Chathuranga
- Cinematography: Ruwan Costa
- Edited by: Ravindra Guruge
- Music by: Darshana Ruwan Dissanayake
- Release date: October 4, 2013 (Sri Lanka)
- Country: Sri Lanka
- Language: Sinhalese
- Budget: LKR 40 million (estimated)

Samanala Sandhwaniya (Sinhala: සමනල සංධ්වනිය), also known as Butterfly Symphony, is a 2013 musical romantic drama film directed by Jayantha Chandrasiri and starring Yashoda Wimaladharma, Uddika Premarathna, Pubudu Chathuranga, Wilson Gunaratne, Soorya Dayaruwan, Buddhadasa Vithanarachchi, Roger Seneviratne and Chathurika Peiris.

It was released on 4 October 2013 on EAP theaters. The film successfully completed 100 days in theatres.

== Cast ==
- Yashoda Wimaladharma as Punya Dissanayake
- Uddika Premarathna as Vadisha Wikramanayaka
  - Soorya Dayaruwan as Young Vadisha Wicramanayaka
- Pubudu Chathuranga as Vadisha's elder brother
- Wilson Gunaratne as Danny - Vadisha's Manager
- Buddhadasa Vithanarachchi as Vadisha's father
- Roger Seneviratne as Revatha Dissanayake
- Chathurika Peiris as Vadisha's wife
- Damitha Abeyratne as Punya's roommate
- Roshan Pilapitiya
- Rebeka Nirmali as Vadisha's sister-in-law

== Soundtrack ==
No.	Title	Singer(s)	Length
1.	"Gagana Sarannata Giya"	Indika Ruwan (Rooney)	03:58
2.	"Iki Gasa Hadana"	Amarasiri Peiris	04:13
3.	"Mage Sihina Madure"	Shammika Amani	04:11
