= Jayantha Chandrasiri =

Sri Lankan filmmaker

Jayantha Chandrasiri ජයන්ත චන්ද්‍රසිරි
- Born: Jayantha Chandrasiri; June 1959 (age 67); Colombo, Sri Lanka
- Occupations: Actor, director, producer, screen writer
- Years active: 1978–present
- Spouse: Madhumani Hapuarachchi
- Children: 3
- Awards: Kala Keerthi

Kala Keerthi Jayantha Chandrasiri (ජයන්ත චන්ද්‍රසිරි; born 1959) is a Sri Lankan journalist, screenplay writer, television director, and filmmaker in Sri Lankan cinema. Chandrasiri's film Agnidahaya won seven golden awards and four silver awards at the Signis International Film Festival 2003. His two teledramas Dandubasnamanaya and Akala Sandhya are rated as two of Seven Iconic Teledramas In Sri Lanka's Television History.

== Career ==
Chandrasiri started his acting career in 1978 under the guidance of German dramatist Dr. Norbet J. Mayer. He completed extensive study on theater by earning scholarships to Norway, Sweden, Germany and the USA. In 1979 he worked as the playwright for the play Saraswathi. Armed with the knowledge gained through these scholarships, he returned home and began directing with stage drama Ath, which led to State Drama Award winners Mora and Oththukaraya. In 2016 he resigned from the post of executive editor of the Divaina newspaper due to political disputes.

He has acted in two films, Sagarayak Meda and Maatha. His maiden stage drama direction came through Hankithi Daha Thuna. His maiden television drama direction came through super hit Weda Hamine. His maiden cinematic direction was Agnidahaya.

== Filmography ==
His first film direction came through Agnidahaya in 2002. His most notable films include Guerrilla Marketing and Samanala Sandhawaniya.

Year	Film	Ref.
2002	Agnidahaya	
2005	Guerilla Marketing	
2013	Samanala Sandhawaniya	
2015	Maharaja Gemunu	
2018	Gharasarapa	
2023	Midunu Vishwaya	
2025	Devi Kusumasana	
TBD	Samaharu Saha Samagama	

== Television ==
His first television serial is Weda Hamine, which later became a cult classic in Sri Lankan television drama history. His most notable television direction came through Dandubasnamanaya. His television serial, Akala Sandya is credited as the first ever Sri Lankan teledrama to depict the concept of time travel.

- Akala Sandya
- Dandubasnamanaya
- Hathara Denek Senpathiyo
- Nannaththara
- Rajina
- Weda Hamine
- Wes Muhuna

== Accolades ==
- Sumathi Best Teledrama Director Award 1995 - Dandubasnamanaya
- SIGNIS Salutation Award for Best Director 2003 - Agnidahaya.
- Presidential Award for Best Director 2003 - Agnidahaya
- Sumathi Best Teledrama Series Award 2009 - Hathara Denek Senpathiyo
- Sumathi Best Teledrama Director Award 2009 - Hathara Denek Senpathiyo
