= Heart FM (film) =

Heart FM හා(ර්)ට් එෆ්එම්
- Directed by: Senesh Dissanaike Bandara
- Written by: Nimmi Hathiyaldeniya; K. K. Saman Kumara; Senesh Dissanaike Bandara
- Produced by: EAP Films
- Starring: Gayan Wickramathillaka; Kanchana Mendis; Sachini Ayendra
- Cinematography: Puspakumara Bandara Rajaguru
- Edited by: Pravin Jayaratne
- Music by: Centigradz; Nawarathne Gamage
- Production companies: Gemini Color Lab, Chennai
- Distributed by: EAP Theatres
- Release date: 16 January 2008
- Country: Sri Lanka
- Language: Sinhala

Heart FM (Sinhala: හා(ර්)ට් එෆ්එම්) is a 2008 Sri Lankan Sinhala family drama film directed by Senesh Dissanaike Bandara and produced by Soma Edirisinghe for EAP Films. It stars Gayan Wickramathillaka, Kanchana Mendis and Sachini Ayendra in lead roles along with Aruna Liyan and Mahendra Perera. Music co-composed by Centigradz and Nawarathne Gamage. EAP Group also celebrated 50th anniversary of E.A.P. films with the production of this film. It is the 1099th Sri Lankan film in the Sinhala cinema.

== Plot ==
The story unravels that it is a person's qualities, not their looks that count. It is centered on three main characters, Shakya (Sachini Ayendra), a daughter of a politician, her sister Mandakini a.k.a. Mandy (Kanchana Mendis) and Rajiv, a young DJ working at a radio station (Gayan Wickramatileke). Shakya encounters Rajiv via 'Home Delivery' a song request programme.

Rajiv is touched by Shakya's tale of woe, a tale she relates by taking on a new identity - that of her sister's. Rajiv peruses the real Mandakini believing she is the one who continues to phone him. Finally the big day arrives with Rajiv encountering Mandakini. Day breaks with a close relationship forming between the duo.

Then the story takes two unexpected turns. Mandakini has a sickly daughter, Rachel (Dinuli Mallawarachchi), from a previous romantic encounter abroad. The father of the child (Aruna Lian) arrives in Sri Lanka for the custody of his daughter.

Mandakini has no other option but to turn towards Rajiv for help. Significantly at the same stage Shakya is faced with a dilemma. She who had arranged for Rajiv and her sister to meet realizes that she herself has a romantic attraction towards Rajiv, an attraction so strong that she is willing to break through social morals and family ties to get what she believes is hers.

Though the outward framework of 'Heart FM' is given a light touch the movie reveals the true state of the present society. Selfishness overtakes all barriers and ambitious individuals will take on any obstacle or risk to meet their needs.

This is revealed clearly towards the end as the disturbed mind of Shakya is brought out in the form of a series of episodes during her confession in a hypnotized stage to the psychiatrist. With a light hint of humour the director allows satire to take over as we watch how the green-eyed monster takes control over a once bubbly, happy-go-lucky character - a personification of the unbalanced mind itself.

Another aspect to take note is that the director had let the images do most of the talking. The count down of days pending for Shakya's exam and Rachel's operation is shown by the numerals pasted on the walls and on bedside tables in the character's rooms constantly hinting that the prank played on Rajiv is about to an end and the desperate situation of Mandakini which made her set aside her pride and ask for help from Rajiv and eventually her parents.

These scenes constantly enforced upon the viewer's mind, heightening the tension, may be a form of excusing Mandakini's actions in practically using Rajiv, a man she had just met for a charity promotional programme and trusts as far as to entrust her daughter's safety to him.

A question arises in the viewer's mind when Rajiv who was deeply affected by Shakya's prank fails to recognize her voice after having encountered her sister, Mandakini. Yet again he identifies her voice when the latter calls him from the hospital before things are brought to light.

== Cast ==
- Gayan Wickramathilaka as Rajiv
- Kanchana Mendis as Mandakini aka Mandy
- Sachini Ayendra as Shakya
- Dinuli Mallawaarachchi as Rachell
- Aruna Liyan as Shalitha
- Samanalee Fonseka as Uththara
- Sahan Ranwala as Sagara
- Irangani Serasinghe as Granny
- Tony Ranasinghe as Doctor Sri Vastav
- Chandani Seneviratne Mandy & Shakya's mother
- Mahendra Perera as Heart FM studio manager
- Srimal Wedisinghe as Mandy & Shakya's father
- Pradeep Senanayake as Psychiatrist
- Rex Kodippili as Child specialist doctor
- Deepani Silva as Granny's servant
- Roshan Ravindra in cameo appearance
- Chathurika Peiris in cameo appearance
- Dasun Pathirana in cameo appearance

== Soundtrack ==
No.	Title	Singer(s)	Length
1.	"Sihina Mandakiniye"	Mariazelle Goonetilleke, Deepika Priyadarshani, Lesley
2.	"Koheda Sneha Parthana"	Kasun Kalhara, Uresha Ravihari
3.	"Yawwana Sihina Lokaya"	Aruna Liyan
4.	"Hello Hello Nama Mokadda Oyage"	Centigradz, Chinthy, Ashanthi De Alwis
5.	"Pinbara Mawbime"	Centigradz, Teesha, Sureni de Mel
