= Hathara Denama Soorayo =

Hathara Denama Soorayo may refer to:

- Hathara Denama Soorayo (1971 film), a Sri Lankan Sinhala action romantic film
- Hathara Denama Soorayo (2008 film), a Sri Lankan Sinhala action romantic film, a remake of the above
