= W. B. Makuloluwa =

Sri Lankan composer and director (1922–1984)

W. B. Makuloluwa ඩබ්ලිව්. බී. මකුලොලුව
- Born: 17 February 1922; Harispattuwa, Kandy, Sri Lanka
- Died: 8 September 1984 (aged 62); Sri Lanka
- Education: Sri Rahula College, Kandy; Ananda College
- Occupations: Musician, author, dancer, director
- Years active: 1946–1984

William Bandara Makuloluwa (Sinhala: ඩබ්ලිව්. බී. මකුලොලුව), (17 February 1922 – 8 September 1984), popularly known as W. B. Makuloluwa, was a folk music composer, promoter and director of theater and film in Sri Lanka. Considered as a legend in Sri Lankan folk music history, Makuloluwa is the pioneer to introduce "Jane Gee" folk music in popular culture. He was also a talented speaker, scholar, Kathakali and Manipuri dancer as well as a songwriter.

== Personal life ==
Makuloluwa was born on 17 February 1922 in Idamegama village, Harispattuwa, Kandy. He completed primary education from Idamegama Primary College and later entered Sri Rahula College, Kandy and Ananda College, Colombo for secondary education. Makuloluwa studied traditional dance under the guidance of Rangama Gunamaala, J.C. Maalagammana and Tittawela Gunayaa.

His son Kosala Makuloluwa is a creative director in Swarnavahini, who made the popular programs Ganga Dige and Salang Hanthe.

== Career ==
He studied drama and music from Shanti Niketan in India under the maestro Rabindranath Tagore. He also studied esraj and sitar in Shanti Niketan. After completing education in India, he started to work as an English teacher at Sri Rahula College, Kandy. Later he became a Music Inspector in the Ministry of Education, as its Chief Director and Chief Director. He also served as the Creative Director of the Ministry of Culture and the Arts.

He believed Sinhalese music should follow the traditions of its folk music called "Jana Gee". Makuloluwa gathered a numerous Sinhalese folk poems by traveling around the country and tried to develop a unique style. While serving at Sri Palee College, Horana, he made a great contribution to music and produced famous students including Lionel Ranwala and W.D. Amaradeva. In 1946, he produced the drama Ohoma Hindada?.

Makuloluwa composed Sri Lanka's first musical symphonies such as Goyam Da magula, Maara Parajaya, Hira Geyin Marumuwata and Mahabinishkramanaya. He was the music director in critically acclaimed film Arunata Pera. Makuloluwa also produced ballet creations such as Pahanin Pahana and Tharanaya. He is the first principal at Teachers' College of Aesthetic Education Giragama, Pilimathalawa. Makuloluwa streamlined the folk music section of the school curriculum and categorized the folk songs and dot system.

He published several drama and folk music related books including Hela Gee Maga (1962), Gemi Geeya and Abhinawa Mulika Geetha. His book Hela Gee Maga includes theories on folk music and musical notes of several rural folk songs. In the book Abhinawa Mulika Geetha, Makuloluwa used Sinhala vocabulary for Hindustani songs to learn the music of Ragadhari.

Makuloluwa hosted many local concerts and various concerts abroad including folk musical concerts such as Nonimida Magula, Maara Parajaya, Sirageyin Marumuwata, Depano and Aesi Disi.
