= Chathurika Peiris =

Sri Lankan actress

Chathurika Peiris චතුරිකා පීරිස්
- Born: Kachchakaduge Chathurika Jayamani Peiris; 2 January 1981 (age 45); Colombo, Sri Lanka
- Education: Musaeus College
- Occupation: Actress
- Years active: 2002–present
- Spouse: Gayan Wickramathilake (2013-present)
- Partner: Roshan Pilapitiya (2005-2012)
- Father: Jayantha Peiris
- Relatives: Purnika Peiris (sister); Charitha Priyadarshani (Cousin sister); Edward Jayakody (Cousin brother-in-law); Peshala Manoj (brother-in-law)
- Awards: Best Actress

Kachchakaduge Chathurika Jayamani Peiris (born 2 January 1981) (Sinhala: චතුරිකා පීරිස්), popularly known as Chathurika Peiris, is an actress in Sri Lankan cinema and television. She is best known for the roles in television serials Sepalika, Swayanjatha and Hiru Thanivela.

== Personal life ==
Her father's elder brother Ariyadasa Peiris is also a veteran radio announcer and artiste of SLBC. Ariyadasa Peiris has two brothers, Jayantha Peiris and Ranjith Peiris and one daughter, Charitha Priyadarshani Peiris. Chathurika's father Jayantha Peiris is also a teledrama producer. Charitha is a popular singer, who is married to fellow veteran singer Edward Jayakody. Charitha and Edward has one son, Chandeepa and one daughter, Sharanya. Ranjith Peiris has two daughters, Niranjala Basnayake and Chamali Vathsala worked at Sri Lanka Rupavahini Corporation, Sri FM and Lakhanda Radio respectively.

Her younger sister, Purnika Pieris is also a teledrama actress and television host working in TV Derana. Poornika was married to Sahan Abeysekera, who is also a television host. Sahan and Purnika have one son, Adithya. The couple separated in 2017. In 2019, Purnika married musician and fellow television host Peshala Manoj.

Chathurika is initially dated with popular actor Roshan Pilapitiya for long time, where they separated in 2014. In 2014, she married fellow actor Gayan Wickramathilake. Gayana and Chathurika owned the garment shop "Bobby House". The couple has one daughter: Aradhana Hansadhwani.

== Career ==
She made her first cinema appearance in 2004 film Aadaraneeya Wassaanaya directed by Senesh Dissanayake Bandara, where she portrayed the main female role.

She won the Best Actress Awards for her leading role in Swayanjatha teledrama (2012) at the 8th Rupavahini State Awards ceremony in 2013. In 2012, she won the award for the Best Teledrama Supporting Actress for the same at Sumathi Tele Awards.

In 2009, she produced the television serial Sihina Kumari. In 2013, she acted in the stage play Mahasamayama.

=== Selected television serials ===
- Akuru Maki Na
- Amaya
- Bindunu Sith
- Gajamuthu
- Gini Weluma
- Hada Pudasuna
- Hiru Thanivela
- Hithuwakkarayo
- Indrachapa
- Isuru Sangramaya
- Karuvala Gedara
- Nethaka Maayavee
- Paaradeesaya
- Prarthana Mal
- Rajini
- Rangana Vijithaya
- Samanalayano
- Sathya
- Senehasa Kaviyak
- Sepalika
- Sihina Sithuvam
- Sihina Kumari
- Sith Bindi Rekha
- Sooriya Daruwo
- Sulang Kapolla
- Swayanjatha
- Therani Geethaya
- Vasanthaya Avilla
- Yaso Mandira
- Saheli
- Aathma
- Eka Raane Kurullo
- Sihina Aran Enna

== Filmography ==
Year	Film	Role	Ref.
2004	Aadaraneeya Wassaanaya	Chapa Gangadarie Abeynaike	
2006	Hiripoda Wassa	Pooja	
2006	Sonduru Wasanthe	Harshi	
2008	Heart FM	Cameo role	
2008	Nil Diya Yahana	Shehara	
2008	Machan	Shalini	
2008	Hathara Denama Soorayo	Nilmini	
2009	Sinasuna Adaren	Vihangi	
2010	Hadawatha Mal Yayai	Lihini	
2013	Samanala Sandhawaniya	Vadisha s' wife	
2018	Adarei Man	Malmi	

== Awards and accolades ==
=== Presidential Film Awards ===
Year	Nominee / work	Award	Result
2004	Aadaraneeya Wassaanaya	Best Upcoming Actress	Won

=== Sarasaviya Awards ===
Year	Nominee / work	Award	Result
2004	Aadaraneeya Wassaanaya	Best Upcoming Actress	Won

=== Rupavahini State Awards ===
Year	Nominee / work	Award	Result
2012	Swayanjatha	Best Actress	Won

=== Raigam Tele'es ===
Year	Nominee / work	Award	Result
2006		Most Popular Actress	Won
2007		Most Popular Actress	Won
2012	Swayanjatha	Best Actress	Won

=== Sumathi Awards ===
Year	Nominee / work	Award	Result
2006		Most Popular Actress	Won
2012	Swayanjatha	Best Supporting Actress	Won
