= Swara (film) =

- Sinhala: ස්වර
- Directed by: Sanjaya Nirmal
- Written by: Yolanda Weerasinghe
- Produced by: Nita Fernando; Chandran Rutnam; Manohan Nanayakkara; Rohan Welivita
- Starring: Nita Fernando; Sachini Ayendra
- Cinematography: Prabath Roshan
- Edited by: Lal Dissanayake; Nanda Jayakodi
- Music by: Ranga Dassanayake
- Release date: 1 December 2023
- Country: Sri Lanka
- Language: Sinhala

Swara (Notes) (Sinhala: ස්වර) is a 2023 Sri Lankan Sinhala adult medical drama film directed by Sanjaya Nirmal and co-produced by Nita Fernando, Chandran Ratnam, Manohan Nanayakkara and Rohan Welivita. It film star ensemble cast where Nita Fernando and Sachini Ayendra in lead roles along with Anusha Rajapakse, Kanchana Kodithuwakku and Nadeeka Gunasekara in supportive roles. Music composed by Ranga Dassanayake.

== Plot ==
The film based on AIDS patient Narmadha, who is a renowned musician but struggle in the life. In the meantime, she has to face various conflicts and the relationships with the seven different characters: Justin, Padma, Vihara, Nimanthi, Joe, Rohan and Anjali.

== Cast ==
- Nita Fernando
- Sachini Ayendra
- Anusha Rajapakse
- Kanchana Kodithuwakku
- Damitha Abeyratne
- Jeewan Kumaranatunga
- Sriyantha Mendis
- Mahendra Weerarathna
- Mercy Edirisinghe
- Nadeeka Gunasekara
- Daminda Porage
- Charith Abeysinghe
- Iranganie Serasinghe
- Mahendra Perera
- Semini Iddamalgoda
- Sarath Kothalawala
- Buddhika Jayaratne
- Upeksha Swarnamali
- Sriyani Kodithuwakku
- Menaka Rajapakse
- Sanjeewani Weerasinghe
- Nanda Mahawatte
- Chula Padmendra Kumarapathirana
- Veena Jayakody
- Asela Jayakody
- Kuma Aththanayake
- Sanjewwa Dissanayake
- Danu Innasithamby
