= Roshan Ravindra =

Sri Lankan actor

- රොෂාන් රවීන්ද්‍ර
- Born: Rajapaksha Thewage Ravindra Kumar Karunachandra; 13 June 1978 (age 48); Sri Lanka
- Occupations: Actor, Producer, Director
- Years active: 2004–present

Roshan Ravindra Karunachandra (Sinhala: රොෂාන් රවින්ද්‍ර) is an actor in Sri Lankan cinema, theater and television as well as a director, Makeup Artist, Assistant Director and Producer. Often regarded as one of the best tele drama actors of Sri Lanka, Ravindra is a recipient of Best Actor Award in many local award festivals in multiple times.

== Personal life ==
Ravindra first studied at Rukmalgama School, then at Wawela Rajasinghe School. Then he initially worked in the hotel industry and later got the opportunity to join with the veterans Priyantha Sirikumara and Samarasiri Kandanage.

== Career ==
While working in the hotel industry, Ravindra went to several acting schools and studied two years diploma in youth service council. He also participated in the workshops of drama experts like Somalatha Subasinghe, and Anoja Weerasinghe. Before acting, Ravindra worked as a make-up artist in some films such as Sudu Kalu Saha Alu. His most popular television acting was as the title role in Uthuwan Kande Sura Saradiyal and in Sahodaraya. His first project as a television producer was the teledrama Rasthiyadukaraya, directed by Lakmini Amaradewa, followed by Kadadora directed by Rajiv Ananda.

In 2020, he directed his maiden television serial, Thanamalvila Kollek. In 2021, he won the Best Actor award at the Sumathi Awards for his performance in the teledrama Veeraya Gedara Awith.

=== Selected television serials ===
- Aebarthu Aetha
- Ahasin Watuna
- Amuthu Minissu
- Badde Kulawamiya
- Binari
- Daskon
- Dedunnen Eha
- Degammediyawa
- Eelangata Mokada Wenne
- Fantasy Avenue
- Golu Thaththa
- Hiru Avarata
- Hopalu Arana
- Idorayaka Mal Pipila
- Ikibindina Tharuka
- Ilandari Handawa
- Kaala Nadee Gala Basi
- Kadadora
- Kaneru
- Manik Maliga
- Mage Kaviya Mata Denna
- Mass
- Nidi Kumari
- Nopenena Ananthaya
- Parasathu Mal
- Pulina Prasada
- Ran Hiru Res
- Rasthiyadukaraya
- Rathriya Manaram
- Sahodaraya
- Samanalayano
- Samanalunta Wedithiyanna
- Sanda Ginigath Rathriya
- Sathya
- Sinansenna Anuththara
- Situwara Puwatha
- Thaara
- Thaaththe Api Awa
- Thunmanthanna
- Uthuwan Kande Sura Saradiyal
- Vishmaya
- Warna
- Wasuli Kanda
- Weeraya Gedara Awith
- Natath Ayek Sura Mathin

== Stage Dramas ==
- Mister President

== Filmography ==
Ravindra's first major role in a film was Kasun in the 2004 film Aadaraneeya Wassaanaya, directed by Senesh Dissanaike Bandara.

Key
†	Denotes films that have not yet been released

Year	Film	Role	Ref.
2004	Aadaraneeya Wassaanaya	Kasun	
2007	Uppalawanna	Rebel	
2008	Heart FM	Cameo role	
2009	Ekamath Eka Rateka		
2012	Mouse	Drug addict	
2015	Address Na	Embilipitiye Karaa	
2017	Aloko Udapadi	Theeya Brahmin	
2017	Sulanga Gini Aran		
2019	Bhavatharana		
2024	Guru Geethaya	Dyuyshen	
TBA	Tharu Athara Mama †	Sahan	
TBA	Thanapathilage Gedara †		
TBA	Secret of the Rose †		
TBA	The DarkFall †		
TBA	Alone In A Maelstrom †		
TBA	All About My Girl †		
2026	Eda Raa	Milton Mallawarachchi	

== Awards and accolades ==
Ravindra has won several awards at local stage drama festivals and television festivals for dramatic roles.

=== Derana Film Awards ===
Year	Nominee / work	Award	Result
2016	Address Na	Best Supporting Actor	Nominated

=== Hiru Golden Film Awards ===
Year	Nominee / work	Award	Result
2017	Sulanga Gini Aran	Best Supporting Actor	Nominated

=== Sarasaviya Awards ===
Year	Nominee / work	Award	Result
2017	Sulanga Gini Aran	Best Supporting Actor	Won

=== Presidential Awards ===
Year	Nominee / work	Award	Result
2004	Adaraneeya Wassanaya	Best Upcoming Actor	Won
2017	Sulanga Gini Aran	Best Supporting Actor	Won

=== Signis Awards ===
Year	Nominee / work	Award	Result
2008	Uthpalawanna	Exceptional Talent	Won
2011	Binari	Exceptional Talent	Won
2018	Badde Kulawamiya	Best Actor	Nominated
2019	Ilandari Handaawa / Sahodaraya	Best Actor	Nominated
2020	Thanamalwila Kollek	Best Director	Won
2021	Weeraya Gedara Awith	Best Actor	Won

=== Sumathi Awards ===
Year	Nominee / work	Award	Result
2006	Idorayaka Mal Pipila	Best Upcoming Actor	Won
2011	Abarthu Atha	Best Actor	Won
2012	Ahasin Watuna	Best Actor	Nominated
2012	Mage Kaviya Mata Denna	Best Supporting Actor	Nominated
2015	Jeewithayaka Kedapathak	Best Single Episode	Won
2015	Wasuli Kanda	Best Actor	Nominated
2016	Daskon	Best Actor	Nominated
2019	Sahodaraya	Best Actor	Nominated
2021	Weeraya Gedara Awith	Best Actor	Won
2023	Sathya	Best Actor	Nominated
2023	Thanamalwila Kollek	Best Teledrama Director	Won

=== Raigam Tele'es ===
Year	Nominee / work	Award	Result
2010	Abarthu Atha	Best Actor	Won
2012	Kadadora	Best Actor	Nominated
2013	Hopalu Arana	Best Actor	Nominated
2016	Daskon	Best Actor	Won
2017	Badde Kulawamiya	Best Actor	Nominated
2018	Sahodaraya	Best Actor	Won
2019	Weeraya Gedara Awith	Best Actor	Nominated
2020	Sathya	Best Actor	Nominated
2020	Thanamalvila Kollek	Best Director	Won

=== State Television Awards ===
Year	Nominee / work	Award	Result
2014	Thaaththe Api Awa	Best Supporting Actor	Won
2015	Daskon	Best Actor	Won
2020	Weeraya Gedara Awith	Best Actor	Won
