= Sachini Ayendra Stanley =

Sri Lankan actress and model

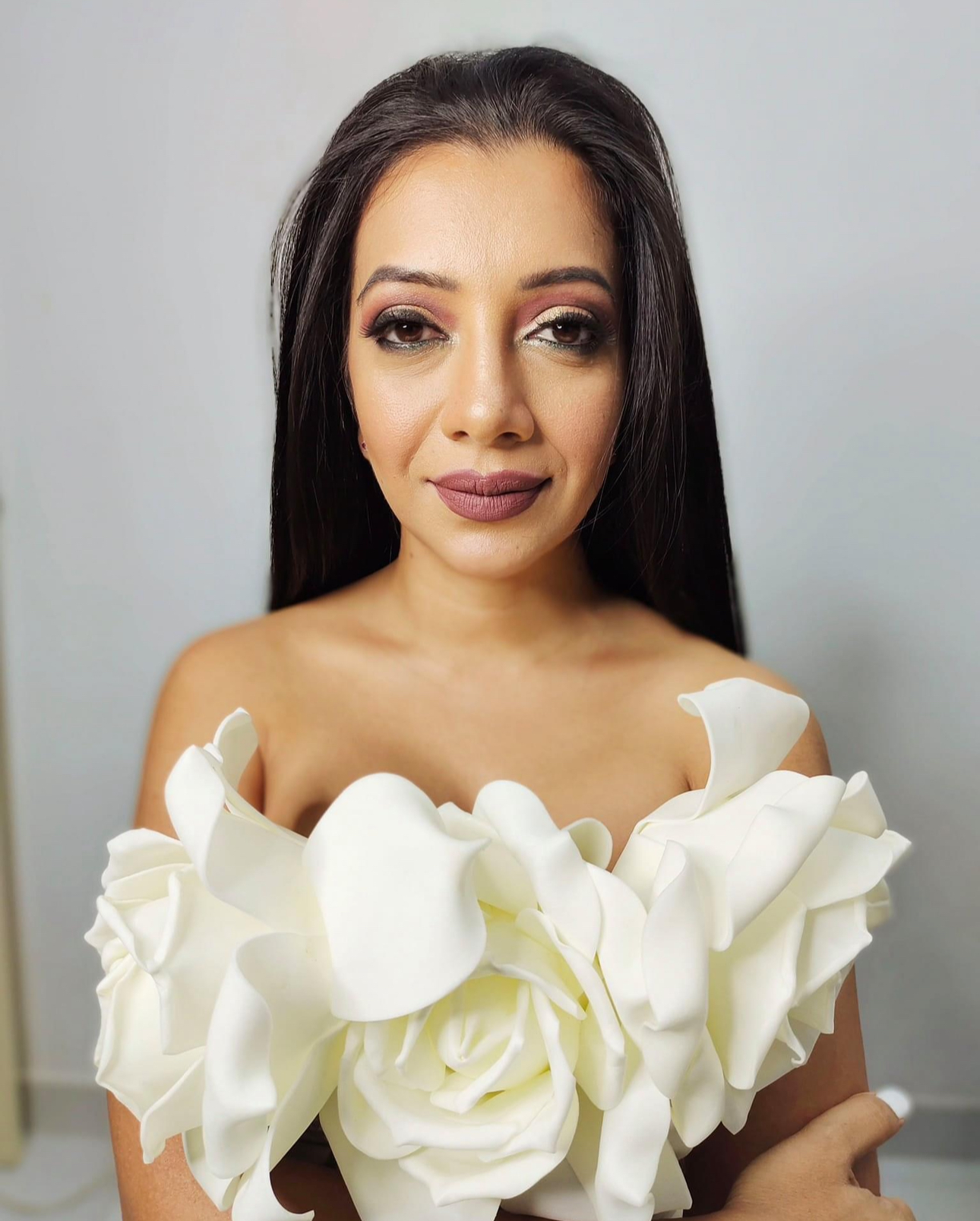
- Born: Sachini Ayendra Stanley; Kandy, Sri Lanka
- Occupations: Film actress, Model
- Spouse: Ishanga Mahipala
- Beauty pageant titleholder
- Years active: 2003–present

Sachini Ayendra Stanley (Sinhala: සචිනි අයේන්ද්‍රා ස්ටැන්ලි) is a Sri Lankan actress and beauty pageant titleholder. She won Miss World Sri Lanka 2003 and represented her country at Miss World 2003. She currently working in the Sinhala film industry, her first film Aadaraneeya Wassaanaya directed by Senesh Dissanaike Bandara was released in 2004. She won the award for best supporting actress at Signis Sri Lanka Film Awards for her performance.

== Early life and background ==
Ayendra was born in Kandy, Sri Lanka, the youngest child of David Stanley and Thamara Wadasinghe. She studied at the Hillwood College, Kandy, completing her advanced levels in arts. In addition she was a member of the young writers club, school choir, drama club, interact club, school debating team, English literary association and took swimming, tennis and rugby as a sport. Sachini was the winner of best model in Kandy at a pageant in 2002 and Miss Sri Lanka in 2003 and she represented Sri Lanka at the Miss World 2003 pageant.

== Career ==
Sachini started her modeling career while still in school and her first special award was Best Model Kandy in 2002. Following that she appeared in many leading TV commercials of the Elephant House soft drink called Ride, the Sthree advertisement of the National Savings Bank in 2002. She later moved to Colombo to further her acting and modeling careers. Though her most popular character was played in the movie Adaraneeya Wassanaya, her break through performance was the movie Sankara as a poor girl working in sugar cane fields living in a remote village in Sri Lanka. Her performance in the movie ‘Heart FM’ in 2007 as a mentally disturbed girl also brought her a lot of praise and a merit award at the Signis Sri Lanka Film festival in 2009.

After winning the Miss Sri Lanka contest and best supporting actress award at the Signis Awards for Adaraneeya Wassanaya, she received her first nomination for Sarasaviya and Presidential Film Awards. Her second film Sankara was one of her best performances.

She made her television debut playing the title role in the drama Hiruni directed by Kumarasiri Abeykoon on Sirasa TV in 2005. Her stage debut was as the character Sarala in the play For Better or For Worse directed by Indu Dharmasena in 2009.

She is the first Sri Lankan to compete in the world championships of performing arts in Los Angeles in the U.S. in 2016. She won two silver medals and one bronze for acting categories classical/open/contemporary. She competed again in the world championships of performing arts in 2017 and won 4 bronze medals for acting Categories she also won an honorary mention for best national costume.

In 2021, she appeared in the Raffealla Fernando Celebrity Calendar along with many other Sri Lankan celebrities.

== Filmography ==
=== As actress ===
Year	Film	Role	Notes
2003	Adaraneeya Wassanaya	Madhupani	Winner, Signis Sri Lanka Film Awards best supporting actress Nominated, Sarasaviya Awards best supporting actress Nominated, Presidential Film Awards best supporting actress
2006	Sankara	Upamali	Winner, Signis Sri Lanka Film Awards -best Supporting actress
2007	Heart FM	Shakya	
2010	Angara Dangara	Nadee	
2013	Siri Parakum	Yonaka	
2017	Swara	Nimanthi	
2017	Nimnayaka Hudekalawa	Advertising executive	
2023	Swara		
TBD	Thanapathilage Gedara		
TBD	Megha		

=== As producer ===
- 2010 - Angara Dangara

== Television ==
Year	Drama	Director
2005	Mayadunne	Rathnasiri Paranavithana
2005	Rala Bindena Thena	Senesh Bandara Dissanayeke
2005	Lochana	Sanjaya Mahavithana
2005	Hiruni	Kumarasiri Abeykoon
2006	Kampitha vila	Dharmasena Pathiraja
2006	Surangana Duwa	Malini Fonseka
2008	Sherlock Holmes	Sanjaya Nirmal
2009	Situ Diyaniyo	Mohan Niyaz
2009	Sihina wasanthayak	Saranga Mendis
2011	Ran Samanalayo	Sandaruwan Jayawickrama
2017	Rumassala	Boodee Keerthisena
