= Superstar (2008 Sinhala film) =

- Sinhala: සුපර් ස්ටාර්
- Directed by: A.A Junaideen
- Written by: A.A Junaideen
- Starring: Sanath Gunathilake; Kanchana Mendis; Rex Kodippili
- Cinematography: Lalith M. Thomas
- Edited by: Kumarasiri de Silva
- Music by: Jayantha Ratnayake
- Production company: AJ Films
- Release date: 31 January 2008
- Country: Sri Lanka
- Language: Sinhala

Superstar (Sinhala: සුපර් ස්ටාර්) is a 2008 Sri Lankan Sinhala action romantic comedy film produced by AJ Films. It stars Sanath Gunathilake and Kanchana Mendis in lead roles along with Rex Kodippili and Cletus Mendis. Music composed by Jayantha Ratnayake. It is the 1100th Sri Lankan film in the Sinhala cinema.

== Cast ==
- Sanath Gunathilake as Ranjith Bandara
- Kanchana Mendis
- Rex Kodippili as Jayawardana
- Cletus Mendis
- G.R Perera
- Ananda Athukorala
- Manjula Thilini
