= Sumathi Best Upcoming Teledrama Actor Award =

Annual award for Sri Lankan upcoming actor

The Sumathi Best Teledrama Supporting Actor Award is presented annually in Sri Lanka by the Sumathi Group of Campany associated with many commercial brands for the best Sri Lankan Upcoming actor of the year in television screen.

The award was first given in 1995. Following is a list of the winners of this prestigious title since then.

== Award winners ==
Year	Best Upcoming Actor	Teledrama	Ref.
1995	Senaka Wijesinghe	Dandubasnamanaya	
1996	Janaka Kumbukage	Isiwara Asapuwa	
1997	Jagath Benaragama	Ransirige Sangramaya	
1998	Mervin Maheshan	Manawa Warana	
1999	Ashen Manjula	Ipanali	
2000	Roshan Pilapitiya	Gini Dalu Mada	
2001	Sanath Wimalasiri	Rajina	
2002	Chathura Weerawardena	Oru Bandi Siyambalawa	
2003	Bimal Jayakody	Hada Wila Sakmana	
2004	Buddhika Damayantha	WWW.Com	
2006	Roshan Ravindra	Idorayata Mal Pipila	
2007	Kanchana Kodithuwakku	Haya Wani Patumaga	
2008	Chandika Nanayakkara	Suba Sihina Ahawarai	
2009	Saranga Disasekara	Sasara Badi Bami	
2010	Suresh Gamage	Sadisi Tharanaya	
2011	Jagath Manuwarna	Thaksalawa	
2012	Malinda Perera	Ath Kanda Lihini	
2013	Eranga Jeewantha	Piyavi	
2014	Sarath Karunaratne	Agni	
2015	Sudarshana Bandara	Sihina Aran Enna	
2016	Ruwan Perera	Daskon	
2017	Sajitha Anuththara	Boheemiyanuwa	
2018	Dineth de Silva	See Raja	
2019	Kalana Gunasekara	Koombiyo	
2021	Sanjaya Muramudali	Amuthu Rasikaya	
