= Sumathi Most Popular Actor Award =

The Sumathi Popular Teledrama Actor Award is presented annually in Sri Lanka by the Sumathi Group of Companies for the most Popular Sri Lankan television actor of the year, determined by a publicly popular vote.

Channa Perera and Kavinga Perera has received the award three times becoming most awarded.

The annual award was first given in 1995. The following is a list of the winners of this award since then.

Year	Popular Actor	Ref.
1995	Kamal Addararachchi	
1996	Lucky Dias	
1997	Jeewan Kumaranatunga	
1998	Palitha Silva	
1999	Sriyantha Mendis	
2000	Lucky Dias	
2001	Channa Perera	
2002	Channa Perera	
2003	Channa Perera	
2004	Roshan Pilapitiya	
2005	Not Awarded	
2006	Roshan Pilapitiya	
2007	Suraj Mapa	
2008	Roshan Ranawana	
2009	Chandika Nanayakkara	
2010	Chandika Nanayakkara	
2011	Saranga Disasekara	
2012	Dhananjaya Siriwardena	
2013	Vishwa Kodikara	
2014	Vishwa Kodikara	
2015	Kavinga Perera	
2016	Kavinga Perera	
2017	Kavinga Perera	
2018	Raween Kanishka	
2019	Sumiran Gunasekara	
2020	Not Awarded	
2021	Sajitha Anuththara	
2022	Not Awarded	
2023	Uddika Premarathna	
2024	Saranga Disasekara	
2025	Saranga Disasekara	
2026	Akila Dhanuddara	
