= Sahan Ranwala =

Sri Lankan actor (born 1978)

Sahan Ranwalaa සහන් රන්වල
- Born: July 3, 1978 (age 48); Sri Lanka
- Education: Ashoka Vidyalaya, Maradana; Ananda College
- Alma mater: University of Colombo; University of Sri Jayewardenepura; Sri Lanka Law College
- Occupations: Actor, dramatist
- Years active: 1996–present
- Spouse: Melani Ranwala
- Children: 1
- Father: Lionel Ranwala
- Relatives: Chirantha Ranwala (brother)
- Website: https://ranwala.lk/

Sahan Ranwala (born July 3, 1978, as සහන් රන්වල [Sinhala]) is an actor in Sri Lankan cinema, stage drama and television. He is also works as a musician, composer and a presenter. He is the managing director of Lionel Ranwala Folk Art Foundation.

== Personal life ==
Sahan Ranwala was born on July 3, 1978, in Nugegoda as the second of the family with two siblings. He started education at Asoka Vidyalaya, Maradana. After passing grade 5 scholarship examination, he went to Ananda College. At school, Sahan was the Chairman of Drama Society and the Treasurer of Broadcasting Unit. He did A/L from commerce stream and selected to the University of Colombo. His elder brother Chirantha is a television announcer and also an actor.

His father Lionel Ranwala was an icon in Sri Lanka music industry who performed folk music in Sri Lanka. Lionel is the founder of Ranwala Balakaya. Sahan is a graduate from Drama and Theater at University of Kelaniya. He also has a Diploma in Journalism at the University of Sri Jayewardenepura and degree from Sri Lanka Law College.

He is married to Melani Ranwala and the couple has one son, Seth Ranwala.

== Education ==
Sahan went to Asoka College, Colombo and Ananda College. Sahan completed Business Management degree in University of Colombo, Mass Media degree in University of Jayawardanapura. And he is also post graduate in Buddhist Studies in University of Kelaniya and he has Master's degree in Drama and the Theatre in University of Kelaniya.

Also, Sahan was the island first in Statistics exam held by Association of Accounting Technicians Sri lanka.

== Career ==
Sahan started his career under his father Lionel in his folk music group called Ranwala Balakaya. After the death of father, Sahan started to continue his legacy by conducting folk musical programs all over the country. After three years of father's death, Sahan presented folk musical program Yuddetath Awith. He also conducted concerts such as Gama Avlanynaan, Ahasei Innawalu, Three and Mei Avurudu Kaale. He also able to perform at the local festivals in Galle, Colombo and Jaffna Music Festivals and international festival such as CHOGM. In 2003, Ranwala started Ranwala Lama Balakaya for youngsters between the ages of 10–18.

In 1996, Sahan worked as an announcer at Sirasa TV by presenting the program Kala Kalasa. Sahan started acting career in 2003 with television serial Ranga Madala Samuganee directed by Milton Jayawardhane.

His drama Velava Keeyada? was selected for the finals of State Drama Festival in 2009. He currently conducts a children's program Puduma Iskole.

In 2011, Ranwala Balakaya won the award for the "Best Performing Folk Song Troupe" at the Folk Songs Festival at Guangxi, China. He is the author of the book titled Welawa Keeyada. He conduct a course on folk songs in Battaramulla on every Sundays. Ranwala Balakaya released Gama Avulannan and Yuddhetath Evith in VCD and DVD formats.

In 2012, Sahan initiated a musical program Gayamu at BMICH Kamatha. In 2016, he organized Jana Gee Ekassa and Dekassa presentation for children at the Bishop's College Auditorium.

Sahan started his film career with Aadaraneeya Wassaanaya back in 2004, directed by Senesh Dissanaike Bandara with a supportive role.

In 2006, Sahan acted for the television series Paba in 2006, directed by Mahesh Rathsara Madduma Arachchi with a supportive role.

On December 1, 2019, he along with Ranwala Balakaya organized a folk musical show titled "Ran Salakuna", which will be held at Kularatne Hall, Ananda College, College. In January 2021, he released "Ranwala Lanka e-school" which covers a wide range of subjects including folk songs and performing arts, drumming and art and is planned to be held under two syllabi, internationally and locally.

=== Notable television works ===
- Bharyawo
- Deva Daruwo
- Deweni Inima
- Gini Avi Saha Gini Keli
- Hadawathe Kathawa
- Iskole
- Jeewithaya Lassanai
- Millewa Walawwa
- Paba
- Rajini
- Ranga Madala Samuganee
- Sithin Siyawara
- Yaso Mandira

== Filmography ==
Year	Film	Role	Ref.
2004	Aadaraneeya Wassaanaya	Niranga	
2004	One Shot	Vijaya's brother	
2008	Heart FM	Sagara	
2010	Uththara	Praveen Pathiratne	
2023	Kathuru Mithuru	Fat guy in tailor shop	
2025	Kaasi Vaasi	Music composition	
TBA	18 Wanguwa †		

== Awards and accolades ==
He won the award for the Best Upcoming Actor at the Sumathi Awards ceremony in 2003.

=== Sumathi Awards ===
Year	Nominee / work	Award	Result
2003	Ranga Madala Samuganee	Best Upcoming Actor	Won

== Sinhala articles ==
- සරොම්, චීත්ත අන්දලා නැති සංස්‌කෘතියක්‌ මවාපාන්න පිරිසක්‌ උත්සාහ කරනවා
- මේ වෙද්දි රන්වල බළකාය ලෝකෙ හොඳම ජන ගී කණ්ඩායම
- ගමේ අයට ගමේ දේ වටින්නෙ නෑ
- දැනුමෙන් ගයමු
- රන්වලත් ඔන්ලයින් තරඟයක
