= Lionel Ranwala =

Sri Lankan musician (1939–2002)

Lionel Ranwala ලයනල් රන්වල
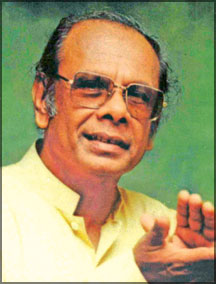
- Born: 27 November 1939; Sri Lanka
- Died: 13 November 2002 (aged 62); Thalawathugoda, Sri Lanka
- Education: Panjab University
- Occupations: Musician, composer, singer, actor
- Children: Sahan Ranwala; Chirath Ranwala
- Website: http://ranwala.lk/

Lionel Ranwala (Sinhala: ලයනල් රන්වල), (27 November 1939 – 13 November 2002) was a musician and a singer in Sri Lanka and a legend in Sri Lankan folk music. His birth city was Kalubowila and he studied in Kalubowila Budhdhagosha College, Kumara College Wellawatta and Lumbini College, Colombo.

== Career ==
Ranwala's main interest was Sinhala folk music of Sri Lankan. He successfully brought Sinhala folk tunes and melodies to popular Sri Lankan music, preserving their originality. He studied music at the Panjab University, Chandigarh, India and has a sour knowledge of the field.

Ranwala, who created a revolution in the local folk music scene along with his mentor W.B. Makuloluwa, started his teaching career at Arawwala MMV in 1959. He taught music at several leading schools including Ananda College, and Royal College, Colombo during a 38-year career. He popularised local music in schools and formed the first 'Hevisi' band in a school – at Pannipitiya Dharmapala Vidyalaya in 1964. Ranwala was also a versatile actor and dramatist. One of his most memorable roles was in the first Sinhala opera 'Depano' directed by Makuloluwa. He also wrote and directed several children's dramas. He acted in several teledramas. His last teledrama was "Rangamadala Samugani" which was telecasted in Swarnawahini.

He travelled all over the island collecting folk songs for posterity. A staunch defender of indigenous music, he released several cassettes containing experimental folk music, notably 'Ahase Innavalu' in 1999. He formed the 'Thaalama Foundation' for preserving folk music. "Gama Ahulaggang", "May Awurudu kale" and "Wannam Sawudam" are some of his most famous songs.

He has two sons, Chirantha and Sahan. The elder, Chirantha is a presenter and producer at Swarnavahini. Sahan is also working at the Swarnawahini, but after his father's sudden death, has now taken the initiative to preserve and make people aware of Sinhala Folk Music, in the same way his father did. His son, Sahan Ranwala doing very well in preserving the legacy of his father.

== Death ==
Ranwala died, following a sudden accident at the age of 63, in 2002 at Thalawathugoda. His wife too faced the accident and was seriously injured.

== Produced Stage Dramas ==
- Eka gediyay pala gaththe
- Beeri Ali
- Nogiya gamana

== Songs ==
- Ahase Innawalu
- Ahuwama Kan Pirena
- Akulagena Sonda
- Kelipodda Baledi
- Me Awurudu Kale
- Mithuru Sarouhura
- Pankiriththi
- Pasunu Karal
- Sanda Saawee Ma
- Sawanath Kinihara
- Soya
- Wannam Sawudam
- Yuddetath Awith
