= Guru Geethaya =

- Theatrical Poster in Australian Film Premiere
- Sinhala: ගුරු ගීතය
- Directed by: Upali Gamlath
- Written by: Upali Gamlath
- Based on: The First Teacher by Chinghiz Aitmatov
- Produced by: Arosha Fernando; Predi Seneviratne; Upali Gamlath
- Starring: Roshan Ravindra; Damayanthi Fonseka; Lanka Bandaranayeke; Kalpani Jayasinghe
- Cinematography: Kavinda Ranaweera
- Edited by: Upali Gamlath
- Music by: Lelum Rathnayeke
- Production company: Moonstone movie pvt ltd
- Distributed by: MPI Theatres
- Release dates: 29 November 2015 (Australia); 12 December 2024 (Sri Lanka)
- Running time: 95 min
- Country: Sri Lanka
- Language: Sinhala

Guru Geethaya (transl. The teacher's song; Sinhala: ගුරු ගීතය) is a 2015 Sri Lankan Sinhala-language drama film directed by Upali Gamlath and co-produced by Predi Seneviratne, Upali Gamlath and Arosha Fernando. It stars Roshan Ravindra, Damayanthi Fonseka, Lanka Bandaranayeke and Kalpani Jayasinghe. The film is based on Chinghiz Aitmatov's novel, The First Teacher (1962).

== Plot ==
The action takes place in the years from 1924 all the way to the early 1950s in the Kukureu village of the Kyrgyz Soviet Socialist Republic, which is now Kyrgyzstan. The Russian Civil War ended not so long ago. Young Komsomol member and a former Red Army soldier Dyuyshen comes to the village as the new teacher of the village. His enthusiasm to bring new ideas immediately faces a centuries-old tradition of life in Central Asia. The former soldier tries to improve literacy to this far Moslem area while villagers didn't allow gỉrls to attend school. He then met Altynai, a 15-year-old illiterate girl who has a burning desire to study, but her aunt sells her to a powerful and wealthy chieftain. Then school is burned down and is rebuilt using centuries old trees, being a pride to the local population.

== Cast ==
- Roshan Ravindra as Dyuyshen
- Kalpani Jayasinghe as Altynai
- Damayanthi Fonseka
- Gamini Hettiarachchi as Altynai's uncle
- Hyacinth Wijeratne
- Lanka Bandaranayeke as Altynai's aunt
- Jehan Srikanth
- Predi Seneviratne
- Subuddhi Lakmali
- Lakruwan Vithanage as merchant
- Arosha Fernando
- Dolkar Gurung
- Dom Thamang
- Sonam Gurung
- Aboo Gurung
- Tsring Thamang
- Anitha Gurung
- Chunda Karma
- Geetha Thamang

== Production ==
The film was scheduled to shoot in 4 countries respectively Sri Lanka, Nepal, India and Russia. This was filmed in the scenic village of Mannag and Tilicho in Nepal's Annapurna Himalayan range and in the highest altitude on Mount Everest.

The film marked the second feature film direction by Upali Gamlath after 2018 Sinhala, Hindi bilingual film Kalu Hima. Gamlath also handled the screenplay, sound Mixing, and editing. The film is produced by Arosha Fernando along with director and Alfred Seneviratne. Assistant Directors are Lakruwan Withanage, Isuru Thisara whereas Kavinga Ranaweera made Cinematography and Manjula Kumarasinghe with camera support and focus. Art Direction done by Poorna Jayashree with the support of Thushara Chamith Perera and Anitha Gurung. Make-up done by Tharaka Adhikari and Costume design done by Lanka Bandaranaik. Special Effects and Sound Mixing completed by R. Chamara Madhusankha with the sound support by Isuru Thisara. Background Voice made by Krishantha Dayananda along with International Promotion by Ashley Ratnavibhushan, and Ranjani Ratnavibhushan. Product Management is done by Sarath Rupasingha and Subtitle translation by Chandana Srimalwatta.

Lelum Ratnayake composed the music where he made background vocals with Kitsiri Jayasekara and Meena Prasadini. Lyrics done by Jude Nuvan Liyanage, Nilar N. Qasim, and Poorna Jayashri.

== Release ==
The film was released as a premiere in 2015 November 29 in Melbourne, Australia as an aid of Piyapath Scholarship Program. It has been selected to premiere in Eurasia International Film Festival held from September 24 to 30 in Kazakhstan. The film was released on 12 December 2024 in Sri Lankan theatres.
