= Premawanthayo =

Premawanthayo ප්‍රේමවන්තයෝ
- Directed by: Nishantha de Alwis
- Written by: Nishantha de Alwis
- Produced by: Susan Fernando
- Starring: Swarna Mallawarachchi; Simon Navagattegama; Nadeeka Gunasekara
- Cinematography: K.D Dayananda
- Edited by: Kumarasiri de Silva
- Music by: Athula Somasiri
- Production company: Dil Process Lab
- Release date: 3 September 2004
- Country: Sri Lanka
- Language: Sinhala

Premawanthayo (The Lovers) (Sinhala: ප්‍රේමවන්තයෝ) is a 2004 Sri Lankan Sinhala drama film directed by Nishantha de Alwis and produced by Susan Fernando. It stars Swarna Mallawarachchi and Simon Navagattegama in lead roles along with Nadeeka Gunasekara and Jayalath Manoratne. Music composed by Athula Somasiri. It is the 1036th Sri Lankan film in the Sinhala cinema.

== Cast ==
- Swarna Mallawarachchi
- Simon Navagattegama
- Nadeeka Gunasekara
- Indrajith Navinna
- Gothami Pathiraja
- Mervyn Jayatunga
- Jayalath Manoratne
- Francis Wanniarachchi
- Elson Divithurugama
- Seetha Kumari
