= Chandika Nanayakkara =

Sri Lankan actor (born 1978)

- චන්දික නානායක්කාර
- Born: Nanayakkara Wasan Pallage Viraj Chandika Nanayakkara; 3 April 1978 (age 48); Pelmadulla, Sri Lanka
- Education: Gankanda National College, Pelmadulla
- Occupations: Actor, Dramatist
- Years active: 2002–present
- Awards: Best Actor; Popular Actor

Nanayakkara Wasan Pallage Viraj Chandika Nanayakkara, popularly known as Chandika Nanayakkara (චන්දික නානායක්කාර) [Sinhala]), is an actor in Sri Lankan cinema and television. Nanayakkara won the award for the most popular actor in Sumathi Awards in two consecutive years, 2009 and 2010. He is mostly working in television serials.

== Personal life ==
His father was the deputy principal as well as disciplinary teacher of his school and mother was a housewife. He has two sisters and a brother. He completed A/L education from Gankanda National College, Pelmadulla. At school, he placed third in an all-island Creative Writing competition.

== Acting career ==
At school stage, he became a regular visitor to watch weekly stage dramas held at school. He continued to attend drama seminars organized by renowned artists like Kaushalya Fernando and Mahendra Perera. In 2003, he won the ‘Tharumansala’ competition organised by Sirasa TV. His beginning into the acting was accidental. While enrolled into Open University of Sri Lanka he met a friend working on a film set. He asked from Nanayakkara to do a small part in his movie Mother Theresa. In 2006, he produced a tele series Suba Sihina with one of his friends. Then his next tele production came through Haratha Hera. He involved for the first Russian television series filmed in Sri Lanka.

On 11 November 2008, he took part in Tharu-Rayak show held in Dubai. He is the brand ambassador for Lak Salu Sala. After 17 years, he graduated with a degree in Mass Communication which he started in 1994 from Open University of Sri Lanka.

=== Selected television serials ===
- Adaraya Gindarak
- Ama
- Asirimath Daladagamanaya
- Bath Amma
- Bawa Sarana
- Bhawa Siddhantha
- Click
- Daangale
- Daskon
- Dedunu
- Doni
- Doowaru
- Hansi
- Haratha Hera
- Hima Kandulu
- Isuru Sangramaya
- Ithin Eeta Passe
- Jeewithaya Thawa Durai
- Kumee
- Kurulu Pihatu
- Labendiye
- Medagedara
- Me Mamai
- Minipura Hatana
- Mini Kirana
- Mosam Sulan
- Muthu
- Nethu
- Olu
- Palingu Piyapath
- Paradeese
- Premathi Jayathi Soko
- Ran Sevaneli
- Ron Soya
- Sanda Hiru Tharu
- Sara
- Sarisara Lihini
- Sihinyaki Jeewithe
- Siththaravi
- Sneha
- Suba Sihina Ahawarai
- Sudu Anguru
- Surangana Duwa
- Susumaka Ima
- Thodu
- Thune Kelesiya
- Uthpala
- Veronika
- Vesak Sanda Ra
- Visula Ahasa Yata
- Waluka
- Warna
- Wasuli Kanda
- Mal Bigun
- Ron Soya
- Neela Samanali

== Filmography ==
His maiden cinematic experience came through a supportive role in 2008 film Hathara Denama Soorayo, which was a remake of the 1971 film by the same name directed by Neil Rupasinghe. Since then, he has acted in about 7 films, mostly in supportive characters.

Key
†	Denotes films that have not yet been released

Year	Film	Role	Ref.
2008	Hathara Denama Soorayo	Police Officer	
2010	Sara	Police Inspector	
2011	Selvam	Captain Migara	
2012	Midnight's Children	Pakistani Soldier	
2012	Wassane Senehasa	Chandana	
2018	Nidahase Piya DS	D.C.P. de Silva	
2019	Bhavatharana		
TBA	Saddha †		
TBA	Gagana †		

== Awards and Accolades ==
He has won several awards for the Best Actor, Supporting Actor and Popular Actor in many local television award festivals.

=== Sumathi Awards ===
Year	Nominee / work	Award	Result
2008	Vesak Sanda Ra	Jury Award	Won
2008	Suba Sihina Ahawarai	Best Upcoming Actor	Won
2009	through people's vote	Most Popular Actor	Won
2010	through people's vote	Most Popular Actor	Won
