= Eka Renaka Kurullo =

2019 Sinhala children's film

- Directed by: Benadick Manthrige
- Written by: Benadick Manthrige
- Starring: Cletus Mendis; Tharuka Wanniarachchi; Milinda Perera; Shashiranga Wickramasooriya
- Cinematography: Benadick Manthrige
- Edited by: Ravindra Lal; Sanjaya Kamal Manthrige
- Music by: Nimal Gunasekara; Nirosh Dissanayake
- Production company: UB Films
- Distributed by: LFD Theaters
- Release date: 3 August 2019
- Country: Sri Lanka
- Language: Sinhala

Eka Renaka Kurullo is a 2019 Sri Lankan Sinhala children's thriller film directed by Benadick Manthrige and produced by Udayanga Bandara for UB Films. It stars new cast of child actors Dulap Chamara, Sadipa Lakshani, Mark Devon and Pathum Blakshan in lead roles along with Cletus Mendis, Tharuka Wanniarachchi and Shashiranga Wickramasooriya in supportive roles. Music co-composed by Nimal Gunasekara and Nirosh Dissanayake.

The film was shot in and around Dambulla, Gampaha and Wattala areas. The film was released on 3 August 2019 in LFD cinemas.

== Cast ==
- Cletus Mendis as Police officer
- Sunil Liyanarachchi as Rajamanthri
- Milinda Perera as Racketeer
- Austin Samarawickrama
- Tharuka Wanniarachchi as School teacher
- Shashiranga Wickramasooriya as School teacher
- Priyangani Kekuluwela as Maali
- Udayangani Bandara
- Dayaratne Siriwardena
- Arjun Liyanage
- Lal Sarath Kumara as Farmer
- Pradeepa Pathirana
- Keerthi Ranjith Peiris

=== Child characters ===
- Dulap Chamara
- Sadipa Lakshani
- Mark Devon
- Pathum Blakshan

== Songs ==
The film consist with two songs.

No.	Title	Lyrics	Singer(s)	Length
1.	"Eka Rene Kurullo"	Nimal Gunasekara	Supun Chamika, Samith Sudantha Mantharige, Malik Menaka Piyaratne
2.	"O Maara Deiyange Puththu"	Camillus Perera	Hasmeen Gihan Gunasekera, Sunil Liyanarachchi
