= Parapura =

- Sinhala: පරපුර
- Directed by: Cletus Mendis
- Written by: Cletus Mendis; Srilal Priyadeva
- Based on: story by Cletus Mendis
- Produced by: Cletus Mendis; Basil Jayasuriya; Srimali Jayasuriya
- Starring: Jeevan Kumaratunga; Ravindra Randeniya, Ranjan Ramanayake, Sanath Gunathilake
- Cinematography: Lalith M. Thomas
- Edited by: Anusha Jayawardena, Ranuska Fernando
- Music by: Dinesh Subasinghe
- Distributed by: Risila Films
- Release date: 14 August 2014
- Country: Sri Lanka
- Language: Sinhala

Parapura (Sinhala: පරපුර) is a 2014 Sri Lankan Sinhalese action thriller film directed by Cletus Mendis and co-produced by Cletus Mendis himself with Basil Jayasuriya and Srimali Jayasuriya. It stars Jeevan Kumaratunga, Ravindra Randeniya and Sanath Gunathilake along with Ranjan Ramanayake, Nita Fernando and Buddhadasa Vithanarachchi. It is the 1,209th Sri Lankan film in the Sinhala cinema. It was the first acting role for Dilantha Mendis and Jeevan Kumaratunga's daughter, Malsha Kumaratunga.

== Cast ==
- Jeevan Kumaratunga as Suranimala; Madhawa, Kamal and Dilanga's father
- Ravindra Randeniya as a Parliament Minister Rajamanthri; A kind hearted minister who helped to people
- Sanath Gunathilake as Minister Marasinghe; A criticism minister who abducted Dilanga
- Ranjan Ramanayake as Madhawa; Suranimala's first son who is a boxer like his father
- Dilhani Ekanayake as Sudharma; Madhawa, Kamal and Dilanga's mother
- Dilanga Mendis as Dilanga aka Suduputha; Suranimala's third son who had a wizarding power
- Kanchana Mendis as Chethana; Madhava's girlfriend
- Nita Fernando as Kanthi; Dilanga's adopted mother
- Tennyson Cooray as Dilanga's friend
- Ajith Rajapaksha as Tyrone; The main villain who tried to kill Dilanga
- Buddhadasa Vithanarachchi as Chethana's father
- Kumara Thirimadura as Dilanga's adopted father
- Palitha Silva as a Police officer Sathyapala
- Chillie Thilanka as Musician Kamal aka Mahathun; Suranimala's second son who escaped from home to be a musician
- Dinesh Subasinghe as Music director
- Cletus Mendis as Senior Superintendent of Police (SSP)
- Wilson Karunaratne
- Denuwan Senadhi as Dilanga's friend
- Menaka Peries as Iresha
- Smanathi Lanaroul as Podi hamina
- Maureen Charuni as Chethana's mother
- Rajasinghe Loluwagoda as Photographer
- Malsha Kumaratunga
- Christeena Fernando
- Sarath Dikkumbura
