= Aloko Udapadi =

- Theatrical release poster
- Sinhala: ආලෝකෝ උදපාදි
- Directed by: Chathra Weeraman; Baratha Gihan Hettiarachchi
- Written by: Saman Weeraman
- Based on: Early chronicles
- Produced by: Thusitha Wijayasena
- Starring: Uddika Premarathna; Sammu Kashun; Dilhani Ekanayake; Nirosha Thalagala; Menaka Peiris; Roshan Ravindra
- Cinematography: Prabath Roshan
- Edited by: Shan Alwis
- Music by: Milinda Thennakone
- Production company: Art Movies
- Distributed by: EAP Cinema Circuit
- Release date: January 20, 2017
- Running time: 113 minutes
- Country: Sri Lanka
- Language: Sinhala
- Budget: 170 Million LKR

Aloko Udapadi (English: Light Arose; Sinhala: ආලෝකෝ උදපාදි; Pali: ආලෝකෝ උදපාදී) is a 2017 Sinhala epic historical film based on the story of King Valagamba of Anuradhapura (89 – 77 BCE). It was co-directed by Chathra Weeraman and Baratha Hettiarachchi produced by Thusitha Wijayasena for Art Movies. The screenplay was written by Saman Weeraman. The film stars Uddika Premarathna, Dilhani Ekanayake, Nirosha Thalagala, Menaka Peiris, Roshan Ravindra and Darshan Dharmaraj. It is the 1268th Sri Lankan film in the Sinhalese cinema.

Aloko Udapadi was released on 20 January 2017 in EAP Circuit Cinemas. The film was praised by the critics for its action sequences and the performances of the cast. It successfully passed 100 days in theatres as well.

== Plot ==
The film revolves around the story of the Buddha's dispensation in written form after long centuries of oral tradition in a turbulent historical context. King Valagamba was overthrown five months after his coronation by a rebellion and invasion from South India, but regained the throne after fourteen years by defeating the invaders.

Walagamba, the central character in the film, ascended to the throne in 103 BCE and was the fourth son of King Saddha Tissa, younger brother to King Dutugamunu. Walagamba became king at a time when the kingdom was under multiple threats. Walagamba's first period of rule was shattered in three months by Cholian invaders. The film recreates the efforts to preserve the sacred heritage of the Buddha's teaching and marks an important chapter in the development of the Buddhist faith.

== Cast ==
- Uddika Premarathna as King Walagamba
- Dilhani Ekanayake as Queen Consort Anula
- Nirosha Thalagala as Royal Consort Somadevi
- Sammu Kashun as Godaththa Thero
- Roshan Ravindra as Theeya Brahmin
- Menaka Peiris as Chola wife
- Mauli Maheesha as Prince Chulika
- Nayana Manujitha as Prince Mahanaga
- Dineth de Silva as Minister Uththiya
- Ajith Kumara as Minister Pabbatha
- Nihal Fernando as Pulahatta
- Kapila Sigera as Bahiya
- Dilip Manohara as Panya Mara
- Cletus Mendis as Pilaya Mara
- Darshan Dharmaraj as Dathika
- W. Jayasiri as Jain Nighantha Giri
- Buddhadasa Vithanarachchi as Chief monk Mahatissa
- Janak Premalal as Regional Sinhalese king
- Sammu Kasun as Godatta Thero
- Rajasinghe Loluwagoda as Chulasiva Thero
- Sirisena Pallewatte as Isidatta Thero
- Indika Madurage as Mahasona Thero
- Douglas Ranasinghe as Thanasiva
- Sunil Weerasinghe as Astrologist
- Nethalie Nanayakkara as Elderly mother

== Production ==
=== Filming ===
Shooting of the film began in Anuradhapura, Sri Lanka. Additional filming was scheduled in Kalpitiya and Teldeniya, a town in central province in Sri Lanka and lasted 62 days.

=== Development ===
For the first time in the Sri Lankan film-making, a concept called "production designing" has been introduced. This is in order to mix up every design aspect and to take them into a common ground. Inclusion of visual components was followed to create character profiles with determining their character elements. The film has four group of characters including king and the countrymen, Cholian Invaders, the Brahmins and Maha Sangha. This process is done to design character concepts.

=== Post-production ===
Chathra Weeraman personally supervised the film's visual effects. He studied visual effects and animation at the Multimedia University in Malaysia. Digital set extensions were used in filming palaces and battle camps in the film. 3D technology has been used in with photography and matte paintings. Computer-Generated Images (CGI) technology has been used in the film by VFX team. In color grading process of the film met some difficulties due to the lack of available technology in Sri Lanka. The director had to solve these difficulties from India specially colorization process.

== See also ==
- List of Asian historical drama films
