= Adarei Man =

- Sinhala: ආදරෙයි මං
- Directed by: Prageeth Rathnayake
- Written by: Prageeth Rathnayake
- Produced by: Romeo's Eye Picture
- Starring: Prageeth Rathnayake; Chathurika Pieris; Robin Fernando
- Cinematography: P. Upali Douglas Perera
- Edited by: Pravin Jayaratne
- Music by: Victor Rathnayake
- Distributed by: Rithma Theatres
- Release date: 18 January 2018
- Country: Sri Lanka
- Language: Sinhala

Adarei Man (Sinhala: ආදරෙයි මං) is a 2018 Sri Lankan Sinhala romance film directed by Prageeth Rathnayake as his maiden direction and produced by Jagath Chandana for Romeo's Eye Picture. It stars director Prageeth Rathnayake himself with Chathurika Pieris in lead roles along with Robin Fernando and Chamila Pieris. Music composed by veteran artist Victor Rathnayake.

The Muhurath ceremony of the film was celebrated at the Bellanvila Raja Maha Viharaya. Shooting was taken place around Colombo. The first screening was screened at Regal Theatre, Colombo. It is the 1294th Sri Lankan film in the Sinhala cinema.

== Plot ==
It is the love tale of a wealthy kind hearted boy named Pavan (played by Prageeth) and his relation with a middle-class girl Malmi (played by Chathurika). Their parents refuse their affair due to family status. With that, they married secretly with the help of friends.

== Cast ==
- Prageeth Rathnayake as Pavan
- Chathurika Pieris as Malmi
- Robin Fernando as Mr. S.W. Jayawardena, Pavan's father
- Chamila Pieris as Sakunthala
- Nadeeka Gunasekara
- Neil Allas as Malmi's father
- Nayana Rambukkanage as Malmi's mother
- Buddhika Indurugolla as Pavan's brother-in-law
- T. B. Ekanayake
- Sanju Rodrigo
- Vishaka Jayaweera

== Songs ==
No.	Title	Lyrics	Singer(s)	Length
1.	"Sithanna Thahanam Na"	Kumaradasa Saputhanthri	Victor Rathnayake
2.	"Thurulu Wee Lagin"	Wasantha Kumara Kobawaka	Victor Rathnayake & Uresha Ravihari
3.	"Neela Guwan Thale"	Geethnath Kudaligama	Victor Rathnayake & Uresha Ravihari
4.	"Oba Enna Mage Hiru"	Sunil Ariyaratne	Victor Rathnayake & Uresha Ravihari
5.	"Senehase Diya Isa"	Geethnath Kudaligama	Victor Rathnayake & Uresha Ravihari
6.	"Susum Kadulali Tharanaye"	Kularatne Ariyawansa	Victor Rathnayake & Uresha Ravihari
