= Sihinaya Dige Enna =

Sihinaya Dige Enna සිහිනය දිගේ එන්න
- Directed by: Chandrarathna Mapitigama
- Screenplay by: Chandrarathna Mapitigama
- Produced by: Samantha Ranasinghe
- Starring: Amila Abeysekara; Udari Warnakulasooriya; Sanath Gunathilake
- Cinematography: Buddika Mangala
- Edited by: Anusha Jayawardhana
- Music by: Dinesh Subasinghe
- Distributed by: Dilshan Home videos
- Release date: 22 June 2012
- Running time: 120 minutes
- Country: Sri Lanka
- Language: Sinhala/Tamil
- Budget: 11 million LKR

Sihinaya Dige Enna (Come along the dream) (Sinhala: සිහිනය දිගේ එන්න) is a 2012 Sri Lankan musical romantic film directed by Chandrarathne Mapitigama and produced by Samantha Ranasinghe. It stars Amila Abeysekara and Udari Warnakulasooriya in lead roles along with Sanath Gunathilake and Veena Jayakody. Music composed by Dinesh Subasinghe.

The film was released at Raja Cinema, Jaffna, which recorded as the first Sinhala film to be released in the region after 30 years. It is the 1175th Sri Lankan film in the Sinhala cinema.

== Plot ==
The heroine of the story Ridma (Udari) is a violinist, and Sangeeth (Amila) is a guitarist. Their romance is set against ethnic issues between the Sinhalese and Tamil people of Sri Lanka. The Ridma's adopted father Ayeshmantha (Sanath) is a politician and mayor of a city in the hill country. The Sangeeth's mother, Sakunthala (Veena), is a rich and noble woman from Colombo. Sakunthala goes to the hill country city seeking revenge on her former lover who deserted her 25 years ago. When the mayor finds that his daughter is in love with Sakunthala's son, he makes every effort to break up their romance. Sakunthala also attempts to break up the young couple since she knows that the mayor is her son's father. However, the mayor's wife reveals a secret which allows the young lovers to reunite and teaches a lesson in ethnic harmony.

== Cast ==
- Amila Abeysekara as Sangeeth
- Udari Warnakulasooriya as Ridma
- Sanath Gunathilake as Mayor Dushmantha Perera
- Veena Jayakody as Shanthi "Sakunthala" de Silva
- Nayana Kumari as Sunethra Elkaduwa
- Bandula Wijeweera as Music master Bandula
- Manel Wanaguru as Manel
- Rajitha Hiran as Hiran
- Saman Almeda as Saman
- Milinda Perera as Rohan
- Ravindra Mapitigama as Weerasinghe
- Rethika Kodithuwakku as Shaini
- Anura Srinath
- Jayasiri Weerathunge
- Chanchala Warnasooriya
- Himali Kapuge
- Ajith Dharmapriya
- Gihani Amarasena
- Suboodi Priyadarshani Karunarathne

== Background ==
Sihinaya Dige Enna was filmed in Bandarawela. Chandrarathna Mapitigama wrote the screenplay as well as directing the film. It was his fourth feature film, although he is a veteran director of many Sri Lankan teledramas. The film's premiere at the Raja Cinema in Jaffna marked the first time in 30 years that a film in Sinhalese with Tamil language subtitles was shown in the city.

== Music ==
The film's music director, Dinesh Subasinghe, had worked with director Chandrarathne Mapitigama on previous teledramas. He composed the score and also played the violin and guitar pieces which were mimed by the actor and actress playing the young lovers. The background music for the score, largely variations on the title song Sihinaya Dige Enna, was played by the Symphony Orchestra of Sri Lanka. The playback singers were Uresha Ravihari, Dumal Warnakulasuriya, and Kasun Primal. Uresha Ravihari sang the title song which has also been released as a single.

== Soundtrack ==
No.	Title	Lyrics	Singer(s)	Length
1.	"Sihinaya Dige Enna"	Chandrarathna Mapitigama	Dinesh Subasinghe ft Kasun Primal
2.	"Ape Sihine"	Chandrarathna Mapitigama	Uresha Ravihari, Kasun Primal
3.	"Sulagak Se Awidin"	Chandrarathna Mapitigama	Uresha Ravihari, Dumal Warnakulasuriya

== See also ==
- Cinema of Sri Lanka
