= Sumathi Best Teledrama Actor Award =

Award for best Sri Lankan actor in TV show by Sumathi Group

The Sumathi Best Teledrama Actor Award is presented annually in Sri Lanka by the Sumathi Group of Campany associated with many commercial brands for the best Sri Lankan actor of the year in television screen.

The award was first given in 1995. Following is a list of the winners of this prestigious title since then.

== Award winners ==
Year	Best Actor	Teledrama	Ref.
1995	Buddhadasa Vithanarachchi	Dandubasnamanaya	
1996	Lucky Dias	Sankranthi Samaya	
1997	Jackson Anthony	Pitagamkarayo	
1998	Asoka Peiris	Chala Achala	
1999	Suminda Sirisena	Nisala Wila	
2000	Joe Abeywickrama	Imadiya Mankada	
2001	Sriyantha Mendis	Sanda Amawakai	
2002	Jayalath Manoratne	Sanda Amawakai	
2003	Mahendra Perera	Hada Wila Sakmana	
2004	Suminda Sirisena	Ramya Suramya	
2006	Jayalal Rohana	Isuru Yogaya	
2007	Janak Premalal	Katu Imbula	
2008	Roger Seneviratne	Wanabime Sirakaruwa	
2009	Sriyantha Mendis	Sathgunakaraya	
2010	Sriyantha Mendis	Sadisi Tharanaya	
2011	Roshan Ravindra	Abarthu Atha	
2012	Jagath Chamila	Swayanjatha	
2013	Wishwajith Gunasekara	Me Wasantha Kalayay	
2014	Jackson Anthony	Appachchi	
2015	Janak Premalal	Girikula	
2016	Sriyantha Mendis	Vishnu Sankranthiya	
2017	Sumith Rathnayake	Maddahana	
2018	Shyam Fernando	See Raja	
2019	Uddika Premarathna	Minigandela	
2021	Roshan Ravindra	Weeraya Gedara Awith	
