= Chula Padmendra Kumarapathirana =

Sri Lankan actress, model

- Born: Chulpadmendra Kumarapathirana; 20th century
- Died: August 30, 2026
- Occupation: Model

Chula Padmendra Kumarapathirana (Sinhala: චූලා පද්මේන්ද්‍ර කුමාරපතිරණ) was a Sri Lankan actress, model and a fashion trainer. In 2006, she won the International Media Award at the "Miss Tourism Model of the World" competition held in Tanzania.

== Personal life ==
Chula was arrested, alongside Caroline Jurie, after she allegedly injured a fellow beauty queen during an on-stage altercation in 2021. She was later released on bail.

== Acting career ==
1. Wahinna Muthu Wessak
2. Gindari 2 (Asani Vasi)
3. Swara (Notes) (2023)

== Death ==
Chula Padmendra died on 30 August 2026 at the age of 46.

== See also ==
- List of Sri Lankan actors
