= Daskon =

- Promotional image
- Also known as: Daskon Hewath Kanda Uda Gindara
- දස්කොන්
- Genre: Historical; Romance; Political
- Written by: Jackson Anthony
- Directed by: Jackson Anthony
- Starring: Roshan Ravindra; Pooja Umashankar; Akhila Dhanuddhara
- Theme music composer: Samantha Perera
- Country of origin: Sri Lanka
- Original language: Sinhala
- No. of episodes: 72

Production
- Editor: Himal Dharmarathna
- Running time: Approximately 22 min.
- Production company: Helanka Creation

Original release
- Network: EAP Broadcasting Company
- Release: September 6, 2014 – July 5, 2015

Daskon (Sinhala: දස්කොන් හෙවත් කන්ද උඩ ගින්දර; lit. Daskon, the Fire of Kandy; also known as Daskon Hewath Kanda Uda Gindara) is a Sri Lankan drama starring Roshan Ravindra as the titular character Daskon, Pooja Umashankar and Akila Dhanuddhara. Directed and written by Jackson Anthony, this historical drama depicts the legendary romance between Queen Pramila, the queen consort of king Vira Parackrama Narendrasinghe and Minister Daskon. It aired on Swarnavahini every Saturday and Sunday at 20:30 (SLST) from September 6, 2014 to July 5, 2015.

== Synopsis ==
About the tragic love story between real life Daskon (Pedro de Gascoyn), the chief minister of king Vira Parackrama Narendrasinghe and the king’s queen consort Sumitra (Pramila Devi). Vira Parackrama Narendrasinghe was the last king of Kandy with Sinhalese origin. The story flows through various power struggles and conspiracies in the court.

== Cast ==
- Roshan Ravindra as Daskon
- Pooja Umashankar as Queen Pramila
- Akila Dhanuddhara as King Vira Parackrama Narendrasinghe
- Menaka Pieris as Monaravila Kumarihami
- Gihan Fernando as Pattiya Bandara
- Dinusha Rajapathirana as Kiribakini
- Awanthi Aponsu as dowager queen mother
- Kusum Renu as Abhirami Devi
- Ruwan Perera as Suragune
- Srimal Wedisinghe as Pitti Nayakkar
- Roshan Pilapitiya ad Levke Nilame
- Sathischandra Edirisinghe as Mahadikaram
- Buddhadasa Vithanarachchi as Yalegoda Adikaram
- Chandika Nanayakkara
- Lucien Bulathsinhala as Keppetipola Nilame
- Hyacinth Wijeratne as Kirawelle Kumarihami
- Kumari Munasinghe as MahaKumarihami
- Richard Abeywardena as Kiriwavule Rala

== Awards and nominations ==
Year	Award	Category	Recipient	Result
2016	Sumathi Awards	Best Upcoming Teledrama Actor	Ruwan Perera	Won
2016	Sumathi Awards	Best Upcoming Teledrama Actress	Dinusha Rajapathirana	Won
2016	Sumathi Awards	Best Teledrama - Director	Jackson Anthony	Won
2016	Sumathi Awards	Best Teledrama - Art Director	Dhammika Hewadunna	Won
2016	Sumathi Awards	Best Teledrama - Series	Daskon	Won
2016	Sumathi Awards	Best Teledrama - Cameraman	Dhammika Rathnayake	Won
2016	Sumathi Awards	Best Teledrama - Editor	Thiwanka Udagedara	Won
2016	Sumathi Awards	Best Teledrama Makeup	Harsha Manjula	Won
2016	Sumathi Awards	Best Teledrama – Music Director	Samantha Perera	Won
2016	Sumathi Awards	Best Teledrama Script	Jackson Anthony	Won
2016	Sumathi Awards	Best Television Lyrics	Jackson Anthony	Won
2016	Sumathi Awards	Best Teledrama Singer	Indika Upamali	Won
2016	Raigam Tele’es Awards	Excellence Award, Art Director	Dhammika Hewadunna	Won
2016	Raigam Tele’es Awards	Excellence Award, Music Director	Samantha Perera	Won
2016	Raigam Tele’es Awards	Excellence Award, Best Singer Male	Asanka Dhananjaya	Won
2016	Raigam Tele’es Awards	Excellence Award, Best Singer Female	Indika Upamali	Won
2016	Raigam Tele’es Awards	Upcoming Actor	Ruwan Perera	Won
2016	Raigam Tele’es Awards	Upcoming Actress	Madhavi Wathsala	Won
2016	Raigam Tele’es Awards	Excellence Award, Editor	Himal Dharmaratne	Won
2016	Raigam Tele’es Awards	Excellence Award, Supporting Actor	Gihan Perera	Won
2016	Raigam Tele’es Awards	Excellence Award, Screenplay	Jackson Anthony	Won
2016	Raigam Tele’es Awards	Excellence Award, Actor	Roshan Ravindra	Won
2016	Raigam Tele’es Awards	Excellence Award, Director	Jackson Anthony	Won
2016	Raigam Tele’es Awards	Excellence Award, Drama	Daskon	Won
