= Viyapath Bambara =

- Sinhala: වියපත් බඹරා
- Directed by: Prasad De Silva
- Written by: Ranjith Jayasuriya
- Produced by: Rupun Films
- Starring: Anura Dharmasiriwardena; Uthpala Gunatileke; Rupun Ranadheera
- Cinematography: Sujith Nishantha
- Edited by: Pravin Jayaratne
- Music by: Sarath de Alwis
- Release date: 3 December 2010
- Running time: 120 minutes
- Country: Sri Lanka
- Language: Sinhala

Viyapath Bambara (Sinhala: වියපත් බඹරා) is a 2010 Sri Lankan Sinhala adult thriller film directed by Prasad De Silva and produced by Gayan Ranadheera for Rupran Films. It stars Anura Dharmasiriwardena and Uthpala Gunatileke in lead roles along with Rupun Ranadheera and Cletus Mendis. Music composed by Sarath de Alwis. It is the 1148th Sri Lankan film in the Sinhala cinema.

== Cast ==
- Anura Dharmasiriwardena
- Uthpala Gunatileke
- Rupun Ranadheera
- Cletus Mendis
- Nandana Hettiarachchi
- Manel Wanaguru
- Nadeeka Gunasekara
- Daya Thennakoon
- Grace Ariyawimal
- Thanuja Dilhani
- Danushka Iroshini
