= Aadaraneeya Wassaanaya =

Adaraneeya Wassanaya
- ආදරණීය වස්සානය
- Directed by: Senesh Dissanayake Bandara
- Screenplay by: Nimmie Hathiyaldeniya, Senesh Dissanaike Bandara
- Based on: Wassana Sihinaya by Upul Shantha Sannasgala
- Produced by: Tomorrow Films Today
- Starring: Roshan Ravindra; Chathurika Pieris; Sachini Ayendra Stanley; Malini Fonseka; Pradeep Senanayake
- Edited by: Isuru Sanjaya Thienudies
- Music by: Nawaratne Gamage
- Production company: Tomorrow Films Today Private Limited
- Release date: May 28, 2004
- Running time: 132 minutes
- Country: Sri Lanka
- Language: Sinhala

Adaraneeya Wassanaya (transl. The Romantic Rainy Season) is a 2004 Sri Lankan romantic musical film directed by Senesh Dissanayake Bandara. It is produced along with Bandula Weerackody co-produced for Telestar Private Limited and produced by Vinod Arosha, Piyal Lokugamage, Nalin Aponsu, Nihal Seneviratne Epa, Lalith Mirihagalle and Nimal Ekanayake for Tomorrow Films Today Private Limited. It stars Roshan Ravindra and Chathurika Pieris in lead roles along with Sachini Ayendra Stanley and Malini Fonseka. Music composed by Nawaratne Gamage.

== Production ==
The film is Bandara's directorial debut. It tells the story of a middle-class boy from the highlands who falls in love with an upper-class girl in Colombo. They are both high school students. The girl's arranged marriage and her illness make life difficult for the young couple. They challenge cultural conventions to succeed. The film is based on Wassana Sihinaya, a novel by Upul Shantha Sannasgala.

== Plot ==
Kasun Bandara Seneviratne (Roshan Ravindra) accidentally sets fire to his rented room, trying to get over the painful memories of his girlfriend, Chapa Gangadarie Abeynaike (Chathurika Pieris) after he receives news that she has been raped by her husband to be. Kasun, a country boy and Chapa meet at school. Chapa is a singer and Kasun is artistic.

Chapa has been unwell for years. it is arranged she should marry Rohan, her cousin. Rohan tries to rape her a number of times. Chapa, whose parents are employed abroad, finds affection, security, and empathy in Kasun. When Kasun tries to protect Chapa, he is beaten by Rohan. Chapa’s mother risks her only daughter’s life for Rohan’s money and denies Kasun who falls into poverty in Colombo.

Two years later, Kasun is visited by Madhupani (Sachini Ayendra) Kasun is Madhupani's language tutor. Madhupani loves Kasun, but Kasun does not reciprocate.

Chapa’s mother changes her mind and wants Kasun to save Chapa. Kasun and his friends try to do this.

== Cast ==
- Roshan Ravindra as Kasun Bandara Seneviratne'
- Chathurika Pieris as Chapa Gangadarie Abeynaike
- Sachini Ayendra Stanley as Madhupani
- Malini Fonseka
- Pradeep Senanayake
- Rajitha Hiran
- Sahan Ranwala as Niranga

== Film crew ==
- Senesh Dissanayake Bandara – director
- Nimmie Hathiyaldeniya – screenplay
- Senesh Dissanayake Bandara – screenplay
- Nawaratne Gamage – music
- Ashoka Jayasekera – director of photography
- Anura Sri Wasantha Kumara – lighting director
- Lal Harindranath – art director
- Guna Sri Uhanowita – makeup
- Chaani Perera – costume designer
- Iresha Kodituwakku – hair designer
- Chandana Wickremesinghe – choreographer
- Nimmie Hathiyaldeniya – assistant director
- Deepal Guneratne – production manager
- Isuru Sanjaya Thienudies – editor
- Vinod Arosha, Piyal Lokugamage, Lalith Mirihagalle, Nalin Aponsu, Anura Sri Wasantha Kumara, Asoka Jayasekere, Nawaratne Gamage, Nihal Seneviratne Epa, Nimal Ekanayake, Donald Jayantha Perera, Ranjith Dahanayake, Varuni Pieris, Nimmie Hathiyaldeniya, Senesh Dissanayake Bandara – producers
