= Amila Abeysekara =

Sri Lankan actor, singer and presenter

Amila Abeysekara අමිල අබේසේකර
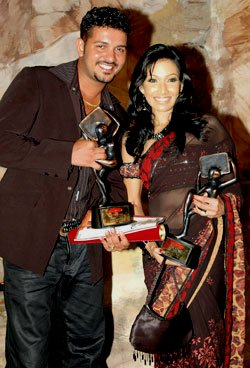
- Amila & Nehara Peiris with Raigam Tele'es Awards
- Born: 7 March 1983 (age 43); Kandy, Sri Lanka
- Education: Dharmaraja College; President's College, Maharagama
- Occupations: Actor, singer, TV Host
- Years active: 1998–present
- Spouse: Theja Jayawardena (m. 2010)

Amila Sampath Abeysekara (born 7 March 1983: අමිල අබේසේකර), is an actor in Sri Lankan cinema and television. Mostly engaged in television, Abeysakara is best known for the role Amantha in the serial Paba, where he won the most popular actor award in 2009. He has also hosted four seasons in the reality show Derana Dream Star.

== Personal life ==
Amila Abeysekara was born in Kandy. At the age of 10, they moved to Maharagama. He has two younger brothers. He started to education from Dharmaraja College, Kandy, and then moved to President's College, Maharagama. He played cricket in school times, where he continued to play for clubs before entering to acting. He is married to longtime partner Theja Jayawardena. The wedding was celebrated in 2010, however wedding was registered in 2004. She is currently working as a flight attendant in the airline Emirates.

== Career ==
In 1998, Abeysekara got the opportunity as an arbitrator at Swarnavahini. He started acting career in 2000 with the blockbuster serial Depath Nai. His maiden cinema acting came through 2008 film Hathara Denama Soorayo which is a remake of 1971 blockbuster of the same name directed by Neil Rupasinghe. He played the character Linton in that movie as a supportive role. In 2012, he acted in Sihinaya Dige Enna as the lead actor.

He hosted the musical program Rhythm Chat telecast on Jathika Rupavahini.

=== Selected television serials ===
- Adaraneeya Chanchala
- Adara Wassa
- Aththai Me Adare
- Depath Nai
- Diriya Doni
- Ektam Ge
- Giri Shikara Meda
- Googly
- Mini Muthu
- Muthu Palasa
- Nethaka Maayavee
- Night Learners
- Paba
- Pini Wassak
- Ridi Pahan
- Sanda Eliya
- Sasara Seya
- Sathweni Dawasa
- Saveena
- Senehasa Kaviyak
- Sihinayak Paata Paatin
- Sith Bindi Rekha
- Situ Gedara
- Sonduru Dadayakkaraya
- Susumaka Ima
- Thurumpu Asiya
- Wasanthaya Aran Evith
- Wassa Numba Wagei

== Filmography ==
Year	Film	Roles	Ref.
2008	Hathara Denama Soorayo remake	Linton	
2011	Suseema		
2012	Sihinaya Dige Enna	Sangeeth	

== Awards ==
=== Raigam Tele'es ===
Year	Nominee / work	Award	Result
2009	Paba	Most Popular Actor	Won
