= Nidi Yahana Kelabei =

- Sinhala: නිදි යහන කැලඹෙයි
- Directed by: Sudesh Wasantha Peiris
- Written by: Louie Vanderstraeten
- Produced by: Sunil T. Films
- Starring: Robin Fernando; Nadeeka Gunasekara; Rex Kodippili
- Cinematography: Gamini Moragollagama
- Edited by: Kumarasiri de Silva
- Music by: Keshan Perera
- Distributed by: CEL Theatres
- Release date: 4 March 2011
- Country: Sri Lanka
- Language: Sinhala

Nidi Yahana Kelabei (Sinhala: නිදි යහන කැලඹෙයි) is a 2011 Sri Lankan Sinhala adult drama film directed by Sudesh Wasantha Peiris and produced by Sunil T. Fernando for Sunil T. Films. It stars Robin Fernando and Nadeeka Gunasekara in lead roles along with Rex Kodippili and Sandun Wijesiri. It is the 1153rd Sri Lankan film in the Sinhala cinema.

== Cast ==
- Robin Fernando
- Rex Kodippili
- Nadeeka Gunasekara
- Sandun Wijesiri
- Sahan Wijesinghe
- Premadasa Vithanage
- Susantha Chandramali
- Nishani Gamage
- Ranruwan Kumaratunga

== Soundtrack ==
No.	Title	Singer(s)	Length
1.	"Mal Mal Wage Inna"	Lanthra Perera, Suranji Shyamali
2.	"Saragi Mandahase"	Suranji Shyamali, Danush Wijetunga
3.	"Hithuwada Yanne Kohe"	Jeewani Nirupa Perera
