= Kanchana Mendis =

Sri Lankan actress and model

Kanchana Mendis කාංචනා මෙන්ඩිස්
- Born: 24 June 1980 (age 45); Negambo, Sri Lanka
- Occupations: Actress, model
- Years active: 2000–present
- Spouse: Roshan Ranawaka (m. 2009)
- Children: 3
- Awards: Best Actress; Most Popular Actress

Kanchana Mendis (born June 24, 1980 as කාංචනා මෙන්ඩිස්) [Sinhala]) is an actress in Sri Lankan cinema, stage drama, and television. She is best known for her roles in movies Rajaya Sewaya Pinisai, Rosa Wasanthe, and television serials Damini and Sakman Maluwa.

== Personal life ==
Her father died when she was two years old. She was married to Roshan Ranawaka in 2009. The couple has two sons, Senitha Ryan, Nirvana Rayyon and one daughter, Keisha Ryleigh. She currently lives in the United Kingdom with her family.

== Career ==
She became popular with the television advertisement Ninja Mosquito Coil, along with Sanath Wimalasiri and Nimanthi Porage, in 1998. She acted in the television serial Suba Anagathayak at the age of 12, directed by Dharmasena Pathiraja. She entered the mainstream film industry through the 2000 Sinhala film Rajaya Sewaya Pinisai, directed by Udayakantha Warnasuriya, with the character of a private secretary, "Prabashwari". She has also appeared in a Tamil film named Varnajalam, where the main roles were done by Sadha and Srikanth, as well as in Kanagalal Kai Rasi. She also acted in a few stage dramas such as Dharma Sangramaya by Saman Thushara and Ananga Bambaru by Richard Manawadu.

In 2003, Mendis was chosen as a "brand ambassador" for the special 40th anniversary lottery ticket from the Sri Lankan National Lotteries Board. During the same year, she won the Sumathi Tele award at Artscope for Most Popular Actress.

=== Selected television serials ===
- Akaradaruwa
- Ambu Daruwo
- Apooru Soladaduwa
- Athma Senehasa
- Bharyawo
- Bindena Benduma
- Bopath Sakkiya
- Dahas Gawdura
- Damini
- Dath Kekulu Pala
- Derana
- Deyyinge Kamaththa
- Doo Daruwo
- Fantasy Avenue
- Girikula
- Guru Geethaya
- Hemanthaye Wasanthayak
- Indrachapa
- Isuruyogaya
- Kinduru Nadiya
- Kulawanthayo
- Mahagedara
- Mahathala Hatana
- Makaranda
- Mal Ethana
- Maya Mansala
- Me Wasantha Kaalayai
- Monaravila
- Nadeeladiya
- Nethaka Maayavee
- Pathini
- Pinibara Yamaya
- Ridi Duvili
- Sakman Maluwa
- Sanda Hiru Tharu
- Sandakada Thanna
- Sandaliya
- Sanda Maddahana
- Sanduni
- Sasandara
- Sathipooja
- Sawsiri Uyana
- Sihina Wasanthayak
- Sinansenna Anuththara
- Siri Dev Bawana
- Suba Anagathayak
- Sudu Mal Kanda
- Sujatha
- Suralova
- Therani Geethaya
- Wassanaye Hiru Evidin

== Awards ==
She has won several awards at local film festivals and television festivals. In 2000, she won the award for Best Supporting Actress in the debut movie Rajaya Sevaya Pinisai at the Presidential Awards. In 2001, she won a merit award for the role in Rosa Wasanthe at the Sarasaviya Film Festival.

=== Presidential Film Awards ===
Year	Nominee / work	Award	Result
2000	Rajaya Sevaya Pinisai	Best Supporting Actress	Won

=== Sarasaviya Awards ===
Year	Nominee / work	Award	Result
2001	Rosa Wasanthe	Merit Award	Won

=== Sumathi Awards ===
Year	Nominee / work	Award	Result
2003		Most Popular Actress	Won
2013	Me Wasantha Kaalayai	Best Actress	Won
2015	Girikula	Best Actress	Nominated

=== Raigam Tele'es ===
Year	Nominee / work	Award	Result
2012	Me Wasantha Kaalayai	Best Actress	Won
2015	Girikula	Best Actress	Nominated

== Filmography ==
Year	Film	Character	Notes	Ref.
2000	Rajya Sevaya Pinisai	Prabashwari	Won Presidential Award	
2001	Rosa Wasanthe	Hansamali		
2002	Sudu Sewaneli			
2003	Sakman Maluwa	Prema	Leading female role	
2003	Pura Sakmana			
2003	One Shot	Vishaka		
2004	Varnajalam	Viji	Tamil film	
2006	Samaara	Indu		
2007	Nisala Gira	Asela		
2008	Superstar			
2008	Hathara Denama Surayo remake	Soma		
2008	Heart FM	Mandakini		
2011	Sinhawalokanaya	Shenali		
2011	Samanala Uyana			
2014	Parapura	Chethana		
2017	Sooriya			
2021	Wassane Sihinaya			
