= Uppalawanna =

2007 film by Sunil Ariyaratne

Uppalawanna උප්පලවන්ණා
- Directed by: Sunil Ariyaratne
- Written by: Tissa Abeysekara
- Produced by: Sumathi Films
- Starring: Sangeetha Weeraratne; Malini Fonseka; Roshan Ravindra
- Cinematography: Suminda Weerasinghe
- Edited by: Rangana Sinharage
- Music by: Navaratne Gamage
- Production companies: Prasad Color Lab, Chennai
- Distributed by: CEL Theaters
- Release date: 27 July 2007
- Country: Sri Lanka
- Language: Sinhala

Uppalawanna (Sinhala: උප්පලවන්ණා) is a 2007 Sri Lankan Sinhala drama philosophical film directed by Sunil Ariyaratne and produced by Milinia Sumathipala for Sumathi Films. It stars Sangeetha Weeraratne and Malini Fonseka in lead roles along with Roshan Ravindra and Chandani Seneviratne. Music composed by Navaratne Gamage. It is the 1165th Sri Lankan film in the Sinhala cinema. The film has been shot in and around Thanthirimale.

== Plot ==
Set during the 1987–89 JVP insurrection, Ratnapala (Jagath), a student at the University of Colombo and former member of the JVP, comes to visit his mother in Anuradhapura. He is killed by a former comrade (Roshan) on the basis of leaking JVP secrets to the Sri Lankan government. The comrade sustains serious injuries from this encounter.

The comrade runs from the scene, attempting to make his way back to his base camp. Instead, he ends up near the Anuradhapura nunnery. Uppalavanna (Sangeetha) comes across him and after much deliberation, decides to heal him. Throughout the days she spends helping him, she reflects back on her time as Upuli, a laywoman.

Upuli, the daughter of an Ayurvedic doctor (Suminda), fell in love with her dance teacher's son. They eloped, which caused her mother much pain and eventually, a premature death. Upuli and her husband go to the funeral, and there, her father shoots him dead. Her father goes to jail, and Upali explains to him that she wants to repent for all of their sins by joining the nunnery.

This reflection coupled with her secret assistance changes how Uppalavanna acts. The chief nun (Malini) senses this, warning Upallavanna with her namesake's story.

Eventually, the villagers find the assassin and take him away to kill him. Learning that he received medication from the nunnery, the villagers refuse to offer alms to the nunnery. Accepting the guilt unto herself and establishing the innocence of the other nuns, the film ends with Uppalavanna leaving the nunnery carrying only her alms-bowl.

== Cast and characters ==
- Sangeetha Weeraratne as Uppalavanna / Upuli
- Suminda Sirisena as Father
- Rohana Beddage as Dance teacher
- Roshan Ravindra as Rebel
- Jagath Chamila as Rathnapala
- Malini Fonseka as Chief of the Nuns
- Sandali Walikanna as Nanduththara Podi Aththi
- Chandani Seneviratne as Rathnapala's mother
- Chithra Warakagoda as Upuli's mother
- Sanath Wimalasiri as Upuli's boyfriend
- Vasantha Vittachchi as Police Inspector
- Sanjeewa Upendra as Chief monk
- Suminda Sirisena as Weda Mahaththaya

== Reception ==
=== Critics ===
The movie was met with primarily negative reviews. Many criticized the various unnecessary characters in the movie which do not have any role in the plot, the editing, and the acting. Sangeetha's performance was panned by some critics. The website Sri Lankan Film Critics, gave her extremely negative reviews. Indeewara Thilakarathne and Ranga Chandrarathne commented on Malini Fonseka's inauthentic portrayal of the chief nun.

Indeewara Thilakarathne and Ranga Chandrarathne criticized the similarities of the movie with other movies which shared a similar theme like Water and Sankaran. They said -"Although one may not be able to pinpoint that the film has copied or rather adapted some scenes from Water or Sankara, it is doubtful whether the film maker had attempted to adapt some elements of Water in a Buddhist milieu. Especially the character of Podi Atthi remind the viewers of Chuiya in Water though it is not as lively as Chuiya.

The script and cinematography were highly praised by the critics. They said that these factors shed light to the film. Navaratne Gamage's music, Suminda Weerasinghe's cinematography and Nanda Malini's singing made a meaningful contribution to the film. Dr. Praneeth Abeyasundera with his melodious wording has attempted to capture the spirit of the tone of Buddhist chanting.

=== Commercial ===
Uppalavanna did fairly at the box office. Uppalavanna recorded the best returns in three years, during the first two weeks. The film reached a record run with 175,000 patrons with over Rs. 12.6 million collection island wide within first 27 days of screening. From 83 days of successful screening, the film earned Rs. 31.5 million island wide.

== Awards ==
=== Sarasaviya Awards 2007 ===
- Most Popular Actress - Sangeetha Weeraratne
- Best Actress - Sangeetha Weeraratne
- Best Supporting Actress - Chandani Senewiratne
- Best Music - Navaratne Gamage
