= Janak Premalal =

Sri Lankan actor (born 1959)

Janak Premalal ජනක් ප්‍රේමලාල්
- Born: May 15, 1959 (age 67); Karannagoda
- Education: Horana Sripalee College; Vidyaratne College, Horana
- Alma mater: University of Sri Jayewardenepura
- Occupations: Actor, dramatist, director, teacher
- Years active: 1983–present
- Political party: National Freedom Front
- Awards: Best Actor

Lokupathirage Janak Premalal (born May 15, 1959, as ජනක් ප්‍රේමලාල්) [Sinhala]), is an actor in Sri Lankan cinema, stage drama and television. He has acted in more than 250 television serials.

== Early life ==
He was born on May 15, 1959, in Karannagoda. His father Sirisena Premalal is a script writer and a teacher at Govinna Senior School in 1952. His mother Daya Weerakkody was also a teacher who worked in Govinna Primary School. He first attended Govinna Primary School and then Horana Sripali Vidyalaya. Then he went to Vidyarathana College, Horana, for education since grade 8. He has one brother who is an army officer.

Premalal completed A/L from the commerce stream and was selected to the Faculty of Commerce at the University of Sri Jayewardenepura. He completed a degree in Property Administration & Valuation Science. In 1982, he was appointed as a valuation officer at the Department of Assessments and Taxation. In 1984, he joined as an economics teacher in his school Vidyarathana College, Horana. He continued to work in the profession for thirty years until his retirement in 2014.

He is married to his longtime partner Gnanothra. The couple has one daughter, Sasikala and one son, Gayanjith. Gayanjith is an IT graduate at University of Moratuwa. Sasikala is a chemistry graduate at University of Peradeniya.

== Acting career ==
While in the school at the age of 18, Premalal started their drama career by acting in the stage play Kathawak Athara Hadiyak produced by Ariyapala Pathirajha. In 1976, the play won first place at All Island Drama Competition as well. His television drama career started with a minor role in the serial Hathpana and then with Siw Mansala. His first main role in television came through 1993 serial Sandagiri Pawwa. His maiden cinema acting came through 1993 film Guru Gedara directed by Vijaya Darma Sri with a minor uncredited role.

=== Selected stage dramas ===
- Kathawak Athara Hadiyak
- Ambu Samiyo
- Mahagiri Dambaya
- Numba Vitharak Thala Elalui

=== Selected television serials ===
- Aadaraneeya Poornima
- Ado
- Aeya
- Ammai Thaththai
- Ape Adare
- Api Api Wage I
- Api Api Wage II
- Arundathi
- Athma Senehasa
- Bogala Sawundiris
- Bonda Meedum
- Bopath Ella
- Damsari
- Deva Daruwo
- Dhawala Kadulla
- Dhawala Yamaya
- Diya Matha Ruwa
- Doo Kumariyo
- Dumriya Andaraya
- Eka Iththaka Mal
- Girikula
- Golu Thaththa
- Guru Geethaya
- Haaratha Hera
- Hathpana
- Hima Kumari
- Hiru Kumari
- Hiru Kumaru Adare Genalla
- Hirusanda Maima
- Hoduwawa
- Idora Wassa
- Isisara Isawwa
- Issarahata Yanna
- Isuru Pawura
- Iththo
- Jeewithaya Lassanai
- Kapa Nasna Samaya
- Karuwala Gedara
- Katu Imbula
- Kinduru Kumariya
- Kulawamiya
- Law nam Law
- Mathi Nethi Daa
- Mayarajini
- Mayaratne
- Monaravila
- Nedeyo
- Neela Pabalu
- Nisala Vilthera
- Oba Mageya
- Pawani
- Pembara Maw Sanda
- Piththala Konderuma
- Ran Poruwa
- Ran Samanalayo
- Ranthili Wewa
- Rathriya
- Ridee Ittankaraya
- Rupantharaya
- Ruwan Sakmana
- Sadisi Tharanaya
- Salmal Landa
- Sanda Diya Mankada
- Sandagiri Pawwa
- Sanda Nodutu Sanda
- Sanda Thaniyama
- Sandu Pama
- Sathara Ima Gini
- Saveena
- Senakeliyay Maya
- Senehasa Kaviyak neela pabalu
- Sidu
- Senuri
- Sikuru Udanaya
- Siri Dev Bawana
- Siw Mansala
- Sooriya Daruwo
- Subha Prarthana
- Suwanda Padma
- Swarnapali
- Swayanjatha
- Theth Saha Viyali
- Thum Path Rela
- Uthuwankande Sura Saradiel
- Veedi Pahan
- Vinivindimi
- Walakulu

== Beyond acting ==
In 1984, he directed his first stage play Abuddassa Kolama, which won many awards at Youth Drama Festival. Then in 1988, he directed the stage play Raja Kapuru and Rajagahe Nadagama in 2000. In 2004, he directed the play Salwala Kelabila. Raja Kapuru was also staged in Japan.

In 1984, Abuddassa Kolama won seven awards at the All Island Drama Competition conducted by the National Youth Services Council. And in 1988, Raja Kapuru won three awards at All Island Drama Competition.

== Filmography ==
Year	Film	Role	Ref.
1993	Guru Gedara	Funeral and Wedding Attender	
1999	Bahu Bharya		
2000	Indrakeelaya		
2002	Salelu Warama	Suren's brother	
2010	Suwanda Denuna Jeewithe	Ravi's father	
2012	Wassanaye Senehasa	Samarasekara	
2017	Aloko Udapadi	Regional Sinhala King	
2017	Kaala	Heen Kurutta's brother	
2018	Nidahase Piya DS	E. W. Perera	
2020	Suparna	Mastor	
2020	Nim Him		
2023	Thattu Deke Iskole		
TBD	Thanapathilage Gedara		

== Awards and accolades ==
He won the Best actor award in for the role in television serial Swayanjatha. In 2006, he won two Best Actor awards for the role in Katu Imbula at Raigam Tele'es and Sumathi Awards. Then in 2008, he won the award for the Best Actor for Kaluwara Gedara at SIGNIS awards and Raigam Tele'es.

=== Raigam Tele'es ===
Year	Nominee / work	Award	Result
2001	Swayanjatha	Best Actor	Won
2006	Katu Imbula	Best Actor	Won
2008	Karuwala Gedara	Best Actor	Won

=== Sumathi Awards ===
Year	Nominee / work	Award	Result
2006	Katu Imbula	Best Actor	Won
2015	Girikula	Best Actor	Won

=== SIGNIS Awards ===
Year	Nominee / work	Award	Result
2008	Karuwala Gedara	Best Actor	Won

=== State Drama Festival ===
Year	Nominee / work	Award	Result
2012	Swayanjatha	Best Actor	Won
