= Bhavatharana =

- Sinhala: භවතරණ
- Directed by: Devinda Kongahage
- Written by: Devinda Kongahage
- Produced by: Rajaputra Weerasinghe; Shirani Keppetipola
- Starring: Malini Fonseka; Sajeew Rajaputra; Sriyantha Mendis; Mahendra Perera
- Cinematography: Nishantha Pradeep
- Edited by: Praveen Jayaratne
- Music by: Navaratne Gamage; Jagath Wickramasinghe.
- Distributed by: Ridma Theatres
- Release date: 3 December 2021
- Country: Sri Lanka
- Language: Sinhala

Bhavatharana (Sinhala: භවතරණ) is a 2021 Sri Lankan Sinhala historical drama film directed by Devinda Kongahage as his film directorial debut. The film is co-produced by Mawathagama S. Rajaputra Weerasinghe with Shirani Keppetipola for Castoria Films and Rajaputhra Productions. It stars Malini Fonseka and newcomer Sajeew Rajaputra in lead roles whereas Sriyantha Mendis, Mahendra Perera, Udayanthi Kulatunga, Roshan Pilapitiya, Roshan Ravindra, and Chandika Nanayakkara made supportive roles.

== Plot ==
The film is based on the political and cultural events of King Keerthi Sri Rajasinghe and his reign.

== Cast ==
- Malini Fonseka
- Sajeew Rajaputra as Pulasthi
- Sriyantha Mendis
- Mahendra Perera
- Udayanthi Kulatunga
- Roshan Pilapitiya
- Roshan Ravindra
- Chandika Nanayakkara
- Kumudu Nishantha
- Srimal Wedisinghe
- Asela Jayakody
- Kanchana Kodithuwakku
- Sanketh Wickramarage
- Darshan Dharmaraj
- Chitanjara Warakagoda
- Deepani Silva
- Richard Manamudali
- Ganendri Kongahage

== Production ==
The research for the film began in 2009, based on Professor Lona Devaraja's book, "The Kandian Kingdom". The director stayed in temples for a long time, collected hard-to-find information, studied other works written in English, and collected as much material as was not written in the vernacular or the Mahavamsa.

Nishantha Pradeep is the cinematographer, Praveen Jayaratne is the editor, whereas Narada Dhananji Thotagamuwa and Premalal Liyanage are the make-up artists. Manoj Wickramarasinghe and Chinthaka Wijeratne joined as the art directors, Kalinga Gihan Perera is the Sound mixer and choreographer. Music is composed by Navaratne Gamage and Jagath Wickramasinghe. The lyrics, screenplay and direction are done by Devinda Kongahage. The filming was completed in 2013 but had to wait eight years to make official screen. The film was officially released on 3 December 2021 in Ridma theatre cinemas. The film also became the first Sinhala film to be screened in Kandy City Center Cinema when it was screened on 10 December 2021.

Sameera Hasun, Narada Ratnayake, Shirley Samarasinghe, Asanka, Asanga and Sampath are the assistant directors. Gunathilaka Ranawaka in Production Management. Shashika Abeywickrema, Buddhika Lokuketiya and Sulochana Akalanka contributed. Still photos by Dhammika Pathiratne. Technical work by Ruwan Karunaratne, Chaminda Pathiratne and Buddhika Serasinghe. Production coordination by Nayani Kongahage.

== Recognition ==
The film won the award for the Best Picture at all three international festivals: 2015 Delhi International Film Festival, the Shanghai Golden Chimes International Film Festival and the Asia Tourism Indus Chinese Film Festival.
