= Wassane Sihinaya =

Sri Lankan 2021 drama film by Nihal Sanjaya

- Sinhala: වස්සානේ සිහිනය
- Directed by: Nihal Sanjaya
- Written by: Anton Kingsley
- Produced by: Nihal Sanjaya
- Starring: Sanath Gunathilake; Kanchana Mendis; Roshan Pilapitiya; Cletus Mendis; Nilanthi Dias
- Cinematography: Ganesh Kumar
- Edited by: Anura Bandara
- Music by: Navaratne Gamage
- Distributed by: CEL Theatres
- Release date: 25 March 2021
- Country: Sri Lanka
- Language: Sinhala

Wassane Sihinaya or theatrically Senehasaka Sihinaya, (Sinhala: වස්සානේ සිහිනය හෙවත් සෙනෙහසක සිහිනය; lit. 'Dream of Love'), is a 2021 Sri Lankan Sinhala drama thriller film directed and produced by Nihal Sanjaya with the help of Anton Kingsley and Irfan Senudeen who were the previous co-director and producer respectively. The film stars Sanath Gunathilake, Kanchana Mendis, Roshan Pilapitiya in lead roles along with Dayananda Jayawardana, Cletus Mendis and Nilanthi Dias in supportive roles. A special screening of the film was held at the Liberty Scope Cinema in Kollupitiya.

== Cast ==
- Sanath Gunathilake
- Kanchana Mendis
- Roshan Pilapitiya
- Dayananda Jayawardana
- Cletus Mendis
- Nilanthi Dias
- Manjula Thilini
- Nelum Perera
- Sandali Welikanna

== Production ==
In the year 2003, renowned film producer Soma Edirisinghe produced a film with the involvement of Indian artists where Nihal Sanjaya was the executive producer and artist coordinator. At that time, Sanjaya started his own production company called 'Kisel Arts'. The film was first produced by a friend of Nihal Sanjaya named Irfan Senudeen. Sanjaya was mostly in China when the film was shot in Sri Lanka under the director Anton Kingsley. After shooting completed, all the post-production work was done in India. This 35mm film was then brought to Sri Lanka. After many years, Sanjaya went back to India and scanned the film in 2K technology and made a digital copy. Irfan, the original producer, had financial problems and sold the entire production rights to the director Sanjaya.

== Delay ==
According to the director, the legal ownership of the film was transferred to him about 12 years ago in 2009. Initially it was titled Senehasaka Sihinaya but the original producer had renamed it Wassane Sihinaya. Even though Censor certificate obtained with the title Wassane Sihinaya in 2009, later National Film Corporation was not aware of that name. At the same time, National Film Corporation claimed that there was an outstanding payment due to an artiste for the film. So, Sanjaya had to wait few more years to clearly absolved of all outstanding payments. Later in 2021, he was able to release the film in CEL circuit with the title Senehasaka Sihinaya.
