= Pura Sakmana =

Pura Sakmana පුර සක්මන
- Directed by: Tikiri Ratnayake
- Written by: Tikiri Ratnayake
- Produced by: Sama Rathnayake
- Starring: Anoja Weerasinghe; Kanchana Mendis; Hemasiri Liyanage
- Cinematography: Lal Wickramarachchi
- Edited by: Elmo Halliday
- Music by: Navaratne Gamage
- Distributed by: EAP Theatres
- Release date: 12 February 2003
- Running time: 90 minutes
- Country: Sri Lanka
- Language: Sinhala

Pura Sakmana (Bitter Harvest) (Sinhala: පුර සක්මන) is a 2007 Sri Lankan Sinhala film directed by Tikiri Ratnayake and produced by Sama Rathnayake. It stars Anoja Weerasinghe and Kanchana Mendis in lead roles along with Hemasiri Liyanage and Cletus Mendis. Music composed by Navaratne Gamage. It is the 1001st Sri Lankan film in the Sinhala cinema.

== Cast ==
- Anoja Weerasinghe as Gunawathi
- Kanchana Mendis
- Hemasiri Liyanage
- Janaka Kumbukage
- Richard Weerakody
- Cletus Mendis
- Duleeka Marapana
- Grace Ariyawimal
- Vinnie Wettasinghe

== Screening ==
The film was screened at 26th Cairo Intentional Film Festival and Asian Film Festival in Mumbai.
