= Nim Him =

- නිම් හිම්
- Directed by: Mitchell Fonseka
- Written by: Mitchell Fonseka
- Based on: Hindi film
- Produced by: Ama Films; Alankara Films
- Starring: Gangu Roshana; Milinda Madugalle; Janak Premalal
- Cinematography: Indika Bamunuarachchi
- Edited by: Dilan Gunawardana
- Music by: Sarath Wickrama
- Distributed by: MPI Theaters
- Release date: 6 February 2020
- Country: Sri Lanka
- Languages: Sinhala; Tamil

Nim Him (Sinhala: නිම් හිම්) is a 2020 Sri Lankan Sinhala romantic drama film directed by Mitchell Fonseka and co-produced by director himself with Saman Dharmawansha, Gayan Gunawardana, Pradeep Herath, Indika Madawala and Prince Wickramanayake for Ama Films and Alankara Films. It stars Gangu Roshana and Milinda Madugalle in lead roles along with Janak Premalal and Kumari Munasinghe. Music composed by Sarath Wickrama. The film is influenced by 2016 Bollywood film Sanam Teri Kasam.

== Production ==
This movie was made about five years ago. It usually takes a year and a half to complete and screen the film. The film has been shot in and around Nuwara Eliya, Kurunegala and Colombo. It was released on 6 February 2020 in MPI film theaters across the country with both Sinhala and Tamil languages.

The premiere screening of the film was held at NFC Tharangani Theater in October 2019. The film announced to be released on 15 May 2021. But due to the COVID-19 epidemic, the film could not be screened twice. Finally, the production crew had planned to show it on 13 May 2021. At that time the country was locked down again. Then the film was re-released on 9 December 2021 for the second time.

== Cast ==
- Gangu Roshana as Radhika Krishnaswami
- Milinda Madugalle as Jehan Fernando
- Janak Premalal as Jeyaram, Radhika's father
- Kumari Munasinghe as Arundathi, Radhika's mother
- Nirosha Thalagala as Pooja, Radhika's sister
- W. Jayasiri
- Gihan Fernando as Security in the flat scheme
- Sampath Tennakoon as Secretary of the flat scheme
- Roshan Pilapitiya
- Nilusha Fernando as Jehan's ex-girlfriend
- Anura Bandara Rajaguru
- Wasantha Wittachchi as lawyer Gihan Fernando, Jehan's father
- Susanga Kahandawala as Police officer
- Saman Dharmawansha as Prakash Shasthri
