= Nirosha Thalagala =

Sri Lankan actress

- නිරෝෂා තලගල
- Born: Udayani Nirosha Thalagala; Malabe, Sri Lanka
- Education: University of Kelaniya
- Occupations: Actress; model; dancer
- Years active: 2009-present
- Known for: Suseema

Udayani Nirosha Thalagana (Sinhala: උදයානි නිරෝෂා තලගල) popularly known as Nirosha Thalagala, is a Sri Lankan actress, model and dancer. She is a popular dancer on the stage. She got famous after performing in Sinhala film Suseema which was released in 2011. After that she performed in Aloko Udapadi (2017), Nidahase Piya D S (2018), Nim Him (2020)

== Personal life ==
Nirosha was born in Malabe, Sri Lanka. She went to the Rahula Balika, Malabe and graduated from the University of Kelaniya in 2008. After that, she started her career as a dancer and gradually became an actress and model. In 2009 she married Asela Priyadarshana.

== Filmography ==
Year	Film	Role	Notes
2001	Jonsun and Gonsun	in dance crew	
2011	Suseema		
2016	64 Mayam	Niluka	
2017	Aloko Udapadi	Royal Consort Somadevi	
2018	Nidahase Piya DS	Grace Dunuwila	
2018	Kusal	Geetha, Kusal's mother	
2020	Nim Him		
2025	Kaasi Vaasi		

=== Selected television series ===
- Haara Kotiya
- Kolam Kuttama
- Ralla Weralata Adarei
