= Sri Rahula College, Kandy =

Sri Rahula College
- ශ්‍රී රාහුල විද්‍යාලය
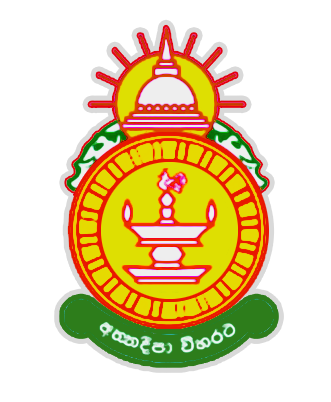

Location
- Kandy; Sri Lanka
- Coordinates: 7.2964°N 80.6350°E

Information
- Type: Public
- Motto: Pali: අතත දීපා විහරථ; Sinhala: තමා තමාටම පහනක් වන්න (Be a light to yourself)
- Established: 1890 (135 years ago)
- Founder: Col. Henry Steel Olcott
- Principal: S. M. C. Weerakoon එස්.එම්.සී. වීරකෝන් මයා
- Staff: 144 teachers
- Grades: Class 1–13
- Colors: Green, yellow and maroon
- Affiliation: Buddhist

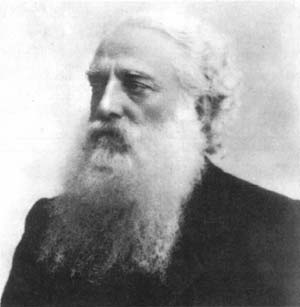
Colonel Henry Steele Olcott, founder of Sri Rahula College Kandy

Sri Rahula College (Sinhala: ශ්‍රී රාහුල විද්‍යාලය) is a mixed national school located in Kandy, Sri Lanka founded by the Buddhist Theosophical Society, which was led by Colonel Henry Steel Olcott in 1890. It offers primary and secondary education for more than 2,000 students from grade 1 to 13.

== History ==
During the late nineteenth-century Sinhalese Buddhist revival, the Buddhist Theosophical Society, under the guidance of Colonel Henry Steel Olcott, founded several Buddhist schools around the country to provide English education to Buddhist students who would otherwise have had to go to a missionary school in order to study English. Under that program, they founded the Kandy High School (now known as Sri Rahula College), on a piece of land at Katugasthota. The school opened with only sixteen students in 1890, with Niyangoda as the first principal of the school.

== College houses ==
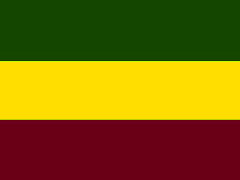
The college flag

There are four college houses, each named after a Sinhalese king. Students compete against each other representing their respective houses to win the annual inter-house games.

- House Vijaya (විජය නිවාසය), named after Prince Vijaya
- House Parakum (පැරකුම් නිවාසය), named after King Parakramabahu I
- House Mahasen (මහසෙන් නිවාසය), named after King Mahasena
- House Gemunu (ගැමුණු නිවාසය), named after King Dutugamunu

== Past principals ==
- Cyril Wijerathne (1991–1999)
- R. M. M. Rathnayake (1999–2002)
- E. M. Abeysekera (2002–2007)
- A. C. C. Perera
- S. M. C. Weerakoon

== Notable alumni ==
- Asela Gunaratne - Sri Lankan Test, ODI, T20 cricketer
- Wimalaratne Kumaragama - Sinhalese poet
