= Hathara Denama Soorayo (2008 film) =

Hathara Denama Soorayo හතරදෙනාම සූරයෝ
- Directed by: Neil Rupasinghe
- Written by: Neil Rupasinghe
- Based on: 1971 film by same name
- Produced by: Neil Rupasinghe
- Starring: Buddhika Jayarathne; Roshan Pilapitiya; Jagath Chamila; Amila Abeysekara
- Cinematography: K. D. Dayananda
- Edited by: Pravin Jayaratne
- Music by: Jayantha Ratnayake
- Production company: Samudra Films
- Distributed by: CEL Theatres
- Release date: 19 February 2008
- Country: Sri Lanka
- Language: Sinhala
- Budget: 15 million LKR

Hathara Denama Soorayo (Sinhala: හතරදෙනාම සූරයෝ) is a 2008 Sri Lankan Sinhala action romantic film directed and produced by Neil Rupasinghe. The film is a remake of 1971 blockbuster of the same name directed and produced by the same person. With that, the film became the second in the history of film industry in the world that the same Producer and Director did a re-make of the same film after 37 years with the same theme creating a world record. The four protagonist roles are played by stars Buddhika Jayarathne, Roshan Pilapitiya, Jagath Chamila and Amila Abeysekara in lead roles along with Chathurika Peiris and Kanchana Mendis. Music composed by Jayantha Ratnayake. It is the 1101st Sri Lankan film in the Sinhala cinema.

== Cast ==
- Buddhika Jayaratne as Podde ayya
- Roshan Pilapitiya as Vijay
- Jagath Chamila as Jagiriya aka Jaggi
- Amila Abeysekara as Linton
- Chathurika Peiris as Nilmini
- Kanchana Mendis as Soma
- Chinthaka Kulatunga as Harry
- Duleeka Marapana as Soma's mother, Bath amma
- Chandika Nanayakkara as Police officer
- Tissa Wijesurendra as Mr. Samarasinghe, Nilmini's father
- Nadeeka Gunasekara as Mrs. Samarasinghe, Nilmini's step mother
- Gnananga Gunawardena as Uncle
- Teddy Vidyalankara
- Nadeesha Alahapperuma as Jaggi's fiancée
- Manjula Thilini as Sumana
- Kavindu Perera as Sumana's brother

== Soundtrack ==
No.	Title	Singer(s)	Length
1.	"Me Desa Mage"	H. R. Jothipala
2.	"Kodi Gaha Yata"	Walter Fernando, Ajith Premalal
3.	"Aha Aha Adaraneeya Sinawe"	H. R Jothipala, Angeline Gunathilake
4.	"Pathum Mallaki Me Jeevithe"	Latha Walpola
5.	"Raththaranin Ran Kirilliye"	Walter Fernando, Anjaline Gunathilake
