= Nadeeka Gunasekara =

Sri Lankan actress (born 1968)

- නදීකා ගුණසේකර
- Born: Dissanayake Wijesuriyage Sandhya Darshani Gunasekara; May 13, 1958 (age 68); Kandy, Sri Lanka
- Education: Pushpadana Girls' College, Kandy; Mahamaya Girls' College, Kandy; University of Kelaniya
- Occupation: Actress Producer
- Years active: 1980–present
- Spouse: Suren Hapuarachchi
- Children: Thenuki Hapuarachchi
- Parent(s): Thalatha Gunasekara; Stanley Gunasekara
- Awards: Best Supporting Actress
- Website: Nadeeka Gunasekara on Facebook

Dissanayake Wijesuriyage Sandhya Darshani Gunasekara (born May 13, 1958 as නදීකා ගුණසේකර) [Sinhala]), popularly known as Nadeeka Gunasekara, is an actress in Sri Lankan cinema and television. Gunasekara is best known for the character as Dan Chooty in film Chanchala Rekha by Sena Samarasinghe.

== Personal life ==
Nadeeka Gunasekara was born on 13 May 1958 in Kandy as the eldest of the family with four siblings. Her father Stanley Gunasekara worked at Nawalapitiya post office. Her mother Thalatha Gunasekara was a school teacher and a popular film actress. She has one younger sister: Ganga and one younger brother from mother's first marriage and two younger sisters from her second marriage: Vidya and Yamuna.

When she was 3 year old, they moved to Charle's de Silva flats, Nawalapitiya. She started school with Udugoda Vidyalaya, then Uduheenthanna Senadhikara Vidyalaya. Due to her father being a post officer, they had to move to several cities, where Gunasekara then studied in Gampola. In 1973, she attended to Pushpadana Girls' College, Kandy and then to Vishaka Balika Vidyalaya, Bandarawela. She completed A/L from art stream in Mahamaya Girls' College, Kandy. She is a graduate of BA in Arts from the University of Kelaniya.

She is married to businessman Suren Hapuarachchi and in 2004, the couple had one daughter, Thenuki Sehansa.

== Acting career ==
Her maiden cinematic experience came through 1980 film Kanchana directed by M.A. Sangadasa while doing A/Ls. Her most popular films include Kanchana, Chanchala Rekha, Biththi Hathara and Thani Tharuwa. She acted as leading actress in 19 films and has produced 2 films - Ahinsa and Aya Obata Barai. Her stage name, Nadeeka was given by Siri Kularatne.

=== Selected television serials ===
- Ada Sihinaya
- Chanchala Rekha
- Ganga Addara Kele
- Himi Ahimi
- Parasathu Malak
- Sandali Saha Radika

== Filmography ==
Key
†	Denotes films that have not yet been released

Year	Film	Role	Ref.
1980	Kanchana	Kanchana	
1980	Sinhabahu	Sinha Sivali	
1981	Baddegama	Hinnihami	
1981	Vajira	Gajasinghe Arachige Vajira Laxmi Priyadarshani 'Sheela' 'Manike'	
1981	Chanchala Rekha	Dan Chuti	
1982	Adhistana	Mangalika	
1982	Ridee Nimnaya	Kusalawathie	
1982	Sithaara		
1982	Yahalu Yeheliyo	Mudithalatha	
1982	Thani Tharuwa		
1982	Biththi Hathara	Nandani	
1983	Samanala Sihina		
1983	Siwu Ranga Sena	Kamani	
1984	Batti	Batti	
1985	Wathsala Akka	Wathsala	
1985	Doringe Sayanaya		
1985	Kirimaduwal		
1987	Yugayen Yugayata		
1987	Ahinsa	Kalpana	
1989	Okkoma Rajawaru		
1989	Waradata Danduwama		
1990	Hondin Naththam Narakin		
1990	Pem Rajadahana		
1991	Ran Hadawatha	Antony's wife	
1991	Cheriyo Doctor	Madhu	
1992	Yasasa		
1992	Oba Mata Wiswasai	Vasanthi / Samanthi	
1993	Chaya	Selli	
1993	Haathi Mere Saathi		
1995	Rodaya		
1996	Sihina Vimane Kumariya	Nimeshika Rajapakse	
1996	Loku Duwa		
1997	Yasoma	Yasoma	
1998	Aya Obata Barai	Kumari	
1999	Rathu Aluyama	Emilia	
2000	Danduwama		
2001	Wasanthaye Kunatuwak		
2003	Madre Teresa	Architect's companion	
2003	Sundarai Adare	Madhura 'Madhu' Weearsinghe	
2004	Premawanthayo		
2008	Hathara Denama Soorayo	Mrs. Samarasinghe	
2010	Viyapath Bambara		
2011	Nidi Yahana Kelabei		
2011	Angara Dangara	Janaki Wikramasinghe	
2012	Senasuru Maruwa	Anuththara's mother	
2012	Daruwane	Vishaka, Vaijrasena's wife	
2014	Ahelepola Kumarihami	Pusselle Kumarihami	
2015	Maharaja Ajasath	Kakawalli	
2015	Sinahawa Atharin	Cameo role	
2016	Sinhaya	Professor	
2016	Ran Dedunnak	Shiva's mother	
2018	Adarei Man		
2023	Guththila	cameo	
2023	Yugathra	Mrs.Suryabandara	
2025	Elada Braa		
TBA	Rapist †		

== Awards and accolades ==
She has won several awards at the local film festivals.

=== Unda Awards ===
Year	Nominee / work	Award	Result
1987	Himi Ahimi	Best Actress	Won

=== Sarasaviya Awards ===
Year	Nominee / work	Award	Result
1982		Lux Upcoming Actress	Won
1985	Batti	Best Performance	Won
1988	Ahinsa	Best Performance	Won
1994	Chaya	Best Supporting Actress	Won

=== Presidential Film Awards ===
Year	Nominee / work	Award	Result
1981	Baddegama	Best Supporting Actress	Won
1983	Yahalu Yeheli	Merit Award	Won
1993	Chaya	Best Supporting Actress	Won
