= Cletus Mendis =

Sri Lankan actor and filmmaker

Cletus Mendis ක්ලීටස් මෙන්ඩිස්
- Born: Gammada Liyanage Cletus Paulinus Mendis; 17 July 1949 (age 77); Negombo, Sri Lanka
- Occupations: Actor, filmmaker, singer, writer
- Years active: 1973 – Present
- Spouse: Dorin Jayakody

Gammada Liyanage Cletus Paulinus Mendis, popularly known as Cletus Mendis (born as ක්ලීටස් මෙන්ඩිස් Sinhala) is a Sri Lankan actor, mainly works in cinema and television. He has received a number of awards for portraying villains at the Sarasaviya, OCIC, Raigam, and Presidential film festivals.

== Acting career ==
In 1971, before moving to silver screen, Mendis did dramas at church feasts and taught gymnastics and martial arts to the youth at Katupotha. Then 1973, he went to Colombo to face an interview with Henry Chandrawansa and then met Sugath Samarakoone at that interview. In 1977, he worked as the stunt director of the film Wanagatha Kella.

His first cinema acting came in the 1978 epic history film Veera Puran Appu as a supporting actor. Then he acted in Yali Pipunu Malak in 1983. His first villain character came through the 1982 film Paramitha, which turned his filming career towards villain roles throughout the rest of the decades.

In 2004, Mendis joined Vishva Kala Sarasaviya at Mount Lavinia and met Udayakantha Warnasuriya. In 2021, he was honored with the 'Deshabhimani Keerthi Kalabushana' award.

=== Selected television serials ===
- Divithura
- Sihina Wasanthayak
- Siri Sirimal

== Filmography ==
Key
†	Denotes films that have not yet been released

Year	Film	Role	Ref.
1978	Veera Puran Appu	Puran Appu's soldier	
1987	Viragaya	Jinadasa	
1991	Cheriyo Doctor	Cleet	
1995	Cheriyo Captain	Alphonsus	
1998	Anthima Reya		
1999	Koti Sana		
2000	Sanda Yahanata	Politician	
2002	Sathkampa	Saliya	
2003	Sundarai Adare	Senaka Weerasekera	
2003	Pura Sakmana		
2003	Sepata Dukata Sunny	Tara's brother	
2003	Aladinge Waldin	Mr. Dekatana 'Julie' also as playback singer	
2003	Taxi Driver		
2003	Bheeshanaye Athuru Kathawak	Akman	
2004	Salamuthu Pinna		
2004	Underworld		
2006	Supiri Balawatha	Gajanayake	
2010	Jaya Pita Jaya	Douglas	
2010	Thank You Berty	Police Inspector	
2010	Subha		
2010	Viyapath Bambara		
2011	Sinhawalokanaya	Jagilis	
2012	Kurumittek Avilla		
2012	Vijaya Kuweni	Upatissa	
2014	Ahelepola Kumarihami	Purohitha	
2014	Parapura	SSP. First direction also as producer and screenwriter	
2015	Maharaja Ajasath	Purohitha	
2015	Aathma Warusha		
2016	Natannethuwa Dinna	President	
2016	Ape Kaalaye Patachara	Situthuma	
2017	Aloko Udapadi	Pilaya Mara	
2018	Vaishnavee	Boatman	
2019	Eka Renaka Kurullo	Police officer	
2020	Seda Mawathe	CID chief	
2021	Wassane Sihinaya		
2022	Rashmi		
2025	Soona	cameo role	
2025	69		
TBA	Thanapathilage Gedara †		
TBA	Elakandiye Marcus †	Elakandiye Marcus	
TBA	Sparsha †		
TBA	Jeewa †		
TBA	Marukathara †		
TBA	Agni †		
TBA	Ruwan Tharuka †		
TBA	Case Number 447 †		
TBA	Magam Soli †		
TBA	Deva Matha †		
TBA	Yathra †		
TBA	Gagana †		
