= Roshan Pilapitiya =

Sri Lankan actor and singer (born 1975)

Roshan Pilapitiya රොෂාන් පිලපිටිය
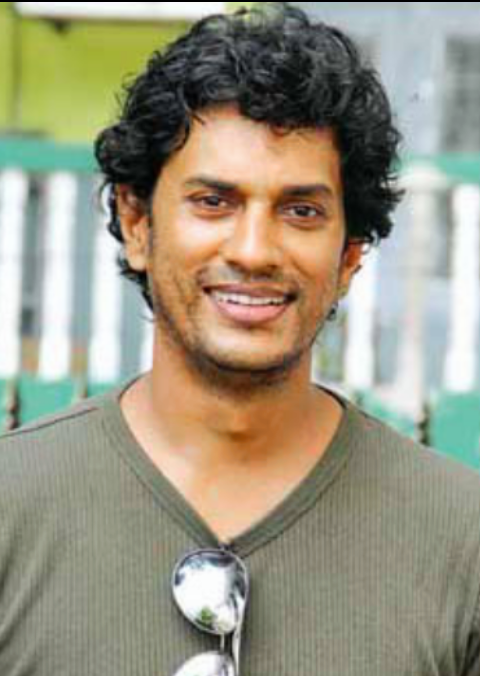
- Born: Polwatta Rajapaksa Rajakaruna Rajawasala Mudiyanselage Chethiya Roshan Bandara Abeysinghe Pilapitiya; 21 March 1975 (age 51); Kandy, Sri Lanka
- Education: Dharmaraja College
- Occupations: Actor, singer
- Years active: 1988–present
- Spouse: Ridma Perera (2017–present)
- Partner: Chathurika Pieris (2001–2012)
- Children: 1
- Parents: Ariya Abhayasinghe (father); Mallika Pilapitiya (mother)
- Website: helloroshan.com

Polwatta Rajapaksa Rajakaruna Rajawasala Mudiyanselage Chethiya Roshan Bandara Abeysingha Pilapitiya (born 21 March 1975: Sinhala: රොෂාන් පිලපිටිය), popularly known as Roshan Pilapitiya, is an actor in Sri Lankan cinema, theatre and television as well as a singer. Largely active in television serials, Pilapitiya was awarded the most popular actor award at Sumathi Tele Awards in 2003 and 2004.

== Personal life ==
As the youngest of the four children, Roshan was born on 21 March 1975 in Hanguranketha, city near Kandy, Sri Lanka. His father is Ariya Abhayasinghe who was a tea plantation owner. His mother Mallika Pilapitiya is also a retired actress, where she recorded the first female lead role of Sri Lanka's first outdoor movie Rekava in 1956 directed by Lester James Peries. She died on 26 March 2022 at the age of 86.

His primary education is from C. C. College, Hanguranketha, and then he attended Dharmaraja College, Kandy for secondary education. He also performed well in college stage dramas. He was a bright student in the school, where he was a member of the best drama crew of the school in 1988, and also won the award for inter-school best actor in 1988. Roshan is a very family oriented and a strong Buddhist. He had two older brothers: Kapila, Chathura and one older sister, Thrishara. He has referred to his family many times in public and always talks about how he has a great family.

== Career ==
During 1987–1989 JVP insurrection period, he worked in a musical band. His career was started with Lester James Peries' teledrama Golu Hadawatha. At the start he was also a singer who performed in the band Red Heart, performed as a guitarist, keyboard player and also as a singer. His debut film was an English film called Disco Girl in 1990. Pilapitiya lead the role of remake of film Hatharadenaama Soorayo in 2008, which was originally led by Vijaya Kumaratunga.

Pilapitya made his acting debut with teledrama Golu Hadawatha (1988), which was directed by popular director Lester James Peries. He won a Presidential award for best upcoming actor in 2002. He played the main part of several commercial successes such as Mandakini (1999), Daru Upatha (2001), Rajjumala (2004), Dhana Rina (2007) and critically acclaimed act in teledramas such as Ek Murgaanganaawiyak.

=== Notable television serials ===
- Golu Hadawatha (1988)
- Mandakini (1999)
- Ek Murgaanganaawiyak (1999)
- Gini Dalu Meda (1999)
- Magi (2000)
- Mahagedara (2000)
- Weda Mahaththaya (2000)
- Daruwange Ammala (2000)
- Dath Kekulu Pala (2000)
- Magi (2000)
- Hemanthaye Wasanthayak (2001)
- Daru Upatha (2001)
- Nisala Diya Sasala Viya (2001)
- Diya Sewaneli (2001)
- Ambu Daruwo (2001)
- Sooriya Daruwo (2002)
- Indrachapa (2005)
- Issaraha Gedara (2002)
- Visi Ekwana Horawa (2002)
- Monara Kirilli (2002)
- Suwanda Obai Amme (2003)
- Sandawathaka Waruna (2003)
- Samanala Gamanak (2003)
- Sathyaya (2003)
- Diya Sithuvam (2004)
- Wasanthaya Awilla (2004)
- Rajjumala (2004)
- Rangana Vijithaya (2004)
- Samanala Gamana (2004)
- Sanda Hiru Tharu (2004)
- Vasanthaya Avilla (2004)
- Rankira Soya (2004)
- Sandali Saha Radika (2006)
- Sujatha (2006)
- Heeye Manaya (2006)
- Pethi Ahulana Mala (2006)
- Dhana Rina (2007)
- Surangana Duwa (2007)
- Man Hinda (2007)
- Satharadenek Senpathiyo (2007)
- Dewana Maw (2007)
- Kampitha Vill (2008)
- Karuwala Gedara (2008)
- Diya Sithuwam (2008)
- Isuru Yogaya (2006)
- Sihina Kumari (2009)
- Sulang Kapolla (2010)
- Prarthana Mal (2010)
- Me Sonduru Piyapath (2010)
- Sihina Aran Enna (2010)
- Prarthana (2011)
- Isuru Sangramaya (2011)
- Doowaru (2012)
- Isuru Sangramaya (2012)
- Nirsathwayo (2013)
- Sasara Sarani (2014)
- Raena (2014)
- Daskon (2015)
- Devi (2016)
- Me Mamai (2016)
- Salsapuna (2016–2018)
- Sooriya Nayo (2017)
- Thawa Durai Jeewithe (2017)
- Sidu (2016–2018)
- Kotipathiyo (2018)
- Neela Pabulu (2018–2022)
- Raahu (2018)
- Idora Wassa (2018)
- Amuthu Rasikaya (2019)
- Ran Bedi Minissu (2019)
- Sanda Nati Reya (2020)
- Sanda Wimana (2020)
- Susumaka Ima (2019)
- Click (2019)
- Ahas Maliga (2019)
- Nenala (2020)
- Paara Dige (2021–2022)
- Api Apa Athara (2021)
- Ves Gaththo (2021)
- 4chun Residencies (2023)
- Circuskarayo (2023)
- Kunchanadha (2024)
- Paata Kurullo (2024–2025)
- Prema Rasthiyaduwa (2024)
- Sikuru Awith (2024)
- Jahuta (2025)

=== Songs ===
Following list is the songs of Roshan Pilapitiya.

- Mage Nisala Lowe
- Sahasak Sithuwili
- Soduru Pem Kathawak
- Soduru Sedewaka
- Atheethayata Yana Pare
- Bidunu Premaya
- Matath Hora Mage Nethu Laga
- Hamuwee Wenwi Giyath
- Nonimi Pemaka Petali
- Paasal Samaye Dutu.
- Hitha Parala
- Dakinna Awe

=== Awards ===
- Best Upcoming Actor in Sumathi Awards – 2000
- Dharmaraja Abhinandana Award – 2001
- Best Upcoming Actor in Sarasaviya Awards – 2002
- Best Upcoming Actor in Presidential Awards – 2002
- Most Popular Actor in Sumathi Awards – 2003
- Most Popular Actor in Sumathi Awards – 2004
- Best Actor in Sumathi Awards – 2005

== Filmography ==
Key
†	Denotes films that have not yet been released

Year	Film	Language	Role	Ref.
1990	Disco Girl	English		
1991	Senehasaka Sihinaya	Sinhala		
1991	Iron Trungal	English		
1992	New York Dreams	English		
1994	Nohadan Landune	Sinhala	Rathnapala	
1995	Ross & Margurette	French		
1999	Mandakini	Sinhala		
2000	Sanda Yahanata	Sinhala		
2000	Ginigath Madusamaya	Sinhala	Anuruddha	
2001	Daru Upatha	Sinhala		
2002	Sudu Sewaneli	Sinhala	Heen Banda	
2004	Samawenna Ma Raththarane	Sinhala		
2004	Rajjumala	Sinhala		
2006	Ammawarune	Sinhala	Saliya	
2006	Eka Malaka Pethi	Sinhala	Arun Basnayake	
2007	Mr Dana Rina	Sinhala	Roshan	
2008	Hathara Denaama Soorayo remake	Sinhala	Vijay	
2008	Nil Diya Yahana	Sinhala		
2010	Dakina Dakina Mal	Sinhala	Aravinda	
2011	Mahindagamanaya	Sinhala	Minister Aritta	
2013	Samanala Sandhawaniya	Sinhala	Punya's husband	
2014	Swarnapali	Sinhala		
2014	Bhavatharana	Sinhala		
2016	Natannethuwa Dinna	Sinhala	Nishan Porapitiya	
2017	Dharmayuddhaya	Sinhala	OIC Ravi	
2018	Nela	Sinhala	Charles	
2018	Vaishnavee	Sinhala	Laxmi's lover	
2018	Nidahase Piya DS	Sinhala	D. C. Senanayake	
2018	Tawume Iskole	Sinhala	Doctor Vijay	
2019	Bhavatharana	Sinhala		
2019	Reload	Sinhala	Yama King	
2020	Nim Him	Sinhala		
2020	The Horn	Sinhala	Dino	
2021	Wassane Sihinaya	Sinhala		
2023	Kadira Divyaraja	Sinhala		
2024	Passport	Sinhala		
2024	Wishma	Sinhala		
TBA	Girivassipura †	Sinhala		
TBA	Thanapathilage Gedara †	Sinhala		
TBA	Agni †	Sinhala		
TBA	Rosa Kale Api Yan †	Sinhala		
TBA	Yathra †	Sinhala		
TBA	Madhura Katu †	Sinhala		
TBA	Gagana †	Sinhala		
TBA	Dharmayuddhaya 3 †	Sinhala		
