= Senesh Dissanaike Bandara =

Sri Lankan film director

- Born: Colombo, Sri Lanka
- Education: Nalanda College, Colombo; University of Kelaniya; University of Sri Jayewardenepura; University of Peradeniya; New York Film Academy; National Radio and Television Administration, Korean Broadcasting System
- Occupations: Senior Lecturer in University of Sri Jayewardenepura, Filmmaker and Television Director
- Known for: Film Studies, Television Studies, Communication Studies, Media Studies, Youth Studies,

Senesh Dissanaike Bandara Ph.D, MA, BA (Hons.) සෙනේෂ් දිසානායක බණ්ඩාර is a film director and a television drama director in Sri Lanka. His first film Aadaraneeya Wassaanaya (Love in Autumn) in 2004 was screened for more than 100 days island wide.

Senesh is a member of the State Television Arts Panel of the Arts Council of Sri Lanka. Former Secretary, Executive Committee Member and Editor of Telemakers Guild of Sri Lanka, Executive Committee Member and Editor of Film Directors Guild of Sri Lanka.

== Career ==
=== Television ===
Senesh started his media career as a television program producer at Sri Lanka Rupavahini Corporation (National television) in 1991 as a teenage school leaver. Senesh produced musicals, talk shows, sports coverage, documentaries, entertainment and television magazine programs such as The News Station, Udaa Vikashaya, Rasa Kalasa, Visi Ekveni Peya and a current affairs magazine program called 9.05.

Senesh was one of the pioneer music video directors in Sri Lanka, with his musical/magazine program called Yaathra (Voyage) (1995–1997). Senesh has also been a television presenter and a host since 1997 of television talk shows, entertainment and music programs such as Gee Hatha, Ayubowan, Rividina Sithumina, Rhythm Chat, Watts 33000.

In 2000, Senesh directed a television drama series named Fantasy Avenue for Sirasa TV. It led him to direct a made-for-TV or telefilm for national television during 2001 called Sulanga Wenna Numba Ethakota for the World Habitat Day 2001.

His other television drama serials are Pulina Praasaada (Sand Castles) 2003, Arunoda Kalaapaya (Twilight Zone) 2005, Rala Bindena Thena (Breakwater) 2007, Wehi Pabalu Seala (Raindrop Satin) 2010. Rala Bindena Thena won the maximum number of awards in all three national television based award festivals that was held in Sri Lanka in 2008 and also Rala Bindena Thena awarded him the Best Director Award in the festivals.

=== Film ===
Aadaraneeya Wassaanaya was released in May 2004 with his own screenplay based on a Sri Lankan novel, Wassaana Sihinaya by Upul Shantha Sannasgala. This romantic musical was a commercial success. "Aadaraneeya Wassaanaya" won 14 awards including for direction, music, camera, editing, acting and film was nominated for 15 Categories in Presidential Awards, Sarasaviya Awards, and SIGNIS Awards Film Festivals in Sri Lanka.

Senesh was invited for his second movie Heart FM (Film) venture by EAP Films and Theaters in mid-2006 and the movie Heart FM (Sihina Mandaakini) was released in January 2008. This 35mm Cinemascope / DTS film had the earliest use of digital intermediate (DI) and digital optical (DO) involvement in Sri Lankan popular cinema.

=== Print ===
Senesh has published a handbook on Single Camera Television Techniques Roopalekha – Aadhunika Television Nishpaadakawarayage Athpotha the Sinhala translation of Prof Wayne Levy (Australia) and Asian Mass Communication and Information Center (Singapore) publication in 2089 and he is the initial editor of Mawbima – Sandaeliya the Sunday tabloid since 2006 to 2007.

== Selected filmography ==
=== Film ===
- 2009: Living with Hope, director

=== Music video ===
(selected from 30 entries)

- 2008: World's Aids Day, music video, Rupavahini, concept/director

=== Reality show ===
- 2008: Innovator '08, Innovations in Sri Lanka, reality television series on inventors, Rupavahini, concept writer/scriptwriter/production designer/director (6 episodes)
