= Wasantha Kumaravila =

Sri Lankan actor, and stunt director (born 1978)

Wasantha Kumaravila වසන්ත කුමාරවිල
- Born: 31 December 1978 (age 47); Kalutara, Sri Lanka
- Occupations: Actor, Stunt Director
- Years active: 2000 – present
- Spouse: Aruni Kumaravila
- Children: Mahima, Tharushi

Wasantha Kumaravila (born December 31, 1955, as වසන්ත කුමාරවිල [Sinhala]) is a Sri Lankan actor, film producer, stunt performer, and stunt director. He is most notable for his role as "Wasantha" in the soap opera Nilanjana, directed by Suki Jeyaram.

== Early life ==
He was born on 31 December 1978 in Kalutara. He has one elder brother who acted in few stage dramas. Kumaravila is married to his longtime partner Aruni and the couple has two daughters, Mahima and Tharushi.

== Career ==
At the age of 14, Kumaravila met stunt director Sarath Silva. With the guidance of his brother and Silva, Kumaravila was selected to play in a fight in the 1992 film Kiyala Wadak Na directed by Hemasiri Sellapperuma. It was a small stunt act lasted about 45 seconds. In 1997, a film production crew came to Sri Lanka for the filming of stunt movie Bloodsport III starred by Daniel Bernhardt. Kumaravila joined with the film crew and had a three months international camping. After the film, he moved to stage dramas, where he performed as a professional stunt artist. In international cinema, Kumaravila first starred as a martial artist in the Hollywood movie Jackpot Part 3 under the guidance of veteran film director Chandran Ratnam. He also joined with some Italian, German, Pakistan and Indian films, where he gained lot of experience.

In 2003, he co-produced the film Underworld with Arjuna Kamalanath. In 2004, with the help of fellow stuntmen, Kumaravila produced the film Underworld. The film was directed by Sudesh Wasantha Pieris and starred Arjuna Kamalanath along with former stunt directors Rex Kodippili, Cletus Mendis and Robin Fernando. However, screening of the film abandoned after 14 days due to 2004 Indian Ocean earthquake and tsunami disaster. In 2016, along with Sanjeewa Kumara, Kumaravila produced the film Ran Sayura. In 2019, he produced his second cinema production, Maanaya. On 8 July 2016, he established a stunt school at Bellanvila.

In television, he made few notable roles in the serials: Ranthili Wewa, Sakuge Lokaya and Bandhana. In 2025, he appeared in the historical film Devi Kusumasana as an actor and stunt director. In the film, he introduced cable stunts to Sri Lankan cinema.

== Filmography & Stunt Coordination ==
Year	Film	Acting role	Other roles	Ref.
1992	Kiyala Wadak Na		Minor stuntman	
2000	Sanda Yahanata		Stunt director	
2000	Dadabima		Minor Stuntman	
2001	Kanyaviyage Rathriya			
2002	Magul Sakwala		Stunt director	
2002	Saraagi		Stunt director	
2003	Pissu Trible		Stunt director	
2004	Clean Out	Sudha's henchman		
2004	Haadu Wassak			
2004	Samawenna Ma Raththarane			
2004	Jolly Boys		Stunt director	
2004	Underworld	Suraj	Stunt director	
2004	Ukusu Es		Stunt director	
2005	Sanduni		Stunt director	
2005	James Bond	-	Stunt director	
2005	Meedum Wasanthe		Stunt director	
2005	Seethala Hadu		Stunt director	
2006	Naga Kanya	–	Stunt director	
2006	Dharma Puthra	Dharma		
2007	Weda Beri Tarzan	–	Stunt director	
2007	Jundai Gundai	–	Stunt director	
2008	Ali Pancha Mage Mithura		Stunt director	
2008	Adaraye Namayen	–	Stunt director	
2008	Wada Bari Tarzan Mathisabayata	–	Stunt director	
2008	Sura Sepa Soya			
2009	Ali Surathal		Stunt director	
2009	Sihina Devduwa		Stunt director	
2010	Thank You Berty	–	Stunt director	
2011	Sweet Angel		Stunt director	
2011	Sinhawalokanaya	Chanthuwa	Stunt director	
2012	Jeevithe Lassanai	Anton		
2014	Sathiyakata Mata Rata Baradenna			
2014	Ranja	Kalu Vijay	Stunt director	
2015	Pravegaya	–	Stunt director	
2015	Maharaja Ajasath	Maha Senavi	Stunt director	
2016	Ran Sayura	Michael	Producer, Stunt director	
2016	Maya 3D	Shantha		
2016	Ran Dedunnak	Mark	Stunt director	
2019	Maanaya	Vikum	Producer, Stunt director	
2020	The Newspaper	Robbery leader		
2022	The Game	Siam		
2023	Kadira Divyaraja			
2024	Kambili		Stunt director	
2025	Rosa Adare	Hector		
TBA	Jeewa †		Stunt director	
TBA	Sōṇā †		Stunt director	
