= Aathma Warusha =

- Sinhala: ආත්ම වරුෂා
- Directed by: Kusum Chandra Gamage
- Written by: Kusum Chandra Gamage
- Produced by: Niko Films
- Starring: Lal Weerasinghe; Anusha Damayanthi; Cletus Mendis
- Cinematography: Nimal Nakandala
- Edited by: M. S. Aliman
- Music by: Asela Indralal
- Release date: 28 August 2015
- Country: Sri Lanka
- Language: Sinhala

Aathma Warusha (Sinhala: ආත්ම වරුෂා) is a 2015 Sri Lankan Sinhala drama thriller film directed by Kusum Chandra Gamage and produced by Mohomed Saleem for Niko Films. It stars Lal Weerasinghe and Anusha Damayanthi in lead roles along with Cletus Mendis and Robin Fernando. Music composed by Asela Indralal. The film was released 10 years after its shooting. It is the 1234th Sri Lankan film in the Sinhala cinema.

== Cast ==
- Lal Weerasinghe as Wije
- Anusha Damayanthi
- Robin Fernando
- Cletus Mendis
- Vishaka Siriwardana
- Miyuri Samarasinghe
- Chandi Rasika
- Sureni Senarath
- Sarath Silva
- Sarath Dikkumbura
- Mark Samson
