= Ranjan Ramanayake =

Sri Lankan actor-politician (born 1963)

Ranjan Ramanayake Hon.
- රන්ජන් රාමනායක ரஞ்சன் ராமநாயக்க

Member of Parliament for Gampaha District
- In office 1 September 2015 – 7 April 2021
- Succeeded by: Ajith Mannapperuma
- Majority: 103,992 Preferential Votes

Member of Parliament for Ratnapura District
- In office 22 April 2010 – 26 June 2015
- Majority: 59,318 Preferential Votes

State Minister of Highways and Road Development
- In office 21 December 2018 – 21 November 2019
- President: Maithripala Sirisena
- Prime Minister: Ranil Wickremesinghe
- Minister: Kabir Hashim

Deputy Minister of Social Empowerment & Welfare
- In office 4 September 2015 – 26 October 2018
- President: Maithripala Sirisena
- Prime Minister: Ranil Wickremesinghe
- Minister: S. B. Dissanayake

Deputy Minister of Social Services & Live Stock
- In office 21 January 2015 – 17 August 2015
- President: Maithripala Sirisena
- Prime Minister: Ranil Wickremesinghe
- Minister: P. Harrison

Leader of the opposition of the Sabaragamuwa Provincial Council
- In office 23 August 2008 – 22 April 2010

Personal details
- Born: Sadda Vidda Rajapakse Palanga Pathira Ambakumarage Ranjan Leo Sylvester Alfonso; 11 March 1963 (age 63) Negombo, Sri Lanka
- Party: United Democratic Voice (since 2024)
- Other political affiliations: Samagi Jana Balawegaya (2020–2024); United National Party (before 2020)
- Relations: Vijaya Kumaranatunga; Jeewan Kumaranatunga; Chandrika Kumaratunga; Carlo Fonseka
- Education: Maris Stella College
- Occupation: Politician
- Profession: Actor

Sadda Vidda Rajapakse Palanga Pathira Ambakumarage Ranjan Leo Sylvester Alfonso (born 11 March 1963) (රන්ජන් රාමනායක), popularly known as Ranjan Ramanayake, is a Sri Lankan actor, film director, singer, scriptwriter and retired politician who appeared in a number of Sinhala language films. He is a former Member of the Parliament.

Ranjan served as the State Minister of Highways and Road Development from 2018 to 2019. He served as the Deputy Minister of Social Services, Welfare and Livestock Development Under Good Governance in 2015 and Deputy Minister of Social Empowerment and Welfare from 2015 to 2018. Ramanayake won the Sarasaviya Best Actor Award in 2006 and won the Sarasaviya Most Popular Actor Award four times. He has appeared in over 75 Sinhalese films in genres ranging from romance to action and comedies, starting his career appearing in theatre, stage and several television series.

== Personal life ==
Ranjan was born on 11 March 1963 in Negombo, Sri Lanka. He is the youngest in the family of two children, son of Simon Alfonso, District Inspector at Sri Lanka Railways Department. He added 'Ramanayake' to his name as a reciprocation to filmmaker Somaratne Ramanayake, who helped him in establishing his film career as a lead actor.

In August 2019, he appeared in GCE A/L exam again after 1982 to pursue his later career as lawyer. On 27 December 2019, he went viral in the social media as he publicised his A/L results (2S & 1F). Subsequently, he also qualified to study law after obtaining A pass for General English, S passes for Political Science and Communication media studies despite failing in Christianity subject.

== Cinema career ==
Ramanayake's first leading role was in the commercial film Jaya Kothenada, but his first film was Christhu Charithaya by Dr. Sunil Ariyaratne, which was in a crowded scene and maintained his status as a commercial film star through the 1990s. Ramanayake has occasionally branched out into more serious roles such as in Lester James Peries' Awaragira but continues to be known for his commercial roles. In 1998, he won the Sarasaviya Award for the Best Upcoming Actor for the film Hima Gira. He continued to be the Popular Actor in Sarasaviya Festival since 2002 to 2016, with a record 14 times.

Recently, he has taken more control over his commercial film roles working as a director and screenwriter on Parliament Jokes, One Shot and Leader, breaking box office records with these films. Bandu Samarasinghe and Tennyson Cooray are frequent co-stars of Ramanayake.

He has sung in several films including Jaya Kothenada, Naralowa Holman, Love in Bangkok and others. His song "Ran Samanala Joduwa Wage" was a well-received among other songs.

Ramanayake has acted in a few television serials.

=== Television serials ===
- Bhagya
- Charulatha
- Guru Geethaya
- Iti Mal
- Nil Mahanel
- Pitagamkarayo
- Senahesa Suvndhai
- Sagaraya Parada
- Sanda Kinduru
- Santhuwaranaya
- Sath Sanda Kirana
- Sudu Mal Kanda
- Ulamage Rathriya

== Politics ==
Ramanayake was initially the electoral organiser of Katana in the Gampaha Electoral District before becoming the electoral organiser in Balangoda. In 2008, Ramanayake contested for the position of Chief Minister of the Sabaragamuwa Provincial Council and became leader of the opposition of the council.

In 2010, he was elected to the district parliament in Ratnapura from the United National party (UNP) and was one of the most outspoken members of the parliament, working as a major opposition activist against the then-incumbent United People's Freedom Alliance (UPFA) government. Ramanayake was later appointed as the UNP organiser of Divulapitiya in Gampaha. Ramanayake received the highest number of preferential votes for the UNP in the Gampaha district during the 2015 parliamentary elections, receiving a total of 216,463 votes. He was reelected in 2020. However, he lost his seat in 2021 when he was sentenced to 6 years in prison for contempt of court.

== Controversies ==
=== Arrest ===
A school teacher from Kandy accused Ramanayake of having swindled Rs. 1 million promising to marry her. Based on a complaint by the woman who accused, the Criminal Investigation Department arrested Ramanayake in 2010. On 4 January 2020, he was arrested for possession of a license-expired firearm and several adult content DVDs. He was released on bail on 5 January 2020 following the verdict from Magistrate court but was also banned from travelling overseas.

=== Alleged threat to talk show host ===
In 2010, it was alleged that Ramanayake verbally threatened Derana TV talk show host Dilka Samanmali over a segment of the Derana 360 talk show. Ramanayake allegedly called Samanmali's parents over the phone and accused her of causing disrepute to him during the programm. He had also allegedly warned the parents that harm may befall their daughter. Ramanayake denied the allegation, stating that he simply gave Dilka's father was a courtesy call. Ramanayake confirmed that he did call Dilka Samanmali's father and complained that his daughter held biased viewpoints which she expressed during her show.

=== Recordings leak ===
Ramanayake's telephone conversations with former CID director Shani Abeysekara and other high-profile figures including judges were leaked in the media after the police took custody of them. Several other telephone conversations were leaked by the police to the public as well and the recordings suggested that Ramanayake used the law in unlawful manner to benefit his government.

=== Contempt of Court ===
On 12 January 2021, Ramanayake was sentenced to 4 years of rigorous imprisonment on the basis of contempt of court regarding his comments on the corruption of the judiciary. As a result, Ramanayake lost his seat in parliament on 7 April 2021. On 26 August 2022, Ramanayake was granted a conditional presidential pardon by President Ranil Wickremesinghe.

== Filmography ==
| Year | Film | Role | Ref. |
|---|---|---|---|
| 1987 | Obatai Priye Adare | Sarath 'Malli' | |
| 1988 | Ko Hathuro | Dancer | |
| 1988 | Durga | Thug | |
| 1990 | Jaya Kothanada | | |
| 1990 | Chandi Raja | Trade Union leader Ranjan | |
| 1990 | Hima Gira | | |
| 1990 | Dese Mal Pipila | | |
| 1990 | Veera Udara | | |
| 1990 | Jaya Kothanada | | |
| 1990 | Christhu Charithaya | | |
| 1991 | Love In Bangkok | Jackson | |
| 1991 | Ran Hadawatha | | |
| 1991 | Mama Obe Hithawatha | | |
| 1991 | Love in Bangkok | | |
| 1992 | Rajek Wage Puthek | | |
| 1992 | Salli Thibunata Madi | | |
| 1992 | Sakvithi Raja | | |
| 1992 | Chandi Rajina | | |
| 1992 | Sinhayangeth Sinhaya | Sanjaya | |
| 1993 | Mawila Penevi Rupe Hade | John Jayapala | |
| 1993 | Come O' Go Chicago | Wickremasinghe Mudiyanselage Ranjan Karunanayake | |
| 1993 | Trishule | Ranjan | |
| 1993 | Sandarekha | Ranjan | |
| 1993 | Lagin Giyoth Aehek Na | | |
| 1993 | Juriya Mamai | David / Inspector Vijay | |
| 1993 | Sura Veera Chadiyo | Ranjan | |
| 1994 | Rajawansen Ekek | Vijay / Sugath | |
| 1994 | Nohadan Landune | | |
| 1994 | Mawbime Veerayo | | |
| 1994 | Okkoma Hondatai | Kamal Jayasekara | |
| 1994 | Hello My Darling | | |
| 1994 | Wairayen Wairaya | Detective | |
| 1995 | Inspector Geetha | Dancer | |
| 1995 | Awaragira | Priyankara Sathigala | |
| 1996 | Naralowa Holman | Jonson 'Johnny' Salgadu | |
| 1996 | Sathee | | |
| 1996 | Sura Daruwo | | |
| 1996 | Mal Hathai | | |
| 1997 | Surayo Wadakarayo | | |
| 1997 | Apaye Thappara 84000k | | |
| 1997 | Duwata Mawaka Misa | | |
| 1998 | Re Daniel Dawal Migel | Chandi Aiyya | |
| 1998 | Mohothin Mohotha | | |
| 1999 | Ayadimi Sama | Ukku Banda | |
| 1999 | Nagaran | | |
| 1999 | Bahu Bharya | Kapila | |
| 1999 | Sathyadevi | Sathyajit Walisundara 'Sathyapala Wedisinghe' | |
| 2000 | Re Daniel Dawal Migel 2 | Chandi Aiyya | |
| 2000 | Danduwama | Suranga | |
| 2001 | Oba Kohida Priye | Priyantha | |
| 2001 | Jonsun and Gonsun | Sanjay Ranasinghe | |
| 2001 | Rosa Wasanthe | Akila Sannasgala | |
| 2002 | Parliament Jokes | Lavaris 'Podi Eka' | |
| 2002 | Pissu Double | Jackie | |
| 2003 | Vala In London | Suranga | |
| 2003 | Sundarai Adare | Murderer | |
| 2003 | Pissu Trible | Gunda | |
| 2003 | Yakada Pihatu | Romesh Jayawardena | |
| 2005 | One Shot One | Vijaya 'One Shot' | |
| 2005 | Alu Yata Gini | | |
| 2006 | Hiripoda Wassa | Cameo appearance | |
| 2006 | Supiri Balawatha | Nishshanka | |
| 2006 | Nilambare | Nirwan | |
| 2009 | Leader | Leader | |
| 2009 | Paya Enna Hiru Se | Suren and Suraj | |
| 2010 | Suwanda Denuna Jeewithe | Cameo appearance | |
| 2011 | Kiwwada Nahi Nokiwwada Nahi | Kalana | |
| 2012 | Jeevithe Lassanai | Wishwa | |
| 2013 | Sri Siddhartha Gautama | King Suddhodana | |
| 2013 | Raja Horu | Mahesh | |
| 2014 | Rupantharana | Moorthi | |
| 2014 | Ranja | Ranja / Ranjan | |
| 2014 | Parapura | Madhava / Suranimala | |
| 2015 | Pravegaya | Office Manager | |
| 2016 | Sinhaya | Weerasinghe 'Satyamithra' | |
| 2016 | Maya 3D | Maya | |
| 2016 | Hero Nero | Cameo appearance | |
| 2017 | Dr. Nawariyan | Nirwan 'Nawariyan' Senanayake | |
| 2018 | Yalu Malu Yalu 2 | Cheruka Weerakoon | |
| 2022 | The Game | Vijay | |
| TBD | Kondadeniye Hamuduruwo | Ven. Kondadeniye Thero | |
| TBA | Parasakthi † | | |
| 2026 | O.I.C Gadafi † | | |
| TBA | Tikiri Kumaruge Mulleriya Satana † | Veediya Bandara | |

=== As director ===
| Year | Film |
|---|---|
| 2002 | Parliament Jokes |
| 2005 | One Shot |
| 2009 | Leader |
| 2019 | Dr. Nawariyan |
| 2026 | O.I.C Gadafi |

== YouTube ==
| Year | Video Title | Role | Ref. |
| 2026 | මැර Talks 2 | @BlokandDino | @RanjanRamanayakeSL | Gehan Blok & Dino Corera | BIG BOSS | |

== Awards ==
Ranjan Ramanayake awards and nominations
Awards and nominations
| Award | Wins | Nominations |
| Slim Nelson | 15 | 15 |
| Sarasaviya | 9 | 9 |
| SIGNIS | 2 | 2 |
| Derana | 3 | 3 |

Totals (Note: Certain award groups do not simply award one winner. They acknowledge several different recipients, have runners-up, and have third place. Since this is a specific recognition and is different from losing an award, runner-up mentions are considered wins in this award tally. For simplification and to avoid errors, each award in this list has been presumed to have had a prior nomination.)
- Wins: 28
- Nominations: 28

Ramanayake has won the Sarasaviya Most Popular Actor Award 4 times.

- Sarasaviya – Lux Awards – Most popular Upcoming Actor – 1990.
- Sarasaviya – Most popular New Actor – 1990.
- Sarasaviya Awards – Most Popular Film – 2002.
- Sarasaviya Awards – Most Popular Actor – 2001– 2005.
- Sarasaviya Awards – Best Actor – 2006.
- Signis Salutation – 2007 – Creative Performance (Male)- Nilambare.
- Signis Salutation – 2010 – Creative Performance (Male)- Paya enna hiruse.
- Slim Nielsen Peoples Actor of the Year, for the 10th consecutive year in 2016, 2007, 2008, 2010, 2011, 2012, 2013, 2014, 2015, 2016, 2017, 2022, 2023.
- Slim Nielsen Peoples Awards - for the 4th consecutive year in 2016. The Actor of the Youth Choice – 2013, 2014, 2015,2016, 2017.
- Sirasa Dancing Stars – Finalist Dancing Stars.
- 1st Derana Film Awards 2011 – Most popular Actor.
- 3rd Derana Film Awards 2015 – Most Popular Actor.
- 5th Derana Film Awards 2017 – Most Popular Actor.
- 8th Derana Film Awards 2022 – Most Popular Actor.

== See also ==
- List of political families in Sri Lanka
