= Siri Daladagamanaya =

- Sinhala: සිරි දළදාගමනය
- Directed by: Sanath Abeysekara
- Written by: Udayakantha Warnasuriya
- Produced by: E.A.P Films
- Starring: Prasadi Samarakone; Heshan Manula
- Cinematography: Suminda Weerasinghe; K. D. Dayananda
- Edited by: Ravindra Guruge; Ajith Ramanayake
- Music by: Ranga Dassanayake
- Production companies: Prasad Color Lab, Chennai
- Distributed by: E.A.P Films
- Release date: 4 March 2014
- Country: Sri Lanka
- Language: Sinhala
- Box office: 11 LKR Crores (in 71 days)

Siri Daladagamanaya (Sinhala: සිරි දළදාගමනය) is a 2014 Sri Lankan Sinhalese epic historical film directed by Sanath Abeysekara and produced by Soma Edirisinghe for EAP Films. Starring Prasadi Samarakone and Heshan Manula, the film is also played by Jeevan Kumaratunga, Geetha Kumarasinghe, Dilhani Ekanayake, Sriyantha Mendis and Wasantha Dukgannarala. Music composed by Ranga Dassanayake. Film screened in 50 EAP theatres island wide. It is the 1203rd Sri Lankan film in the Sinhalese cinema.

The film revolves around the early chronicles after death of Buddha, where the sacred tooth relic transferred to Sri Lanka from India by Prince Dantha and Princess Hemamala.

== Plot ==
The story begins with the Maha Parinirvana of Buddha, his body was cremated in a sandalwood pyre at Kusinara in India and his remains were retrieved by many regional kings and arahats. Buddha's left canine tooth was retrieved by Arahat Kshema and he gave it to King Brahmadatta. The tooth became a royal possession in his dynasty and was kept in the city of Dantapuri. After 800 years of Buddha's parinirvana, the Holy Tooth came into the possession of King Guhaseeva of Kalinga (played by Jeevan Kumaratunga) with the heartiest rituals, worships and beliefs. However, the tale of Holy Tooth was spread so fast and many regional kings start to ascend it and rule the whole India. King Paandu (played by Sriyantha Mendis), who is a Hindu worshipper meet Guhasiva and said to stop foolish believing of Buddha's body parts and worship a human tooth.

With that, King Guhasiva handed the Holy Tooth to King Paandu to see the miracle of it. However, with the belief of Hindui and Jain monks, he decided to destroy the relic, and ordered to it brought to the city. With all miracles occurred and in destroyable relic, King Paandu converted to Buddhism and start to worship to the relic. Another rural leader, King Ksheeradara (played by Mark Samson) heard the news that Paandu has also converted to Buddhism, he went with his army to attack Paandu to take the relic and become its sole survivor. The invaders were killed by King Paandu and allies, and King Ksheeradara died at the battle.

The prince Dantha (played by Heshan Manula), who is the son of King Udeni is a beloved Buddhist that always came to worship the sacred tooth to Guhasiva's kingdom. King Guhaseeva's daughter princess Hemamala (played by Prasadi Samarakoon) also gets attracted to her and with the blessings of both father kings, Dantha marries Hemamala. The prince was known as Dantha and the princess as Hemamala. In the meantime, after King Ksheeradara had died in the war, his two sons Prince Ksheerajanthu (played by Wasantha Dukgannarala) and, Prince Ksheerabhishana (played by Gayan Wickramathilake) start to attack King Guhaseeva. They successfully defeat the king and conquer his kingdom, but fail to capture the Holy Tooth. Before the attack entered the city, King Guhasiva was able to send Dantha and Hemamala out of the city, with the relic secretly and tell them to flee Lankadweepa, ruling by Guhasiva's friend King Mahesena. But prince get to know about it and start to follow them. With miracle incidents, they escaped from the army. Hemamali hid the relic in her hair ornament and fled from the army. During the flee, the relic got disappeared. A cobra has been taken the relic to Kingdom of Naaga and the Naaga king (played by Chandana Wickramasinghe) and queen (played by Anusha Damayanthi) start to worship the relic. However, with the help of an Arhat (played by Madhumadhawa Aravinda), the relic kindly taken by Naagas and handed back to Dantha and Hemamala. Finally they get in to a boat given by the miracle of Arahat and move to the Lankadweepa.

After they land to Lankadweepa from port of Lankapattana, they start to find the Sinhalese king to give the relic. At their arrival, the country is ruling by King Kithsirimevan (played by Udara Rathnayake), the son of king Mahasena. Hemamala and Dantha meet the king and handed over the Holy Relic to him. The miracle happened to prove the worthiness and greatness of the relic to Simhaladweepa people.

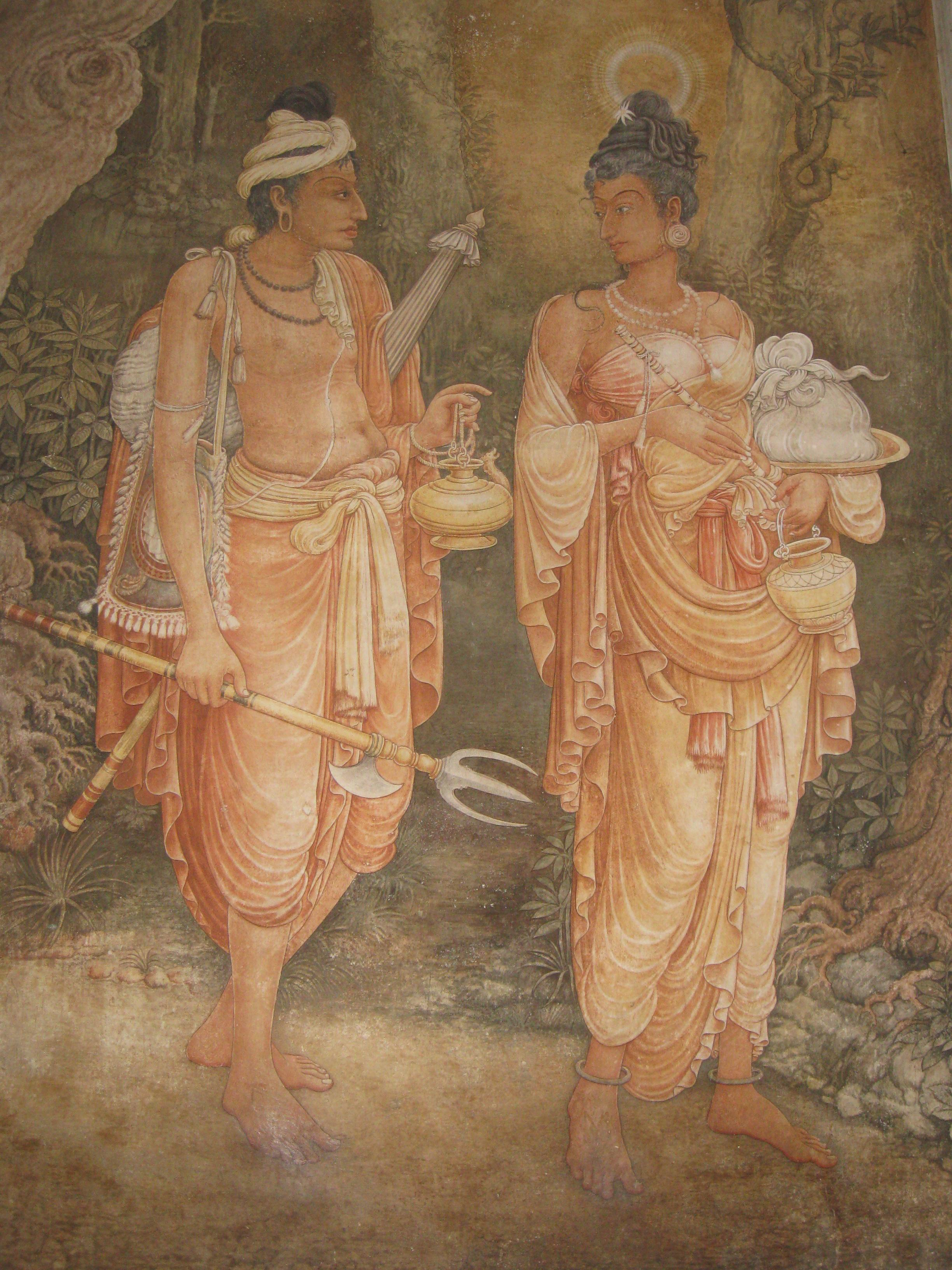
Wall painting at Kelaniya Temple of Princess Hemamali and her husband, Prince Dantha which she carried Gautama Buddha's tooth relic hidden in her hair to Sri Lanka. - Painting by Solias Mendis

== Cast ==
- Jeevan Kumaratunga as King Guhasiva
- Geetha Kumarasinghe as Queen of King Giri Aba
- Dilhani Ekanayake as Queen of King Guhasiva
- Prasadi Samarakoon as Princess Hemamala
- Heshan Manula as Prince Dantha
- Sriyantha Mendis as King Paandu
- Wasantha Dukgannarala as Prince Ksheerajanthu
- Mark Samson as King Ksheeradara
- Madhumadhawa Aravinda as Arahat monk
- Gayan Wickramathilake as Prince Ksheerabhishana
- Chinthaka Kulatunga as Purohitha
- Kamal Deshapriya as King Giri Aba
- Udara Rathnayake as King Kirti Sri Megavanna or Kithsirimevan
- Anusha Damayanthi as Naaga Queen
- Chandana Wickramasnghe as Naaga King
- Vishwa Lanka as Maha Senevi
- Srinath Maddumage as Relic thrasher
- Gunadasa Madhurasinghe as Drum announcer
- Jayantha Atapattu as Sonuththara, the palace guard
- Piyumi Boteju as Flower girl
- Denuwam Senadhi as Palace guard
- D.B. Gangodathenna as Maha Manthri
- G.R Perera as Purohitha
- Lucien Bulathsinhala as Cameo appearance
- Hyacinth Wijeratne as Cameo appearance
- Saman Almeida as Cameo appearance

== Soundtrack ==
No.	Title	Singer(s)	Length
1.	"Kema Nirindu"	Nanda Malini
2.	"Siri Dalada Mahime"	Ishak Beg
3.	"Anothaththaye Suwanda"	Uresha Ravihari
4.	"Asiri Bala Wewa"	Sunil Edirisinghe

== See also ==
- List of Asian historical drama films
