= Mage Yalu Malu =

- Sinhala: මගේ යාළු මාළු
- Directed by: Lal Priyadewa; Sudesh Wasantha Pieris
- Written by: Srilal Priyadeva
- Produced by: Janitha Marasinghe
- Starring: Lithum Marasinghe; Chandani Seneviratne; Chillie Thilanka
- Cinematography: Buddhika Mangala
- Edited by: Anura Bandara
- Music by: Edward Jayakody
- Production company: Janitha Films
- Distributed by: CEL-Ridma Circuit
- Release date: 22 January 2015
- Country: Sri Lanka
- Language: Sinhala

Mage Yalu Malu (Sinhala: මගේ යාළු මාළු) is a 2015 Sri Lankan Sinhala children's drama film co-directed by Lal Priyadewa and Sudesh Wasantha Pieris and produced by Janitha Marasinghe for Janitha Films. It stars kid Lithum Marasinghe and singer Chillie Thilanka in lead roles along with Chandani Seneviratne and Sarath Chandrasiri. Music composed by Edward Jayakody. It is the 1220th Sri Lankan film in the Sinhala cinema. The sequel to the film Yalu Malu Yalu 2 was released in 2018.

Film has two separate plots. The film revolves around a little boy, who has a relationship with a dolphin, and also a young man comes from abroad and lives secretly to his brother. The film successfully marked 50 days in silver screen.

== Cast ==
- Lithum Marasinghe as Lithum Sukiri
- Chandani Seneviratne as Sukiri's Granny
- Chillie Thilanka as Sanjaya
- Sarath Chandrasiri as Driver
- D.B. Gangodathenna as Jayakody
- Jeevan Handunnetti as Chaminda
- Denuwan Senadhi as Kasun
- Piumi Boteju as Kaveesha's mother

== Soundtrack ==
No.	Title	Singer(s)	Length
1.	"Mage Yalu Malu"	Saduni Piyumika, Adithya Bandara, Diyas Sanvidu
2.	"Ale Dole Peenan Nai"	Edward Jayakody
