= Dadabima =

Dadabima දඩබිම
- Directed by: Louis Vanderstraaten
- Written by: Louis Vanderstraaten
- Produced by: Hanako Films
- Starring: Chanky Ipalawatta; Nimal Sumanasekara; Anusha Damayanthi; Robin Fernando; Tissa Wijesurendra
- Edited by: Srilal Priyadeva
- Distributed by: Second circuit Empire Cinemas
- Release date: 30 June 2000
- Country: Sri Lanka
- Language: Sinhala

Dadabima (The Hunting Ground) (Sinhala: දඩබිම) is a 2000 Sri Lankan Sinhala adult drama film directed by Louis Vanderstraaten and produced by Pradeep Palihawadana for Hanako Films. It stars Chanky Ipalawatta, Nimal Sumanasekara and Anusha Damayanthi in lead roles along with Robin Fernando and Tissa Wijesurendra. It is the 935th Sri Lankan film in the Sinhala cinema.

== Cast ==
- Nimal Sumanasekara as Baladasa
- Chanky Ipalawatta as Wickrama
- Anusha Damayanthi
- Robin Fernando
- Tissa Wijesurendra
- Mark Samson as Jumbo
- Wasantha Kumaravila
- Wilson Karunaratne as Baladasa's associate
- Janesh Silva
- Kapila Sigera
- Upali Keerthisena
- Michelle Reimers as Tina
- Dhammika Pushpakumara
- Sanath Imbulamure
- Nalika Samaraweera
- Milton Kumaraperuma
- Lakmal Fonseka
