= Singa Machan Charlie =

- Sinhala: සිංග මචං චාර්ලි
- Directed by: Lal Weerasinghe
- Written by: Lal Weerasinghe
- Based on: Lal Weerasinghe
- Produced by: Raj Ranasinghe
- Starring: Lal Weerasinghe; Tennyson Cooray; Anusha Damayanthi; Suraj Mapa
- Cinematography: Sajeewa Sankalpa
- Edited by: Sajeewa Sankalpa
- Music by: Sajeewa Sankalpa
- Release date: 30 December 2015
- Country: Sri Lanka
- Language: Sinhala

Singa Machan Charlie (Sinhala: සිංග මචං චාර්ලි) is a 2015 Sri Lankan Sinhala action comedy film directed by Lal Weerasinghe and produced by Raj Ranasinghe. It stars Tennyson Cooray, Lal Weerasinghe, and Anusha Damayanthi in lead roles with Sando Harris and Suraj Mapa. It is the 1242nd Sri Lankan film in the Sinhala cinema. This film brought debut acting for popular actress Dilani Abeywardana's daughter Kaveesha Kavindi.

== Cast ==
- Tennyson Cooray as Charlie
- Anusha Damayanthi as Chami
- Lal Weerasinghe as Ramesh
- Suraj Mapa as Romeo
- Udayanthi Kulathunga as Isha
- Sando Harris as Sergeant Rivilsan
- Kaveesha Kavindi
- Nandana Hettiarachchi
- Mark Samson
- Anrua Bandara Rajaguru
- Vishaka Siriwardana
- Damitha Saluwadana

== Soundtrack ==
No.	Title	Singer(s)	Length
1.	"Hithakin Hadu Kandulu"	H. R. Jothipala, Sujatha Aththanayake
2.	"Ding Ding Hada Gahuna"	Chethana Ranasinghe, Kasun Pasquel
3.	"Pem Mal Mala"	Ishak Beg, Moine Begham
4.	"Mal Pethi Wage"	Chethana Ranasinghe, Kasun Pasquel
