= Bheeshanaye Athuru Kathawak =

Bheeshanaye Athuru Kathawak භීෂණයේ අතුරු කතාවක්
- DVD poster
- Directed by: Amaranath Jayathilake
- Written by: Amaranath Jayathilake
- Based on: Novel by Nihal P. Jayatunga
- Produced by: Film Vision
- Starring: Nita Fernando; Cletus Mendis; Vishaka Siriwardana
- Cinematography: Lal Wickremarachchi
- Edited by: Elmo Halliday
- Music by: Priyanjit Wijesekara
- Distributed by: NFC- MPI Circuit
- Release date: 19 February 2008
- Country: Sri Lanka
- Language: Sinhala

Bheeshanaye Athuru Kathawak (A Drop in the Reign of Terror) (Sinhala: භීෂණයේ අතුරු කතාවක්) is a 2003 Sri Lankan Sinhala action thriller film directed by Amaranath Jayathilake and produced by himself with the funds of NFC Films. It stars Nita Fernando and Cletus Mendis in lead roles along with Vishaka Siriwardana and Madhuranga Chandimal. Music composed by Priyanjit Wijesekara. The film also screened at International Film Festival, Rotterdam. It is the 1017th Sri Lankan film in the Sinhala cinema.

== Cast ==
- Nita Fernando as Mrs. Somadasa
- Cletus Mendis as Akman
- Vishaka Siriwardana as Allan Nona
- Mahendra Perera
- Wilson Karunaratne
- G.R Perera as Somadasa
- Sarath Kothalawala as Revolutionary Leader
- Miyuri Samarasinghe as Sopina
- Madhuranga Chandimal as Panduka
- Sandun Wijesiri as Gunaratna
- Dayasiri Hettiarachchi as Police inspector
- Anushka Nilanjani Ekanayaka as Manjula
- Nirosha Lakmali as Krishanthi
- Dinendra Ratanayke as Devinda
- Thilakaratna Liyanage as Politician
- Chandrika Munasingha as Magilin
- Chandrika Perera as Jane
- Amarakoon Arachchi as Chied editor
- Nimal Munasingha as Chuti
