= Sakvithi Dadayama =

- Sinhala: සක්විති දඩයම
- Directed by: Sumith Galhena
- Written by: Sumith Galhena
- Produced by: N.C. Vithanage
- Starring: Vijaya Nandasiri; Arjuna Kamalanath; Anusha Damayanthi
- Cinematography: Yapa Wijeybandara
- Music by: Farhan Shah
- Distributed by: CEL Theatres
- Release date: 12 January 2012
- Country: Sri Lanka
- Language: Sinhala

Sakvithi Dadayama (Sinhala: සක්විති දඩයම) is a 2012 Sri Lankan Sinhala comedy thriller film directed by Sumith Galhena and produced by N.C. Vithanage. It stars Vijaya Nandasiri and Arjuna Kamalanath in lead roles along with Anusha Damayanthi and Rex Kodippili. Music composed by Farhan Shah. Amila Nadeeshani and Nuwan Gunawardana involved as singers. It is the 1168th Sri Lankan film in the Sinhala cinema.

== Cast ==
- Vijaya Nandasiri as Maximus aka Mixi
- Arjuna Kamalanath as Jackson aka Jackie
- Anusha Damayanthi as Senuri
- Rex Kodippili as Cyril
- Maureen Charuni
- Susila Kottage
- Keerthi Ranjith Peiris
- Nandana Hettiarachchi as Piyadasa aka Piyaa
