= Saman Chandranath Weerasinghe =

Sri Lankan journalist and lyricist (1944-2022)

- සමන් චන්ද්‍රනාත් වීරසිංහ
- Born: Saman Chandranath Weerasinghe; 5 July 1947; Moratuwa, Ceylon
- Died: 15 February 2022 (aged 74); Colombo National Hospital, Sri Lanka
- Citizenship: Sri Lankan
- Education: Prince of Wales College, Moratuwa
- Occupations: Journalist; lyricist; poet; novelist
- Years active: 1969–2021
- Notable work: Lyrics
- Spouse: Dayalatha Weerasinghe
- Children: 3
- Parent: Wimal Weerasinghe (father)
- Relatives: Bharathi Weerasinghe (brother)

Saman Chandranath Weerasinghe (5 July 1947 – 15 February 2022: සමන් චන්ද්‍රනාත් වීරසිංහ), was a Sri Lankan journalist, lyricist, poet, and novelist. Considered one of the most iconic and prolific lyricists ever produced in the country, he contributed to more than 2,000 songs in a career that spanned more than five decades.

== Personal life ==
He was born on 5 July 1947 in Moratuwa, Sri Lanka. His father Wimal Weerasinghe was an Editor-in-Chief of Lankadeepa newspaper. He studied science subjects at the Prince of Wales College, Moratuwa in English medium. But after S.W.R.D Bandaranaike made Sinhala as the official language, he lost the school life. At that time he had a serious car accident and was at home for about 1 1/2 years. It was during that time that he became more interested in writing. When Saman was out of school due to a language problem, his father went to Mapalagama Vipulasara Thera where he studied arts at the Paramadhamma Chethiya Pirivena in Ratmalana for 4 months. After that he went to the Pinwatta Pirivena in Panadura for A/Ls. When he was going to the Pirivena to do A/Ls, the monk who taught Sinhala asked a question about a renowned book and asked "why is it a masterpiece?". But Saman simply answered, 'That book is not a great book.' After that rift, he lost his education at pirivena.

His brother Bharathi Weerasinghe is also a journalist and creative writer.

He was married to longtime partner Dayalatha Weerasinghe. The couple had three children. The eldest daughter, Tikiri Kumari is working at a music institute. His second daughter, Nadee Kumari is a music teacher. His son, Chamikara is a Deputy News Editor of the "Daily News". His nephew Saman Mendis is a renowned photographer.

Weerasinghe died on 15 February 2022 at the age of 74 while receiving treatment at the Colombo National Hospital for a longtime prevailing illness. His remains were initially kept at the ‘Restpect’ Jayaratne Parlour in Borella from 10 am and later moved to his residence No. 60, Fonseka Road, ‘Lakshapathiya’, Moratuwa. The funeral was held at 4 pm on 17 February 2022 at the Borella Cemetery.

== Career ==
As a child, he wrote the short story Tikiri Kathawak with a plot where the protagonist commits suicide amidst an anxious question that thieves have broken into the bitter gourd vine that he has planted in his field. After seeing this, his father tore it up and threw it away by saying that “Saman writes about how people live in the midst of problems. Not how to die". He first wrote a poetry called 'Piyaa Putha' for the Lankadeepa newspaper. After that he wrote a play for 'Rasavahini' magazine. Mahanama Dissanayake intervened and published this play as four or six parts in Rasavahini magazine.

He started his career as a freelance journalist with the Lankadeepa newspaper in December 1969. Cyrus Surendra, who worked for the Lankadeepa newspaper wrote a column entitled 'Kaalaye Satahan' died suddenly. At that time, Saman was a student at the Pinwatta Pirivena, where he was asked to continue Surendra's column. He worked sporadically in Lankadeepa until 1984. The main reason for this was that Lankadeepa had surrendered to political forces several times. Saman who was angry like a snake when he saw injustice, first left Lankadeepa in 1975. He was removed from office under the then Sri Lanka Freedom Party government. Shortly afterwards, he rejoined the editorial board of Lankadeepa. At the time, the Times of Ceylon Limited (TCL) was a state-owned enterprise controlled by the United National Party government. He resigned as assistant editor again in 1984, shortly before the entire TCL closed.

Later he held a number of positions in the Dinamina newspaper too. He was also the Vice President of the Songwriters' Forum, which was formed in the early 1990s. He was involved in a trade union struggle under the Intellectual Property Act and was the feature editor and co-editor of 'Silumina' newspaper. He was the Consultant Editor of Dinamina and a sub editor of Janatha newspapers at the time of retirement.

Weerasinghe made his first writings as a lyricist when he was in school. The song he wrote for a devotional song competition held in Panadura at that time was sung by Neela Wickramasinghe, who was a school girl at the time. He also composed the first radio song of Sunil Edirisinghe, "Waadakayaneni". His first radio song was 'Hetak Gange Sithala' composed for a 1971 simple song program for Punsiri Soysa. Later, he wrote many of Soysa's all-time favorite hits such as "Sewwandiyakata Pem Banda", "Rusiru Dasunak", "Biduwak Iwasa Ahanna" and "Ganga Diyawela Gala". Meanwhile, he wrote the first geometrical song in Sri Lanka, titled "Samakoni Thrikonayaki" for Dayarathna Ranatunga.

His first lyrics broadcast on the radio was a patriotic song titled "Muthuketa Mathuwuna Maha Sayurai" which was sung by C.L. Fonseka to music by Rohitha Wijesuriya. Veteran singer Malini Bulathsinhala enters the field as a solo singer with the song written by Weerasinghe, titled "Sanda Madale Sita" which was included in a radio drama. Meanwhile, he also wrote the radio anthem "Nawa Rasa Dhara" to add patriotic feeling. The music of the song was composed by Sarath Dassanayake. Saman-Sarath duo then made several collaborative works for more than two decades which include the popular song "Hima Renu Watena".

The song "Sondura Mata Samudenna" was composed by Weerasinghe and was included in the programs 'Prabuddha Gee' and 'Ran Kethai Kammalai' on the National Radio in the 1970s. The purpose of the Prabuddha Gee, which was sung between 5.45 - 6.00 am daily before the morning news at that time, was to create a patriotic feeling among the general public based on the existing Vaga Sangrama project. The patriotic sentiment of the labour force was exaggerated in the songs he wrote such as: "Nabara Goyamata Rahas" which was sung by Gunadasa Kapuge.

Saman also co-wrote the lyrics for the film 'Hadawatha Mal Yayai' with Sarath Dassanayake's son Ranga Dasanayake. Apart from being a lyricist, he also worked professionally as a consultant in the art of advertising. He chaired the National Lotteries Board's Advertising Procurement Committee for some years.

== Filmography ==
He has contributed by writing many popular film songs since 1974.

Year	Film
1974	Sheela
1982	Major Sir
1984	Adara Geethaya
1984	Hithwathiya
1986	Devduwa
1988	Angulimala
1990	Madhu Sihina
1992	Sakkara Suththara
1992	Sinha Raja
1992	Rajek Wage Puthek
1993	Chaya
1993	Yasasa
1993	Bambasara Bisaw
1993	Sandarekha
1994	Sujatha
1994	Athma
1994	Yuwathipathi
1996	Hitha Hondanam Waradin Na
1996	Mana Mohini
1996	Mal Hathai
1998	Girl Friend
2000	Danduwama
2000	Anuragaye Ananthaya
2000	Pem Kekula
2002	Seethala Gini Kandu
2003	Sudu Salu
2004	Left Right Sir
2010	Hadawatha Mal Yayai
2012	Wassane Senehasa
2013	Seetha Man Awa
2013	Raja Horu
2015	Sanjana
2015	My Name Is Bandu
2018	Athuru Mithuru Hari Apuru
2022	The Game
TBD	Kele Handa

== Notable lyrics ==
Weerasinghe wrote more than 2,000 lyrics for singers across several generations.

- Bidak Redi Asan
- Biduwak Iwasa
- Bindu Bindu
- Chandani Payala Rathriye
- Ganga Diyawel Gala
- Gauthama Budu Guna
- Hathara Watin Kalukaragena
- Hima Renu Vetena
- Kavikariye Sindu Kiyana
- Kiyay Mihiri Katha
- Kovula Amathanu Na
- Lassanai Adare
- Latha Madullak Katha Karanwa
- Mata Thani Na
- Midule Mal Sooriyagaha
- Monalisa
- Nambara Goyamata
- Nav Negala Awidin
- Peli Peli Ganu Lamai
- Randu Wewi Yalu Wewi
- Samakoni Thrikonayaki
- Sandaleka
- Sanda Madale Sita
- Sanduni Ai Sudu Kopul
- Sathara Vatin Kalukaragena
- Sithaka Kohe Thibunado
- Sodura Mata Samu Denna
- Sudu Rosai Muhuna Pura
- Valuka Kathare
- Waadakayaneni
- Warusawe Walakulu
