= Mark Samson =

Sri Lankan actor (1956–2019)

- මාක් සැම්සන්
- Born: Thelge Marcus Samson Peiris; February 29, 1956; Panadura, Sri Lanka
- Died: January 19, 2019 (aged 62)
- Occupations: Actor, Stunt Director
- Years active: 1988–2017
- Children: 3

Thelge Marcus Samson Peiris, popularly known as Mark Samson (born February 29, 1956 – died 19 January 2019 as මාක් සැම්සන් [Sinhala]) was a Sri Lankan actor in films and television, and a stunt director. Considered one of the best villains in Sinhala cinema, Samson has acted in more than 40 films across many genres primarily as an antagonist.

He died on 19 January 2019, at the age of 63, of a heart attack.

== Cinema career ==
Samson made his debut cinematic appearance in the 1988 film Ayya Nago. He was introduced into silver screen by Wilson Karu. He continued to act in more than 45 Sinhala films across many genres, primarily as a villain. Some of his notable actings came through Raja Daruwo, Rodaya and Siri Daladagamanaya. His last performance was in teledrama Urumayaka Aragalaya as a high-rank English Officer in colonial Ceylon.

== Filmography and stunt coordination ==
- No. denotes the Number of Sri Lankan film in the Sri Lankan cinema.

Year	No.	Film	Roles	Ref.
1988		Ayya Nago		
1988		Amme Oba Nisa		
1989		Shakthiya Obai Amme	Buddhi	
1989		Okkoma Rajawaru		
1990		Sebalilyo		
1990		Dese Mal Pipila		
1990		Jaya Shakthi		
1990		Sambudhu Mahima		
1990		Hondin Naththam Narakin		
1991		Obata Pamanai Adare		
1991		Salambak Handai		
1991		Cheriyo Doctor	Mark	
1992		Ranabime Weeraya		
1992		Raja Daruwo	Koti Wilbert	
1992		Viyaru Minisa		
1992		Sinha Raja		
1992		Okkoma Kanapita		
1992		Oba Mata Wiswasai	Shirley	
1992		Suranimala		
1992		Sinhayangeth Sinhaya	Amaradasa Pallangey	
1993		Saagara Thilina		
1993		Bambasara Bisaw		
1994		Nohadan Kumariyo	Reggie	
1994		Love 94	Bounty Hunter	
1995		Vijay Saha Ajay	Samson	
1995		Edath Chandiya Adath Chandiya	Leanah	
1995		Inspector Geetha	Mark	
1995		Rodaya	Baby	
1995		Cheriyo Captain	Alphonsus friend	
1996		Sura Daruwo		
1998		Sagara Peraliya		
2000		Dadabima	Jumbo	
2001		Pissu Puso	Tony	
2002		Seethala Gini Kandu		
2002		Pissu Double	Club thug	
2003		Aladinge Waldin	Prison mentor	
2004		Nohadan Amme	Reggie	
2004		Samawenna Maa Raththarane		
2006		Rana Hansi	Sylvester	
2014		Siri Daladagamanaya	King Ksheeradara	
2015		My Name is Bandu	Sinhabahu's assistant	
2015		Aathma Warusha		
2015		Singa Machan Charlie		
2016		Hora Police	Lokke	
TBD		Kidnap		
TBD		Marukathara		
