= Leader (2009 film) =

- Film poster
- Sinhala: ලීඩර්
- Directed by: Ranjan Ramanayake
- Written by: Ranjan Ramanayake
- Based on: Cleatus Mendis
- Produced by: Bevan Perera; P. Arooran
- Starring: Ranjan Ramanayake; Aadeen Khan; Anusha Damayanthi; Babu Antony
- Cinematography: A.Velmurugan
- Edited by: Ajith Ramanayake; Ayesha
- Music by: Suneth Kalum
- Release date: 23 January 2009
- Country: Sri Lanka
- Language: Sinhala
- Budget: 40 Millions
- Box office: 400 SL Millions

Leader (Sinhala: ලීඩර්) is a 2009 Sri Lankan Sinhala action thriller film directed by Ranjan Ramanayake and co-produced by Bevan Perera and P. Aruran. It stars Ranjan Ramanayake and Adeen Khan, along with Babu Antony, Robin Fernando and Anusha Damayanthi. Music composed by Suneth Kelum. Public Performance Board of Sri Lanka removed some controversial political parts of the film. Leader is the film in Sinhala cinema history that had been screened with the most number of copies with 50 film theaters.

Some of the political clips were removed from the film due to Public Performance Board (PPB). The film was screened free of charge for two weeks from February 27 and producer decided to direct Rs. 1 from each ticket sold in all the theaters to Ranaviru fund. In April 2009, producer donated one day's collection of the film in all 50 theaters to the construction of Jaffna Cultural Center.

It is adopted from 1994 Hong Kong Film The Bodyguard From Beijing.

== Plot ==
Pooja is a daughter of a kind politician named Kadirgamar. Kadirgamar wins the election between with a gangster named Raguvaran. Raguvaran kills Kadirgamar in front of Pooja and threatens her.

== Cast ==
- Ranjan Ramanayake as Leader
- Adeen Khan as Pooja (Voice By Anarkali Akarsha)
- Babu Antony as Raghuwaran / Kimbulawala Soththi Siran (Voice By Prasanna Fonseka)
- Sandun Wijesiri as Kadiragamar
- Rangana Premaratne as Marcus Bandaranayake
- Robin Fernando
- Anusha Damayanthi
- Janesh Silva as Jonee
- Chathura Perera as Ismail
- Anton Jude
- Ronnie Leitch
- Jeevan Handunnetti
- D.B. Gangodathenna
- Dasun Madushanka as Pooja's brother

== Soundtrack ==
The songs were composed by Suneth Kalum. The song "Rata Rakaganna" is based on "Arjunaru Villu" from Ghilli (2004).

No.	Title	Singer(s)	Length
1.	"Sansare Charikawe"	Ranjan Ramanayake, K. Sujeewa
2.	"Jokerla Set Ekak"	Ranjan Ramanayake, Sunil Perera, Gemunu Wijesuriya
3.	"Awath Chandeta"	Ranjan Ramanayake
4.	"Rata Rakaganna"	Bachi Susan
