= Anusha Damayanthi =

Sri Lankan actress and dancer

- Born: Pussallage Anusha Damayanthi Gunathilake; 11 February 1978 (age 48); Colombo, Sri Lanka
- Education: Visakha Vidyalaya
- Occupations: Actress, Dancer
- Years active: 1996–present
- Spouse: Amila Jayathilake (m. 2022)

Pussallage Anusha Damayanthi Gunathilake, popularly known as Anusha Damayanthi (Sinhala: අනූෂා දමයන්ති) (born February 11, 1978), is an actress in Sri Lankan cinema and television. She started her career in 1996 from Cheriyo Darling and won Dance Stars Dance reality show title in 2011 which was telecast on Swarnavahini.

== Theater work ==
She has acted few stage dramas. Her first stage acting came through Indian Sagare drama directed by Sisil Gunasekara. She then acted on Vaniciye Twinsla, and Dancing Super Star.

== Television ==
She contested for the reality dance program Dance Stars Dance and won the competition.

=== Selected television series ===
- Asirimath Daladagamanaya
- Mahaviru Pandu
- Ranthaliya Walawwa
- Sanda Saavi

== Filmography ==
Year	Film	Role	Notes
1996	Cheriyo Darling	Prostitute	Her cinema debut
1997	Ege Vairaya 2		
1997	Ragaye Unusuma		
1997	Viyaru Geheniyak		
1998	Sexy Girl		
1998	Girl Friend		
1998	Ege Vairaya 3	Rasadari 'Rasa'	
1998	Akkai Nangiyi	Dancer ("Ha Ha Harida")	
1999	Koti Sana		
2000	Dadabima		
2000	Ege Vairaya 4	Surangi	
2000	Ginigath Madusamaya	Ruchirani	
2001	Balakaamaya		Best Performances - 2002 Sarasaviya Awards
2001	Sellam Kukka		
2002	Kamasutra	Nelum	
2003	Pissu Trible	Surangana	
2003	Hitha Honda Pisso	Ranitha	
2003	One Shot	Table Dancer	
2004	Clean Out	Rosalyn	
2004	Ohoma Harida	Thushari	
2004	Jolly Boys	Sanda	
2006	Samu Noganna Sugandika		
2006	Dharma Puthra	Maduri	Merit Awards - 31st Sarasaviya Awards
2006	Sonduru Wasanthe	Renuka	
2007	Mister Dana Rina		
2007	First Love Pooja		Choreographer
2007	No Problem Darling		Choreographer
2008	Ali Pancha Mage Mithura		
2008	Sura Sapa Soya		
2009	Leader		
2009	Sir Last Chance	Anu	
2011	Muthu Salamba		
2011	Thank You Berty	Matilda, Norty's wife	
2012	Sakvithi Dadayama	Senuri	
2014	Siri Daladagamanaya	Naaga Queen	
2015	Sanjana	Priya	
2015	None Mage Sudu None	Pabalu	
2015	Aathma Warusha		
2015	My Name Is Bandu	Sanju	
2015	Singa Machan Charlie	Chami	
2017	Nilanjana	Ayesha	
2019	Sikuru Yogaya		
TBD	Seethala Yuddhaya		
TBD	Ayyai Nangyi		
TBD	Elakandiye Marcus		
