= The Game (2022 film) =

2022 Sri Lankan film

- promotional poster
- Sinhala: ද ගේම්
- Directed by: Suranga de Alwis
- Written by: Nishantha Weerasinghe; Aruna Shantha; Nadeesha Samith Dias
- Produced by: Nishantha Weerasinghe
- Starring: Ranjan Ramanayake; Sriyantha Mendis; Janith Wickramage
- Cinematography: Gamini Moragollagama
- Edited by: Sky Walkar
- Music by: Sarath de Alwis
- Production company: Sangeetha Films
- Distributed by: EAP, CEL, LFD cinemas
- Release date: 16 June 2022
- Country: Sri Lanka
- Language: Sinhala

The Game (Sinhala: ද ගේම්) is a 2022 Sri Lankan Sinhala action thriller film directed by Suranga de Alwis and produced by Nishantha Weerasinghe for Sangeetha Films, and distributed by A4Movie. The film stars Ranjan Ramanayake, Sriyantha Mendis and Janith Wickramage in lead roles, whereas Buddhika Jayaratne, Dhananjaya Siriwardena and Wasantha Kumaravila made supportive roles. The film revolves around an extremist who started to assassinate a powerful aristocrat, where the theme loosely based on April 21 Easter Sunday Bombings occurred in Sri Lanka.

== Plot ==
Ajay and Vijay are two friends. They work in the police station under the OIC named Samaradiwakara. One day, an emergency phone call to Samaradiwakara says that Ajay has an information about a mysterious murder. Since Ajay was not at the police station at the time and the importance of the information, Samaradiwakara ordered Vijay to appear as Ajay and obtain the information. Reluctantly, Vijay agrees and goes to meet Ganga, who made the phone call as Ajay. There Vijay gets to know some very important information. That is, the main suspect wanted in connection with an assassination planned by an extremist gang is identified across Ganga. Meanwhile, a lady detective named Jenny pursues the extremist leader Siam. According to the information obtained by Siam and Vijay, the security forces were able to nab the main suspect wanted by the intelligence unit. Meanwhile, Vijay starts a love affair with Ganga and Ajay starts a love affair with Vijay's sister. One day Vijay is killed while this is happening. Extremist leader Siam brings Tiger with his daughter from Nuwara Eliya to Colombo to pursue his goal. Tiger behaves in such a way as to make it difficult for Siam to reach his goal as Siam prepares to assassinate a powerful aristocrat through Tiger. The film then revolves with the mission to catch Tiger.

== Cast ==
- Ranjan Ramanayake as Vijay, Tiger and Sunny
- Janith Wickramage as Ajay Gunasekara
- Sriyantha Mendis as OIC Samaradiwakara
- Buddhika Jayaratne as Geethanjana Dissanayake, State secretary for defence
- Dhananjaya Siriwardena as Dharmapriya
- Wasantha Kumaravila as Nazir Ahmed
- Tharindi Fernando as Ganga, Vijay's girlfriend
- Chathu Rajapaksa as Chathu Nanayakkara, Ajay's girlfriend
- Sando Harris as Gangster
- Ariyasena Gamage
- Lakshman Amarasekara
- Nilmini Kottegoda as Vijay's mother
- Jeevan Sapnaranga as Shaggi, the hacker
- Dulashi Nimandi as Sandali
- Thushini Fernando as Jenita, a intelligent woman
- Geethika Rajapaksa as Hotel staff member
- Tyrone Michael
- Gayan Mapalagama
- Sudesh Wasantha Peiris as Siam
- Samantha Ranga Mayadunne
- Anura Samarajeewa
- Saman Padmakumara
- Sumedha Mihiraj

== Production ==
The film marked the fifth cinema direction by Suranga de Alwis. Nadeesha Samith Dias is writing this story based on the April attack when the main script of the film was written by Nishantha Weerasinghe. The cinematographer is Gamini Moragollagama; additionally, the editing was done by Ruwan Weerasinghe, art direction by Eheliyagoda Somathilaka, and Chandrara Sugath Kumara handled costumes. Furthermore, the stunt director is Samantha Mayadunna, and the costume designer is Priyan Anura Sri. Still photography by Anura Shantha, production management by Dharshana Dissanayake and Sampath Alwis, executive production by Nishantha Weerasinghe and director's father, Sarath de Alwis joined with music direction. Uresha Ravihari, Mario Ananda and Sanka Dineth are the singers of the film. Meanwhile, director Suranga's son Jeevan Saptharanga and daughter Dulashi Nimnadi are also acting in the film.

The trailer of the film was released at the Colombo City Center and simultaneously released the film songs on 20 December 2021.

== Screening ==
The film is scheduled to be released islandwide on the 20th, but it has been suspended due to the prevailing economic crisis in the country according to the film director Suranga de Alwis. The main reason was due to fuel shortages and power cuts in the country, making it difficult to operate generators and some cinemas not having generators. The film was later released on 16 June 2022 in 70 cinemas where the premiere was held at 6 p.m. at the Liberty Cinema. This is lead actor Ranjan Ramanayake's last film before he was imprisoned. The film will be on display in Melbourne, Australia on 24 June 2022 and will be screened in New Zealand, USA, and Cannes, Italy.

The film surpassed 50 days of screen with a huge success in theaters across the country. The film received mixed review from critics, and highlighted the need for a formal screenplay and editing style as well as a star-studded actress opposite to Ranjan Ramanayake.

== Soundtrack ==
The film consists of three songs including the first item song in Sinhala cinema.

No.	Title	Lyrics	Singer(s)	Length
1.	"Ahasa Gugura Rathriye"	Saman Chandranath Weerasinghe	Sanka Dineth
2.	"Anda Manda Wee Ai None"	Chandradasa Fernando	Buddhika Ushan, Udayanga Suresh
3.	"Jeevana Me Gamana Sansare (item song)"
