= Tissa Wijesurendra =

Sri Lankan actor (1949–2020)

- Born: Don Bhathiyatissa Wijesurendra; 3 April 1949; Panadura, Sri Lanka
- Died: 11 May 2020 (aged 71); Colombo, Sri Lanka
- Education: Nalanda College Colombo
- Occupation: Film Actor
- Years active: 1970 – 2016
- Spouse: Savithri Dias
- Children: 3

Don Bhathiyatissa Wijesurendra (තිස්ස විජේසුරේන්ද්‍ර 3 April 1949 – 11 May 2020), popularly known as Tissa Wijesurendra, was a Sri Lankan actor. One of the most popular actors of the 1970s, Wijesurendra played many dramatic roles in a career spanned for four decades. An innocent lover of Sinhala cinema at one time, Wijesurendra can be described as a symbol of popular cinema.

== Personal life ==
Wijesurendra was born on 3 April 1949 in Sarikkamulla, Panadura as the eldest of the family. His father was an engineer. He was educated at Nalanda College Colombo. He qualified to become a doctor but became an actor instead.

He was married until his death to Savithri Dias Wijesurendra, a retired teacher who formerly worked at Visakha Vidyalaya. The couple had three daughters. Their daughter Surani has been involved with few television serials and has worked as a TV host. Tissa's younger brother Bandula was a photographer for Sarasavi newspaper for a long time.

Wijesurendra died on 11 May 2020, at the age of 71 while receiving treatments at Apeksha Hospital, Maharagama.

== Cinema career ==
During school times, he stayed at an uncle's house in Bambalapitiya because it was easy to attend tuition classes. That uncle worked at Ceylon Theaters where he was selected for a film. His maiden cinema appearance came through the 1971 film Kalana Mithuro directed by Kingsley Rajapakse. It was a remake of popular Hollywood film Dosthi and the reason to cast Tissa is that he and Sudhir Sawant of Dosthi looks similar. Kingsley Rajapaksa edited the name of "Batiyathissa" to suit the cinema. Tissa was allowed to star in a feature film Nim Walalla in 1970 directed by Ranjith Lal shot by a group of students at Ananda College at the same time. This film was his first screened film. It is the only feature film made by a group of school children. In the film, he was the brother of Swarna Mallawarachchi.

From the films he acted in, the first box office record was made by Tissa and Malani in the film Suhada Pethuma. Since then, Tissa-Malani era shaped the seventies. Since then, he acted in several popular film under the renowned directors: K.A.W. Perera, Amarnath Jayatilleke, Neil Rupasinghe and Chandraratne Mapitigama. After the film Suhada Pethuma, the two stars were lovers in the films Sadhana, Nila and Ran Kurullo, he also played the role as lover to many other film actresses like Geetha Kumarasinghe, Nita Fernando, Jenita Samaraweera in films like Sureka, Neela, Niluka, Sudu Paraviyo, Kalana Mithuro and Lasanda. His best contemporaries in the cinema were Vijaya Kumaranatunga, Gamini Fonseka and Tony Ranasinghe. Geetha Kumarasinghe first made her love affair with Wijesurendra with the film Lassana Kella. He is the only Sri Lankan actor to continue playing the protagonist in all films he acted in since the maiden film. He went on to make box office records in the Sinhala cinema history in seventies.

As the 1980s dawned, Wijesurendra's number of films began to decline. In 1983, he acted in the film Senehasaka Kandulu directed by Hemasiri Sellapperuma, where he and Sonia Disa played Veddah characters. Then he acted a different role in Nelum Vile Saman Malak directed by Chandraratne Mapitigama. He expected an award for this character and it premiered in India as well. However, he did not receive the award and temporarily quit cinema after frustration. In 1993, he played the older role as Sabeetha's father in the film Bambasara Bisaw.

== Filmography ==
Year	Film	Role	Ref.
1970	Nim Walalla		
1971	Kalana Mithuro		
1971	Poojithayo	Mangala	
1971	Samanala Kumariyo		
1973	Suhada Pethuma	Chandana	
1973	Sinawai Inawai		
1974	Surekha		
1974	Lasanda	Parakrama Jayawansa	
1975	Aese Idiripita		
1975	Pem Kurullo		
1975	Kohoma Kiyannada	Jagath	
1975	Lassana Kella	Anura	
1975	Sadhana		
1975	Hadawathaka Wasanthaya		
1976	Haratha Hathara		
1976	Nedeyo	Rohana	
1977	Neela		
1977	Sudu Paraviyo	Rajesh	
1977	Niluka		
1977	Niwena Ginna		
1977	Honda Hitha		
1977	Sajaa		
1978	Sithaka Suwanda	Mahesh	
1978	Deepanjali		
1978	Kumara Kumariyo	Upul	
1979	Jeewana Kandulu	Chaminda	
1979	Ran Kurullo	Rajesh	
1979	Rosa Mal Thunak	Janaka Mihindukula 'Deepal Srinath'	
1979	Anusha	Sudath Karunaratne 'Wijesinghe'	
1980	Api Dedena	Ravindra	
1981	Jeewanthi	Jayantha	
1982	Kiri Suwanda	Duncan	
1982	Sithaara		
1982	Major Sir		
1983	Senehasaka Kandulu	Nanduna	
1983	Bonikka	Prageeth Wickremasinghe	
1984	Hadawathaka Wedana		
1986	Prarthana		
1990	Hondin Nathinam Narakin		
1990	Christhu Charithaya	Simeon	
1992	Oba Mata Wishwasai	Veerabahu	
1993	Bambasara Bisaw		
1993	Nelum Saha Samanmali		
1993	Juriya Mamai	Doctor Ratnayake	
1996	Hitha Honda Nam Waradin Na		
1997	Ragaye Unusuma		
1997	Aege Wairaya 2		
1997	Viyaru Geheniyak		
1998	Aeye Obata Barai	Robert	
2000	Premilla		
2000	Dadabima		
2001	Oba Magema Wewa		
2008	Hathara Denama Soorayo remake	Mr. Samarasinghe	
2014	Rupantharana	Gilbert	
2014	Supiri Andare	Shahrukh Khan	
TBD	Adda Lanuwa Damma Kodiya		
