= Patibhana =

- Theatrical release poster
- Sinhala: පටිභාන
- Directed by: Rabin Chandrasiri
- Written by: Rabin Chandrasiri
- Produced by: Seetha De Silva
- Starring: Sampath Sri Jayasighe; Niroshan Wijesinghe; Chandrasoma Binduhewa
- Cinematography: Lalith M. Thomas
- Edited by: M. S. Aliman
- Music by: Nadeeka Guruge
- Distributed by: CEL Theatres
- Release date: 19 February 2016
- Country: Sri Lanka
- Language: Sinhala

Patibhana (Sinhala: පටිභාන) is a 2016 Sri Lankan Sinhala drama film directed by Rabin Chandrasiri and produced by Seetha De Silva. It stars Sampath Sri Jayasighe and Niroshan Wijesinghe in lead roles along with Saman Almeida and Hasinika Karalliyadda. Music composed by Nadeeka Guruge. It is the 1244th Sri Lankan film in the Sinhala cinema.

== Etymology ==
The film title Patibhana means Revealing the Truth.

== Cast ==
- Sampath Sri Jayasighe as Rev. Galle Ariyadhamma Thero 'Ariyasiri' 'Podi Sira'
- Niroshan Wijesinghe as Chief Inspector Almeida
- Chandrasoma Binduhewa as Upasaka
- Shanika Bandara as Sriyalatha aka 'Latha'
- Samson Siripala as Chief monk
- Saman Almeida as Sargent Harris
- Sarath Chandrasiri
- Hasinika Karalliyadda as Village woman
- Maneesha Namalgama as Ariyasiri's stepmother
- Nimal Yatiwella as Prison chief officer
- Rohitha Mannage as Norman
- H.T. Wilson as Mike
