= Lal Weerasinghe =

Sri Lankan actor

Lal Weerasinghe ලාල් වීරසිංහ
- Born: Lal Weerasinghe; December 17, 1963 (age 62); Nugegoda, Sri Lanka
- Occupations: Actor, Director
- Years active: 1991–present

Lal Weerasinghe (born 17 December 1963 as ලාල් වීරසිංහ [Sinhala]), is an actor and filmmaker in Sri Lankan cinema. One of the popular actors in 1990s of Sinhala cinema, Weerasinghe is currently acting in Kollywood cinema.

== Personal life ==
Weerasinghe was born on 17 December 1963 in Nugegoda, Colombo.

== Career ==
His maiden cinema acting was in 1991 film Wada Barinam Wedak Naha Directed By Late Upali Piyarthna..

In 1995, he produced the film Vijaya Saha Ajay which was directed by Roy de Silva. Then in 1996, he wrote the story and script of the film Bodyguard directed by Upali Piyarathna.

He obtained a diploma from Mumbai drama school and trained in India. His first Kollywood acting came through Suriya Udayan. After the film becomes very popular, he acted in another Tamil film Inda Nimidam directed by R.K Yesu in 2019. He also acted as a police officer in the film Thuppakki En Kadei.

His maiden cinema direction came through 2015 film Singa Machan Charlie where he also produced the film and wrote the script and story.

On 3 November 2015, he was reported to Presidential Commission of Inquiry appointed to Investigate Serious Acts of Fraud, Corruption and Abuse of Power, State resources, and Privileges (PRECIFAC) to record a statement on a matter connected to SriLankan Airlines.

In 2018, he acted in the television serial Pavathma directed by closest friend Channa Perera.

== Filmography ==
Key
| † | Denotes film or TV productions that have not yet been released |

| Year | Film | Role | Ref. |
|---|---|---|---|
| 1982 | Chathu Madura | Tissa | |
| 1985 | Chalitha Rangali | | |
| 1987 | Yukthiyada Shakthiyada | | |
| 1988 | Newatha Api Ekwemu | | |
| 1991 | Sihina Ahase Wasanthe | | |
| 1991 | Wada Barinam Wadak Na | | |
| 1991 | Asai Bayai | Anderson | |
| 1992 | Rajek Wage Puthek | | |
| 1993 | Sasara Sari Saran Thek | | |
| 1993 | Sura Veera Chandiyo | Lal | |
| 1994 | Love 94 | Suren Wickramasinghe | |
| 1995 | Vijay Saha Ajay | Ajay | |
| 1996 | Bodyguard | Shaun | |
| 1996 | Naralowa Holman | Lal | |
| 1997 | Blendings | | |
| 1997 | Ramba Saha Madhu | | |
| 2001 | Kumari Bambasara Handu Da | | |
| 2003 | Sundarai Adare | Shane Weerasinghe | |
| 2003 | Taxi Driver | | |
| 2011 | Muthu Salamba | Vishwa | |
| 2015 | Aathma Warusha | Wije | |
| 2015 | Singa Machan Charlie | Ramesh | |
| 2018 | Suriya Udayan | | |
| 2019 | Inda Nimidam | | |
| 2025 | Rosa Adare | Gun supplier | |
| TBA | Thuppakki En Kadei † | | |
| TBA | Case Number 447 † | filming | |
| TBA | Reyak Ho Peyak † | | |
