= Ran Sayura =

- Sinhala: රන් සයුර
- Directed by: Sudesh Wasantha Pieris
- Written by: Sudesh Wasantha Pieris
- Produced by: Mahitharu Films
- Starring: Wasantha Kumaravila; Himali Siriwardena; Roger Seneviratne
- Cinematography: Fine Vision Group
- Edited by: Anura Bandara
- Music by: Keshan Perera; Asela Indralal
- Release date: 16 February 2017
- Country: Sri Lanka
- Language: Sinhala

Ran Sayura is a 2017 Sri Lankan action film directed by Sudesh Wasantha Pieris and produced by J.H. Wasantha Kumara and S.A. Sanjeewa Kumara under their Mahee Tharu Films banner. The film features Wasantha Kumaravila and Roger Seneviratne as the leading actors and Himali Siriwardena as the leading actress. The film was released on 16 February 2017 in Sri Lanka. It is the 1269th Sri Lankan film in the Sinhala cinema.

== Cast ==
- Wasantha Kumaravila as Michael
- Roger Seneviratne as OIC
- Himali Siriwardena as Maari
- Susila Kottage as Katherina
- Ruwangi Rathnayake as Nirasha
- Mahinda Pathirage as Robert
- Wishwa Lanka as Suren
- Rangana Premaratne as Anton
- Premadasa Vithanage as Liyana Mahaththaya
- Hemantha Iriyagama as Constable
- Jeevan Handunetti as Gunda
- Isuru Lokuhettiarachchi as Punchi Baby
- Sanjeewani Weerasinghe as Maari's mother
- Sinethi Akila as Sandali

== Production Team ==
- Art Direction - Sarath Samara Wickrama
- Colour Designer - Ananda Bandara
- Sound Design - Sashika Ruwan
- Visual Effects - Chaminda Lakmal
- Director of Photography - Gamini Moragollagama
- Stunt Director - Wasantha Kumaravila

== Soundtrack ==
No.	Title	Singer(s)	Length
1.	"Mage Dasa Pura"	Suranji Shyamali
2.	"Ran Sayura Wage"	Suranji Shyamali, Mahindra Pathirage, Jeevan Handunetti, Sudesh Wasantha Peiris
