= Jeevithe Lassanai =

- promotion poster
- Sinhala: ජීවිතේ ලස්සනයි
- Directed by: Sudesh Wasantha Peris
- Written by: Sunil T Fernando
- Based on: Hindi Film Joru Ka Ghulam
- Produced by: Sunil T Films
- Starring: Ranjan Ramanayake; Tennyson Cooray; Ananda Wickramage; Anton Jude
- Cinematography: Gamini Moragollagama
- Edited by: Kumarasiri de Silva
- Music by: Asela Endralal
- Production companies: Prasad Color Lab, Chennai
- Distributed by: EAP Theatres
- Release date: 21 December 2012
- Running time: 117 minutes
- Country: Sri Lanka
- Language: Sinhala

Jeevithe Lassanai (Sinhala: ජීවිතේ ලස්සනයි, lit. 'Life is beautiful') is a 2012 Sri Lankan Sinhala comedy film directed by Sudesh Wasantha Peris and produced by Sunil T Fernando for Sunil T Films. It stars Ranjan Ramanayake, Tennyson Cooray and Ananda Wickramage in lead roles along with Maheshi Madusanka and Anton Jude. Music composed by Asela Endralal.

== Plot ==
A wealthy businessman Aaron Mudalali (Ananda) has four uncontrollable daughters, named : Dinethra (Maheshi), Subodhani (Menaka), Devumini (Nethu), and Kavya (Ruwangi), who refuse to be disciplined, and be married due to several opinions and attitudes. One day, a wealthy young man Wishwa (Ranjan) who is in love with the youngest daughter, Kavya, arrives to Mudalali's house and asked him to give permission to marry her. But, Mudalali refused saying that he was required to marry all four daughters at the same time at same wedding, otherwise he would die soon. So, Mudalali handed over Wishwa to locate three other grooms for his other three daughters, otherwise no marriage would take place. With all four refusing to marry anyone where they have several problems with boys.

The eldest daughter, Dinethra is a kind hearted girl with all her life devoted to library and books. Wishwa tried to match her with his best friend Kukula (Tennyson) and Kukula involve in many incidents to success his love. The second eldest Subodhani already loves a guy, but he has another girl, so she said that she only will marry him, otherwise no wedding would take place. Wishwa and Kukula started to break her fiancée and make a relationship between Subodhani and him. The third eldest Devumini is completely different from all three. She is tough looking and would only marry a boy if he agrees to obey four rules. These rules are;

- The parents of the boy should be dead.
- The boy should be a good cook.
- The boy should have a degree.
- The boy should give the permission to her to become an actress.

With all these rules, its getting hard to find a boy who obey these rules. After several unsuccessful boys, Wishwa found a salesman B.A. Chakrawarthi (Chathura), who agrees to obey any rule, even more than four, if he gets to marry Devumi. Finally, Wishwa had found four boys including him for the four girls and the marriages were confirmed.

== Cast ==
- Ranjan Ramanayake as Wishwa (U.N.P. Wishwa)
- Tennyson Cooray as Kalyana / Ku.Ku.La (Kude Kudu Laos)
- Ananda Wickramage as Aaron Mudalali (J.V.P. Aaron)
- Chathura Perera as B.A. Chakrawarthi
- Ruwangi Rathnayake as Kavya
- Maheshi Madusanka as Dinethra
- Nethu Priyangika as Devumini
- Menaka Madhuwanthi as Subodhani
- Robin Fernando as Mr. Wijenayake
- Wilson Gunaratne as Jayasundara
- Anton Jude as Popa
- Wasantha Kumaravila as Anton
- Hemantha Eriyagama as Punchi baba
- Tyrone Michael
- Susila Kottage as Umma devi
- Vinoja Nilanthi as Sylvia
- Kapila Sigera as Police inspector
- Imalsha Madushani as Disco girl
- Sahan Wijesinghe
- Premadasa Vithanage
