= Anton Jude =

Sri Lankan actor, comedian and singer

Anton Jude ඇන්ටන් ජූඩ්
- Born: 28 November 1960; Walauwatta, Ratmalana, Sri Lanka
- Died: 19 March 2012 (aged 51); Ragama Hospital, North Colombo Sri Lanka
- Education: St. Anthony's College Mt. Lavinia
- Occupations: Film, teledrama and stage actor
- Years active: 1978–2012
- Spouse: Manel Wijesekera
- Father: Clarence Gomes

Anton Jude Gomes, known as Anton Jude (28 November 1960 – 19 March 2012; ඇන්ටන් ජූඩ්) was an actor in Sri Lankan cinema, stage drama and television. A career spanning more than three decades, Jude was a popular comedian in television and cinema. He is best known for the comedy roles in Sabanda Pabilis, Sikuru Hathe and Sakisanda Suwaris.

He died on 19 March 2012 during a film shooting in Kelaniya.

== Early life and career ==
Jude was born on 28 November 1960 at Rathmalana, the eldest in a family of four children. He was inspired by his father, Clarence Gomes, for his singing talents. He studied at St. Anthony's Roman Catholic school in Mount Lavinia.

Jude made his debut on stage with Sashi Quintes's Sudu Haththak ("White Mushroom") in 1978 and continued acting in films such as Bahubuthayo, Rankewita, Numba Nadan Apata Pissu, Sikuru Hathe, Rosa Kele, Ethumai Methumai and several other popular movies.

He acted in tele dramas Punchi Rala, Sabanda Pabilis, Sakisanda Elias, Isuru Yogaya and others. His song Ais Amma Gundu (Una Puruke Balu Walige) was also a popular hit among the masses. Jude created his first stage drama Sakisanda Madala, where the first screen was held on 29 December 2009 at the Elphinston Theatre.

== Illness and death ==
Jude had been ailing for some time with high blood pressure and diabetes. He had been treated at the Nawaloka hospital in February 2012. On the evening of 19 March 2012, Jude was rushed to the Colombo North Ragama hospital due to a cardiac arrest and at 11:20 pm he was pronounced dead on admission to the hospital. Jude died while he was working on a new film, 'Veerya, while shooting at the director Sunil Aruna Weerasiri's place in Kelaniya. Jude was survived by his wife Manel. On 22 March 2012, his remains were buried at the Borella Cemetery, Colombo.

== Filmography ==
Year	Film	Role
1997	Mother Teresa: In the Name of God's Poor	Outside church talker
2002	Bahubuthayo	The devil in the bus
2003	One Shot	Johnny
2003	Numba Nadan Apita Pissu	PC Walbanda
2005	Samanala Thatu	Sarath
2006	Nilambare	Podiyan
2007	Sikuru Hathe	Transgender
2007	No Problem Darling	
2008	Rosa Kale	Basil
2008	Walapatala	Piyasena
2009	Sir Last Chance	Detective
2009	Ali Surathal	Liyana Mahaththaya
2009	Leader	
2010	Uththara	Victor
2010	Mago Digo Dai	Sudu Mathathaya
2010	Suwanda Denuna Jeewithe	Guest appearance
2011	Ethumai Methumai	Andapala
2012	Super Six	Minister
2012	Jeevithe Lassanai	Popa
2014	Api Marenne Na	Deepal. Posthumous release
2024	Veerya	Ganesh. Posthumous release

=== Stage plays ===
- Mee purawesiyo
- Sudu Haththak
- Saranga Newen Awith

=== Television ===
- Abuddassa Kalaya
- Deva Daruwo
- E Brain
- Ekamath Eka Rataka
- Hit Wicket
- Isuru Bawana
- Isuru Yogaya
- Kande Handiya
- Kota Uda Mandira
- Mehew Rate
- Mila
- Mini Palanga
- Nadu Ahana Walawwa
- Night Learners
- Pinkanda Simona
- Punchi Rala
- Ran Samanalayo
- Sabanda Pabilis
- Sakisanda Eliyas
- Sakisanda Suwaris
- Sihina Pawura
- Situ Gedara
- Sura Pura Sara
- Swarna Veena
- Theth Saha Viyali
- Three-wheel Malli
- Vinivindimi
