= Yalu Malu Yalu 2 =

- Sinhala: යාලු මාලු යාලු 2
- Directed by: Lal Priyadeva
- Written by: Lal Priyadeva
- Produced by: Randiwa Films
- Starring: Ranjan Ramanayake; Prashani Perera; Teddy Vidyalankara
- Cinematography: Janith Gunasekara
- Edited by: Danal Thiranjana
- Music by: Sarath Wickrama
- Distributed by: CEL Theatres
- Release date: 15 November 2018
- Country: Sri Lanka
- Language: Sinhala

Yalu Malu Yalu 2 (Sinhala: යාලු මාලු යාලු 2) is a 2018 Sri Lankan Sinhalese children's film directed by Lal Priyadeva and co-produced by Nishantha Jayawardena and Malinga Srimal Weerasinghe for Randiwa Films. It is the sequel of 2016 film Mage Yalu Malu. It stars Ranjan Ramanayake, Prashani Perera in lead roles along with Teddy Vidyalankara and Nilushi Halpita. Music composed by Sarath Wickrama. It is the 1315th Sri Lankan film in the Sinhalese cinema.

== Cast ==
- Ranjan Ramanayake
- Prashani Perera
- Teddy Vidyalankara
- Nilushi Halpita
- Sunil Premakumara
- Sureni Senarath
- Malki Fernando
- Tyrone Michael
- D.B. Gangodathenna
- Sisira Kumarathunga
- Pankaja Chandev
- Sandali Senara
- Yashod Wickramarchchi
