= Sureni Senarath =

Sri Lankan actress and film producer (1959-2021)

Sureni Senarath සුරේනි සෙනරත්
- Born: 17 June 1959; Colombo, Sri Lanka
- Died: 26 May 2021 (aged 61); Maharagama, Sri Lanka
- Education: Kalutara Balika National School; Rosmead Balika Vidyalaya
- Occupations: Actress, film producer, politician, film executive
- Years active: 1975–2018
- Parents: Piyaratne Senarath (father); Iranganie Senarath (mother)
- Relatives: Navaratne Senarath (uncle)

Sureni Senarath (17 June 1959 – 26 May 2021: Sinhala: සුරේනි සේනරත්) was an actress in Sri Lankan cinema, theatre and television.

== Family background ==
She was born on 17 June 1959 in Colombo, Sri Lanka as the eldest of the family. She completed education from Kalutara Balika National School and Rosmead Balika Vidyalaya, Colombo 8. She was unmarried in her life.

Her father Piyaratne Senarath was a film actor. Her mother Iranganie was a film producer. Sureni had one sister: Gayani and two brothers: Harsha, Prabhath, all are involved in film coordination. Piyaratne was born in 1925 and later worked in the Department of Immigration and Emigration. As an actor, Piyaratne starred in the films Vædibima, Ruhuṇu Kumāri, Dehadaka Duka, Pickpockeṭ, Kēsara Sinhayō, Ada Mehemayi and Siril Mallī. He died in 2001. Piyaratne's younger brother Navaratne Senarath was a member of the Sarasaviya Awards Jury when he was the Director General of Sri Lanka Customs.

== Career ==
Sureni made her film acting debut in the 1975 film Amaraneeya Adare produced by her mother and directed by Dayananda Jayawardena. She was the producer of the 1986 film Mal Warusa where she also played a supportive role in it. She acted in more than 25 films in her career limited career. The turning point in her film career was her self-produced 1983 film Loku Thaththa directed by K. D. Dayananda. Sureni played the role of a circus performer in this film and later won the Lux Award for Best Upcoming Actress at the 1984 Sarasaviya Awards.

Some of her other notable performances as an actress came in Chandi Raja (1990), Dalulana Gini (1995), Salupata Ahasata 2 (2000), Yalu Malu Yalu 2 (2018). As a teledrama actress, she acted in the television serials: Kaḷu Kapā Eḷi, Bhumarangaya and Kindurangana. As a theatre actress, she also starred in the plays Valākuḷu, Yakaḍa Sapattu and Naralovaṭa Væḍa. During this time, she was in charge of the Kataragama Resort.

Apart from acting, she served as the Working Director of the Sri Lanka National Film Corporation. For a time she was a member of the United National Party and was also an active member of the Arts Organization.

== Death ==
She died on 26 May 2021 at the age of 61 at the Apeksha Hospital in Maharagama after suffering from severe cancer. Her remains were laid to rest at the Jayaratne Funeral Home, Borella. The final rites took place at the General Cemetery in Borella at 5.00 pm on 27 May 2021.

== Filmography ==
Year	Film	Roles	Ref.
1975	Amaraneeya Adare		
1980	Doctor Susantha		
1983	Loku Thaththa		
1984	Binaree Saha Sudu Banda		
1986	Mal Varusa	Producer, Jagath's sister	
1987	Kavuluva		
1988	Rasa Rahasak		
1989	Badulu Kochchiya		
1990	Chandi Raja		
1991	Uthura Dakuna		
1994	Nohadan Kumariye		
1994	Pavana Ralu Viya		
1994	Handana Kinkini		
1994	150 Mulleriyawa	Sujatha's relative	
1994	Vijaya Geetha	Shelterer's wife	
1995	Chitti		
1995	Hitha Honda Surayo		
1995	Dalulana Gini		
1998	Sathutai Kirula Ape		
1999	Akunu Pahara		
1999	Anduru Sevaneli		
1999	Sathya Devi	Sumanawathie	
2000	Salupata Ahasata 2		
2002	Surapurata Kanyaviyak		
2005	Samantha		
2005	Alu Yata Gini		
2006	Rana Hansi		
2015	Aathma Warusha		
2017	Dharmayuddhaya	Principal	
2018	Yalu Malu Yalu 2		

== See also ==
- List of Sri Lankan actors
