= Dharma Puthra =

- Sinhala: ධර්ම පුත්‍ර
- Directed by: Louis Vanderstraaten
- Written by: Louis Vanderstraaten
- Produced by: Bensimo CIne Art Productions
- Starring: Wasantha Kumaravila, Anusha Damayanthi; Buddhika Rambukwella
- Cinematography: Denesh Kumar
- Edited by: M. S. Aliman
- Music by: Charaka Madusanka
- Distributed by: MPI Theatres
- Release date: 4 August 2006
- Country: Sri Lanka
- Language: Sinhala

Dharma Puthra (Sinhala: ධර්ම පුත්‍ර) is a 2006 Sri Lankan comedy film directed by Louis Vanderstraaten and produced by Nimal Sumanasekara for Bensimo CIne Art Productions. It stars Wasantha Kumaravila, and Anusha Damayanthi in lead roles along with Ruddhika Rambukwella and Raja Fernando. Music composed by Charaka Madusanka.

Damayanthi won a merit award at 31st Sarasaviya Awards for the acting. After a few days of screening, the film was removed from the theaters, prompting the producer to take action against the financial losses he incurred due to the film.

== Cast ==
- Wasantha Kumaravila as Dharma
- Anusha Damayanthi as Maduri
- Buddhika Rambukwella as Vipula
- Nimal Sumanasekara
- Dayananda Jayawardena
- Raja Fernando
- Vimal Jayakody
- Janaki de Silva
- Aravinda Irugalbandara
- Hemantha Rathnakumara
