= Vishaka Siriwardana =

Sri Lankan actress (1956-2021)

- විශාඛා සිරිවර්ධන
- Born: Mukthagara Adhikari Muidayanse Ralahaminalage Vishaka Siriwardana; 28 August 1956; Kurunegala, Dominion of Ceylon
- Died: 23 October 2021 (aged 65); Kurunegala, Sri Lanka
- Education: Katupotha Tissa Maha Vidyalaya
- Occupation: Actress
- Years active: 1981–2021
- Height: 5 ft 9 in (175 cm)
- Spouse: Daya Dharmasiriwardena

Mukthagara Adhikari Muidayanse Ralahaminalage Vishaka Siriwardana (Sinhala: විශාඛා සිරිවර්ධන; 28 August 1956 – 23 October 2021), (Note: Sinhala Cinema Database cited she was born in 1957. However leading cinema source Sarasaviya recorded her birthday on 1956.) popularly known as Vishaka Siriwardana, was an actress in Sri Lankan cinema and television. In a career spanning more than three decades, she was known for her breakthrough roles in Saaranga, Sasara Chethana and Sura Duthiyo. At 5 feet 9 inches tall, she was the tallest actress in Sri Lanka.

== Personal life ==
Vishaka Siriwardana was born on 28 August 1956 in Katupotha, Kurunegala, Sri Lanka as the eighth child in a family of nine siblings. Her mother was Donna Lizzie Siriwardena and father was Desai Sarath Siriwardena. She was educated at Katupotha Tissa Maha Vidyalaya.

She was married to Daya Dharmasiriwardena. Daya was involved with a terrible road accident and as a result, he had to have one of his legs amputated.

She was being treated for a cancerous condition for long time, but continued to work in the industry. However, she died on 23 October 2021 at the age of 66, while receiving treatment at the Kurunegala Teaching Hospital. Her remains were laid to rest at the Kurunegala Municipal Council Florist Hall from 8.00 am to 5.00 pm on 24 October 2021. Funeral function was performed on 25 October 2021 at Katupotha Cemetery.

== Career ==
She entered drama by accident. One day, Vishaka heard that the film Wasanthaye Dawasak was being shot in her hometown of Katupotha, Kurunegala. She went there with a group of her friends and saw the cast of the film including queen actress Malini Fonseka. After seeing the shooting, she also wanted to be an actress. Film director Siri Kularatne's brother was a classmate of Visakha, whereby he helped Vishaka to meet Siri Kularatne. Then Kularatne selected Visakha for his latest film Anuradha and she made her film debut along with Malini Fonseka which was shot in 1981. But her first screened film is Saaranga in 1981 directed by Gamini Hewawitharana.

After the success of the film, she starred in the films, such as, Sanasanna Maa, and Yahalu Yeheli, both in 1982. In 1984, she acted in three films: Kokila, Podi Ralahami and Sasara Chethana. Later Visakha won the Sarasaviya Award for Best Emerging Actress for her performance in the film Sasara Chethana in 1985 at the 13th Sarasaviya Awards. She continued to receive invitations to films, but due to her husband's accident, she could not contribute to them. After that transition period, she returned to cinema with the film Sandamadala directed by Malani Fonseka. In 1986, she won the Best Performance Award at the 13th OCIC Award Ceremony for her role in Sura Duthiyo. Then she acted in the films such as, Puthuni Mata Samavenna, Sura Duthiyo, Asipatha Mamai, Sathyagrahanaya, Kristhu Charithaya, Cheriyo Doctor, Yasoma and Bheeshanaye Athuru Kathawak.

Apart from cinema, she made notable appearances in the television particularly through villain roles. She played the character "Rathu Akka" in the television serial Isuru Gira, where she became very popular with that character at the time. Then she was able to contribute to a number of serials and soap operas such as; Bimmal Illama, Tulā Dahara, Sarala Samanalī, Kithsirigē Iraṇama, Deveni Vēdikāva, Sāvil Pālik, Kāhala Nādaya, Sivdiya Dahara, Poda Væssa, Bamba Ketu Hati, Bhawana, and Vasuda. In 2007, she won the Sumathi Best Teledrama Supporting Actress Award for her role in the television serial Doovili Sulanga at the 12th Sumathi Awards.

== Filmography ==
Year	Film	Role	Ref.
1981	Saranga		
1982	Sanasanna Maa		
1982	Anuradha		
1982	Yahalu Yeheli	Wimalawathie	
1984	Kokila		
1984	Podi Ralahami	Lata's co-worker	
1984	Sasara Chethana		
1985	Puthuni Mata Samavenna		
1985	Suraduthiyo		
1986	Asipatha Mamai	Nirmala	
1987	Sathyagrahanaya	Chief's secretary	
1987	Randamwel		
1990	Christhu Charithaya	Martha	
1991	Cheriyo Doctor	Nurse	
1994	Sandamadala	Sujatha	
1996	Sihina Vimane Raja Kumari	Spy	
1997	Yasoma		
1997	Ninja Sri Lanka		
1999	Sathyadevi	Bath Kade lover	
1999	Nagaran	Seetha	
2001	Kolamba Koloppan		
2003	Bheeshanaye Athuru Kathawak	Allan Nona	
2007	No Problem Darling		
2009	Dancing Star		
2010	Uththara		
2011	Muthu Salamba		
2013	Ira Laga Wadi	Vishaka	
2014	Ahelepola Kumarihami	Molligoda Kumarihami	
2015	Aathma Warusha		
2015	Singa Machan Charlie		
2018	Seya	School teacher	
TBD	Sanda Dadayama		
TBD	Sanda Adare Sandatai		
TBD	Maathra		
TBD	Rocket Raja Pocket Raja		
TBD	Kalyana Mithrayo		

== See also ==
- List of Sri Lankan actors
