= Rupantharana =

- Sinhala: රූපාන්තරණ
- Directed by: Nalaka Withange
- Produced by: Arosha Fernando
- Starring: Amila Karunanayake; Shaila Nathaniel
- Cinematography: Samith Alahakoon
- Edited by: Eshan Motagedara
- Music by: Lahiru Perera
- Release date: 15 February 2014
- Country: Sri Lanka
- Language: Sinhala

Rupantharana (Sinhala: රූපාන්තරණ) is a 2014 Sri Lankan Sinhala action thriller film directed by Nalaka Withange and produced by Arosha Fernando. It stars newcomers Amila Karunanayake and Shaila Nathaniel in lead roles along with stars like Ranjan Ramanayake, Ravindra Randeniya and Tissa Wijesurendra. It is the 1201st Sri Lankan film in the Sinhala cinema.

== Cast ==
- Amila Karunanayake as Haren
- Shaila Nathaniel as Andrea
- Ravindra Randeniya as Brigadier Vimal
- Ranjan Ramanayake as Lieutenant Gajasinghe aka Moorthi
- Anjela Seneviratne as Saroja
- Tissa Wijesurendra as Gilbert
- Damitha Abeyratne as Radha
- Saranga Disasekara as Captain Suraweera
- Menik Wijewarndena in cameo appearance
- Milinda Madugalle as Warun
- Kelum Kularathne
- Nayana Kumari as Haren's boss

== Soundtrack ==
| No. | Title | Lyrics | Singer(s) | Length |
|---|---|---|---|---|
| 1. | "Paaren" | Manuranga Wijesekara | Sanuka Wickramasinghe ft. Lahiru Perera and Randhir Vithana |
