= Amaranath Jayathilake =

Sri Lankan filmmaker (1926–2006)

Amaranath Jayathilake අමරනාත් ජයතිලක
- Born: 20 May 1937; Colombo, Sri Lanka
- Died: 25 September 2013 (aged 76); Colombo, Sri Lanka
- Burial place: Kanatte Cemetery
- Occupations: Director, screenplay writer, journalist, writer
- Years active: 1961–2008

Amaranath Jayathilake (Sinhala: අමරනාත් ජයතිලක; 20 May 1937 – 25 September 2013) was a journalist, writer and filmmaker in Sri Lankan cinema.

== Personal life ==
Jayathilake was born on 20 May 1937 in Colombo, Sri Lanka.

On 4 September 2013, he was hospitalised following an accident and was treated at the Colombo National Hospital. Despite medical care, he died on 25 September 2013, at the age of 76. His body was buried the next day in Kanatte Cemetery, following his last request that his body should be buried without any decorations or ceremony.

== Career ==
Jayathilake began his film writing career with the Lankadeepa newspaper in 1961. In November of the same year, he traveled to Kolkata, India, to study film production. During his time there, he studied cinema under the guidance of Indian filmmaker Satyajit Ray.

In 1968, he made his directorial debut with the film Adarawanthayo, which marked the beginning of singer and composer Victor Rathnayake's career in background music. In 1977, Jayathilake directed Siripala saha Ranmenika, which set new revenue records in Sinhala cinema. That same year, he released another film, Nivena Ginna. In 1981, he directed Eka Dawasak Re, which received critical acclaim.

In 1984, he directed the film Arunata Pera which was invited to screen in all 14 major film festivals in India. In 1985, he won the Awards for Best Screenplay and Best Director for the film Arunata Pera at the 7th Presidential Film Festival. In the same year, he won the Best Screenplay and Best Director Awards at the 12th OCIC Award Ceremony for the same film. In 1999, he was honoured with the "Syril B Perera" Award at the 25th OCIC Award Ceremony. In addition to that, Arunata Pera is the first and only Sinhala film to be preserved in the Museum of Modern Art in New York, USA. The film won nine Presidential awards and nine SIGNIS OCIC awards.

He is considered the pioneer of Sri Lankan film literature. He wrote many books, such as 'Chithrapata Parichaya,' based on various subjects to make film a classical art in Sri Lanka. He also edited an English film magazine called "Film Frame" and started a magazine called "Chithrapata Maadya" on behalf of the Film Sub-Panel under the Arts Council of Sri Lanka and was its assistant editor as it was the first academic film magazine published in the Sinhala language. Meanwhile, he became the Sri Lanka correspondent for the English language newspaper "Cine Advance," published in India. He later became a local correspondent for the Indian monthly magazines "Film Ward" and "Cinema India International."

Jayathilake wrote articles for over 20 years for the Japanese monthly magazine "Film & TV Marketing" and for 30 years for the annual film Guide and the "International Film Guide." He was a two-time member of the Advisory Board of the National Film Corporation of Sri Lanka. He also served as a member of the Jury at Film Festivals in India, Japan, and Germany. In 2003, he directed his final feature film Bheeshanaye Athuru Kathawak. The film was also screened at the International Film Festival, Rotterdam. In the mid-2000s, he studied cinema while staying in Hollywood, USA. In 2008, he was honoured at the Film Writers' Awards Ceremony held under the patronage of veteran journalist Arthur U. Amarasena.

== Filmography ==
Year	Film	Roles	Ref.
1968	Adarawanthayo	Director	
1970	Priyanga	Director	
1976	Thilaka Ha Thilakaa	Director	
1977	Siripala Ha Ranmanika	Director	
1977	Nivena Ginna	Director	
1981	Eka Dawasak Re	Director	
1984	Adara Geethaya	Director	
1984	Arunata Pera	Director, Scriptwriter	
1994	Yuwathipathi	Director	
2004	Bheeshanaye Athuru Kathawak	Director	
