= Punsiri Soysa =

Sri Lankan singer

Punsiri Soysa පුන්සිරි සොයිසා
- Born: 5 March
- Education: Prince of Wales' College, Moratuwa
- Occupations: Singer, musician
- Spouse: Kumudika Perera
- Children: 3
- Awards: Kala Bhushana
- Musical career
- Genres: Pop; soul; rhythm and blues; Indian classical music
- Instrument: Vocals
- Years active: 1982–present
- Labels: Nilwala; Vijitha Trade Center; Ransilu; MEntertainment; Evoke

Kala Bhushana Punsiri Soysa (born 5 March as පුන්සිරි සොයිසා [Sinhala]) is a Sri Lankan singer. Since the 1970s, Punsiri, also known as "The Tear of Breakup," has recorded a number of well-known songs.

== Personal life ==
He was born on 5 March as the second of the family with one elder brother, two younger brothers and one younger sister. His father was W. Ackman Soysa and mother was . He first studied at the village Buddhist mixed school up to the third class. Then he entered the Prince of Wales' College, Moratuwa for further education. At school he sang a song in every literary society.

He is married to longtime partner Kumudika Perera. His wife lived in Egoda Uyana, Moratuwa whereas Punsiri also lived in Moratuwa for some time. Despite obstacles, we were married in 1978. They have three daughters. The eldest daughter Akna Pavani works in the Engineering Corporation. The second daughter Sathmini Buddhimala has graduated from the University of Jayewardenepura and is currently working in a private company. She passed the Visharada examination and studied music under Amarasiri Munasinghe at the Sanhinda Kalayatana in Rawathawatte as well as graduated from Bhatkhande Music University, India. The third daughter Vishodha Uvini works in the Electricity Board.

== Career ==
When he was about ten years old, he listened to the songs of Mohideen Baig and Milton Perera and began to hum them slowly. He also had the opportunity to sing at mat parties at party receptions in the village. His father encouraged Punsiri for these parties and took with him. His father went to amateur competitions, brought in applications for Punsiri, filled them out and presented them all. During school days, he entered the Gayathri Art Institute in Kesbewa and studied Ragadhari music under Vincent Somapala.

In 1967, Punsiri first participated in a Vesak devotional song competition and won first place in that competition. He also got a big trophy from that first victory. During school times, he joined the radio program Lama Pitiya managed by Karunaratne Abeysekera. Through that he participated in 'Sarala Gee' programs. In 1968, he participated in the 'Sarala Gee' Test and passed as a B grade artist in Sri Lanka Broadcasting Corporation (SLBC). Later, Punsiri again participated for a 'Sarala Gee' test and this time passed as an A grade artist. With that, his songs were recorded and broadcast in many radio programs. He first participated in the 1970s recordings and recorded three or four songs and aired them on the radio and deleted them. However, the songs of the second and third programs were broadcast on the radio and recorded. The recordings continued to be broadcast on the radio.

In 1970s, he sang his first song “Udawana Mihira Piri Hetak Ginala” wrote by Saman Chandranath Weerasinghe. In 1971, Punsiri composed the song Sewwandiyakata Pem Banda. In 1974, he sang four songs on the 'Sarala Gee' program, including most popular hits Nohan Ladune, Ganga Diyaeli Gala. The song Nohadan Landune became extremely popular among the public. The song was composed by Stanley Fernando and wrote by Chandrasena Range. With that songs, he was one of the most sought out singers in outdoor musical shows and also had the first foreign tour, which was in Bahrain. He first contracted with Siak Entertainment for outdoor musical shows. In 1977, he rendered his voice as a playback singer for the film Hariyanakota Ohoma Thamai directed by K. A. Wijeratne.

Later, he sang the song Subha Kiya Ma which was another record hit. As the songs became more popular, Punsiri received many invitations to travel abroad including Bahrain, Dubai, Kuwait, Lebanon, Jordan, Italy, France. Some of his most popular songs include, Me Bus Newathuma, Sewwandiyakata Pem Banda, Egodath Megodath, Biduwak Iwasa Ahanna. The song Egodath Megodath is about the old Galle Road bridge that was built connecting Moratuwa and Panadura.

Meanwhile, Punsiri also sang Hindi songs at the request of his friend. They composed songs for some beautiful Hindi melodies using local musical instruments which became very popular and was an economically very successful. After that, many cassette makers invited him to create such songs although he sang those songs not so fondly.

In 2019, he held a concert at the Horana Shriapali under the name 'Nohandan Ladune'.
