= Muthu Salamba =

- Sinhala: මුතු සළඹ
- Directed by: Kusumchandra Gamage
- Written by: Kusumchandra Gamage
- Produced by: Wijeratne Gamage
- Starring: Lal Weerasinghe; Anusha Damayanthi; Udith Abeyrathne
- Cinematography: Dinesh Kumara
- Edited by: M. S. Aliman
- Music by: Sarath de Alwis
- Release date: 28 April 2011
- Country: Sri Lanka
- Language: Sinhala

Muthu Salamba (Sinhala: මුතු සළඹ) is a 2011 Sri Lankan Sinhala adult drama film directed by Kusumchandra Gamage and produced by Wijeratne Gamage. It stars Lal Weerasinghe and Anusha Damayanthi in lead roles along with Udith Abeyrathne and Chanchala Warnasuriya. Music composed by Sarath de Alwis. It is the 1157th Sri Lankan film in the Sinhala cinema.

== Cast ==
- Lal Weerasinghe as Vishwa
- Anusha Damayanthi
- Dilani Madurasinghe
- Udith Abeyratne
- Vishaka Siriwardana
- Nalin Pradeep Udawela
- Jeevan Handunnetti
- Chanchala Warnasuriya
