= Susila Kottage =

Sri Lankan actress and comedian (born 1957)

Susila Kottage සුසිලා කෝට්ටගේ
- Born: Hewamunaweerage Susila Devi de Silva; January 30, 1957 (age 69); Matara, Sri Lanka
- Occupations: Actress, Comedian
- Years active: 1990–present
- Spouse: Rahal Bulathsinhala

Hewamunaweerage Susila Devi de Silva (born January 30, 1957, as සුසිලා කෝට්ටගේ) [Sinhala]), popularly known as Susila Kottage, is an actress in Sri Lankan cinema theater and television. One of Sri Lanka's best female comedians, Kottage is famous for the role Dayawathi in television serial Kopi Kade and films Angara Dagara and Sikuru Hathe.

== Personal life ==
Susila Kottage was born on 30 January 1957 in Matara. Her mother died at the delivery and her father married again when she was young. She completed her education from Sujatha Vidyalaya, Matara. She is married to Rahal Bulathsinhala, who is a retired jail police officer as well as a renowned actor. She met Rahal during stage dramas.

== Acting career ==
=== Selected television serials ===
- Bedde Senehasa
- Dangayanta Pamanai
- Doo Kumariyo
- Eth Kanda Lihini
- Gajamuthu
- Hapanaa
- Hatara Kenderaya
- Hatara Wate
- Hiruta Pipena Sooriyakantha
- Iskole
- Ithin Eeta Passe
- Kasee Salu
- Kombi
- Kopi Kade as Dayawathi
- Kula Kumariya
- Mehew Rate
- Miringu Sayura
- Prarthana Mal
- Ran Poruwa
- Sabawen Awasarai
- Sakala Guru
- Sakala Guru 2
- Sanda Hiru Tharu
- Sathyangana
- Sathyaya
- Sil
- Situ Gedara
- Sulang Kapolla
- Waramal
- Vinoda Samayan
- Visi Eka
- Yalui Api Yalui

=== Selected stage dramas ===
- Sargentge Nandamma
- Ilndari

== Illness ==
In 2017, she was admitted in the hospital with a heart attack. She underwent treatments for 4 days at the ward 61 in General Hospital, Colombo.

== Controversy ==
In 2010, Kottage has been produced before the Kaduwela District Court on a charge of defamation of Rs. 300,000 from the teledrama director Leela Wickramarachchi. The Additional Magistrate and Additional District Judge Sujatha Alahapperuma, ordered her to appear before the court on September 23, 2010. The incident took place where Kottage has joined as an actress in the teledrama directed by Wickramarachchi Ithin Mata Awasarai.

== Filmography ==
Her maiden cinematic experience came through the 1990 film Saharawe Sihinaya, with a minor role. She has acted in more than 45 films mostly in comedy roles. Some of her popular films are Sikuru Hathe, Angara Dangara and 64 Mayam.

Key
†	Denotes films that have not yet been released

Year	Film	Role	Ref.
1990	Palama Yata	Annie	
1995	Awaragira	Asilin, Vinitha's servant	
1995	Cheriyo Captain	Alphosus' Guerilla girl	
1999	Theertha Yathra	Mother	
2001	Pissu Puso	Komala Rani	
2001	Kinihiriya Mal	Factory overseer	
2002	Seethala Gini Kandu		
2002	Cheriyo Holman		
2004	Left Right Sir	Maduwanthi	
2004	Ohoma Harida	Namali's Mother	
2005	James Bond		
2007	Weda Beri Tarzan	Nimbula	
2007	Jundai Gundai		
2007	Sikuru Hathe	Mangala Jaya's wife	
2008	Wada Bari Tarzan Mathisabayata	Susila	
2009	Kanyavi	Mrs. Charlot Sylvester	
2010	Jaya Pita Jaya	Vijay's granny	
2011	Angara Dangara	Miss Jenny	
2011	Ethumai Methumai		
2010	Thank You Berty	Berty's mother	
2012	Sakvithi Dadayama		
2012	Jeevithe Lassanai	Umma Devi	
2015	Gindari	Bunty's mother	
2016	Ran Dedunnak	Woman at gym	
2016	64 Mayam	Samanmalee	
2017	Ran Sayura	Katherina	
2018	Tawume Iskole	Punchi amma	
TBD	Eka Gei Sokari		
TBD	Edath Dinum Adath Dinum		
TBA	Elada Braa †		
