= Sundarai Adare =

Sundarai Adare සුන්දරයි ආදරේ
- DVD poster
- Directed by: Upali Piyaratne
- Written by: Sunil Yogandra
- Based on: Neil Warnakulasuriya
- Produced by: Orient Films
- Starring: Lal Weerasinghe; Dilhani Ekanayake; Robin Fernando
- Cinematography: J. J. Yogaraja; Bandula Cooray
- Edited by: Bernard Reginald
- Music by: Neil Warnakulasuriya
- Production company: Dil Foses Lab
- Release date: 31 January 2003
- Country: Sri Lanka
- Language: Sinhala

Sundarai Adare (Sinhala: සුන්දරයි ආදරේ) is a 2003 Sri Lankan Sinhala comedy action film directed by Upali Piyaratne and produced by S. Kanathapille for Orient Films. It stars Lal Weerasinghe, Dilhani Ekanayake in lead roles along with Robin Fernando, Cletus Mendis and Bandu Samarasinghe. Music composed by Neil Warnakulasuriya and co-worked with Sarath de Alwis. It is the 1000th Sri Lankan film in the Sinhala cinema.

== Cast ==
- Lal Weerasinghe as Shane Weerasinghe
- Dilhani Ekanayake as Meena
- Robin Fernando as CID Inspector Gihan Disera
- Cletus Mendis as Senaka Weerasekera
- Bandu Samarasinghe as Shane's towel boy
- Thilak Kumara Rathnayake as Lionel Dissanayake
- Ruwanthi Mangala as Mangala

=== Cameo appearances ===
- Nadeeka Gunasekara as Madhura 'Madhu' Weearsinghe
- Shashi Wijendra as Nuwan
- Ranjan Ramanayake as Murderer

== Soundtrack ==
| No. | Title | Length |
|---|---|---|
| 1. | "Gayanna Awe Nangi Malli" |
| 2. | "Mal Wage Lassana Geethe" |
| 3. | "Kandu Theere Nil Theeredi" |
| 4. | "Hamuweela Mandahase" |
