= Aladinge Waldin =

2003 film

Aladinge Waldin ඇලඩින්ගේ වෑල්ඩින්
- Directed by: Upali Piyaratne
- Written by: Tennyson Cooray
- Produced by: Indu Films
- Starring: Tennyson Cooray; Sasanthi Jayasekara; Cletus Mendis
- Cinematography: Marshall Stanley
- Edited by: Denzil Jayaweera
- Music by: Sarath de Alwis
- Production company: Dil Proses Lab
- Distributed by: CEL Theatres
- Release date: 13 March 2003
- Country: Sri Lanka
- Language: Sinhala

Aladinge Waldin (Sinhala: ඇලඩින්ගේ වෑල්ඩින්) is a 2003 Sri Lankan Sinhala comedy film directed by Upali Piyaratne and produced by Anura de Silva & Thilak Mapatuna for Indu Films. It stars Tennyson Cooray and Sasanthi Jayasekara in lead roles along with Cletus Mendis and Sunil Hettiarachchi. Music composed by Sarath de Alwis. It is the 1004th Sri Lankan film in the Sinhala cinema.

== Cast ==
- Tennyson Cooray as Aladdin 'Dean Martin'
- Sasanthi Jayasekara as Kasturi
- Cletus Mendis as Mr. Dekatana 'Julie'
- Sunil Hettiarachchi as Gulliver
- Mark Samson as Prison mentor
- Buddhika Rambukwella as Police Inspector
- Rebeka Nirmali as Kasturi's aunt
- Saman Almeida as Minister Samayawardana
- Richard Manamudali as 'Femme' Kajan
- Saliya Sathyajith as Salama
