= Katana Polling Division =

Katana
- Polling Division
- Coordinates: 7.187372°N 79.885450°E
- Country: Sri Lanka
- Province: Western Province, Sri Lanka
- Electoral District: Gampaha Electoral District

Area
  - Total: 111.44 km^{2} (43.03 sq mi)

Population (2012)
  - Total: 235,291
  - Density: 2,111/km^{2} (5,470/sq mi)
- ISO 3166 code: EC-02C

The Katana Polling Division is a Polling Division in the Gampaha Electoral District, in the Western Province, Sri Lanka.

== Presidential Election Results ==
=== Summary ===
The winner of Katana has matched the final country result 8 out of 8 times.

Year	Katana	Gampaha Electoral District	MAE %	Sri Lanka	MAE %
2019	SLPP	SLPP	0.94%	SLPP	6.05%
2015	NDF	NDF	1.64%	NDF	0.23%
2010	UPFA	UPFA	1.61%	UPFA	1.75%
2005	UPFA	UPFA	0.51%	UPFA	3.79%
1999	PA	PA	2.52%	PA	7.40%
1994	PA	PA	1.96%	PA	0.41%
1988	UNP	SLFP	3.30%	UNP	0.54%
1982	UNP	UNP	0.28%	UNP	2.12%
Matches/Mean MAE	8/8	7/8	1.60%	8/8	2.78%

=== 2019 Sri Lankan Presidential Election ===
Party	Katana		Gampaha Electoral District		Sri Lanka	
Party	Votes	%	Votes	%	Votes	%
SLPP	71,565	58.10%	855,870	59.28%	6,924,255	52.25%
NDF	43,053	34.95%	494,671	34.26%	5,564,239	41.99%
NMPP	5,343	4.34%	61,760	4.28%	418,553	3.16%
Other Parties (with < 1%)	1,844	1.50%	20,227	1.40%	295,797	2.23%
NPP	1,375	1.12%	11,272	0.78%	49,655	0.37%
Valid Votes	123,180	98.57%	1,443,800	98.92%	13,252,499	98.99%
Rejected Votes	1,786	1.43%	15,751	1.08%	135,452	1.01%
Total Polled	124,966	81.44%	1,459,551	83.31%	13,387,951	83.71%
Registered Electors	153,448		1,751,892		15,992,568	

=== 2015 Sri Lankan Presidential Election ===
Party	Katana		Gampaha Electoral District		Sri Lanka	
Party	Votes	%	Votes	%	Votes	%
NDF	58,507	51.49%	669,007	49.83%	6,217,162	51.28%
UPFA	54,355	47.83%	664,347	49.49%	5,768,090	47.58%
Other Parties (with < 1%)	773	0.68%	9,142	0.68%	138,200	1.14%
Valid Votes	113,635	98.69%	1,342,496	98.92%	12,123,452	98.85%
Rejected Votes	1,505	1.31%	14,647	1.08%	140,925	1.15%
Total Polled	115,140	80.02%	1,357,143	80.77%	12,264,377	78.69%
Registered Electors	143,885		1,680,263		15,585,942	

=== 2010 Sri Lankan Presidential Election ===
Party	Katana		Gampaha Electoral District		Sri Lanka	
Party	Votes	%	Votes	%	Votes	%
UPFA	59,558	60.04%	718,716	61.66%	6,015,934	57.88%
NDF	38,605	38.92%	434,506	37.28%	4,173,185	40.15%
Other Parties (with < 1%)	1,034	1.04%	12,426	1.07%	204,494	1.97%
Valid Votes	99,197	99.23%	1,165,648	99.24%	10,393,613	99.03%
Rejected Votes	767	0.77%	8,960	0.76%	101,838	0.97%
Total Polled	99,964	78.45%	1,174,608	78.03%	10,495,451	66.70%
Registered Electors	127,421		1,505,363		15,734,587	

=== 2005 Sri Lankan Presidential Election ===
Party	Katana		Gampaha Electoral District		Sri Lanka	
Party	Votes	%	Votes	%	Votes	%
UPFA	49,095	54.23%	596,698	54.78%	4,887,152	50.29%
UNP	40,473	44.71%	481,764	44.23%	4,706,366	48.43%
Other Parties (with < 1%)	960	1.06%	10,815	0.99%	123,521	1.27%
Valid Votes	90,528	98.93%	1,089,277	98.94%	9,717,039	98.88%
Rejected Votes	977	1.07%	11,724	1.06%	109,869	1.12%
Total Polled	91,505	79.85%	1,101,001	79.17%	9,826,908	69.51%
Registered Electors	114,595		1,390,691		14,136,979	

=== 1999 Sri Lankan Presidential Election ===
Party	Katana		Gampaha Electoral District		Sri Lanka	
Party	Votes	%	Votes	%	Votes	%
PA	45,607	59.82%	532,796	56.58%	4,312,157	51.12%
UNP	27,389	35.93%	353,969	37.59%	3,602,748	42.71%
JVP	2,224	2.92%	40,472	4.30%	343,927	4.08%
Other Parties (with < 1%)	1,015	1.33%	14,382	1.53%	176,679	2.09%
Valid Votes	76,235	98.01%	941,619	97.84%	8,435,754	97.69%
Rejected Votes	1,545	1.99%	20,768	2.16%	199,536	2.31%
Total Polled	77,780	77.51%	962,387	77.12%	8,635,290	72.17%
Registered Electors	100,352		1,247,860		11,965,536	

=== 1994 Sri Lankan Presidential Election ===
Party	Katana		Gampaha Electoral District		Sri Lanka	
Party	Votes	%	Votes	%	Votes	%
PA	42,916	62.83%	550,654	64.74%	4,709,205	62.28%
UNP	24,637	36.07%	288,608	33.93%	2,715,283	35.91%
Other Parties (with < 1%)	750	1.10%	11,256	1.32%	137,040	1.81%
Valid Votes	68,303	98.75%	850,518	98.48%	7,561,526	98.03%
Rejected Votes	864	1.25%	13,137	1.52%	151,706	1.97%
Total Polled	69,167	75.16%	863,655	74.16%	7,713,232	69.12%
Registered Electors	92,027		1,164,625		11,158,880	

=== 1988 Sri Lankan Presidential Election ===
Party	Katana		Gampaha Electoral District		Sri Lanka	
Party	Votes	%	Votes	%	Votes	%
UNP	28,760	51.20%	350,092	48.08%	2,569,199	50.43%
SLFP	25,379	45.18%	355,553	48.83%	2,289,857	44.95%
SLMP	2,036	3.62%	22,467	3.09%	235,701	4.63%
Valid Votes	56,175	98.56%	728,112	98.63%	5,094,754	98.24%
Rejected Votes	822	1.44%	10,108	1.37%	91,499	1.76%
Total Polled	56,997	74.55%	738,220	74.93%	5,186,256	55.87%
Registered Electors	76,452		985,206		9,283,143	

=== 1982 Sri Lankan Presidential Election ===
Party	Katana		Gampaha Electoral District		Sri Lanka	
Party	Votes	%	Votes	%	Votes	%
UNP	26,504	52.63%	365,847	52.50%	3,450,815	52.93%
SLFP	22,027	43.74%	301,808	43.31%	2,546,348	39.05%
JVP	1,356	2.69%	23,701	3.40%	273,428	4.19%
Other Parties (with < 1%)	474	0.94%	5,491	0.79%	249,460	3.83%
Valid Votes	50,361	99.14%	696,847	99.15%	6,520,156	98.78%
Rejected Votes	437	0.86%	5,992	0.85%	80,470	1.22%
Total Polled	50,798	83.88%	702,839	82.70%	6,600,626	80.15%
Registered Electors	60,560		849,896		8,235,358	

== Parliamentary Election Results ==
=== Summary ===
The winner of Katana has matched the final country result 6 out of 7 times leading some observers view it as a strong Bellwether for Parliamentary Elections.

Year	Katana	Gampaha Electoral District	MAE %	Sri Lanka	MAE %
2015	UNP	UNP	1.19%	UNP	2.21%
2010	UPFA	UPFA	0.25%	UPFA	1.90%
2004	UPFA	UPFA	1.09%	UPFA	3.37%
2001	PA	UNP	2.97%	UNP	5.42%
2000	PA	PA	2.99%	PA	4.65%
1994	PA	PA	0.39%	PA	5.13%
1989	UNP	UNP	0.64%	UNP	4.30%
Matches/Mean MAE	6/7	7/7	1.36%	7/7	3.85%

=== 2020 Sri Lankan Parliamentary Election ===
Party	Katana		Gampaha Electoral District		Sri Lanka	
Party	Votes	%	Votes	%	Votes	%
SLPFA	70,062	66.61%	807,896	65.76%	6,853,693	59.09%
SJB	25,055	23.82%	285,809	23.27%	2,771,984	23.9%
JJB	5,041	4.79%	61,833	5.03%	445,958	3.84%
UNP	1,775	1.69%	28,282	2.3%	249,435	2.15%
OPPP	1,510	1.44%	21,627	1.76%	67,766	0.58%
Other Parties (with < 1%)	1,743	1.65%	23,027	1.88%	1,160,093	10.44%
Valid Votes	105,186	67.3%	1,228,474	68.78%	11,598,936	71.32%
Rejected Votes	7,234	4,63%	75,509	4.23%	744,373	4.58%
Total Polled	112,420	71.93%	1,303,983	73.01%	12,343,309	75.89%
Registered Electors	156,287		1,785,964		16,263,885	

=== 2015 Sri Lankan Parliamentary Election ===
Party	Katana		Gampaha Electoral District		Sri Lanka	
Party	Votes	%	Votes	%	Votes	%
UNP	50,393	48.85%	577,004	47.17%	5,098,916	45.77%
UPFA	45,582	44.18%	549,958	44.96%	4,732,664	42.48%
JVP	6,662	6.46%	87,880	7.18%	544,154	4.88%
Other Parties (with < 1%)	530	0.51%	8,332	0.68%	81,501	0.73%
Valid Votes	103,167	94.82%	1,223,174	95.51%	11,140,333	95.35%
Rejected Votes	5,522	5.08%	56,246	4.39%	516,926	4.42%
Total Polled	108,802	75.62%	1,280,647	78.21%	11,684,111	77.66%
Registered Electors	143,885		1,637,537		15,044,490	

=== 2010 Sri Lankan Parliamentary Election ===
Party	Katana		Gampaha Electoral District		Sri Lanka	
Party	Votes	%	Votes	%	Votes	%
UPFA	49,766	63.33%	589,476	63.40%	4,846,388	60.38%
UNP	22,919	29.17%	266,523	28.67%	2,357,057	29.37%
DNA	5,228	6.65%	69,747	7.50%	441,251	5.50%
Other Parties (with < 1%)	667	0.85%	3,985	0.43%	19,003	0.24%
Valid Votes	78,580	93.97%	929,731	94.83%	8,026,322	96.03%
Rejected Votes	5,021	6.00%	50,234	5.12%	581,465	6.96%
Total Polled	83,621	65.63%	980,467	65.06%	8,358,246	59.29%
Registered Electors	127,421		1,506,969		14,097,690	

=== 2004 Sri Lankan Parliamentary Election ===
Party	Katana		Gampaha Electoral District		Sri Lanka	
Party	Votes	%	Votes	%	Votes	%
UPFA	41,823	51.53%	509,963	51.52%	4,223,126	45.70%
UNP	31,919	39.33%	367,572	37.14%	3,486,792	37.73%
JHU	6,254	7.71%	102,516	10.36%	552,723	5.98%
Other Parties (with < 1%)	1,171	1.44%	9,691	0.98%	57,229	0.62%
Valid Votes	81,167	96.11%	989,742	95.96%	9,241,931	94.52%
Rejected Votes	3,268	3.87%	41,462	4.02%	534,452	5.47%
Total Polled	84,453	76.29%	1,031,464	77.72%	9,777,821	75.74%
Registered Electors	110,706		1,327,145		12,909,631	

=== 2001 Sri Lankan Parliamentary Election ===
Party	Katana		Gampaha Electoral District		Sri Lanka	
Party	Votes	%	Votes	%	Votes	%
PA	39,498	47.54%	428,780	43.08%	3,330,815	37.19%
UNP	35,075	42.21%	437,289	43.94%	4,086,026	45.62%
JVP	7,388	8.89%	113,990	11.45%	815,353	9.10%
Other Parties (with < 1%)	1,128	1.36%	15,171	1.52%	137,826	1.54%
Valid Votes	83,089	96.34%	995,230	96.30%	8,955,844	94.77%
Rejected Votes	3,158	3.66%	38,187	3.70%	494,009	5.23%
Total Polled	86,247	80.98%	1,033,417	80.36%	9,449,878	76.03%
Registered Electors	106,508		1,285,973		12,428,762	

=== 2000 Sri Lankan Parliamentary Election ===
Party	Katana		Gampaha Electoral District		Sri Lanka	
Party	Votes	%	Votes	%	Votes	%
PA	42,316	53.66%	470,018	48.87%	3,899,329	45.33%
UNP	30,157	38.24%	378,328	39.34%	3,451,765	40.12%
JVP	3,906	4.95%	73,110	7.60%	518,725	6.03%
SU	1,578	2.00%	20,297	2.11%	127,859	1.49%
Other Parties (with < 1%)	899	1.14%	19,956	2.08%	319,123	3.71%
Valid Votes	78,856	N/A	961,709	N/A	8,602,617	N/A

=== 1994 Sri Lankan Parliamentary Election ===
Party	Katana		Gampaha Electoral District		Sri Lanka	
Party	Votes	%	Votes	%	Votes	%
PA	40,684	57.35%	509,030	56.79%	3,887,805	48.94%
UNP	29,617	41.75%	375,631	41.91%	3,498,370	44.04%
Other Parties (with < 1%)	633	0.89%	11,627	1.30%	90,078	1.13%
Valid Votes	70,934	95.89%	896,288	96.39%	7,943,688	95.20%
Rejected Votes	3,044	4.11%	33,553	3.61%	400,395	4.80%
Total Polled	73,978	80.39%	929,841	79.65%	8,344,095	74.75%
Registered Electors	92,027		1,167,469		11,163,064	

=== 1989 Sri Lankan Parliamentary Election ===
Party	Katana		Gampaha Electoral District		Sri Lanka	
Party	Votes	%	Votes	%	Votes	%
UNP	28,660	53.11%	385,733	54.14%	2,838,005	50.71%
SLFP	22,318	41.35%	294,490	41.34%	1,785,369	31.90%
USA	2,656	4.92%	21,665	3.04%	141,983	2.54%
Other Parties (with < 1%)	333	0.62%	10,549	1.48%	67,723	1.21%
Valid Votes	53,967	95.65%	712,437	95.64%	5,596,468	93.87%
Rejected Votes	2,457	4.35%	32,497	4.36%	365,563	6.13%
Total Polled	56,424	75.10%	744,934	76.82%	5,962,031	63.60%
Registered Electors	75,135		969,658		9,374,164	

== Demographics ==
=== Ethnicity ===
The Katana Polling Division has a Sinhalese majority (91.6%) . In comparison, the Gampaha Electoral District (which contains the Katana Polling Division) has a Sinhalese majority (90.5%)

Ethnicity in Katana
1. Sinhalese (91.6%)
2. Sri Lankan Tamil (4.20%)
3. Moor (1.50%)
4. Chetty (1.40%)
5. Other (1.30%)

=== Religion ===
The Katana Polling Division has a Buddhist majority (60.1%) and a significant Roman Catholic population (32.0%). In comparison, the Gampaha Electoral District (which contains the Katana Polling Division) has a Buddhist majority (71.3%) and a significant Roman Catholic population (19.5%)

Religion in Katana
1. Buddhist (60.1%)
2. Roman Catholic (32.0%)
3. Other Christian (4.10%)
4. Muslim (2.00%)
5. Hindu (1.70%)
6. Other (0.10%)
