= Saman Almeida =

Sri Lankan actor and comedian (1965–2026)

- සමන් අල්මේදා
- Born: 18 October 1965; Ceylon
- Died: 26 June 2026 (aged 60); Maharagama, Sri Lanka
- Occupations: Actor, comedian
- Years active: 2000s–2026

Saman Almeida (Sinhala: සමන් අල්මේදා 18 October 1965 – 26 June 2026) was a Sri Lankan actor and comedian. He was best known for his comedic roles in television teledramas and cinema. He rose to prominence for his portrayal of the character 'Pinto' in the Sirasa TV sitcomYes Boss.

== Life and career ==
Almeida was born on 18 October 1965 in Sri Lanka, then known as Ceylon. He began his acting career with the television serial Thahanchi. Over a career spanning more than two decades, he appeared in numerous television programmes including Bakery Gedara, Yes Boss, Swayanjatha, Pabilis, Daam, Kuwera Wara, Isuru Bhawana, Thuwankande Saradiel and Pethi Ahulana Mala.

In addition to television, Almeida also contributed to the Sri Lankan cinema, performing comedic and supporting roles in films such as Kauda Bole Alice (2000), Aladinge Waldin (2003), Sihinaya Dige Enna (2012), Gindari: Bahubuthayo 2 (2015), Patibhana (2016), and Passport (2024).

On 11 March 2026, it was reported that Almeida had been admitted to the Sri Jayawardenepura General Hospital in Colombo. He died on 26 June, at the age of 60.

=== Selected television series ===
- Daam
- Isuru Bhawana
- Kuwera Wara
- Pethi Ahulana Mala
- Punchi Walawwa
- Sabanda Pabilis
- Sakisanda Suwaris
- Sathara Waram
- Swayanjatha
- Uthuwan Kande Saradiyel
- Yes Boss
