= Robin Fernando =

Sri Lankan actor (1937–2022)

Robin Fernando රොබින් ප්‍රනාන්දු
- Born: Pattiyage Robin Steven Fernando; 15 June 1937; Kotahena, British Ceylon
- Died: 8 January 2022 (aged 84)
- Education: St. Benedict's College, Colombo
- Occupations: Actor, Stuntman
- Years active: 1964–2022
- Spouse: Violet Jayaweera (m. 1963)
- Children: 1
- Awards: Best Villain; Best Supporting Actor

Pattiyage Robin Steven Fernando (born 15 June 1937 – died 8 January 2022 as රොබින් ප්‍රනාන්දු in [Sinhala]), popularly known as Robin Fernando, was an actor in Sri Lankan cinema and television as well as a stunt coordinator. Considered as one of the best stunt directors in Sinhala cinema, Fernando started his career in the 1965 film Chandiya, and rose to prominence with lead roles.

== Early life and education ==
Fernando was born on 15 June 1937 at Kotahena, Sri Lanka as the third of the family. His father Cyril Anthony served in Department of Printing and as Chief Foreman in the Printing Division of the M.D. Gunasena Company. His mother Vilet Anthony was a housewife. He had two elder sisters and two younger sisters. A Buddhist devotee, Fernando never gave up going to the Dhamma School at Deepaduttaramaya in Kotahena on every Sundays.

He completed his education from St. Benedict's College, Colombo during the period that World War II occurred. He took national colors for sports such as karate and gymnastics as well. After leaving school in 1963, he went to work for the Mackwood Company in Colombo.

== Career ==
Fernando was introduced to film director Titus Thotawatte by Ariyaratne Kahawita. His first role came through Hingana Kolla, as an uncredited stuntman. He was chosen to film Chandiya by Ariyaratne Kahavita. According to Fernando, his first cinema acting came through Chandiya, but it was screened in 1965 after his second film Dheewarayo was screened in 1964. He has acted in more than 80 Sinhala films since his debut acting in 1965 film Chandiya. Until the film Sagarika, Fernando starred in Thotawatte's films. Although he entered as a martial artist, he was not centered in it. His most adventurous fight scene after Chandiya was in the films Kapatikama and Kauda Hari.

Fernando pointed out that stunt is an art when every time he gets a chance at the films like Bicycle Horā, Ohoma Hondada and Pēnava Nēda. The 1971 film Dævena Pipāsa made his first lead role. By that time he had shown his talent through the sub-main characters such as the role "Raja" in another 1971 film Hāralakṣe with one of his most satirical characters. Films such as Nivena Ginna, Apēkṣā, Veera Puran Appu were among Robin's most acclaimed films. The song "Soduru Lowata Mal Wehala" which he sang with Geetha Kumarasinghe in the 1978 film Apeksha is one of the most popular songs in Sinhala cinema. In that film, the terrible fight with Ranjan Mendis was also one of the most adventurous fights in Sinhala cinema. In 1983, Fernando directed his first film Sura Doothiyo, which was based on real incidents. His last direction came through Ninja Sri Lanka.

His first television acting came through Sriyani Amarasena's Ira Batu Tharuwa, which was shot in England. Some of the other television serials of Robin Fernando include, Chandramaya, Hangimuttam, Paradeesaya and Damini.

== Personal life and death ==
Fernando married his partner Violet Jayaweera on 14 October 1964 and they had one son: Channa and one daughter Eranthika. He met Violet in 1962. Fernando died on 8 January 2022, at the age of 84. He had been receiving treatment for Parkinson's disease for nearly two years.

== Filmography ==
- No. denotes the Number of Sri Lankan film in the Sri Lankan cinema.

| Year | No. | Film | Role |
|---|---|---|---|
| 1964 | 106 | Dheewarayo | First screened film |
| 1965 | 120 | Chandiya | Debut acting |
| 1966 | 136 | Sagawena Sewanella | |
| 1966 | 148 | Kapatikama | Sisira assaulter |
| 1967 | 157 | Hathara Kendare | |
| 1968 | 180 | Pini Bindu | |
| 1968 | 188 | Bicycle Hora | also as stunt coordinator |
| 1968 | 192 | Indunila | |
| 1968 | 193 | Ruhunu Kumari | also as stunt coordinator |
| 1969 | 204 | Kauda Hari | Bandu |
| 1969 | 206 | Hathara Peraliya | |
| 1970 | 228 | Penawaneda | |
| 1970 | 232 | Ohoma Hondada | |
| 1971 | 237 | Davena Pipisa | |
| 1971 | 239 | Ran Onchilla | Prasad. also as stunt coordinator |
| 1971 | 242 | Abhirahasa | Opening defensive bargoer |
| 1971 | 245 | Bindunu Hadawath | |
| 1971 | 247 | Samanala Kumariyo Samaga Api Kawadath Surayo | |
| 1971 | 248 | Haara Lakshay | Rajapakse |
| 1972 | 259 | Hithaka Pipunu Mal | Roland |
| 1972 | 256 | Singapuru Charlie | |
| 1972 | 262 | Lokuma Hinawa | Manik snatcher |
| 1972 | 265 | Ihatha Athmaya | Boss |
| 1973 | 270 | Aparadaya Ha Daduwama | |
| 1974 | 288 | Hadawath Naththo | Port worker. also as stunt coordinator |
| 1974 | 295 | Sagarika | |
| 1974 | 290 | Sihasuna | |
| 1974 | 302 | Jeewana Ganga | |
| 1974 | - | Wer stirbt schon gerne unter Palmen | German film |
| 1974 | 300 | Wasthuwa | |
| 1975 | 325 | Sikuruliya | Siridasa. also as stunt coordinator |
| 1976 | 345 | Loka Horu | |
| 1976 | 347 | Asha | also as stunt coordinator |
| 1977 | 376 | Siripala Saha Ranmenika | Lionel |
| 1977 | 380 | Nivena Ginna | also as stunt coordinator |
| 1977 | 373 | Sajaa | |
| 1978 | 399 | Veera Puran Appu | Haguranketha Dingirala |
| 1978 | 407 | Apeksha | Pradeep. also as stunt coordinator |
| 1980 | 450 | Raktha | Danthu. also as stunt coordinator |
| 1980 | 459 | Sankapali | Kapila. also as stunt coordinator |
| 1980 | 465 | Sinhabahu | also as stunt coordinator |
| 1980 | 467 | Hodin Inna | also as stunt coordinator |
| 1981 | 478 | Bamba Ketu Hati | Sugath's brother |
| 1980 | 451 | Sasaraka Pethum | Rohan |
| 1980 | 457 | Muwan Palessa 2 | Ran Banda |
| 1980 | 469 | Kinduru Kumari | Sena |
| 1981 | 483 | Eka Dawasak Ra | Chandran |
| 1981 | 494 | Anjana | |
| 1982 | 505 | Sanda | Silva baas |
| 1982 | 508 | Bambara Geethaya | Silva |
| 1982 | 521 | Jeewithayen Jeewithayak | |
| 1982 | 522 | Rahasak Nathi Rahasak | |
| 1983 | 547 | Sumithuro | Guney. also as stunt coordinator |
| 1983 | 554 | Chuttey | Wickramarachchige Piyadasa "Chuttey". also as stunt coordinator |
| 1983 | 556 | Karate Joe | Karate Joe |
| 1983 | 560 | Hasthi Wiyaruwa | Rahula Gajasinghe. also as stunt coordinator |
| 1983 | 563 | Loku Thaththa | |
| 1983 | 572 | Rathu Makara | Rahula. also as stunt coordinator |
| 1983 | 574 | Muhudu Lihini | |
| 1983 | 575 | Bonikka | Machan |
| 1984 | 586 | Weera Madduma Bandara | |
| 1984 | 595 | Rana Derana | |
| 1983 | 599 | Sahodariyakage Kathawa | |
| 1985 | 613 | Mawubima Naththam Maranaya | also as stunt coordinator |
| 1985 | 619 | Puthuni Mata Samawenna | also as stunt coordinator |
| 1985 | 631 | Sura Doothiyo | also as stunt coordinator |
| 1986 | 636 | Mal Warusa | Petrol |
| 1989 | 686 | Badulu Kochchiya | |
| 1990 | 698 | Thanha Asha | |
| 1991 | 735 | Alibaba Saha Hory Hathaliha | |
| 1992 | 751 | Ahimi Dadaman | Theja. also as stunt coordinator |
| 1993 | 782 | Saptha Kanya | Police Inspector |
| 1994 | 793 | Landuni Oba Devaganaki | |
| 1995 | 822 | Vijay Saha Ajay | Somasiri "Some" |
| 1996 | 845 | Api Baya Naha | Inspector Robin |
| 1997 | 887 | Visidela | Loku IC Mahathaya. also as stunt coordinator |
| 1998 | 900 | Girl Friend | |
| 1999 | 919 | Kolompoor | Detective |
| 2000 | 935 | Dadabima | |
| 2002 | | Pem Kekula | Indrasena |
| 2002 | 991 | Love 2002 | |
| 2003 | 1000 | Sundarai Adare | CID Inspector Gihan Disera |
| 2004 | 1029 | Sumedha | also as stunt coordinator |
| 2004 | 1043 | Underworld | |
| 2006 | 1073 | Anjalika | |
| 2009 | 1119 | Leader | |
| 2009 | 1127 | Juliya | George Lewke Bandara |
| 2009 | 1130 | Thushara remake | Thushara's father |
| 2011 | 1153 | Nidi Yahana Kelabei | |
| 2011 | 1161 | Suseema | Suseema's father |
| 2012 | 1183 | Jeevithe Lassanai | Mr. Wijenayake |
| 2015 | 1226 | Sinahawa Atharin | cameo appearance |
| 2015 | 1233 | Maharaja Ajasath | Purohitha |
| 2018 | 1294 | Adarei Man | Pavan's father |
| 2022 | | CineMa | Ananda Gunaratne |

== Television ==
Fernando has also acted in many television serials.

- Bogala Sawundiris
- Bopath Sakkiya
- Chandramaya
- Damini
- Hangimuththan
- Hima Rathriya
- Ira Batu Tharuwa
- Paradeesaya
- Pingala Danawwa
- Pushparaga
- Samudra Chaya
- Sangramaya
- Sarisara Lihini
- Sekku Gedara
- Urumaya Soya
- Wansakkarayo
- Wassanaye Hiru Evidin
