= Sumathi Awards =

Sri Lankan television awards

- Current: 31st Sumathi Awards
- Trophy of the award
- Awarded for: Excellence in television program achievements
- Country: Sri Lanka
- Presented by: Sumathi Group of Company
- First award: 1995
- Final award: 2026
- Website: sumathiawards.lk

The Sumathi Awards (Sinhala: සුමති සම්මාන) are awards bestowed to distinguished individuals involved with the Sri Lankan television industry. The Sumathi Award ceremonies are held each year by the Sumathi Group of Company in recognition of the contributions made to the Sri Lankan teledrama industry and television programs. The Sumathi ceremony is one of the most popular television program events in Sri Lanka. The awards were first introduced in 1995.

== History ==
The Sumathi film awards ceremony began in 1995 with the leadership of Mrs. Milina Sumathipala. Sumathi Group of Companies came forward and organized television festivals, acknowledging its significance and outstanding attainments to improve the quality of television programs to every age limit of the people and to acknowledge the behind the screen technicians to bring forward and value their efforts to Sri Lankan television.

The award ceremony has been witnessed 26 times consecutively, with three interruptions in 2005,2020 and 2022 where the Award ceremony did not celebrated.

== Awards given ==
In 1995, there were 32 awards in total, categorized into 4 sections - best awards, popular awards, commercial awards and merit awards. In 1996 at the second Sumathi Awards ceremony, U.A Sumathipala Award was introduced. Since 2000, awards were given under those above five categories. In 2000 Sumathi Awards, Jury Award category was included. With that six categories were awarded until 2011. In 2011 Sumathi Awards, News and other broadcasting category was introduced. In 2014 Sumathi Awards, the child award category was introduced. Since then, 50-55 Sumathi Awards have been awarded under 8 categories.

=== Best awards ===
- Best Actor
- Best Actress
- Best Supporting Actor
- Best Supporting Actress
- Best Upcoming Actor
- Best Upcoming Actress
- Best Director
- Best Art Director
- Best Teledrama Series
- Best Single Episode
- Best Makeup Artist
- Best Cameraman
- Best Editor
- Best Music Director
- Best Script
- Best Lyrics
- Best Singer
- Best Current Affairs
- Best Documentary
- Best Musical Program
- Best Magazine Program
- Best Presenter
- Best Children's Program
- Best Educational Program
- Best Sports Program
- Best Women's Program
- Best Audio Visual Program

=== Awards based on popular vote ===
- Popular Actor
- Popular Actress
- Popular Teledrama
- Popular Television Programme

=== Commercial awards ===
- Best Commercial

=== Talent awards ===
- Sumathi Merit Awards
- Sumathi Jury Awards

=== Child awards ===
- Best Child Actor

=== Special awards ===
- U.W. Sumathipala Awards

=== News and Broadcasting awards ===
- Best Announcer
- Best Investigative Reporting
- Best Current Reporting

== Award ceremonies ==
=== 1995 Sumathi Awards ===
The first Sumathi Awards ceremony was celebrated in 1995, where 32 awards were given at the ceremony under 4 categories. In the best award category, Sumathi Award for the best teledrama actor was won by Buddhadasa Vithanarachchi and best teledrama actress was Manel Jayasena. In popular award category, Kamal Addararachchi won the most popular actor award, whereas Nilmini Tennakoon won the most popular actress award. Out of 32 awards given, teledrama Dandubasnamanaya won 12 awards, including best actor, supporting actor, television series, director and music director.

=== 1996 Sumathi Awards ===
The second Sumathi Awards ceremony was celebrated in 1996, where 33 awards were given at the ceremony under 5 categories. In the best award category, Sumathi Award for the best teledrama actor was won by Lucky Dias and best teledrama actress was Chandani Seneviratne, whereas both won popular award categories as well. For the first time, U.W. Sumathipala memorial award was introduced, where veteran director Titus Thotawatte won this lifetime award. Out of 33 awards given, teledrama Sankranthi Samaya won 6 awards, including best actor, music director, singer and most popular teledrama.

=== 1997 Sumathi Awards ===
The third Sumathi Awards ceremony was celebrated in 1997 at the Sugathadasa Indoor Stadium on November 28, 1997, at 6.00 pm. The National Youth Services Council and Sumathi Newspapers (Pvt) Ltd jointly organized the event where 38 prizes were offered to the winners in various categories of teledrama production including youth award. A cash prize of SL Rs 50,000 was awarded to the best teledrama series and best single episode teledrama was awarded a cash prize of SL Rs 20,000.

In the best award category, Sumathi Award for the best teledrama actor was won by Jackson Anthony and the best teledrama actress was Malani Fonseka. In popular award category, Jeewan Kumaranatunga won the most popular actor award, whereas Vasanthi Chathurani won the most popular actress award. The U.W. Sumathipala memorial award was given to the king of Sinhala cinema, Gamini Fonseka. Out of 38 awards given, teledrama Pitagamkarayo won 9 awards, including best actor, actress, director, script and television series.

=== 1998 Sumathi Awards ===
The fourth Sumathi Awards ceremony was celebrated at the Sugathadasa Indoor Stadium on 28 November 2011, where 38 awards were given at the ceremony under 5 categories. A cash prize of Rs 50,000/- was awarded to the best teledrama serial and a cash prize of Rs 20,000/ was awarded to the best single episode teledrama. In the best award category, Sumathi Award for the best teledrama actor was won by Asoka Peiris and best teledrama actress was Vasanthi Chathurani. In the popular award category, Palitha Silva won the most popular actor award, whereas Yashoda Wimaladharma won the most popular actress award. For the first time, the U.W.S Sumathipala memorial award was given to two personalities, veteran actress Denawaka Hamine and music director Hugo Fernando. Out of 31 awards given, teledramas Vilambheetha and Durganthaya won 4 awards each.

=== 1999 Sumathi Awards ===
The fifth Sumathi Awards ceremony was celebrated at the Sugathadasa Indoor Stadium on 6 November 1999, where 31 awards were given at the ceremony under 5 categories. Tourism and Aviation Minister Dharmasiri Senanayake and Sports and Youth Affairs Minister S. B. Dissanayake took part as the chief guests. The cash prize of Rs 50,000 was given to the best television serial and cash prize of Rs 20,000 was given to the best single episode serial. In the best award category, Sumathi Award for the best teledrama actor was won by Suminda Sirisena and best teledrama actress was Chandani Seneviratne. In popular award category, Sriyantha Mendis won the most popular actor award, whereas Yashoda Wimaladharma won the most popular actress award for the second consecutive time. The U.W. Sumathipala memorial award was given to, veteran director K. A. W. Perera and veteran actor Joe Abeywickrama. Out of 31 awards given, teledrama Nisala Vila won 8 awards, including best actor, actress, director and music director.

=== 2000 Sumathi Awards ===
The sixth Sumathi Awards ceremony was celebrated at the Sugathadasa Indoor Stadium on 9 December 2000, where 36 awards were given at the ceremony under 5 categories. Meanwhile, 7 youth awards were presented by National Youth Services Council. In the best award category, Sumathi Award for the best teledrama actor was won by Joe Abeywickrama and best teledrama actress was Nilmini Tennakoon. In popular award category, Lucky Dias won the most popular actor award, whereas Yashoda Wimaladharma won the most popular actress award for the third consecutive time. The U.W. Sumathipala memorial award was given to, veteran actor Tony Ranasinghe and veteran actor Christy Leonard Perera. Out of 31 awards given, teledrama Imadiya Mankada won 6 awards, including best actor, director, television series and supporting actor.

=== 2001 Sumathi Awards ===
The seventh Sumathi Awards ceremony was celebrated in year 2001, where 34 awards were given at the ceremony under 5 categories. In the best award category, Sumathi Award for the best teledrama actor was won by Sriyantha Mendis and best teledrama actress was Malani Fonseka. In popular award category, Channa Perera won the most popular actor award, whereas Yashoda Wimaladharma won the most popular actress award for the fourth consecutive time. The U.W. Sumathipala memorial award was given to, veteran actress Iranganie Serasinghe and queen of Sinhala cinema, Malani Fonseka. Out of 34 awards given, the teledrama Kemmura won 6 awards, including best actress, director, television series and supporting actress.

=== 2002 Sumathi Awards ===
The eighth Sumathi Awards ceremony was celebrated in the year 2002, where 38 awards were given in the ceremony under 6 categories. In the best award category, Sumathi Award for the best teledrama actor was won by Jayalath Manoratne and best teledrama actress was Vasanthi Chathurani. In popular award category, Channa Perera won the most popular actor award for second time, whereas Yashoda Wimaladharma won the most popular actress award for the fifth consecutive time. The U.W. Sumathipala memorial award was given to, veteran actor, director Henry Jayasena and veteran actor Ravindra Randeniya. Out of 38 awards given, the teledrama Sanda Amawakai won 8 awards, including best actor, director, television series and cameraman.

=== 2003 Sumathi Awards ===
The ninth Sumathi Awards ceremony was celebrated in year 2003, where 36 awards were given at the ceremony under 6 categories. In the best award category, Sumathi Award for the best teledrama actor was won by Mahendra Perera and best teledrama actress was Sasanthi Jayasekara. In popular award category, Channa Perera won the most popular actor award for the third consecutive time, whereas Kanchana Mendis won the most popular actress award. The U.W. Sumathipala memorial award was given to, veteran actors Sathischandra Edirisinghe and Robin Fernando. Out of 36 awards given, teledrama Hada Wila Sakmana won 7 awards, including best actor, actress, director and television series.

=== 2004 Sumathi Awards ===
The tenth Sumathi Awards ceremony was celebrated in year 2004, where 38 awards were given at the ceremony under 5 categories. In the best award category, Sumathi Award for the best teledrama actor was won by Suminda Sirisena and the best teledrama actress was Duleeka Marapana. In the popular award category, Roshan Pilapitiya won the most popular actor award, whereas Nayana Kumari won the most popular actress award. The U.W. Sumathipala memorial award was given to, veteran actor Wijeratne Warakagoda and queen of Sri Lankan music Latha Walpola. Out of 38 awards given, teledrama Ramya Suramya won 5 awards, including best actor, director, television series and supporting actress.

=== 2006 Sumathi Awards ===
The eleventh Sumathi Awards ceremony was celebrated in year 2006, where 38 awards were given at the ceremony under 6 categories. In the best award category, Sumathi Award for the best teledrama actor was won by Jayalal Rohana and best teledrama actress was Duleeka Marapana, for the second consecutive time. In popular award category, Roshan Pilapitiya won the most popular actor award for the second consecutive time, whereas Chathurika Peiris won the most popular actress award. The U.W. Sumathipala memorial award was given to, veteran actress Shanthi Lekha and popular broadcaster Shan Wickremesinghe. Out of 38 awards given, teledrama Theth Saha Viyali won 5 awards, including best director, television series, cameraman and supporting actor.

=== 2007 Sumathi Awards ===
The twelfth Sumathi Awards ceremony was celebrated in year 2006, where 38 awards were given at the ceremony under 6 categories. In the best award category, Sumathi Award for the best teledrama actor was won by Janak Premalal and best teledrama actress was Damitha Abeyratne. In popular award category, Suraj Mapa won the most popular actor award, whereas Oshadhi Hewamadduma won the most popular actress award. The U.W. Sumathipala memorial award was given to, veteran singer Nanda Malini and veteran actor Stanley Perera. Out of 38 awards given, the teledrama Katu Imbula won 6 awards, including best actor, television series, music director and supporting actor.

=== 2008 Sumathi Awards ===
The thirteenth Sumathi Awards ceremony was celebrated at the Bandaranaike Memorial International Conference Hall on 14 June 2008. 38 awards were given at the ceremony under 6 categories. In the best award category, Sumathi Award for the best teledrama actor was won by Roger Seneviratne and best teledrama actress was Chandani Seneviratne. In the popular award category, Roshan Ranawana won the most popular actor award, whereas Manjula Kumari won the most popular actress award. The U.W. Sumathipala memorial award was given to, veteran director Roy de Silva and veteran actor Rex Kodippili. Out of 38 awards given, teledramas Rala Bindena Thena and Sandagalatanna won 5 awards each.

=== 2009 Sumathi Awards ===
The fourteenth Sumathi Awards ceremony was celebrated at the Sugathadasa Indoor Stadium on 24 October 2009, accompanied by Nature's Secrets and MassCom Limited. First Lady Shiranthi Rajapaksa took part as the chief guest. 41 awards were given at the ceremony under 6 categories. In the best award category, Sumathi Award for the best teledrama actor was won by Sriyantha Mendis and best teledrama actress was Vasanthi Chathurani. In popular award category, Chandika Nanayakkara won the most popular actor award, whereas Nehara Peiris won the most popular actress award. The U.W. Sumathipala memorial award was given to, veteran actresses Clarice de Silva and Jeevarani Kurukulasuriya.

=== 2010 Sumathi Awards ===
The fifteenth Sumathi Awards ceremony was celebrated at the Sugathadasa Indoor Stadium on 16 October 2009 with the participation of Shiranthi Rajapaksa as the chief guest. 40 awards were given at the ceremony under 6 categories. In the best award category, Sumathi Award for the best teledrama actor was won by Sriyantha Mendis and best teledrama actress was Duleeka Marapana. In popular award category, Chandika Nanayakkara won the most popular actor award for the second consecutive time, whereas Umayangana Wickramasinghe won the most popular actress award. The U.W. Sumathipala memorial award was given to, veteran artist Sunil Ariyaratne and veteran actress Sriyani Amarasena. Out of 40 awards given, the teledrama Ridee Ittankaraya won 7 awards including the best actress, director, cameraman and supporting actor.

=== 2011 Sumathi Awards ===
The sixteenth Sumathi Awards ceremony was celebrated at the Sugathadasa Indoor Stadium on 16 November 2011 with the participation of Shiranthi Rajapaksa as the chief guest. 54 awards were given at the ceremony under 7 categories. In the best award category, Sumathi Award for the best teledrama actor was won by Roshan Ravindra and best teledrama actress was Himali Sayurangi. In popular award category, Saranga Disasekara won the most popular actor award, whereas Udari Warnakulasooriya won the most popular actress award. The U.W. Sumathipala memorial award was given to, veteran actress Anula Karunathilaka and veteran singer Angeline Gunathilake. Out of 54 awards given, teledrama Thaksalawa won 7 awards including best actress, director, television series and supporting actor.

=== 2012 Sumathi Awards ===
The seventeenth Sumathi Awards ceremony was celebrated at the Bandaranaike Memorial International Conference Hall on 3 December 2012, accompany with Lux. 50 awards were given at the ceremony under 7 categories. In the best award category, Dinesh Subasinghe has won the Best Music Director Award.& Sumathi Award for the best teledrama actor was won by Jagath Chamila and best teledrama actress was Samdhi Laksiri. In popular award category, Dananjaya Siriwardana won the most popular actor award, whereas Nadeesha Hemamali won the most popular actress award. The U.W. Sumathipala memorial award was given to, veteran actor Cyril Wickramage and veteran musician Victor Rathnayake. Out of 50 awards given, the teledrama Swaynjatha won 7 awards including best actress, director, television series and supporting actor.

=== 2013 Sumathi Awards ===
The eighteenth Sumathi Awards ceremony was celebrated at the Bandaranaike Memorial International Conference Hall on 30 October 2013 with the participation of Shiranthi Rajapaksa as the chief guest. 52 awards were given at the ceremony under 7 categories. In the best award category, Sumathi Award for the best teledrama actor was won by Wishwajith Gunasekara and best teledrama actress was Kanchana Mendis. In the popular award category, Wishwanath Kodikara won the most popular actor award, whereas Dinakshie Priyasad won the most popular actress award. The U.W. Sumathipala memorial award was given to, veteran actress Punya Heendeniya and veteran musician Sanath Nandasiri. Out of 52 awards given, teledrama Me Wasantha Kalayay won 5 awards including best actress, actress, director and television series.

=== 2014 Sumathi Awards ===
The nineteenth Sumathi Awards ceremony was celebrated in year 2014, where 57 awards were given at the ceremony under 8 categories. In the best award category, Sumathi Award for the best teledrama actor was won by Jackson Anthony and best teledrama actress was Paboda Sandeepani. In popular award category, Wishwanath Kodikara won the most popular actor award for the second consecutive time, whereas Ruwangi Rathnayake won the most popular actress award. The U.W. Sumathipala memorial award was given to, veteran composer Rohana Weerasinghe and veteran singer Sujatha Aththanayaka. Out of 57 awards given, teledrama Appachchi won 9 awards including best actor, actress, director and television series.

=== 2015 Sumathi Awards ===
The twentieth Sumathi Awards ceremony accompany with Anchor, was celebrated at the Nelum Pokuna Theatre on 9 July 2015 with the participation of President Maithripala Sirisena as the chief guest. 53 awards were given at the ceremony under 8 categories. In the best award category, Sumathi Award for the best teledrama actor was won by Janak Premalal and best teledrama actress was Thisuri Yuwanika. In popular award category, Kavinga Perera won the most popular actor award, whereas Shalani Tharaka won the most popular actress award. The U.W. Sumathipala memorial award was given to, popular artist, journalist A. D. Ranjith Kumara and veteran singer Indrani Wijebandara. Out of 53 awards given, teledrama Girikula won 7 awards including best actor, actress, television series, music director and supporting actress.

=== 2016 Sumathi Awards ===
The 21st Sumathi Awards ceremony was celebrated at the Bandaranaike Memorial International Conference Hall on 18 August 2016 with the participation of President Maithripala Sirisena as the chief guest. 55 awards were given at the ceremony under 8 categories. In the best award category, Sumathi Award for the best teledrama actor was won by Sriyantha Mendis and best teledrama actress was Nilmini Tennakoon. In popular award category, Kavinga Perera won the most popular actor award for the second consecutive time, whereas Ishara Sandamini won the most popular actress award. The U.W. Sumathipala memorial award was given to, veteran actor Amarasiri Kalansuriya and veteran actress Anoja Weerasinghe. Out of 55 awards given, teledrama Daskon won 12 awards including best actor, director, television series, music director and cameraman.

=== 2017 Sumathi Awards ===
The 22nd Sumathi Awards ceremony was celebrated at the Nelum Pokuna Theatre on 20 September 2017 with the participation of Honorable speaker Karu Jayasuriya as the chief guest. In the best award category, Sumathi Award for the best teledrama actor was won by Sumith Rathnayake and best teledrama actress was Umali Thilakarathne. In popular award category, Kavinga Perera won the most popular actor award for the third consecutive time, whereas Nayanathara Wickramaarchchi won the most popular actress award. The U.W. Sumathipala memorial award was given to, veteran actress Nita Fernando and Swarna Mallawarachchi. Out of 43 awards given, teledrama Maddahana won 9 awards including best actor, director, television series, script and lyrics.

=== 2018 Sumathi Awards ===
The 23rd Sumathi Awards was held at Nelum Pokuna Mahinda Rajapaksa Theatre on 29 August 2018. In the best award category, Sumathi Award for the best teledrama actor was won by Shyam Fernando and best teledrama actress was Nadee Kammalweera. In popular award category, Raween Kanishka won the most popular actor award, whereas Shalani Tharaka won the most popular actress award. The U.W. Sumathipala memorial award was given to, veteran actor Tissa Wijesurendra and veteran actress Geetha Kumarasinghe. Out of 43 awards given, teledrama See Raja won 9 awards including best actor, director, television series, script and lyrics.

=== 2019 Sumathi Awards ===
The 24th Sumathi Awards was held at Nelum Pokuna Mahinda Rajapaksa Theatre on 24 October 2019. In the best award category, Sumathi Award for the best teledrama actor was won by Uddika Premarathna and best teledrama actress was Thisuri Yuwanika. In popular award category, Sumiran Gunasekara won the most popular actor award, whereas Nayomi Thakshila won the most popular actress award. The U.W. Sumathipala memorial award was given to, veteran actor Alexander Fernando and veteran actress Sumana Amarasinghe. Out of 43 awards given, teledrama Thaththa won 9 awards including best director, television series, supportive actor and supportive actress.

=== 2021 Sumathi Awards ===
The 25th Sumathi Awards was held at Waters Edge on 26 March 2021. The Sumathi Awards Committee has decided to evaluate the creations of the year 2020, even though the awards ceremony scheduled to be held in 2020 had to be postponed due to the global COVID-19 health epidemic rules. Audiences was also able to watch the awards ceremony live on the Sumathi Awards Facebook page on March 26. For the first time, two awards being presented: Pulse.lk won the Best Digital Award for National Interest while Manusath Derana won the Best Digital Award for CSR Activation. In the best award category, Sumathi Award for the best teledrama actor was won by Roshan Ravindra and best teledrama actress was Samanalee Fonseka. In popular award category, Sajitha Anuththara won the most popular actor award, whereas Senali Fonseka won the most popular actress award. The U.W. Sumathipala memorial award was given to, veteran actor Douglas Ranasinghe and veteran actress Manel Wanaguru. Out of 60 awards given, teledrama Weeraya Gedara Awith won 7 awards including best director, best actor, television series, supportive actress and child actor.

=== 2023 Sumathi Awards ===
The 27th Sumathi Awards was held at Water’s Edge Hotel, Colombo on 9 February 2023 and awarded the performances in the years 2020 and 2021. In the 2020 best award category, Sumathi Award for the best teledrama actor was won by Dasun Pathirana and best teledrama actress was Udari Warnakulasooriya. For the year 2021, Thusitha Laknath won the best teledrama actor award and Umali Thilakarathne won the best teledrama actress award. In popular award category, Uddika Premarathna won the most popular actor award, whereas Dusheni Miyurangi won the most popular actress award. The U.W. Sumathipala memorial award was given to, veteran songstress Indrani Perera and veteran actress Sanath Gunathilake. Overall 90 awards were given for the years 2020 and 2021 excellences. For the year 2020, teledrama Thanamalvila Kollek won 5 awards including best director, best script and supportive actress. For the year 2021, teledrama Sakarma won 9 awards including best actor, best actress, best director and best teledrama.

=== 2024 Sumathi Awards ===
The 29th Sumathi Awards was held at Monarch Imperial on 20 February 2024 and awarded the performances in the years 2022 and 2023. In the 2022 best award category, Sumathi Award for the best teledrama actor was won by Madura Prabhashwara and best teledrama actress was Nayomi Thakshila. For the year 2022, Jagath Manuwarna won the best teledrama actor award and Semini Iddamalgoda won the best teledrama actress award. In popular award category, Saranga Disasekara won the most popular actor award, whereas Dusheni Miyurangi won the most popular actress award for the second consecutive time. The U.W. Sumathipala memorial award was given to, veteran director Dharmasiri Bandaranayake and veteran singer Priya Suriyasena. Overall 90 awards were given for the years 2020 and 2021 excellences. For the year 2022, teledrama Andungira won 7 awards including best actress, best director, best cameraman and supportive actress. For the year 2023, teledrama Kodi Gaha Yata won 10 awards including best actor, best teledrama, best director and best supporting actor and actress.

=== 2025 Sumathi Awards ===
The 30th Sumathi Awards Coming Soon

== See also ==
- List of Asian television awards
