= Saddha Mangala Sooriyabandara =

Sri Lankan journalist and media personality

Saddha Mangala Sooriyabandara සද්ධා මංගල සුරියබණ්ඩාර
- Born: Saddha Mangala Sooriyabandara; 19 June 1968 (age 58); Kandy, Sri Lanka
- Education: St. Anthony's College, Kandy
- Occupations: Journalist, media director, TV presenter, actor, script writer, lyricist
- Years active: 1994–present
- Spouse: Chethani Priyanga Wijetunga
- Children: Induwara Sooriyabandara
- Relatives: Chandana Sooriyabandara (Brother); Tharaka Wasalamudaliarachchi (sister-in-law)

Saddha Mangala Sooriyabandara (born 19 June 1968; Sinhala: සද්ධා මංගල සුරියබණ්ඩාර) is a Sri Lankan journalist and media personality. He is best known for the television programs Angili Salakuna and Always Breakdown. He has worked as a program director, and before the public as a film and teledrama screenwriter, teledrama producer, television program director, journalist, announcer, songwriter and actor.

Sooriyabandara is the screenwriter of the popular television serials Haara Kotiya, Nadagamkarayo, and currently has written nearly 20 television serials.

== Family background ==
He was born on 19 June 1968 in the village of Watapuluwa, about 5 km from Kandy, as the second son in the family with four siblings. His father Lionel Sooriyabandara was a music teacher and sitarist who holds a degree in music from Heywood Institute of Arts (University of the Visual and Performing Arts). He also worked in art and stage drama. His mother Sulochana Gamage was also a music student at the same college with his father. Saddha's childhood was spent in the art environment at home, and he was inspired to do art by his father. He has one elder brother, Chandana, one younger brother, Chathura and one younger sister, Apsara.

Saddha completed his primary education at Watapuluwa Junior School and later passed the Grade 5 Scholarship Examination in 1979. Then he entered St. Anthony's College, Kandy in 1980 to complete his secondary education. During his school days, he was involved in various drama activities and excelled in stage drama production and acting, art, singing, oratory and debate, and writing. He is also an athlete and has represented the school at the national level in the 110m hurdles.

Saddha has two brothers (Chandana and Chathura) and one sister (Apsara). His elder brother Chandana is also a senior journalist in Sri Lanka and is currently the Executive Officer of Sirasa TV, who became the Channel Head in 2015. Chandana has been involved in several television programs as the program director and with the quiz program Obada Lakshapathi Mamada Lakshapathi and political program Satana. In 2018, Chandana was appointed as the head of Sirasa Stein Studios.

Chandana is married to journalist, author, actress and television announcer Tharaka Wasalamudaliarachchi. They have two sons: Gimhan, Muniwara and Nimna. In 2006, Tharaka won The Outstanding Young Person's Award for her contribution to media. She has acted in the television serial Udu Viyan. She worked as a journalist on Swarnavahini for about 15 years and hosted the program Helidarawwa. and then wrote the novels Andaramandiya to which she won the Presidential Youth award, Dehi, Mati and Kalu which she was nominated for a Swarna Pusthaka Award. Later she published Aes, Paata, Indrachapa, Guru, Kaasi and Neela Nimna.

== Personal life ==
Saddha is married to his longtime partner, Warnakulasuriya Patambandige Chethani Wijetunga, whom he met during the work at the Alcohol and Drug Information Center (ADIC). She is a past pupil of Ananda Balika Vidyalaya, Colombo. She volunteered for ADIC and later joined TNL Television. After that, she worked as a journalist for an alternative newspaper called 'Iskra' and later joined Lakhanda radio in 1999 as a news reporter. She has also worked as a freelance TV presenter on Rupavahini. She and her husband started the Institute of Media and Performing Arts (IMPAS) in 2003. Simultaneously, she and Saddha started a television production house called Fingerprint media solutions with the aim of creating commercial productions and TV commercials. From 2006 to 2009 she worked for Nature's Secrets, a leading cosmetics company in Sri Lanka. In 2013, she started 'Studio LK', a studio complex headed by her, which has filmed a number of Hollywood and Sri Lankan movies, large-scale reality shows, and TV commercials. Apart from that, she holds a Diploma in Journalism from the University of Colombo and has studied Journalism from Fojo, an affiliate of Kalma University, Sweden.

They have one son (Induwara) who is a musician. He was born on 29 August 2000 and educated at Isipathana College, Colombo. He is pursuing a Diploma in Sound and Music Technology from the 'Hit Factory Audio Institute' led by Ranga Dasanayake and following a Sangeeth Visharad degree in Music from the Bhatkhande Music Institute Deemed University. At the age of 19, Induwara became the music director of the teledrama Agni Piyapath, the youngest music composer in Sri Lanka. Apart from that, he also composed music for the teledramas Agni Piyapath and Malwara Mal. In 2021, Induwara made his maiden teledrama acting with the serial Paara Dige.

== Early career ==
During his G.C.E Advanced Level examination in 1987/88, the Janatha Vimukthi Peramuna (JVP) launched an armed insurgency in Sri Lanka and there was severe terror in the Kandy area at that time. State terror against the JVP was escalating to the point of killing young people on the streets. Saddha chose nursing instead of his preferred field of art, as it was dangerous to stay home after high school. In 1989, Saddha joined the Katugastota Hospital as a trainee nursing officer and later entered the Kandy Nursing College for nursing training. However, he left the Nursing School before completing his training.

Then he joined the Alcohol and Drug Information Center (ADIC), an NGO-NORAD sponsored NGO working for drug prevention in Sri Lanka. Previously along with his brother, Saddha had volunteered for drug prevention during school times. Later he was appointed as the permanent member of ADIC. Saddha later founded LIFE – Drug Prevention Movement in Kandy as a project of ADIC, where he became its Project Director at a young age. After quit from ADIC in 1993, he worked briefly as a sales executive at EL-Club, a garment factory.

Meanwhile, he completed a Diploma in Journalism from the University of Colombo and the University of Sri Jayewardenepura.

== Media career ==
=== In Television channels ===
In 1994, Saddha started his media career as a freelance TV presenter for the one of privately owned television channels in Sri Lanka: TNL TV. After that, he had the opportunity to work as a news anchor for the first news broadcast on a private TV channel in Sri Lanka. Then in 1995, he got the opportunity to cover the visit of a peace delegation troupe from the South to Jaffna LTTE area, while he was working as a freelance presenter for TNL. During that visit he had his first televised interview which was with LTTE theorist Anton Balasingham. After that successfully reporting on his Jaffna visit, Saddha was recruited to the permanent staff of TNL on 15 February 1995 and got a job as a news coordinator in the news division.

During his tenure as a news reporter for TNL, Saddha worked as a news anchor as well as a program producer. He produced the television program Always Breakdown. He used hand puppets in the program and parodied well-known political figures in a comedic roles. Initially, the script was written by someone else, but later Saddha wrote and directed the script and voiced the characters 'Labores', the puppet character of the then Labor Minister Mahinda Rajapaksa.

In 1996, he was covering an LTTE bombing in front of the Army Headquarters in Colombo when he was seriously injured by another suicide bomber. Since then, he has covered a number of LTTE suicide attacks in Sri Lanka. In 1998, Saddha left the Always Breakdown program due to a conflict of opinion with the TNL administration and left the station. In the same year, he joined as a program producer in News and current affairs division for Sri Lanka Rupavahini Corporation. He created various television programs and also worked as a presenter and interviewer for Rupavahini for many years. In 2001, he became a news anchor for Rupavahini.

While on Rupavahini, his best-known program was Angili Salakuna ('The Fingerprint'), a crime investigation program. It was aired at 9.30 pm on Tuesday and became one of the highest grossing shows of all time in Sri Lanka. He also directed the script as well as the narration of Angili Salakuna. At the peak of its ratings, Saddha was removed from the program due to his rejection of attempts by the then rulers to use the program for their own political purposes. Later he was transferred to the documentary and religious division. In addition to Angili Salakuna, he created the programs Uththamachara and Tele Kolama. He was also a prolific political show host who hosted the political programs such as Janamandali, Eththa Netta, Kathiraya for Rupavahini. He left the Rupavahini in 2006.

In 2009 he was invited to become the Program Manager of the television channel Siyatha TV. He left Siyatha TV in 2011 to work full-time in commercials and commercials, and in 2013, Saddha became the creative director of Carlton Sports Network (CSN), Sri Lanka's first sports channel. During this period, he led the development of Elle where he was the CEO of the Sri Lanka Elle Federation. Under his leadership, the Elle National Tournament was held day and night and was telecast live on CSN, for the first time in the history of Sri Lanka sport.

=== Outside television ===
He joined the 'Institute of Media and Performing Arts' (IMPAS), which he co-founded with his wife, Chethani. Through IMPAS, Saddha and Chethani were able to introduce a group of talented journalists, announcers and actors to the field of journalism and acting in Sri Lanka. At the same time, they started a production house called 'Fingerprint Media Solutions', through which they created various commercial programs and advertisements.

Currently, he works as Course Director at the Institute of Media and Performing Arts.

== Drama career ==
In 2001, Saddha wrote his maiden teledrama script, Amara Bhawana. However, he rose to fame as a scriptwriter in 2012 with the creation of his television serial Kalu Araliya. However, he had previously wrote the serials Lambert Saha Somapala and Sudu Gindara. He worked with the director Jayaprakash Sivagurunadan for multiple number of serials including: Kalu Araliya, Anguru Siththam, Hansa Pihatu, Kalu Kurulla, Suraduthiyo, Raja Yogaya, Amuthu Rasikaya and recently Agni Piyapath.

In 2017, he created the television serial Haara Kotiya for Swarnavahini. The serial had a few episodes initially and was nominated for Sumathi Awards and Raigam Tele'es in many award categories. Saddha later produced its sequel, titled Kotipathiyo in 2018.

Saddha has already written the scripts for two films titled Ashawari and Sihinabhisheka. In 2016, he became a teledrama producer with the teledrama Kalu Kurulla aired on ITN. In the same year, he started a production company called 'Maathra Productions' with his production partner Chamara Samarawickrema. Since the inception of the company, all the teledramas he has written have been produced through that company.

He first act as a journalist in the television serial Kahala Nadaya directed by Santhusa Liyanage. In 2017, he acted in the children's film Paha Samath directed by Jayaprakash Sivagurunadan. In 2020, he wrote the television serial Agni Piyapath in which he also played the role of a gangster "Raajan". Meanwhile, he is also a lyricist, who wrote the song Heena Thibunata Kotiyak sung by Shyamen Dangamuwa for the serial Haara Kotiya, song Dahas Ganan Heena Balala for the serial Kotipathiyo and song Heena Lowe Thaniwila for the serial Sillara Samanallu. In 2020, he appeared in the teledrama Agni Piyapath with the supportive role 'Rajan'.

In 2021, he won the special merit award at Sumathi Awards for the script of Amuthu Rasikaya. In the same year, he wrote the script for television serial Nadagamkarayo. The serial became a hallmark in Sri Lankan television, where all the episodes became YouTube trending with more than 1 million views. After the 400th episode, the series was ended and a spin-off series titled Kolam Kuttama was started under Sooriyabandara's script and Sivagurunathan's direction.

== Television serials ==
Year	Television serial	Director	Roles	Channel	Ref.
2001	Amara Bawana	Himself	Director, Scriptwriter	Sirasa TV	
2005	Sorakama	Santhusa Liyanage	Scriptwriter	Rupavahini	
2005	Lembert & Somapala	Namal Sooriyabandara	Scriptwriter	Rupavahini	
2010	Sudu Gindara	Rihan Raveendra	Scriptwriter	Independent Television Network	
2012	Kalu Araliya	Jayaprakash Sivagurunathan	Scriptwriter	Swarnavahini	
2013	Anguru Siththam	Jayaprakash Sivagurunathan	Scriptwriter	Swarnavahini	
2014	Monara Kadadhasi	Christy Shelton Fernando	Scriptwriter	Swarnavahini	
2015	Hansa Pihatu	Jayaprakash Sivagurunathan	Scriptwriter	Swarnavahini	
2016	Kalu Kurulla	Jayaprakash Sivagurunathan	Scriptwriter, Producer	Independent Television Network	
2016	Sura Duthiyo	Jayaprakash Sivagurunathan	Scriptwriter, Producer	Hiru TV	
2017	Haara Kotiya	Jayaprakash Sivagurunathan	Scriptwriter, Producer	Swarnavahini	
2018	Kotipathiyo	Jayaprakash Sivagurunathan	Scriptwriter, Producer	Swarnavahini	
2018	Sillara Samanallu	Sanjaya Nirmal	Scriptwriter, Producer	Swarnavahini	
2018	Rajayogaya	Jayaprakash Sivagurunathan	Scriptwriter, Producer	Independent Television Network	
2018	Aganthukaya	Christy Shelton Fernando	Scriptwriter, Producer	Swarnavahini	
2019	Dadayam Bambaru	Sanjaya Nirmal	Scriptwriter, Producer	Swarnavahini	
2019	Amuthu Rasikaya	Jayaprakash Sivagurunathan	Scriptwriter, Producer	Rupavahini	
2020	Agni Piyapath	Jayaprakash Sivagurunathan	Scriptwriter, Producer, Actor: Raajan	Swarnavahini	
2021	Nadagamkarayo	Jayaprakash Sivagurunathan	Scriptwriter, Producer	Swarnavahini	
2021	Paara Dige	Jayaprakash Sivagurunathan	Scriptwriter	Swarnavahini	
2022	Paara Vasaa Aetha	Jayaprakash Sivagurunathan	Scriptwriter	Swarnavahini	
2022	Kolam Kuttama	Jayaprakash Sivagurunathan	Scriptwriter	Swarnavahini	
2023	Salli Pokuru	Jayaprakash Sivagurunathan	Scriptwriter	Swarnavahini	
2023	Circuskarayo	Jayaprakash Sivagurunathan	Scriptwriter	Sirasa Tv	
2024	Pirimi Lamai	Jayaprakash Sivagurunathan	Scriptwriter	Swarnavahini	
2025	Jahuta	Jayaprakash Sivagurunathan	Scriptwriter	Swarnavahini	

== As a lyricist ==
- Heena Thibunata Kotiyak ('Haarakotiya' theme song) – sung by Shyamen Dangamuwa
- Dahas Ganan Heena Balala ('Kotipathiyo' theme song) – sung by Shyamen Dangamuwa
- Heena Lowe Thaniweela ('Sillara Samanallu' theme song) – sung by Tiran Yap and Sandaruwan Jayasinghe
- Jeewithe Kaviyak Nowe ('Dadayam Bambaru' theme song) – sung by Vinod Alwis and Kaizar Kaiz
- Bodima Bodima ('Hulan Gedara' theme song) – sung by Rodney Warnakula
- Sura Doothiyo (Sura Duthiyo' theme song) – sung by Raini Charuka
- Amara Warama ('Amara Bawana' theme song) – sung by Ravindra Yasas
- Umathu Ginidel ('Agni Piyapath' theme song) – sung by Bachi Susan
- Api Yanawa – sung by Harsha Dhanosh ft. Lokka

== Awards and accolades ==
=== Sumathi Awards ===
Year	Nominee / work	Award	Result
2002	Ilakkaya (Rita John Murder)	Best Television Current Affairs Program	Nominated
2003	Angili Salakuna	Best Television Current Affairs Program	Won
2004	Angili Salakuna	Best Television Current Affairs Program	Nominated
2014	Gam Medde Keli Sellam	Best Television Sports Program	Won
2014	Thathparaya	Best Presenter	Nominated
2017	Haarakotiya	Most Popular Tele Drama	Nominated

=== State Television Awards ===
Year	Nominee / work	Award	Result
2006	Uththamachara	Best Documentary Programme	Won
2006	Uththamachara	Jury Award	Won

=== Raigam Tele'es ===
Year	Nominee / work	Award	Result
2019	Harakotiya Theme Song	Special Jury Award	Won

=== Sumathi Awards ===
Year	Nominee / work	Award	Result
2021	Amuthu Rasikaya script	Merit Award	Won

== See also ==
- Saranga Disasekara
- Mihira Sirithilaka
- Michelle Dilhara
- Shalani Tharaka
