= Haara Kotiya =

2017 Sri Lankan mystery thriller teledrama

- හාර කෝටිය
- Genre: Mystery; Thriller Romantic
- Created by: Saddha Mangala Sooriyabandara
- Developed by: Thiwanka Udagedara
- Screenplay by: Saddamangala Sooriyabandara
- Story by: Saddamangala Sooriyabandara
- Directed by: Jayaprakash Shivagurunathan
- Creative directors: Manoj Wickremasinghe; Jayantha Abeyratne; Amila Premarathne
- Starring: Saranga Disasekara; Rohan Wijetunge; Thushini Fernando; Ruwan Perera; Suraj Mapa; Dinithi Walgamage
- Voices of: Shyamen Dangamuwa
- Theme music composer: Dinesh Dissanayake
- Opening theme: Heena Thibunata Kotiyak Athe Na Eka Rupiyalak (Hara Kotiya) Kotipathiyo Duk Widinawa Kamara Athule (Kotipathiyo)
- Composer: Dinesh Dissanayake
- Country of origin: Sri Lanka
- Original language: Sinhala
- No. of seasons: 2
- No. of episodes: 566

Production
- Production location: Rajagiriya
- Cinematography: Thusitha Anuradha Mayura Kushalya
- Editor: Thiwanka Udagedara
- Running time: 17 to 20 minutes

Original release
- Network: Swarnavahini
- Release: January 4, 2017 – March 8, 2019

Related
- Kotipathiyo (sequel)

Haara Kotiya (Sinhala: හාර කෝටිය) is a 2017 Sri Lankan mystery thriller teledrama broadcast on Swarnavahini. The series is directed by Jayaprakash Sivagurunathan and written by Saddha Mangala Sooriyabandara. The original season ran from 4 January 2017 to 1 January 2018, and the second season, titled as Kotipathiyo, ran from 2 January 2018 to 8 March 2019, shortly after the conclusion of the original season.

The first season stars Saranga Disasekara, Ruwan Perera and Dinithi Walgamage in lead roles along with Rohan Wijetunga and Suraj Mapa in supportive roles. In the second season, the serial continued with newcomer actress Thushini Fernando.

The show was met with overwhelmingly positive reception, and achieved nationwide popularity, with the series beings nominated for Sumathi Awards and Raigam Tele'es in multiple award categories.

== Seasons ==
Season	Title	Episodes	Originally aired	
Season	Title	Episodes	First aired	Last aired
1	Haara Kotiya	259	4 January 2017	1 January 2018
2	Kotipatiyo	307	2 January 2018	8 March 2019

== Plot ==
Two unemployed friends, Lara and Dinka, live in a slum near a city. However, their lives are eventually turned for the better when two men riding a motorcycle throw an unknown briefcase. The news of a bank being robbed and the suspects' arrest spreads fast; it is later revealed that the money stolen is still missing. Lara and Dinka find the briefcase thrown by the men and take it to their home in secret. They open the bag only to discover it contains 400 million rupees. The duo hide the money in various different places, and swear not to use any of the money until the news of the robbery dies down.

Lara meets and befriends Abhisheka, a wealthy girl, although Lara introduces himself as Lala. As this happens, Chamiya, a pickpocket, is shot dead at a robbery and his mentor, Ranjith "Ranji" is criticized by everyone. Ranji realises that Lara and Dinka are hiding a big secret, and follows them. The police also find money hidden across the slum. Lara learns that the stolen money was actually a property of Abhisheka's father, Victor Dunuwila. Ranji falls in love with Lara's widowed sister, Aruni.

The robbers are released and their leader reveals himself as Napoleon, a mastermind thug. Napoleon also begins to come across the money and concludes that someone in the slum had taken the money and hidden it. He kidnaps Ranji and follows him to search for other young ones in the slum. Ranji eventually discovers that it was Dinka and Lara who took the stolen money, and the three of them agree to equally share the money amongst themselves. Lara and Dinka are arrested and the truth about the money is revealed. With the news spreading throughout the slum, Ranji picks money and is shot. The police discovers that money is counterfeit.

Abhisheka realizes Lara's truth and hates him. Her boyfriend, Dilan, forms a rivalry with Lara. Lara learns that Dilan and Napoleon are partners and that Dilan was the mastermind behind the robbery. Lara escapes from thugs and attempts to save Abhisheka. Police uncover counterfeit money in Abhisheka's home and her father is arrested. Dilan engages with Abhisheka while Napoleon flirts with Abhisheka's friend Rashmi. Lara kidnaps Abhisheka and hides her until he gets Abhisheka to realize the truth about Dilan. Abhisheka escapes and flees.

Lara kidnaps Dilan and his two men. Abhisheka confesses the truth that Lara kidnapped her and hid in their place, prompting the police to unsuccessfully search for Lara and crew. Using Dilan's phone, Dinka exposes the truth about Dilan and his secret agent in Abhisheka's house. Later, Abhisheka and Rashmi discover that Manoja, a servant, is an undercover agent of Dilan. When the police show up, Manoja flees. Without news from Dilan, Victor and the police track down Lara and crew. Dinka asks Abhisheka to come and meet her. Rashmi tells the news to Napoleon and Napoleon sends his gang to rescue them and capture Lara and crew. At Dilan's house, Napoleon's gang and Lara's gang engage in a shootout, ending with most of Napoleon's men down, forcing the crew to retreat. Dilan captures Abhisheka and Dilan reveals his truth to them. While escaping, Dilan shoots Abhisheka, fatally injuring her, while Dilan escapes and hides under Napoleon's protection.

Abhisheka soon realises that Lara has feelings for her. She also turns to him, but Lara simply rejects her, noting that their family backgrounds do not match. Meanwhile, Dilan threatens to kill Lara and Napoleon. Rashmi flirts with Napoleon, but he simply rejects her advances. After her recovery, Abhisheka secretly meets with Lara to confess her love to him. Right at that moment, Dilan appears and shoots at Lara. However, amidst the confrontation, one of Napoleon's henchmen shoots Dilan and flees. The police arrive and arrest Lara and Ranji. Abhisheka is disappointed by Lara's response, and leaves the country to go abroad with her family. In the end credits, it is revealed that Dinka was the mastermind behind most of the events of the story. He broke the promise he made with his friends and secretly kept the money, and produced the counterfeit money which was used to frame Abhisheka's father.

Haara Kotiya 2 - Kotipathiyo title card

=== 6 months later ===
Lara and Ranji are released. Underworld don, Dharman, hires them to kill a journalist, Kavishan Perera. Lara and Ranji refuse, angering Dharman. Kavishan is killed by Dharman's henchmen. Lara kills the shooter and flees with Kavishan's fiancée, Anjali, from Dharman and Minister Mothilal Caldera, who masterminded Kavishan's death. Anjali promises to avenge Kavishan and hides in Lara and Ranji's slum.

After Abhisheka went abroad, Lara alone protects Anjali from the thugs and the minister. Ranji sees their old "friend" Dinka in a store and informs Lara and they seek vengeance for the money heist he pulled on the two of them. After some fights and arguments, Dinka befriends Lara and Ranji again. Caldera's daughter Parami returns. Lara and Parami become friends. During a fight in slum, Anjali fatally shoots Caldera, having injuries on herself. Parami has Anjali arrested. Anjali returns and befriends with Dharman's son, Bhathiya. Bhathiya is paralyzed and Anjali takes care of him. Lara meets Abhisheka, who now suffers from a brain tumor. Abhisheka refuses to reunite with him and Lara donates money to Abhisheka's operation. Eventually, Abhisheka recovers and reunites with Lara.

Ranji marries Aruni. Dharman reforms, but is killed during a battle with the police. Anjali abandons her criminal ways. She is caught after her landlord, Piyatissa complains about her. Anjali is fatally shot during a fight, saddening Lara and Dinka. Parami emigrates. Finally, Lara and Dinka have reverted to the life of old-age slum days.

== Cast ==
=== Main ===
- Saranga Disasekara as Lara Kumara – Norbert's son; Aruni's brother; Dinka and Ranji's friend; Abhisheka's love interest-turned-husband
- Rohan Wijetunge as K. G. Supun Ranjith aka Ranji – Kamala's son; Chamiya's former partner; Lara and Dinka's friend; Aruni's second husband
- Ruwan Perera as Dinka – Lara and Ranji's friend
- Thushini Fernando as Anjali – Kavishan's fiancée; Caldera's murderer (dead)
- Roshan Pilapitiya as Minister Mothilal Caldera – Mastermind behind Kavishan's death; Sarojani's husband; Parami's father (dead)
- Chami Senanayake as Dharman – Underworld don; Dulani's husband; Bhathiya and Hiruni's father (dead)
- Senali Fonseka as Dili – Piyatissa and Ambatenne's daughter; Lara's friend, Chamiya's sister
- Suraj Mapa as Nepolion – Main thief at the bank robbery; Rashmi's love interest
- Dinithi Walgamage as Abhisheka Dunuwila – Victor and Manel's elder daughter; Dinithi's sister; Lara's love interest-turned-wife

=== Supportive cast ===
- Ananda Athukorale as Norbert – Lara and Aruni's father
- Nirosha Thalagala as Aruni Kumari – Norbert's daughter; Lara's sister; Ranji's wife; Doni's mother
- Shalani Tharaka as Parami Caldera – Caldera and Sarojini's daughter; Lara's wife
- Sanju Rodrigo as Sarojani Caldera – Caldera's wife; Parami's mother
- Shiromika Fernando as Pushpalatha aka Sudu – Piyatissa's second wife; Shalitha's mother
- Malkanthi Jayasinghe as Ambatanne – Piyatissa's ex-wife; Dili's mother
- Upatissa Balasuriya as Piyatissa – Ambatanne's ex-husband; Sudu's husband; Dili and Shalitha's father
- Sharad Chanduma as Shalitha – Piyatissa and Sudu's son
- Dinesh Silva as Bhathiya aka Bhathi – Dharman and Dulani's son; Hiruni's brother; Anjali's friend
- Hashinika Karaliyadde as Dulani – Dharman's wife; Bhathiya and Hiruni's mother
- Wageesha Salgado as Hiruni – Dharman and Dulani's daughter; Bhathiya's sister
- Eardley Wedamuni as Victor Dunuwila – Owner of 400 million; Manel's husband; Abhisheka and Dinithi's father
- Sangeetha Basnayake as Manel Dunuwila – Victor's wife; Abhisheka and Dinithi's mother
- Lankika Mathotaarachchi as Dinithi Dunuwila – Victor and Manel's younger daughter; Abhisheka's sister
- Sandani Fernando as Rashmi – Abhisheka's friend; Napoleon's love interest
- Janvi Apsara as Doni – Aruni's daughter
- Sudharshani Gelanigama as Kamala, Ranji's mother
- Sanketh Wickramage as Kavishan Perera – Journalist; Anjali's fiancé (dead)
- Anjana Premaratne as DIG
- Dayasiri Hettiarachchi as Police Constable Vithanage
- Geethika Rajapakse as Minister's secretary
- Rukshana Dissanayake as Madhuka – Ranji and Kamala's tenant
- Dimuthu Chinthaka as Piyasiri Appuhami
- Chirantha Ranwala as Nuwan – newspaper editor
- Gavindha Nawarathne as Dilan – Napoleon's partner; Abhisheka's former love interest (dead)

=== Minor cast ===
- Nilukshi Madushika as Bashi (emigrated)
- Kasun Chamara as Chamiya (dead)
- Giriraj Kaushalya (dead)
- Maureen Charuni as Anjali's mother
- Wasantha Kumarasiri as Anjali's father
- Dilum Buddhika as Ranji's slum friend
- Nethalie Nanayakkara as Granny at slum
- Manoj Yalegama as Rathu mudalali
- Ranjan Sooriyakumara as Napoleon's henchman
- Rajasinghe Loluwagoda as Napoleon's henchman
- Udaya Shantha Liyanage as Sub Inspector
- Umeshi Wickramasinghe as Manoja, Dilan's agent in Dunuwila house
- Saman Dharmawansha
- Samudura Premawardhana
- Supun Abeysinghe as himself, dance teacher
- Damith Dilshan
- Ishan Dhanushaka
- Lakshitha Perera
- Anil Chandralal
- Pramila Warnakulasuriya

== Critical response ==
Despite being usual romantic television serials made by Sivagurunathan, the plot of Haara Kotiya expressed beyond those expectations. The series has been shot around slums and towns around Rajagiriya. The story deals with life in the slums and its related complications. However, the plot also explains the love between different levels and journey to become rich and wealth. This changed plot and acting credentials by the actors gave the drama to become one of the most popular television serials in the Sri Lanka. The title song Heena Thibunata Kotiyak by Shyamen Dangamuwa became a popular hit as well.

== Accolades ==
Year	Award	Category	Nominee(s)	Result
2017	Sumathi Awards	Sumathi Most Popular Actor Award	Ruwan Perera	Nominated
2017	Sumathi Awards	Sumathi Most Popular Actor Award	Saranga Disasekara	Nominated
2017	Sumathi Awards	Sumathi Most Popular Actress Award	Dinithi Walgamage	Nominated
2017	Sumathi Awards	Sumathi Most Popular Teledrama Award	Haara Kotiya	Nominated
2017	Raigam Tele'es	Most Popular Actor Award	Ruwan Perera	Won
2017	Raigam Tele'es	Most Popular Actor Award	Saranga Disasekara	Nominated
2017	Raigam Tele'es	Most Popular Actor Award	Rohan Wijetunga	Nominated
2017	Raigam Tele'es	Most Popular Actress Award	Dinithi Walgamage	Nominated
2019	Raigam Tele'es	Raigam Tele'es Jury Awards	Saddha Mangala Sooriyabandara (lyrics)	Won
2019	Raigam Tele'es	Raigam Tele'es Jury Awards	Dinesh Dissanayake (composer)	Won
2019	Raigam Tele'es	Raigam Tele'es Jury Awards	Shyamen Dangamuwa (Singer)	Won
2019	Raigam Tele'es	Best Upcoming Teledrama Actor Award	Rohan Wijetunga	Nominated
