= Nalin Pradeep Udawela =

Sri Lankan actor and politician (1969–2025)

- නලීන් ප්‍රදීප් උඩවෙල

Member of the Western Provincial Council
- In office 2014–2018

Personal details
- Born: Udawela Lekumlage Nalin Pradeep Udawela; 20 March 1969 Matale, Dominion of Ceylon
- Died: 23 September 2025 (aged 56) Maharagama, Sri Lanka
- Party: Democratic Party
- Spouse: Dilhani Udawela (2002–2025)
- Children: 2
- Education: Bandarapola Maha Vidyalaya
- Occupation: Actor, theatre director, editor, set designer
- Awards: Best Actor

Udawela Lekumlage Nalin Pradeep Udawela (Sinhala: උඩවෙල ලේකම්ලාගේ නලීන් ප්‍රදීප් උඩවෙල; 20 March 1969 – 23 September 2025) was a Sri Lankan actor and politician. Udawela acted primarily in stage dramas and television but also acted in films. Udawela served as a member of the Western Provincial Council.

== Personal life ==
Nalin Pradeep Udawela was born on 20 March 1969 in Deniyakumbura village, Matale, Sri Lanka as the youngest of the family. His father died 10 days before he was born. He had three elder brothers and two elder sisters. He completed education from Bandarapola Maha Vidyalaya. He excelled in sports in school times, where he became the best Under-17 player in a year. Apart from sports, he also participated in debate programs and literary inter school tournaments. He completed Advanced Level from art stream in the middle of 1989 JVP riots.

He was married to Dilhani, who worked in the news department, in 2002. The couple has two sons: Chirath and Kalindu.

== Acting career ==
In 1988 while studying in the school he wrote, directed and acted in a short play on the school stage under the theme of Duppathun Nathi Lokayak produced by G. B. Senanayake. The play was later selected from the provincial level to the all-island level and finally won the award for the Best Play. Then in 1989, he joined and completed the drama and performing arts course at the Youth Services Council. After completing the course with excellent grades, Udawela was selected into Tower Hall Foundation conducted by Sunanda Mahendra. During this period, he acted in the Youth play Sevaneli Saha Minissu produced by Prasanna Jayakody and then in the play Megha produced by Ranjith Dharmakeerthi in 1991 and 1992 respectively. Both dramas were awarded at the Youth Awards Festival for Best Drama, Best Set Design and Best Supporting Actor in 1992.

In 1993, Udawela was employed as a trainee film editor at the Government Film Division of the Government Information Department, where the training period was an assignment related to training at the National Apprenticeship Board under Augan Weerakkody. After the training in 1998, he was appointed to the permanent service and continued to work until death to the editing of documentary films in the Government Film Division.

Udawela began his film career in 1998 with Julietge Bhumikawa, directed by Jackson Anthony. Meanwhile he started to act in several stage dramas. In 1999, Udawela won the Best Actor Award at the State Drama Festival for his dramatic performance in the play Deveni Mahinda produced by K. B. Herath. Since then, he acted in many popular stage plays such as: Jūriya, Kelaṇi Pālama, Mænḍelā Mænḍelā, Mēgha, Mī Harak, Nava Huṇuvaṭayē Kathāva and Suddek Oba Amathai.

His most popular cinema acting came through the films Tharaka Mal, Parawarthana and Asai Man Piyabanna. In 2007, he won Merit awards for the supporting roles in the films: Tharaka Mal and Aasai Mang Piabanna.

Apart from cinema and theatre, Udawela dominated the television serials where he appeared in many popular serials back to back in every year. His first teledrama was Andare directed by Christy Nelson. Some of his popular serials include: Akuru Mækī Nǣ, Aparṇā, Bāloli, Baṭṭī, Aehi Pillamak Yaṭa, Aeth Kanda Lihiṇi, Millǣva Walawwa, Miṇī Gandǣla, Moṇaravila, Nisalavila, Piṇi Wæssa, Ridī Iṭṭankaraya, Kolam Kuttama and Mahathalā Haṭana. He won the merit award for his supporting role in the serial Nisalavila. His final television role came through the serial Adaraneeya Music in mid 2025.

== Political career ==
In 2014, Udawela contested for a seat in the Western Provincial Council as a candidate of the Democratic Party led by Sarath Fonseka. Prior to the election, he was the party organizer for Homagama area. He obtained 13,653 votes and was successfully elected as a councilor.

A few months after his election, Udawela claimed that the government of president Mahinda Rajapaksa offered to pay him Rs. 50 million to cross over to the ruling party, the United People's Freedom Alliance. He alleged that the government had also offered his entire family citizenship in either Canada, Australia or the Netherlands.

== Death ==
Udawela died in Apeksha Hospital, Maharagama on 23 September 2025, at the age of 56 after suffering from cancer. His remains were laid to rest at his residence, No. 193/55, Second Lane, Prasanna Uyana, Mattegoda for public rites. The funeral was held at the Mattegoda Crematorium on 25 September 2025.

== Notable theatre works ==
- Juriya
- Deveni Mahinda
- Kelani Palama
- Mandela Mandela
- Megha
- Modara Mola
- Mee Harak
- New Hunuwataye Kathawa
- Sewaneli Eda Minissu
- Suddek Oba Amathakai

== Selected television serials ==
- Akuru Maki Na
- Andare
- Aparna
- Api Apa Athara
- Baloli
- Batti
- Boralu Para
- Chakrandi
- Diya Ginisilu
- Ehipillamak Yata
- Eth Kanda Lihini
- Gang Dela Nisalai
- Hathwana Kandayama
- Ira Awara
- Isuru Pawura
- Kalu Kumari
- Kasee Salu
- Kinduru Adaviya
- Kolam Kuttama
- Mahathala Hatana
- Meeduma Wage Avidin
- Makulu Del
- Millewa Walawwa
- Minigandela
- Monaravila
- Nisalawila
- Nonimi Yathra
- Peramaga Salakunu
- Piniwassa
- Pinsara Dosthara
- Plat Nowana Flat
- Prakampana
- Ran Mehesi
- Ridee Ittankaraya
- Sadgunakaraya
- Samanalayano
- Samanala Sihinaya
- Sanda Dev Diyani
- Sanda Hiru Tharu
- Sanda Nethi Lova
- Sihina Devduwa
- Siri Dev Bawana
- Sudu Hamine
- Suwanda Padma
- Vasanthaya Avilla

== Filmography ==
Key
†	Denotes film or TV productions that have not yet been released

Year	Film	Role	Ref.
1998	Julietge Bhumikawa		
2000	Rajya Sevaya Pinisai	Janaka's henchman	
2001	Aswesuma	Kaseem	
2007	Tharaka Mal	Kumaran	
2007	Asai Man Piyabanna	Sarath	
2008	Walapatala		
2011	Muthu Salamba		
2014	Parawarthana	Jayasena	
2016	Madhura Charika	Jaye	
2019	Sangile	Monk	
TBA	Akarsha †		
TBA	Angara †		
TBA	Magam Soli †		
TBA	Shesha †		

== Awards and accolades ==
Udawela won several awards at the local stage drama, television and film festivals.

=== Sumathi Awards ===
Year	Nominee / work	Award	Result
1999	Nisala Wila	Merit Award	Won

=== Sarasaviya Awards ===
Year	Nominee / work	Award	Result
2007	Tharaka Mal; Asai Man Piyabanna	Merit Award	Won
