= Sumathi Best Television Announcer Award =

The Sumathi Best Television Announcer Award is presented annually in Sri Lanka by the Sumathi Group of Campany associated with many commercial brands for the best Sri Lankan announcer of the year in television screen.

The award was first given in 2002, under the title best announcer. In 2009, the award was separated for two as Best Announcer and Best Presenter. Since 2011, the award is given to the best three announcers. Following is a list of the winners of this prestigious title since then.

Year	Best Announcer	TV channel
2002	Chamuditha Samarawickrama	TNL TV
2003	Sampath Sri Jayasinghe	Sirasa TV
2004	Hasantha Hettiarachchi	Independent Television Network
2006	Gayan Chinthaka Abeysinghe	Independent Television Network
2007	Rangana de Silva	TNL TV
2008	Harindra Jayalal	Swarnavahini
2009	Chethana Liyanage	Sirasa TV
2010	Chaminda Gunaratne	Sri Lanka Rupavahini Corporation
2011	1st - Sandamali Hewanayake	Sri Lanka Rupavahini Corporation
2011	2nd - Najith Matharage	Independent Television Network
2011	3rd - Dilka Samanmalee	TV Derana
2012	Nadeeka Karunanayake	Swarnavahini
2013	1st - Chawika Gunasekara	Swarnavahini
2013	2nd - Chaminda Gunaratne	Sri Lanka Rupavahini Corporation
2013	3rd - Dilka Samanmalee	TV Derana
2014	1st - Madushan de Silva	Swarnavahini
2014	2nd - Chathura Alwis	TV Derana
2014	3rd - Madhushika Karunaratne	Independent Television Network
2015	1st - Thilini Perera	Swarnavahini
2015	2nd - Sunethra Kumari	Sri Lanka Rupavahini Corporation
2015	3rd - Rangana Seneviratne	TV Derana
2016	1st - Sunethra Kumari	Sri Lanka Rupavahini Corporation
2016	2nd - Imran Hameed	Independent Television Network
2016	3rd - Rangana Seneviratne	TV Derana
2017	1st - Nishanthi Dilrukshi	Independent Television Network
2017	2nd - Ishara Samarasinghe	Swarnavahini
2017	3rd - Nayomi Fernando	
2018	1st - Anurudda Rathnayake	Sri Lanka Rupavahini Corporation
2018	2nd - Amila Munasinghe	Siyatha TV
2018	3rd - Nishadi Ruwanmali	Sri Lanka Rupavahini Corporation
2019	1st - Ishara Samarasinghe	Swarnavahini
2019	2nd - Kalindu Karunaratne	TV Derana
2019	3rd - Vidharshi Nilma	Independent Television Network
2021	1st - Chathura Kodithuwakku	TV Derana
2021	2nd - Dinushi Dheerasinghe	Independent Television Network
2021	3rd - Chavika Gunasekara	Swarnavahini
