= Anuradha Edirisinghe =

Sri Lankan actress (born 1992)

Anuradha Edirisinghe අනුරාධා එදිරිසිංහ
- Born: Edirisinghe Arachchilage Anuradha Subashini Edirisinghe; 1 March 1992 (age 34); Avissawella, Sri Lanka
- Education: Eheliyagoda Central College
- Occupation: Actress
- Years active: 2014–present
- Parents: Mahindarathne Edirisinghe (father); Ranjani Adikari (mother)
- Relatives: Yahampath Edirisinghe

Edirisinghe Arachchillage Anuradha Subashini Edirisinghe (Sinhala: අනුරාධා එදිරිසිංහ; born 1 March 1992),professionally known as Anuradha Edirisinghe, is a Sri Lankan actress recognized for her work in television dramas. She is best known for her performances in teledramas such as Garuda Muhurthaya, Giridevi, Sakarma and Kolan Kuttama. Through her appearances in numerous Sinhala television productions, she has become a familiar face in the Sri Lankan television industry.

== Early life and education ==
Edirisinghe was born in Avissawella, Sri Lanka. She completed her primary education at Pahathgama Roman Catholic Junior School from Grade 1 to Grade 5. Afterwards, she studied at Hanwella Rajasinghe Central College up to Grade 11 and later continued her education at Ehaliyagoda Central College.

== Career ==
Edirisinghe entered the television industry through teledramas and gradually gained recognition for her acting performances.

She became widely known for portraying characters such as Pusubi in Garuda Muhurthaya, Rupika in Giridevi, Deweni in Sakarma and Hiruni in Kolan Kuttama.

She has appeared in several Sri Lankan teledramas including Bro, Kolam Kuttama, Kolamba Ithaliya, Mati Kadulu, Patti Gedara, Thuththiri and Wes.

Apart from television acting, she has also appeared in music videos, short films, commercials and stage dramas.

She performed in the stage play Yathuru Hilen and appeared in advertisements for brands including Arpico Mattress, Lux, Sunlight, Lanwa and Kotagala Kahata. In 2019, she also worked as a presenter for Hiru Top 10.

=== Selected television serials ===
- Ahas Maliga
- Asandhimitha
- Bro
- Eka Gei Minissu
- Garuda Muhurthaya
- Giridevi
- Kolamba Ithaliya
- Kolam Kuttama
- LBW
- Mage Adara Awanaduwa
- Mati Kadulu
- Patti Gedara
- Ravana 1 & 2
- Sakarma
- Thodu
- Thuththiri
- Wes (TV series)

== Awards ==
- 2021 – Best Actress for Garuda Muhurthaya (SIGNIS Awards)
- 2021 – Best Supporting Actress for Sakarma (Raigam Tele'es Awards)
- 2021 – Best Supporting Actress for Giridevi (State Television Awards)

== Personal life ==
Anuradha Edirisinghe was born to Mahindarathne Edirisinghe and Ranjani Adikari. She has one sibling, Yahampath Edirisinghe. She follows Buddhism and is interested in travelling and watching films.
