= Dayaratne Ratagedara =

Sri Lankan filmmaker and director

Dayaratne Ratagedara දයාරත්න රටගෙදර
- Born: Ratagedara Herath Mudiyanselage Dayaratne; 20 February; Kolonnawa, Sri Lanka
- Education: Terrence N. De Silva Maha Vidyalaya; Bhadrawathi School, Polhengoda; Thurstan College
- Occupations: Actor, director, producer, screen writer, make-up artist
- Years active: 1984–present
- Children: 3
- Parents: R. M. H. Bandara (father); K. D. Nandawathi (mother)

Ratagedara Herath Mudiyanselage Dayaratne (si:දයාරත්න රටගෙදර; born 20 February), popularly known as Dayaratne Ratagedara, is a filmmaker in Sri Lankan cinema and a television director. He has produced several critically acclaimed award-winning television serials such as Mahamera Pamula, Bogala Sawundiris and Sitha Niwana Katha. Apart from direction, he is a journalist, television director, assistant costume designer, make-up artist, assistant director and program producer.

== Personal life ==
Dayaratne was born on 20 February as the eldest of the family with six siblings. His father, R. M. H. Bandara from Hanguranketha, Kandy worked as a store manager at Geoffrey Brothers, Colombo. His mother, K. D. Nandawathi was a housewife. He started primary education from Terrence N. De Silva Maha Vidyalaya, Kolonnawa. He used to watch films with his grandmother K.A. D. Magillin. Because of this he had a passion for acting since he was a child. His family moved to Kirulapone when Dayaratne was about 12 years old. Then he went to Bhadrawathi School in Polhengoda where he met his mates, Nihal Silva, Ashoka Senarath Mudalige, and Sanjaya Leelaratne. They all had the passion of acting. He later attended to Thurstan College to complete Advanced Level.

Dayaratne was married and has three daughters – Jinali Piyasari, Gayathri Indeewari and Chathrika Odini.

== Career ==
During school times, his friend Nihal Silva performed a Vesak drama called Sadu Siripa. This marked Dayaratne's maiden acting. After that, Ashoka Senarath did another play. Then Dayaratne also produced a play called Anduru Reyay Sanda Panai. Nihal Silva played the main role whereas Sanjaya Leelaratne and Karunadasa Athukorala made supportive roles. The lyrics of Dayaratne's play were composed by K. D. K. Dharmawardena.

In 1972, he was cast for the film Desa Nisa directed by Lester James Peries under the guidance of V. Upali Perera. However, it was late when he went to Ehetuwewa for his part. Meanwhile, he met Arthur U. Amarasena and got the opportunity to act in 1976 blockbuster film Madol Duwa directed by Lester and then in Gehenu Lamai.

After few roles, he understood that, acting is not his talent. Upali directs him to Hilton Mendis and Ebert Wijesinghe where Dayaratne became an assistant makeup artist. He worked as the assistant costume designer in the films Veera Puran Appu, Thavalama and Gehenu Lamai. Then he went to Multi Pax corporation and joined with Surathura newspaper as a feature writer in 1975 and then in Siththara tabloid. Meanwhile, he continued to work as a make-up artist on the first stage plays of Jayantha Chandrasiri, Thusitha de Silva and Nalan Mendis in the plays Sarasawathi and Mawathe Api. In 1975, Ratagedara won the Best Costume Designer award at the first awards ceremony of the Youth Services Council. After that he met Tissa Abeysekara and at the same time, he got the opportunity to work as the second assistant director for Gamini Hewawitharana's films Anduru Charikawa and Du Daruwo under the guidance of Somaweera Senanayake. Apart from that, he worked as an assistant director in Tissa Abeysekera's Mahagedara, Manmulawel and Sarath Gunaratne's Wathsala Akka and Sunil Ariyaratne's Ahas Maliga.

In 1978, he produced the stage play Garu Lisi. It is the only stage play which involved Clarence Wijewardena. In 1983, Dhamma Jagoda who directs Dayaratne to television where he joined Jathika Rupavahini as a production assistant. Even though he joined as a trainee, he was selected for several programs due to his previous roles in cinema an assistant director. He had the opportunity to be the chief assistant director of several popular cult television serials including Dhamma Jagoda's Palingu Menike, Titus Thotawatte's Ran Kahawanu, Lucien Bulathsinhala's Tharadevi, Thilak Gunawardena's Kumarihami, Bandula Vithanage's Erabadu Mal and Janaka Mallimarachchi's Gimhane Nimaviya.

His maiden teledrama direction came through single episode serial Eka Wahalak Yata written by Somaweera Senanayake. In 1986, he won the award for the best single episode teledrama director at OCIC festival. Then he created more than 20 single episode teledramas such as Seeni John, Dasiyage Rathriya, Mudukku, Parameshwari and Wathura Mala.

His first teledrama was Mahamera Paamula, which was one of two the teledramas banned in Sri Lanka. The other is Somaratne Dissanayake's Avasanda. Due to the ban, he established production company Telenisa. Later he produced many popular teledramas such as Eha Iwura, Dolosmahe Api and Bogala Sawundiris. Dayaratne has studied the art of tele-drama in West Germany, India and Malaysia as well.

He made the Buddhist single episode television serial Sitha Niwana Katha which telecast on Rupavahini in every Poya Day which was started by an idea of Somaweera Senanayake. It was started on 2002 and continuously aired for 19 consecutive years. In 2017, he was appointed as the director of Rupavahini's various programs.

In 2008, he made his maiden cinema direction by making romantic drama film Nil Diya Yahana starring Saranga Disasekara and Chathurika Peiris in lead roles. With the film, Dayaratne became the only director to make a film while working in Rupavahini. Later, he was appointed as the Director of the Film Training Institute where he worked three while attached to the Rupavahini. He retired from Rupavahini in 2019 after more than 35 years of service.

In 2018, his "Shalika Ru Sri" launches a lot of TV commercials and movie documentaries. In 2019, he directed two teleplays – Kele Handa and Oana. Nimal Undugoda co-produced the teledrama Kele Handa with Rupavahini. Serial Oana was produced by Samudra Hikkaduwa and Srinath de Silva.

== Directed television serials ==
Year	Film	Ref.
1992	Mahamera Pamula	
2000	Dekethi Muwahatha	
2002–present	Sitha Niwana Katha	
2003	Bogala Sawundiris	
	Eha Iwura	
	Dolosmahe Api	
2019	Kele Handa	
2019	Oana	
2015	Madara Suwanda	

== Filmography ==
Year	Film	Role	Ref.
1976	Madol Duwa	child artist	
1978	Gehenu Lamai	Assistant make-up artist	
1978	Veera Puran Appu	Assistant make-up artist	
1980	Adara Charika	Assistant director	
1981	Thavalama	Assistant make-up artist	
1983	Mahagedara	Assistant director	
1983	Manik Maliga	Assistant director	
1994	Ahas Maliga	Assistant director	
1984	Lokke	Assistant director	
1985	Manmulawel	Assistant director	
1985	Wathsala Akka	Assistant director	
1985	Du Daruwo	Assistant director	
2008	Nil Diya Yahana	Director	

== Accolades ==
=== Youth Services Council ===
Year	Nominee / work	Award	Result
1975		Best Costume Designer	Won

=== Sumathi Awards ===
Year	Nominee / work	Award	Result
2001	Dakathi Muwahatha	Jury Award	Won
2012	Sitha Niwana Katha	Jury Award	Won

=== Raigam Tele'es ===
Year	Nominee / work	Award	Result
2016	Sitha Niwana Katha – Karumakkarayo	Best Single Episode Drama	Won

=== Janabhimani Honorary Awards ===
Year	Nominee / work	Award	Result
2018	Contribution towards drama	Janabhimani Award	Won
