= Saddha (given name) =

Saddha is a given name. Notable people with the name include:

- Saddha Mangala Sooriyabandara (born 1968), Sri Lankan journalist
- Saddha Tissa of Anuradhapura, king of Anuradhapura
