= Lionel Algama =

Sri Lankan musician (1935–2008)

- ලයනල් අල්ගම
- Born: Algama Koralalage Lionel Kumaradasa Perera; 24 March 1935; Gampaha, Sri Lanka
- Died: 18 May 2008 (aged 73); Colombo, Sri Lanka
- Education: Veyangoda Central College
- Occupations: Musician, playback singer
- Spouse: Sheila Olga Patricia Perera
- Children: 3
- Awards: Best Music Director
- Musical career
- Genres: Pop; soul; Hindustani classical music; Indian classical music
- Instruments: Vocals, Sitar, Sri Veena
- Years active: 1955–2005
- Labels: Columbia; His Master's Voice

Algama Koralalage Lionel Kumaradasa Perera (24 March 1935 – 18 May 2008 Sinhala: ලයනල් අල්ගම), popularly known as Lionel Algama was a Sri Lankan singer, composer and a musician. Considered one of the most respected musicians in Sinhala song, Algama is most notable for the invention of a musical instrument known as ‘Sri Veena’.

== Personal life ==
Algama was born on 24 March 1935 in Brandiamulla, Gampaha, Sri Lanka. His father Jinadasa Perera, was a rich landowner in Kurunegala who ran a trading business. He first went to school at Brandiamulla Church in Gampaha and then studied at Veyangoda Central College.

Lionel's grandfather worked as the manager of the Kahatagaha mine owned by Sir John Kotelawala. From then on they chose Banduragoda, Kurunegala for their residence. Near the time of his grandfather's death, they returned to their home in Gampaha. During this time, Lionel's father and uncle started a drama company called Theater Club and set out to stage two plays, "Honda Kala" and "Vana Pushpaya".

He was married in 1963 to Sheila Olga Patricia Perera, a resident of Gampaha. The two were nieces and nephews. Sheela learned dance from the Chithrasena Academy and sang children's songs. The couple had one son: Sajeevananda, and two daughters: Yasasi Madhara and Anuradha. Sheila and her eldest daughter Yasasi starred in the popular commercial of Rexona Soap. Sheila died of a heart attack on 13 January 2019.

He died on 18 May 2008 at the age 73. The funeral was held on 21 May 2008.

== Career ==
His first music teacher was T. N. Silva. While still in school, he learned to play the sitar from veteran musician Edwin Samaradiwakara. Although his main instrument is the sitar, he excels at playing musical instruments such as veena, guitar, sarod, harmonium, and mandolin. Seeing his son's innate talent for music, his father sent Lionel to the Visva-Bharati University of Music, India in 1955. During his life in India, he studied sitar under the maestro Ravi Shankar and Rabindranath Tagore. He was fluent in English, Vanga and Hindi languages. He learned Hindi from Ven. Daramitipola Rathanasara Thero. Between the years 1955 to 1959, he performed classical and jazz concerts and Ballets in New Delhi, Calcutta, Bombay, Benares, Jaipur and Pakistan.

After returning Sri Lanka, he joined with fellow musician W. Chularatna. Under the guidance of Chularatna and Samaradiwakara, he joined the Band of Radio Ceylon. While a resident of the Chithrasena Art Institute in Kollupitiya, he co-wrote the music with W. D. Amaradeva for Chithrasena's stage plays such as Karadiya and Nala Damayanthi. Meanwhile, he also directed music for the plays Kinkini Kolama, Gini Hora, Ran Kikili, Nuwanpodiya, Kusa Pabawathi, Macbeth and Othello. From 1959 to 1989, as his first teaching appointment, he worked as the music teacher of Thurstan College, Colombo. In 1963, he performed at Perth and Tasmania in Australia with the Chitrasena Ballet troupe, Broadcasting and T.V. Singapore.

In 1964, Lionel made his maiden cinema music direction with the film Patachara directed by Wimalanath Dissanayake. His music direction in the film was highly praised by the audience, particularly with the songs "Thanha Asha" sung by Amaradeva and song "Baloli Loli" sung by Nanda Malini. Later he won the award for the Best Music Director in 1964 at the United Ceylon Fans Association Awards in 1965. The climax of him film music came through the blockbuster film Parasatu Mal. Released in 1966, the three songs are like precious pearls in the history of Sinhala film music: "Sandakath Pini Diya", "Ada Pamanai Ithiiri" (by Amaradeva), "Parawunu Malwala" (by Sujatha Aththanayaka). Along with Dayananda Gunawardena, he staged popular play Nari Bena on 4 November 1960 at Thurston College Hall. It was able to take Sri Lankan drama music in a new direction where Algama tried to experiment with unique musical compositions with the lyrics of Raigama Raban. But in 44 years he has composed 9 films.

Apart from cinema, Lionel also composed several school anthems for Bandaranayake College, Gampaha, Ratnawali Girls' College and Thurstan College. In 1975, he was appointed as a Cultural Development Officer in the Ministry of Cultural Affairs. He also became the chief Examiner of Music, in both theory and practical at the Faculty of Aesthetic Education, University of Kelaniya and later served as a supervisor in music, Ministry of Education in the Republic of Maldives from 1983 to 1984. Then he designed the North Indian Classical music syllabus for the Institute of Asian Culture, University of Windsor, Canada. Between 1979 and 1980, Lionel performed for BBC London, ITV London, Manchester, Birmingham Camden Centre London, WCI, Commonwealth Institute of London, Bharathiya Vidya Bhawan (UK Centre) Institute of Indian Culture London. Then he toured all the Scandinavian countries for musical recitals and concerts.

After 18 dedicated years, he made the musical instrument called 'Soothar' in 1979. It was inaugurated at the John de Silva Memorial Theater. Rita Ganguly, a contemporary of Visva-Bharati, along with Bengali musician Subhash Chandra, participated in a drama conference at the Tower Hall Theater Foundation in 1981. Under their advice, he renamed the instrument as “Sree Veena”. He was also awarded a doctorate for his dissertation. He wrote two theses for his doctorate: Teaching of Music and Development of the Chordophones in East and West in the years 1978 and in 1979 respectively. The final perfected product of the "Sree Veena" was completed in 1994.

In 1995, he won the National award for the Best Music Directions and Creations. On 7 January 1996, a solo concert at Elphinstone Theatre, Maradana was held where he performed his new instrument “Sree Veena”. In addition, he composed the melody for the song "Sambudu Himige Sadaham Sisilen", the Dhamma school anthem sung by children in Sri Lanka today. Among the teledramas he directed music are Sasara, Mihikathage Daruwo, Ran Masu Uyana and Imadiyamankada. Later in 2000, he won the Sumathi Award for Best Teledrama Music Director for the teledrama Imadiyamankada at the 2000 Sumathi Awards.

== Filmography ==
Year	Film	Roles	Ref.
1964	Patachara	Composer	
1966	Parasathu Mal	Composer	
1967	Vasanthi	Composer	
1968	Indunila	Composer, Playback Singer	
1976	Pradeepe Ma Wewa	Composer	
1980	Anuhasa	Composer	
1980	Miyurige Kathawa	Composer	
1981	Bandura Mal	Composer	
1982	Bambara Geethaya	Composer	
