= Sumathi Jury Awards =

The Sumathi Jury Special Award is presented annually in Sri Lanka by the Sumathi Group of Campany associated with many commercial brands to uplift the talent of Sri Lankan artists of all genre who provided their enormous contribution to the television screen. The award is given by the vote of the Jury panel, which consists of 5 to 6 senior artists.

The award was first given in 2000. Following is a list of the winners of this prestigious title since then.

Year	Award winner	Teledrama / Program
2000	Wimalaratne Adhikari	Gajaman Nona
2000	Parakrama Niriella	Sudo Sudu
2001	Jayantha Chandrasiri	Rajina
2001	Dayaratne Ratagedara	Dakathi Muwahath
2001	Lenin Indika	Kathura
2002	Jackson Anthony	Maha Sinhale Wansha Kathawa history program
2003	Hasantha Hettiarachchi	Doramadalawa educational program
2003	Gaminda Priyaviraj	Api Nodanna Live comedy program
2003	Jackson Anthony	Neighbour's Talk political program
2004	Bandula Padmakumara	Mul Pituwa news program
2006	Rosmand Senaratne	Tsunami Vipatha Poya Program
2006	Sunil Rathnayake	Bhavathra
2006	Chamuditha Samarawickrama	Dharma Pradeepa Buddhist program
2006	Jackson Anthony	Ganga Dige adventure program
2007	Vinoja Nilanthi	Doovili Suwanda
2007	Chandani Seneviratne	Sulan Seenu
2007	Cyril Dharmawardena	Katu Imbula
2007	Srimal Wedisinghe	Mage Kaviya Mata Denna
2007	Wasantha Kumarasiri	Ashawari
2007	Rodney Warnakula	Haya Wani Patumaga
2008	Lakmini Amaradeva	Rasthiyadukaraya
2008	Pradeep Senanayake	Sudheera
2008	Meena Kumari	Veeduru Mal
2008	Thisari Wathsala	Tikiri Saha Ungi
2008	Chandika Nanayakkara	Vesak Sanda Ra
2009	B.A.C Abeywardena	Suwa Sampatha program
2009	Ruwan Gunaratne	Hathara Wani Thattuwa
2009	Shehan Baranage	360 political program
2010	Hema Nalin Karunaratne	-
2010	Ranjith Edirisinghe	Bharathe Gee Windana musical program
2010	Jayalath Jayawardena	Health Program
2010	Lalith de Silva	Puwath Samalochanaya
2010	Devinda Kongahage	Sadisi Tharanaya
2011	Anurudda Jaaysinghe	Maya Roo program
2011	Lucky Dias	Obada Lakshaypathi Mamada Lakshayapthi quiz program
2011	Chamara Janaraj Peiris	Ayal
2011	Ravindra Randeniya	Mind Star quiz program
2012	Ranjeewani Baddewithana	Pateebha religious program
2012	Dayaratne Ratagedara	Sitha Niwana Katha
2012	Rajeev Ananda	Kadadora
2013	Rev. Daranagama Kusala Dhamma Thero	Bosath Sirith program
2013	Dunston de Silva	Sunhinda musical program
2013	Udaya Kumara Thennakoon	-
2013	Chanchala Bulathwatta	-
2013	Jayanath Gunawardena	Ranmuthu Artane Supipi Ran Piyuma
2014	Volga Kalpani	-
2014	Vinoja Nilanthi	-
2014	Dilani Lakmali	-
2014	Richard Abeywickrama	-
2015	Shraddha TV	For religious programs
2015	Channa Perera	Rathu Ahasa
2015	Palitha Senarath Yapa	For service to sports sector
2016	Sarath Kothalawala; Kumara Thirimadura	Grahambell Wath Sithuwada
2016	Pradeep Dharmadasa	Sikka director
2016	Lakmini Amaradeva	Wibhagaya Fail
2017	Udaya Kumara Tennekoon	Sonduru Aagnawa
2017	Cletus Mendis	Millewa Walawwa teledrama
2017	Sathischandra Edirisinghe	For service to television acting
2017	Ananda Abenayake	For 25 year continuous service to direct Sansare Piyasatahan
2018	Daya Wayaman	Baddata Sanda
2018	Hemasiri Liyanage	Thaththa
2019	Chandana Sooriyabandara	Sirasa Lakshyapathi
2019	Rasika Suraweera Arachchi	Scripts, Lyrics and Producing most number of teledramas
2020	Charith Abeysinghe	Multiple roles as actor, singer, direction and camera direction
2020	Shermila Dharmarasa	News scripts and directions of social services
2020	Nethalie Nanayakkara	Roles in Giridevi and Sathya
2021	Asanka Sayakkara	Scripts of Internasanal and Pork Veediya
2021	Supun Rathnayake	Script and direction of Black Town Stories
2021	Sujeewa Priyal	Internasanal
2022	Chavan Daniels	Gammadda program
2023	Supun Rathnayake	Scripts and directions
