= Nadagamkarayo =

Sri Lankan comedy-drama TV series

- Title card (opening intro of the nadagamkarayo)
- ෴නාඩගම්කාරයෝ෴
- Genre: Comedy drama Thriller Romantic
- Created by: Saddha Mangala Sooriyabandara
- Developed by: Maathraa Productions
- Directed by: Jayaprakash Shivagurunathan
- Starring: Sajitha Anuththara; Prasannajith Abeysuriya; Giriraj Kaushalya; Senali Fonseka; Kokila Pawan Jayasooriya; Rahal Bulathsinhala; Sangeeth Prabhu
- Voices of: Sajitha Anuththara
- Narrated by: Athula Mahawalage
- Theme music composer: Bandara Eheliyagoda
- Opening theme: "Meka Nadagm Maduwak" by Sajitha Anuththara
- Composer: Dinesh Dissanayake
- Country of origin: Sri Lanka
- Original language: Sinhala
- No. of seasons: 1
- No. of episodes: 400

Production
- Executive producer: Chamara Samarawickrama
- Production location: Kirindiwela as Karanduthanna Village (location in Teledrama)
- Cinematography: Prabath Darshana
- Editor: Thivanka Udagedara
- Running time: 20 minutes

Original release
- Network: Swarnavahini
- Release: 18 January 2021 – 2 August 2022

Related
- Kolam Kuttama (spin-off)

Nadagamkarayo (Sinhala: නාඩගම්කාරයෝ) is a 2021 Sri Lankan comedy thriller romantic television series broadcast on Swarnavahini TV. It is directed by Jayaprakash Sivagurunathan, produced by Chamara Samarawickrama and written by Saddha Mangala Sooriyabandara. It aired every weekday from 9:30 pm to 10:00 pm onwards. It was broadcast from 18 January 2021 to 2 August 2022. It has received positive reviews from critics, with praise for the screenplay and performances, and rated as one of the most popular teledramas in Sri Lanka. A spin-off series Kolam Kuttama directed by Sivagurunathan and written by Sooriyabandara was started on 3 August 2022.

== Summary ==
Saraa and his rowdy gang join the village drama team despite their arrogant attitudes, and the rest of the villagers get annoyed especially Kukula Merchant and Mr. Secretary when the headmaster and Loku Hamuduruwo start to defend their unacceptable behavior. Despite all these, Saraa falls in love with Patali aka Sudu Chuti (master's elder daughter.)

== Cast and characters ==
=== Main cast ===
- Sajitha Anuththara as Sarath Gunaratne aka Saraa
- Prasannajith Abeysuriya as Ariyapala Rooparathna Master
- Giriraj Kaushalya as Kusumsiri Cabral aka Kukula Lakuna Mudalali
- Senali Fonseka as Patali aka Sudu Chooti, Master's elder daughter
- Kokila Pawan Jayasooriya as Nuwan Madushanka aka Marlon de Silva
- Rahal Bulathsinhala as Loku Hamuduruwo
- Sangeeth Prabhu as Sudath Sanjeewa aka Kawadiya, Saraa's right-hand-man and best friend

=== Supporting cast ===
- Dharmapriya Dias as Bindusiri Cabral, Kukula lakuna's brother
- Madushany Perera as Janaki Ameesha Cabral aka Jaanu
- Ravishka Dilshan Muthukumarana as police officer at episode 397
- Pasindu Vithanage as Kiri Putha, Saraa's friend
- Viraj as Sudda, Sarah's friend
- Kasuni Kavindi as Rasika Gunaratne, Saraa's elder sister
- Hashinika Karaliyadda as Sōma, Kukula Lakuna Mudalali's Wife
- Meena Kumari as Kusumalatha, Master's Wife
- Nimmy Manohari as Anjali "Poddi", Master's younger daughter
- Ruwan Perera as Kekulandara
- Dayasiri Hettiarachchi as Mudalali
- Upatissa Balasuriya as S. K. Sirisena
- Praveena Dissanayake as Geethika, Kawadiya's love interest
- Sharad Chanduma as Rathne

=== Minor cast ===
- Sashmitha Dilshan as Gajaman
- Ananda Athukorale as Police officer
- Ranjan Suriyakumara as Police officer
- Ravishka Dilshan Muthukumarana as police officer at episode 397
- Piyal Sylvester as Lekam
- Dulanja Dilshan as Nanda Sirimalwatta, the Provincial Councilor
- Sachintha Randeepa as Podi Hamuduruwo
- Nipuni Poojitha as Geethani miss, the development officer
- Manuja Jayakody as Thiyogabadu
- Wasana Bandara as Suranga
- Rupa Pathirana as Saraa's mother
- Geethal Perera as Gunaratne, Sara's father
- Amandya Uthpali as Kalpana
- Buddhika Namal
- Sujeeva Wijetunga
- Salika Rukshan
- Raveen Ranmalith as Chutte
- Cheruka Weerakoon as Himself
- Pasindu Sampath as Layya
- Dulan Hettiarachchi as Podi Mudiyanse
- Devinda Wickramasinghe as Jayantha, Rasika's disabled husband
- Vihanga Malsara
- Subodha Buddhipriya
- Swaranjana Dissanayake
- Supun Thathsara
- Shayani Bhagya
- Asiri Edirisinghe as Nadagam student
- Madara Sewwandi as Hansi
- Rehan Senadheera as Ananda
- Rishshan Pathirana
- Madushan Nanayakkara as Minister Suren Rajanayake
- Sampath Dadallage as Minister's MSD security

== Reception ==
The series stars Sajitha Anuththara Anthony and Senali Fonseka in lead roles with an ensemble cast of Sangeeth Prabhu, Kokila Pawan, Prasannajith Abesuriya, Rahal Bulathsinhala, and Giriraj Kaushalya. The series has received acclaim from critics and audiences alike, and all the telecast episodes were trending on YouTube, setting a record in Sri Lankan teledrama history. At the 2021 Sumathi Awards, the teledrama received awards for Popular Actor (Sajitha) and Popular Actress (Senali).

Upon release, It has received acclaim from critics and audiences alike, with particular praise for the screenplay and performances of the cast. It is one of the most-watched and successful teledramas in Sri Lanka. However the 400th and final episode of the serial received negative reviews from critics and fans where some people accuse it of leaving the audience confused towards the end. Some viewers who loved the serial said that it drowned out the characters of some of the actors and actresses who acted in the teledrama with a dead end.

In February 2021, the drama team announced that that lead cast, Sajitha Anuththara, Sangeeth Prabhu and Kokila Pawan, had been infected with COVID-19. As a result, the serial has suspended shooting for a brief period.

Actor Ruwan Perera received death threats in July 2021 after the show depicted Sara (Sajitha Anthony) being hospitalized after being hit by Kekulandara (Perera) with a machete was broadcast. Sajitha Anthony, who plays Sara, has released a video on social media saying that do not overly sensitive to the serial and its characters in reality.

== Awards ==
=== Sumathi Awards ===
Year	Nominee / work	Award	Result
2021	Sajitha Anuththara	Most Popular Teledrama Actor	Won
2021	Senali Fonseka	Most Popular Teledrama Actress	Won

=== SLIM-Kantar Peoples Awards ===
Year	Nominee / work	Award	Result
2022	Sajitha Anuththara	Most Popular Teledrama Actor	Won
2022	Nadagamkarayo	Most Popular Teledrama	Won

=== Raigam Tele'es ===
Year	Nominee / work	Award	Result
2022	Nadagamkarayo	Janagatha Teledrama Award	Won

== Soundtrack ==
Song	Singer	Lyrics	Music	Length
"Meka Nadagam Maduwak"	Sajitha Anuththara	Bandara Eheliyagoda	Dinesh Dissanayake	2:50
