= Kolam Kuttama =

Sri Lankan mystery-drama TV series

- Title card
- ෴කෝලම් කුට්ටම෴
- Genre: Mystery; Thriller Romantic
- Created by: Saddha Mangala Sooriyabandara
- Developed by: IMPAS Productions
- Directed by: Jayaprakash Shivagurunathan
- Starring: Nalin Pradeep Udawela; Sampath Jayaweera; Chameera Liyanage; Kavindya Dulshani; Nirosha Thalagala; Anuradha Edirisinghe; Nino Araliya
- Theme music composer: Induwara Sooriyabandara
- Opening theme: Athula Mahawalage
- Composer: Induwara Sooriyabandara
- Country of origin: Sri Lanka
- Original language: Sinhala
- No. of seasons: 1
- No. of episodes: 400

Production
- Executive producers: Chethani Wijetunga; Sri Lal Wickramage
- Production location: Villages around Madu Ganga
- Cinematography: Prabath Darshana
- Editor: Thivanka Udagedara
- Running time: 20 minutes

Original release
- Network: Swarnavahini
- Release: 3 August 2022 – present

Related
- Nadagamkarayo

Kolam Kuttama (Sinhala: කෝලම් කුට්ටම), is a 2022 Sri Lankan mystery-drama thriller television series broadcast on Swarnavahini TV. It is directed by Jayaprakash Sivagurunathan, co-produced by Chethani Wijetunga, Sri Lal Wickramage and written by Saddha Mangala Sooriyabandara. It aired every weekday from 9:30 pm to 10:00 pm onwards. It is broadcast from 3 August 2022 as the spin-off series of popular television serial Nadagamkarayo.

== Plot ==
The series based on the traditional masks and puppetry in Ambalangoda area, and was created based on a master puppeteer and a mask-cutting artist and two mysterious outsiders. The serials started with the end credits of Nadagamkarayo where the Kolam Kuttama dance troupe wins in the doubtful manner against Ruparathna master's Nadagamkarayo troupe.

== Cast and characters ==
=== Main cast ===
- Nalin Pradeep Udawela as Sumanapala Gurunnanse
- Sampath Jayaweera as Dolapihilla 'Dole' mahaththaya
- Chameera Liyanage as Senal
- Kavindya Dulshani as Minimuthu aka Suddi (retired)
- Anuradha Edirisinghe as Hiruni

=== Supporting cast ===
- Rahal Bulathsinhala as Loku Hamuduruwo
- Theekshana Sri Wijesinghe as Jina
- Mali Jayaweerage as Hichchi nona
- Mauli Ferdinando as Chuta
- Sarath Kulanga as Sirimanne, music master
- Nirosha Thalagala as Sabeetha
- Nino Araliya as Ranmuthu, Bhagya's love interest, Suddi's brother
- Sujani Maduwanthi as Bhagya
- Nilmini Kottegoda as Latha, Master's wife
- Sisira Thadikara as Gunapala Gurunnanse

=== Minor cast ===
- Anton Cooray as School teacher
- Chaminda Batukotuwa as Hokandara
- Mayura Kanchana as Sena, Sabeetha's husband
- Nimal Jayasinghe
- Thilan Warnajith
- Manoj Yalegama as Eethipala, the boatman
- Madushan Hathlahawaththa
- Duminda Sandaruwan
- Gandara Thurya Sanka as Hinni mahaththaya
- Viraj Perera as Prasanjana
- Wathsala Diyalagoda as Prasanjana's fiancee
- Maleesha Dakshina
- Bhanuka Senadeera
- Adithya Anuradanayake
- Viraj Silva
- Mithun Thilakaratne
- Sajith Siyambalagoda
- Thilini Kaushalya
- Varushani Rajathewa
- Genisha Dilrukshi
- Sanduni Kaushalya
- Devindi Kanchana
- Dilini Weerasinghe
- Sayuri Dissanayake
- Raneesha Pathirana
- Hiruni Dayaratne
- Yashara Bandara
- Keshi Rajapaksa
- Anjali Jayasinghe
- Sithara Kulatunga
- Chathura Sooriyabandara as Jayathilaka
- Mesandu Sooriyabandara as Mesandu
