= Nil Diya Yahana =

Nil Diya Yahana නිල් දිය යහන
- Directed by: Dayaratne Ratagedara
- Written by: Dileepa Jayakody
- Produced by: Hemlock Investments
- Starring: Saranga Disasekara; Chathurika Pieris; Tony Ranasinghe
- Cinematography: Donald Karunaratna
- Edited by: Ravindra Guruge
- Music by: Rohana Weerasinghe
- Distributed by: CEL Theaters
- Release date: 18 December 2008
- Country: Sri Lanka
- Language: Sinhala

Nil Diya Yahana (Sinhala: නිල් දිය යහන) is a 2008 Sri Lankan Sinhala drama film directed by Dayaratne Ratagedara and co-produced by Mali Hettiarachchi and Sujeewa Priyashantha for Hemlock Investments. It stars Saranga Disasekara in debut cinema acting with Chathurika Pieris in lead roles along with Tony Ranasinghe and Chandani Seneviratne. Music composed by Rohana Weerasinghe. It is the 1117th Sri Lankan film in the Sinhala cinema.

Shooting of the film was completed in and around Colombo, Dambulla and Nuwara Eliya. Dileepa Jayakody marked his entrance as the script writer.

== Plot ==
The story revolves around a young couple Shanuka and Shehara. Shehara is a daughter of a rich corrupt businessman whereas Shanuka is the son of an honest journalist Mauyadunne. Mayadunne writes many articles against Shehara's father. Despite, the rivalry between the two fathers, Shehara and Shanuka who attend the same science tuition decides to date each other. Shehara is able to hide this from her parents until one day she is seen with Shehara's brother. Shehara's dad find out and threatens to kill Shanuka's dad if Shanuka continues this relationship. Hence, Shehara and Shanuka stop physically meeting. However, they keep the relationship striving with the help of web messaging. The relationship leads to an ominous turn upon discovery.

== Cast ==
- Saranga Disasekara as Shanuka Mayadunne
- Chathurika Peiris as Shehara Jayawardena
- Tony Ranasinghe as Jayawardena, Shehara's father
- Chandani Seneviratne as Asha, Shehara's mother
- Sanath Gunathilake as Minister
- Wilson Karunaratne as Shehara's Father's main goon
- Damayanthi Fonseka as Shanuka's elder sister
- Roshan Pilapitiya as Shehara's brother
- Manike Attanayake as Shanuka's mother
- Daya Alwis
- Dilan Perera as Tuition techer
- Manjula Moragaha as Danushka
- Dasun Pathirana as a student in the tuition class

== Soundtrack ==
No.	Title	Singer(s)	Length
1.	"Sasara Vilai"	Akalanka Serasinghe, Chatra Serasinghe, Suranji Shyamali
2.	"Sundarai Kodewwama"	Iman Perera, Uresha Ravihari
