= Sumathi Best Television Investigative Reporting Award =

The Sumathi Best Television Investigative Reporting Award is presented annually in Sri Lanka by the Sumathi Group of Campany associated with many commercial brands for the best Sri Lankan investigative reporting of the year in television screen.

The award was first given in 2011, with the influence of Civil War investigations taken place at the battle front in 2009. The award is given to the best two investigative reporting television channel. Following is a list of the winners of this prestigious title since then.

== Awards ==
Year	Place	TV channel
2011	1st place	Sri Lanka Rupavahini Corporation
2011	2nd place	Independent Television Network
2012	1st place	Sri Lanka Rupavahini Corporation
2012	2nd place	Independent Television Network
2013	1st place	Sri Lanka Rupavahini Corporation
2013	2nd place	Independent Television Network
2014	1st place	Swarnavahini
2015	1st place	TV Derana
2015	2nd place	Sri Lanka Rupavahini Corporation
2016	1st place - Seya Sadewmi murder	TV Derana
2016	2nd - Maha Oyya Kiri Govi Getaluwa	Swarnavahini
2017	1st place	TV Derana
2017	2nd place	Swarnavahini
2018	1st place - Hiru TV News	Sudewa Hettiarachchi
2018	2nd place - Ukussa Death of Dala Puttuwa	TV Derana
2019	1st place - Ukussa	TV Derana
2019	2nd place	Sirasa TV
2021	1st place - Ukussa	TV Derana
2021	2nd place - Nittewan Gena Janapravada	Swarnavahini
