= Sumathi Best Television Magazine Program Award =

The Sumathi Best Television Magazine Program Award is presented annually in Sri Lanka by the Sumathi Group for the best Sri Lankan television magazine program.

The award was first given in 2002. Following is a list of the winners since then.

== Awards ==
| Year | Magazine Program | Program crew | Ref. |
|---|---|---|---|
| 2002 | 2002 Dark Room | Sirasa TV | |
| 2003 | Kamatha | Chandana Suriyabandara | |
| 2004 | Siththampana | Sampath Sri Jayasinghe | |
| 2006 | Gajamatics | Dhammika Fonseka | |
| 2007 | Doramadalawa | Hasantha Hettiarachchi | |
| 2007 | Dutu Nudutu | Hema Nalin Karunaratne | |
| 2008 | Salan Hanthe | Jackson Anthony | |
| 2009 | - | - | |
| 2010 | Soora Goviya | Chaminda Arambegedara | |
| 2011 | Prathi Ruu | Ranjeewani Baddewithana | |
| 2012 | Wenasa | Ruwanthika Ranathunga; Anjana Jayathunga; Manjula Athugala; Thimila Weerahandi | |
| 2013 | Wenasa | Ruwanthika Ranathunga; Anjana Jayathunga; Manjula Athugala; Thimila Weerahandi | |
| 2014 | Aruma Puduma Roda Hathara | Namal Suriyabandara; Chandana Seneviratne | |
| 2015 | The Other Side | K.C Saranga | |
| 2016 | Arty | R.A. Dushanhta Dharshana | |
| 2017 | Aruma Puduma Roda Hathara | Namal Suriyabandara; Chandana Seneviratne | |
| 2018 | Arty | Oshadha Priyankara | |
| 2019 | Ulpatha | Chandima Priyanthi Premaratne | |
| 2021 | Now Showing | Inoka Premawardhana | |
