= Sumathi Best Television Presenter Award =

The Sumathi Best Television Presenter Award is presented annually in Sri Lanka by the Sumathi Group of Campany associated with many commercial brands for the best Sri Lankan presenter of the year in television screen.

The award was initially presented in 2002 under the title of Best Announcer. In 2009, the award was split into two categories: Best Announcer and Best Presenter. Below is a list of the recipients of this prestigious title since then.

== Awards ==
Year	Best Presenter	TV channel	Ref.
2009	Dinusha Rajapathirana	Swarnavahini	
2010	Alhasa Sereeb	-	
2011	Nadeeka Karunanayake	Swarnavahini	
2012	Indrasiri Suraweera	Independent Television Network	
2013	Sanjeewa Edirimanna	Independent Television Network	
2014	Vajira Jayawardena	Sri Lanka Rupavahini Corporation	
2015	Sithara Kaluarchchi	Independent Television Network	
2016	Wasanthi Nanayakkara	Swarnavahini	
2017	Lakmali Welagedara	Sri Lanka Rupavahini Corporation	
2018	Kelum Srimal	TV Derana	
2019	Sithara Kaluarchchi	Independent Television Network	
2021	Wathsala Samarakoon	Sri Lanka Rupavahini Corporation	
