= Sumathi Best Television Musical Program Award =

The Sumathi Best Television Musical Program Award is presented annually in Sri Lanka by the Sumathi Group for the best Sri Lankan television musical program.

The award was first given in 1995. Following is a list of the winners since then.

Year	Musical Program	Director	Ref.
1995	Ananda Rathriya	Hema Nalin Karunaratne	
1996	Manohari	Ravindra Munasinghe	
1997	Cinama Atheethawalokanaya	Ravindra Munasinghe	
1998	Miyurusara Wasanthaya	Upali Ariyasiri	
1999	Miyurusara Wasanthaya	Upali Ariyasiri	
2000	Nadun Uyana	Ravindra Munasinghe	
2001	Seegiri Gee Siri	Ravindra Munasinghe	
2002	Nimthera	Sandaruwan Jayawickrama	
2003	Bakmaha Gee Asiriya	Sumith Dissanayake	
2004	Saadhu Naada	Kelum Palitha Maheerathna	
2006	Rathu Kandulu Geethaya	Sumith Dissanayake	
2007	Alakamandawa	Vinitha Karunaratne	
2008	Suramya Rathriya	Mahesh Nissanka; Ravi Abeywickrama	
2009	Taala	Ranga Premaratne	
2010	Saadhu Naadha	Amila Nuwan Waadasinghe	
2011	Saki Sanda	Hema Nalin Karunaratne	
2012	Sanhinda	Udaya Kumara Tennakoon	
2013	Aalakamandawa - Hela Gee Rajina Latha	Vinitha Karunaratne	
2014	Thunhelaye Mangallaya	Mahesh Nissanka	
2015	Rajatha Sara - Hemapala Perera	A. Darshana	
2016	Feeling the Youth	Sri Lanka Rupavahini Corporation	
2017	Sihinayaki Ra	Mahesh Nishshanka	
2018	Rajagedara Nadagama	Kumudu Abeydheera	
2019	Tone Poem	Ranga Premaratne	
2021	Acoustic Unlimited	Janajeewa Wehella	
