= Raigam Tele'es Jury Awards =

The Raigam Tele'es Jury Awards are presented annually in Sri Lanka by the Kingdom of Raigam associated with many commercial brands to uplift the talent of Sri Lankan actors and actresses, as well as technical crew who gained positive reviews from critics for their role in television screen.

The award was first given in 2005. The following is a list of the winners of these awards since then.

== Award and certificate winners ==
Year	Award winner	Teledrama / Program
2004		
2005		
2006	Anura Madhawa Jayasekara	
2006	Palitha Silva	
2006	Navaratne Gamage	
2006	Santhusa Liyanage	
2006	Manjula Kumari	
2007	Sujani Menaka	role in Sansare Piya Satahan
2007	Lakshman Wijesekara	role in Tikiri Saha Ungi
2007	Chinthaka Somakeerthi	camera in lighting of Rasthiyadu Karaya
2008		
2009	Dakshika Kulatunga	Role Saara in Oba Kauda
2009	Sasanka Amaraweera	animation and effects of Ishuru Bhavana
2009	Shanudrie Priyasad	Role Ruwani in Kadadasi Mal
2009	Nadee Chandrasekara	Role Ukku in Ridee Ittankaraya
2009	Vipula Vithana Gamage	Role Hethuhami in Mahogaya
2009	Wilman Sirimanne	Role Gamini in Isuru Bhavana
2009	Jayantha Ranawaka	Make-up of Therani Geethaya
2009	Mauli Fernando	Role Chandraratne of Arungal
2010		
2011	Chamila Aththanayake	Sanakeliyay Maya
2011	Uddika Premarathna	Roles in Kap Suwahas Kal, Swayanjatha and Bonda Meedum
2011	Anura Bandara Rajaguru	Roles in Swayanjatha, Korale Mahaththaya and Maranayak
2011	Pransi Tehara	Awurudu Diyaniya
2011	Thishuna Perera	Swayanjatha
2012	Sachin Chathuranga	Role Podi Ukkuwa in Dhawala Kadulla
2012	Heshani Ruwandika	Role Lisa in Dooli Pintharu
2012	C. Kuruppu	Sri Lanka Parliament documentary on ITN
2012	Ranjeewani Baddevithana	Sandun Aratu program on TV Derana
2012	Ananda Kumara	Role Thaththa in Me Wasantha Kalayay
2012	Mihira Sirithilaka	Role Andiris Nilame in Monarathenna
2012	Kris Haris	Role Belek Aththo in Dhawala Kadulla
2012	Salecine Company	Production of Akuru Tharaha Na teledrama
2013	Esha Perera	-
2013	Osanka Dilruwan	
2013	Kavya Sandamini	
2013	Amitha Danangoda	
2013		Gammedda program
2013	TV Derana	Ada Derana News
2014	Kokila Pawan	Sasara Sarani
2014	Abhishek Zoysa / Minoli Balasuriya	Wara Malee
2014	Santhusa Liyanage and crew	Making of Bhawa Theertha teledrama
2014	Tharushi Perera	Handapanagala
2014	Dilini Lakmali	Pura Kalani
2014	Sandaruwan Tillakaratne and crew	Production of Uththareethara program
2014	Shalani Tharaka	Punchi Walawwa
2014	Senuri Wakishta	Chess
2015	Madhuka Wijeratne	Degal Doruwa Kalagaraya program
2015	Nadeeka Wijeweera	Interview with Abdul Kalam
2015	Chathura Alwis	Travel with Chathura program
2015	Nilmini Tennakoon	Role Amma of Amma
2016	Saheli Sadithma	Thaara
2016	Dinuli Jayoda	Golu Thaththa
2016	Eshara Bhashitha	Golu Thaththa
2016	Subhashini Balasubramanium	Thaara
2016	Pradeep Wijekoon	Wide Colombo program of Shraddha TV
2016	Damith Nishan & Rumesh Akila	Hiru Sihina Reyak program
2017	Vihanga Nadith Thathsilu	Bonchi Gedara Indrajala teledrama
2017	Yenulya Danthanarayana	Praana teledrama
2017	Kundalakeshi Wanniarachchi	Jeewithe Soya Yanna teledrama
2017	W. Nuwan Chathuranga	Bandanagara Rohale Akramikatha program
2017	Madhushanka Iroshan	Dalada Malige Ulpanne Chaarithra program
2017	Sandya Withanawasam	Bawumaka Sitagath Gahaniya program
2017	Maureen Charuni	Supahan Sitha - Padama teledrama
2018	Dilka Samanmali	360 political program
2018	Anjana Premartne	Minigan Dala teledrama
2018	Janajeewa Wehalla	Producer, Ethpawura program
2018	Charith Abeysinghe	Minigan Dala teledrama direction
2018	Parakrama Jayasinghe	Koombiyo teledrama
2018	Saddha Mangala Sooriyabandara	Kotipathiyo teledrama song lyrics
2018	Dinesh Dissanayake	Kotipathiyo teledrama music direction
2018	Shyamen Dangamuwa	Kotipathiyo teledrama singing
2018	I.D.A Priyanjan	Production
2018	Parakrama Jayasinghe	Acting
2019	Thilakshani Madhuwanthi	Porakaya program
2019	Sandhya Vithanawasam	Wewak Wage Kathak program
2019	Mandaka Dilpahan	Raavana theme song
2019	Nethalie Nanayakkara	Veeraya Gedara Awith acting
2019	Hirundi Devisiluni	Husma Watena Mal acting
2019	Janu Dolewatte	Ado acting
2019	Heshan Naveen	Sellam Karaththaya acting
2019	Akindu Menuja	Veeraya Gedara Awith acting
2020	not awarded	
2021	Yehansha Rithini	Role "Doni" of Sakarma
2021	Pahandi Walpita	Role "Young Anohami" of Mahapolowa
2021	Onadi Yunethmi	Role "Devmini" of Asanwara Wessa
2022	Aayu Vaidoorya Wanigarathne	Presenter Podi Saadu Tv Programme
2022	Thenuji Vinara Karunarathne	Role "Poddi" of Panamankada
2022	Thuenuki Sanseya	Role "Meenu" of Meenu
2024	Silindu Ranwala	Role "Kiri Noni" of Viyali
2024	Rebecca Dilrukshi	Role "Aseni" of Take Care
2024	Imesh Udayanga	
2024	Hasitha Vandebona	Role "Vikum"
2024	Chamudi Rashmika	Role "little Chandi" of Chandi Kumarihami
2024	Maneesha Sathsara	Role "Saalaya" of Hapannu Api Game Rajje
