= Sumathi Best Television Current Reporting Award =

The Sumathi Best Television Current Reporting Award is presented annually in Sri Lanka by the Sumathi Group of Campany associated with many commercial brands for the best Sri Lankan current news reporting of the year in television screen.

The award was first given in 2011. The award is given to the best two current news reporting television channel. Following is a list of the winners of this prestigious title since then.

Year	Place	TV channel
2011	1st place - Live @ 8	Swarnavahini
2011	2nd place - Ada Derana	TV Derana
2012	1st place - Ada Derana	TV Derana
2012	2nd place - Live @ 8	Swarnavahini
2013	1st place - Ada Derana	TV Derana
2013	2nd place - Live @ 8	Swarnavahini
2014	Ada Derana	TV Derana
2015	1st place - Live @ 8	Swarnavahini
2015	2nd place - Ada Derana	TV Derana
2016	1st place - Hari Puduma Iskole	Independent Television Network
2016	2nd - Uma Oya Nisa Galana Kandulu	Swarnavahini
2017	1st place - Sajith Ranasinghe	Swarnavahini
2017	2nd - Indika Weerakoon	Independent Television Network
2018	1st place - Pahiyangala	TV Derana
2018	2nd - Puvath Satahana	Independent Television Network
2019	1st place - Ada Dawasa	Swarnavahini
2019	2nd - Sanhindiyawe Paalama	Independent Television Network
2021	1st place - Lankawe Bus Nala	Siyatha TV
2021	2nd - Hithakami Mee Masso	Independent Television Network
