= Kolamba Ithaliya =

2021 Sri Lankan teledrama

- Kolamba Ithaliya title card
- කොළඹ ඉතාලිය
- Genre: Comedy drama Thriller Romantic
- Created by: Chalaka Ranasooriya
- Directed by: Jayaprakash Sivagurunathan
- Starring: Sampath Jayaweera; Shanudrie Priyasad; Chanuka Prabuddha; Anuradha Edirisinghe; Gayathri Dias; Rohan Wijetunga; Nethalie Nanayakkara
- Opening theme: Kolamba Ithaliya
- Country of origin: Sri Lanka
- Original language: Sinhala
- No. of seasons: 1
- No. of episodes: 200

Production
- Producer: Sudharma Jayawardhana
- Production location: Colombo
- Running time: 20 mins

Original release
- Network: ITN
- Release: 31 May 2021 – 7 June 2022

Colomba Ithaliya (Sinhala: කොළඹ ඉතාලිය) is a Sri Lankan comedy-drama television series, broadcast on Independent Television Network. It is directed by Jayaprakash Sivagurunathan, produced by Sudharma Jayawardhana and written by Nilantha Perera. It airs every weekday from 9:00 pm to 9:30 pm onwards. The series started on 31 May 2021. It has received negative reviews from critics, particularly on screenplay and performances.

== Cast and characters ==
=== Main cast ===
- Shanudrie Priyasad as Andrea
- Sampath Jayaweera as Chandana
- Chanuka Prabuddha as Sulalitha
- Anuradha Edirisinghe as Priyanwada aka Princy
- Gayathri Dias as Asha Balasuriya
- Lal Kularatne
- Janak Premalal
- Ananda Athukorala
- Nilmini Kottegoda

=== Supporting cast ===
- Udeni Nadika
- Rohan Wijetunga
- Madushan Nanayakkara
- Nethalie Nanayakkara
- Amaya Wijesooriya
- Kavindu Madushan
- Rathna Sumanapala
- Dayasiri Hettiarachchi
- Gamini Jayalath
- Dev Surendra

=== Minor cast ===
- Aloka Sampath
- Janet Anthony
- Kulasiri Mallikarachchi
- Ranjan Suriyakumara
- Ananda S. Kapuge
- Kumuduni Adikari
- Dayananda Dewage
- Ranjith Kadupitiya
- Nilantha Mahawewa
- Pabasara Sulochana
- Upul Gunawardena
- Indika Madurage
- Dimuthu Jayasinghe
- Anura Weerasinghe

== See also ==
- ITN
