= Sumathi Best Television Documentary Award =

The Sumathi Best Television Documentary Award is presented annually in Sri Lanka by the Sumathi Group for the best Sri Lankan television documentary.

The award was first given in 1995. Following is a list of the winners since then.

== Awards ==
Year	Documentary	Director	Ref.
1995	Yudha Hamuda Rupavahini Ekakaya	Sri Lanka Rupavahini Corporation	
1996	Pahiyan Len Puranaya	Mahasena Morawaka	
1997	Namal Uyana	Sarath Kumara Perera	
1998	Asapuwa	Poojitha Dissanayake	
1999	Sundara Lanka	Sarath Kumara Perera	
2000	Atheethaya Bandunu Anagathaya	Sisira Suraweera	
2001	Neth Anda Muth	Poojitha Dissanayake	
2002	Sinharaja Wana Arana	Sarath Kumara Perera	
2003	Addara Jeewithaya	Lasantha Warushawithana	
2004	Gammanayaka Jewithaya	Upatissa P. Nissanka	
2006	Siddhartha Kathawa	Jeewantha Withanaarchchi	
2007	Charitha	Tharaka Wasalamudali	
2008	Badde Guru Tharuwa	Poojitha Dissanayake	
2009	Waapi	Athula Peiris	
2010	Siri Daladawatha	Ranjeewani Baddewithana	
2011	Ingi Nalu Sampradaye Narthana Rachakayano	Vineetha Karunaratne	
2012	Soiliyas	Namal Prasanna	
2013	Wavgam Paththuwe Siribara Govi Gabbarasiriyawa	Namal Prasanna	
2014	Pinsari - Sanchi Viharaya	P.U.D Perera	
2015	Kohomba Yak Kankariya	Hema Nalin Karunaratne	
2016	Sirilaka Katusu Parapura	Sri Lanka Rupavahini Corporation	
2017	Jeeva Soba	Pujitha Dissanayake	
2018	Pathi	Manjula Ethugala	
2019	Lathu Kalwe Heta Dawasa	Amith Priyanjana	
2021	Asirimath Horton Thenna	Pujitha Dasanayake	
