= Sumathi Best Teledrama Music Director Award =

The Sumathi Best Teledrama Music Director Award is presented annually in Sri Lanka by the Sumathi Group of Campany associated with many commercial brands for the best Sri Lankan music director of the year in television screen.

The award was first given in 1995. Following is a list of the winners of this prestigious title since then.

== Awards ==
Year	Best Music Director	Teledrama	Ref.
1995	Premasiri Khemadasa	Dandubasnamanaya	
1996	Rohana Weerasinghe	Sankranthi Samaya	
1997	Sarath de Alwis	Daha Aya Andiriya	
1998	Rohana Weerasinghe	Vilambheetha	
1999	Gayan Ganakadhara	Nisala Wila	
2000	Lionel Algama	Imadiya Mankada	
2001	Premasiri Khemadasa	Rajina	
2002	Navaratne Gamage	Vishwa Gamana	
2003	Gayan Ganakadhara; Eishani Ranganath	Asani Wasi	
2004	Harsha Makalanda	Ran Maheshi	
2005	Kapila Poogalaarchchi	Me Paaren Enna	
2006	Navaratne Gamage	Katu Imbula	
2007	Kapila Poogalaarchchi	Nagenahira Weralin	
2008	Navaratne Gamage	Sudu Kapuru Pethi	
2009	Sarath Wickrama	Arungal	
2010	Samantha Perera	Abarthu Atha	
2011	Dinesh Subasinghe	Pinsara Dosthara	
2012	Mithra Kapuge	Isiwara Ranakeli	
2013	Kasun Kalhara	Appachchi	
2014	Navaratne Gamage	Girikula	
2015	Samantha Perera	Daskon	
2016	Bhage Sri Fonseka	Thaara	
2017	Kapila Poogalaarchchi	Sonduru Dadayakkaraya	
2018	Kasun Kalhara	Sahodaraya	
2019	Lahiru Madivila	Awasan Husma Thek	
2020	Nadeeka Guruge	Sansararanya Asabada	
2021	Samantha Perera	Sakarma	
2022	Nadeeka Weligodapola	Peethru	
2023	Chamara Ruwanthilaka	Jeevithayen Ek Dawasak	
