= Sumathi Best Television Women's Program Award =

The Sumathi Best Television Women's Program Award is presented annually in Sri Lanka by the Sumathi Group of Campany associated with many commercial brands for the best Sri Lankan television women's program of the year in television screen.

The award was first given in 2014. Following is a list of the winners of this prestigious title since then.

== Awards ==
Year	Women's Program	Director	Ref.
2014	Liyaka Mahima	Kumari Manel	
2015	Bisowarunge Janapadaya	Namal Prasanna	
2016	Siragathawu Mathawan	Jayamini Ileperuma	
2017	Aeya Nathi Lowak	Pulindu Missaka Edirisinghe	
2018	Bewumaka Sitagath Geheniya	Sandya Widanawasam	
2019	Diriya Landun	Jayamini Ileperuma	
2021	Diviya Dinana Bisowaru	Amith Priyanjith	
