= Sumathi Best Commercial Award =

The Sumathi Best Television Commercial Award is presented annually in Sri Lanka by the Sumathi Group of Companies associated with many commercial brands for the best Sri Lankan television commercial of the year in television screen.

The award was first given in 1995. The award was given to the three best commercial advertising in each year for three advertisements. Following is a list of the winners of this prestigious title since then.

Year	Award advertising	Production company
1995	1st place - Kist Jam	Walter Thomas
1995	2nd place - Wim	Lintars
1995	3rd place - Signature	Minds Lanka
1996	1st place - Anchor Butter	TVT
1996	2nd place - Swarnamahal	Grant Macan Erikson
1996	3rd place - Wanik Bank	Homs Polad
1997	1st place - NIC Divimaga	Best Strategic Alliance
1997	2nd place - Lifton Tea	Walter Thomas
1997	3rd place - Babal Washing Poweder	Homs Polad
1998	1st place - Orange Barley	Lintars
1998	2nd place - Suntel	Lintars
1998	3rd place - Babal Washing Poweder	Walter Thomson
1999	1st place	Best Strategic Alliance
1999	2nd place	Walter Thomas
1999	3rd place	Lintars
2001	1st place - Polo	Lintars
2001	2nd place - Ginger Beer	Lintars
2001	3rd place - Shri FM	Walter Thomson
2002	1st place - Sunlight	Lintars
2002	2nd place - Sunlight	Lintars
2002	3rd place - Eagle Insurance	Walter Thomson
2003	1st place - Delux Pentalight	Thomson Associate
2003	2nd place - Lipton La-o-ge	Walter Thomson
2003	3rd place - Munchee Wishesha Balakaya	L.O.L.G.B
2004	1st place - Mobitel	Zineth Marcon Limited
2004	2nd place - Holcim Pedareru	Best Asia Limited
2004	3rd place - Vesak	Lio Bernad
2006	1st place - Poya Ad	Grant Macan Ericson
2006	2nd place - Pani Kaju	JLC Pvt Limited
2006	3rd place - Tokyo Cement	Lio Bernad
2007	1st place - Api Wenuwen Api	Trie Ads
2007	2nd place - Lama Surakum	Grans
2007	3rd place - Union Motors	K.W.T
2008	1st place - Mobitel	Lio Bernad Solutions
2008	2nd place - Teego	Grant Macan Solution
2008	3rd place - Mobitel Smart	Lio Bernad Solutions
2009	1st place - Mobitel Smart	Lio Bernad
2009	2nd place - Dialog Ad	K.W.D
2009	3rd place - Lanka Bell IDD Ad	Sarva Enterprises
2010	1st place - Mobitel Digin Digata Katha	Triads
2010	2nd place - Sunlight 125 years Ad	Unilever Limited
2010	3rd place - Union Assurance	Sarva Enterprises
2011	1st place - Lankaa Sanstha Waane	Lio Bernad
2011	2nd place - Union Assurance Motors	Triads
2011	3rd place - NSB Smile	Minds Integrated
2012	1st place - Lanka Bell Stanger	Sarva Enterprises
2012	2nd place - Mobitel Upahara	Response Marketing
2012	3rd place - Sri Lanka Eye Donation Society	Lio Bernad Solutions
2013	1st place - Coca-Cola Minute Maid	Lio Bernad
2013	2nd place - Lanka Bell Kos Gaha	Sarva Enterprises
2013	3rd place - Etisalat Lanka	Response Marketing
2014	1st place - AIA Insurance Poson Ad	TBW/TAL
2014	2nd place	Grant Macan Ericson
2014	3rd place - Commercial Credit Amba Seeya	JWT
2015	1st place - Commercial Credit Loved Ones	JWT
2015	2nd place - Sampath Bank Corporate	Grant Macan Ericson
2015	3rd place - Mobitel Skype	Triads
2016	1st place - Kotagala Kahata	Teleview Pvt. Limited
2016	2nd place - Kotagala Kahata	Teleview Pvt. Limited
2016	3rd place - UNICEF Child Abuse Phase 2	Leo Bernad Solutions
2019	1st place - Ape Tea	Exporters Ceylon (pvt) Ltd.
2019	2nd place - Mobitel Upahara	Mobitel
2019	3rd place - Lagna Wasana	National Lotteries Board

Year	Merit Award	Production company
2006	Anchor 1+	Minds F.C.D
2006	SLT Citylink	Lio Bernad
2007	Three-wheel Ads	Trade Lanka
2007	Telecom Ads	Lio Bernad
2009	Teego	Grant Macan Ericson
2009	Dammi Sugath Oyay Mamay	Triads
2012	Delux Akzo Nobel Paint	TBWA/TAL
2013	Commercial Credit Ran Naya Sewawa	Lio Bernad
2014	Mobitel Ads	Triads
2014	Seylan Bank	Triads
2015	BOC Senior Citizen	Sara Idea Pvt. Limited
2015	Sunquick Mother and Son	Grant Macan Ericson
2016	HDFC Bank Corporate Children	Holmes Pollard & Stott Pvt. Limited
2016	Shift Integrated Pvt. Limited	Airtel Lanka Be Brave SL Youth
2019	Beats Slippers	DSI Footwear
2019	Ritzbury	Ceylon Biscuits Limited
