= Sumathi Best Television Educational Program Award =

The Sumathi Best Television Educational Program Award is presented annually in Sri Lanka by the Sumathi for the best Sri Lankan television educational program.

The award was first given in 2011. Following is a list of the winners since then.

Year	Educational Program	Director	Ref.
2011	Pulasthi Pura	Ranjeewani Baddawithana	
2012	Natya Ranga Kalawa	Jayalath Chandrasiri	
2013	Threelakshanaya	Ranjeewani Baddawithana	
2014	Patibha	Ranjeewani Baddawithana	
2015	School Quiz	Nuwan Sri Jayawickrama	
2016	Jathika Pasala - Biology	Nilusha Mohotti	
2017	Lama Vidyagaraya	Thushari Gamage	
2018	Aakramanasheeli Aganthukayo	Poojitha Dasanayake	
2019	Jathika Pasala	Nilusha Mohotti	
2020	Jathika Pasala	Janaka Jayagoda	
2021	Man Asai Mata Kiyanna	Janaka Sujeewa Jayakody	
2022	Man Asai Mata Kiyanna	Janaka Sujeewa Jayakody	
2023	Kids Academy	K.C. Saranga	
