= Sumathi Best Television Current Affairs Award =

The Sumathi Best Television Current Affairs Award is presented annually in Sri Lanka by the Sumathi Group of Campany associated with many commercial brands for the best Sri Lankan television current affairs of the year in television screen.

The award was first given in 1995. Following is a list of the winners of this prestigious title since then.

== Awards ==
Year	Current Affairs	Producer	Ref.
1995	Vimasuma	Sumith Jayantha Dias	
1996	Vimasuma	Sumith Jayantha Dias	
1997	Balan Kadathura	Udaya Kumara Tennakoon	
1998	Kada Malla	P.M Senaratne	
1999	Wana Pasa Mala	Nishantha Obeysekara	
2000	Wana Pasa Mala	Nishantha Obeysekara	
2001	Helidarawwa	Tharaka Wasalamudaliarachchi	
2002	Helidarawwa	Tharaka Wasalamudaliarachchi	
2003	Angili Salakuna	Saddha Mangala Sooriyabandara	
2004	Yeheli	Jackson Anthony	
2006	Watarauma	Athula Priyankara Dissanayake	
2007	360	TV Derana	
2008	Kelin Kathawa	Lenin Indika	
2009	Kal Ikuth Wu Rudhira Parawiyalana	Thusitha Pitigala	
2010	Jana Handa	Samith Ranga Bandara	
2011	Rividina Arunalla	Sirimal Alahakoon	
2012	Sip Giman Hala	Prasad Komasaru	
2013	Janahanda	Uditha Mangala	
2014	Pinsari - Sanchi Viharaya	P.U.D Perera	
2015	Kiri Amma Daanaya	Kavinda Surain	
2016	Samaja Mehewara - Dompe Rohala	Jayamini Illeperuma	
2017	Jana Asuna	Saman Basnayake	
2018	Pahiyangala Landslide	TV Derana	
2019	Dumriye Gatena Ali	Anuradha Devapriya	
