= Sumathi Best Television Audio Visual Award =

The Sumathi Best Television Audio Visual Award is presented annually in Sri Lanka by the Sumathi Group for the best Sri Lankan television audio visual.

The award was first given in 2011. The award was given to the three best AV media in each year. However, the award did not presented since 2015. Following is a list of the winners since then.

Year	Audio Visual	Production
2011	1st place - Hiru Seera Wahila	Prasad Ranasinghe
2011	2nd place - Api Wenuwen Api	Wide Angles
2011	3rd place - Jeewithaya Danila	Viraj Waliwatte
2012	1st place - Kammali Kids Animation	Danushka Lakmal
2012	2nd place - Labadiye	Ayesh Wijeratne; Lahiru Perera
2012	3rd place - Sihina Manamaliye	-
2013	1st place - Kola Kanda	Wide Angles
2013	2nd place - Maha Purash	Thimila Wiranga
2013	3rd place - Oba Muwa Pura	Wide Angles
2017	1st place - Kola Kanda	Wide Angles
2017	2nd place - Maha Purash	Thimila Wiranga
2017	3rd place - Oba Muwa Pura	Wide Angles
2018	36 Wasaraka Abhimanaya Saha Pravardanaya	Santhusa Liyanage
2019	Eth Pavura	Eranda Rupasingh
