= Sumathi Best Teledrama Editor Award =

Annual award in Sri Lanka

The Sumathi Best Teledrama Editor Award is presented annually in Sri Lanka by the Sumathi Group for the best Sri Lankan editor in television.

The award was first given in 1995. Following is a list of the winners since then.

Year	Best Editor	Teledrama	Ref.
1995	Sisira K. Senarathne	Eka Gei Kurullo	
1996	Wasantha Kithsiri	Isiwara Asapuwa	
1997	Daya Punchihewa	Itipahan	
1998	Ravindra Guruge	Diya Keta Pahana	
1999	Daya Punchihewa	Nisala Wila	
2000	Daya Punchihewa	Nannadunanni	
2001	Ravindra Guruge	Rajina	
2002	Rukmal Nirosh	Sanda Amawakai	
2003	Rukmal Nirosh	Hada Wila Sakmana	
2004	Jagath Weeratunga	-	
2005	Priyantha Guruge	Theth Saha Wiyali	
2006	Chanaka de Silva	Katu Imbula	
2007	Manjula Nikahatiya; M.Yogendran	Nagenahira Weralin	
2008	Dimuth Kuruppu	Sudu Kapuru Pethi	
2009	Tharanga Kumarasinghe	Arungal	
2010	Lakruwan de Seram	Ayal	
2011	Rangana Sinharage	Kadadora	
2012	Jagath Weerathunga	Ahasin Watuna	
2013	Jagath Weerathunga	Agni	
2014	Rukmal Nirosh	Sulanga Matha Mohothak	
2015	Thiwanka Udagedara	Daskon	
2016	Jagath Weeratunga	Maddahana	
2017	Himal Dharmaratne	See Raja	
2018	Indika Jayawardena	Thaththa	
2019	Anusha Sanjeewa	Awasan Husma Thek	
2020	Lakruwan de Seram	Thanamalvila Kollek	
2021	Buddhika Ranasinghe	Sakarma	
2022	Dilan Wickramarachchi	Once Upon a Time in Colombo	
2023	Chandana Liyanage	Kodi Gaha Yata	
