= Hasantha Hettiarachchi =

Sri Lankan journalist and television presenter

Dr. Hasantha Hettiarachchi
- හසන්ත හෙට්ටිආරච්චි
- Born: Hasantha Srilal Hettiarachchi; 21 December; Warakapola, Sri Lanka
- Education: Mirigama Bandaranaike Vidyalaya
- Alma mater: University of Colombo; Wako University; University of Kelaniya
- Occupations: Journalist, media director, TV presenter, scriptwriter, researcher, program production manager
- Years active: 1998–present
- Spouse: Chamudika Piyumi (m. 2011)
- Children: 2
- Awards: Keerthi Sri

Keerthi Sri Dr. Hasantha Srilal Hettiarachchi (Sinhala: හසන්ත හෙට්ටිආරච්චි; born 21 December) is a Sri Lankan journalist and television presenter. He is considered as an iconic figure of Sri Lankan media most notable for the popular television programs Atapattama and Doramadalawa.

== Personal life ==
He was born on 21 December in Warakapola, Kegalle in a family with three siblings. His father is a businessman. He completed education from Mirigama Bandaranaike Vidyalaya. After passing G.C.E A/L, he entered University of Colombo and obtained a Special degree on Mass Communication. He got the award for best Announcer at the university media festival.

In 2011, he received his honorary doctorate from the University of Kelaniya. He is a lecturer at the University of Kelaniya and the Nagananda Buddhist Educational Institute.

He is married to Chamudika Piyumi. President Mahinda Rajapaksa and Professor Sumanapala Galmangoda signed the marriage witnesses. The wedding was celebrated on 5 May 2011. The couple has two daughters. Elder daughter was born on 2012 and younger daughter was born on 2014.

== Career ==
At the school times, he acted on the school stage. He wrote poems and short stories as well as engaged with television programs. At the age of 11, Hettiarachchi joined Muthuhara children's program. In that time, he launched his first poetry book Visa Katu. He wrote a short story Parajithayo which won the best Youth Award in 1990.

After obtaining degree, Hettiarachchi joined the television channel Independent Television Network as a guest producer and a presenter in 1996. His first documentary shows are "Sigiriya" and "Siripada" as a guest producer. Then he produced other programs such as "Siyathrawaya", "Vee Man Saa", "Vishva Yaathra" and "Kedella". In the meantime, he got a scholarship and entered the Wako University in Japan to study for a master's degree in 1999. He worked closely with the NHK, Japanese National TV channel. After returning to Sri Lanka in 2000, he continued to work in ITN.

In 2000, he produced the program Atapattama. The program started as a filler program for a teledrama aired on that time slot. After The number of episodes of the teledrama telecast at 8 pm is over, Head of the Program Division Ranjith Hewabatage asked Hettiarachchi to start a program to fill the gap. Hettiarachchi laughed at Hewabatage at that time and said, "Hadisiye Atapattamak thama hadala denna wenne" (meaning "It is not possible, all this hurry it may be an Octagon to make"). After aired, the program was highly popularized. Atapattama (means Octagon) is the structure with 8 frames and 8 sides. It reveals that the program consist with wide array of scopes throughout the world such as comedy stuff, international cultures, animal world, Guinness records, amazing creations, and extraordinary things of ordinary people and particularly Atapattam Loka Savariya (Atapattam World Tour).

Hettiarachchi continued to produce and perform the program with the titular role "Dadibidis". This is a nickname he used for this program as a communication strategy. But it was unexpectedly popular. The show is continuously airing on ITN on every Wednesday at 7:30 pm. It is the only program in Sri Lanka to be awarded in 11 consecutive times as the most popular program of the each year at SLIM-Nielsen Peoples Awards.

In 2001, Hettiarachchi produced the program Doramadalawa. It is an educational as well as academic program. The show continuously airing on ITN on every Monday at 10 pm. It does in a timely manner with current situations with several resource persons.

Apart from media, Hettiarachchi has published about 12 books including, Urumayada Karumayada, Sutikka Miya Giyeya, Takaran Puththu and Prakaraya. Among other author works are translations of Japanese children's stories and Chinese illustrations. He also produced two stage dramas called Muwa and Lokoththara.

He worked as Human Resource manager for ITN for few years. In January 2020, he was appointed as the Director General of ITN. Even though the appointment was criticized.

== Awards ==
He has received more than 40 awards in local award festivals. He is a recipient of Keerthi Sri award from Sabaragamuwa University of Sri Lanka.

In 2003, he was accorded with TOYP award. In 2007, Doramadalawa won Best Television Magazine Program Award at Sumathi Awards. During an assessment done by Survey Research Lanka (SRL), it was revealed that more than 7 lakhs TV viewers gathered only two these two programs. In 2003, Hettiarachchi was awarded as one of the Outstanding Young Persons of Sri Lanka at the award ceremony organised by the International Junior Chamber of Commerce. In 2004 and 2005, he won the award for best announcer. Then in 2006, he won Best TV presenter award in very first State Tele Awards.
