= Patti Gedara =

Sri Lankan television series

- Genre: Teledrama; Drama
- Directed by: Anushka Rasanjana de Silva
- Starring: Dinakshie Priyasad Dammika Bandara; Janet Anthony; Rebecca Dilrukshi; Tharindu Kavinda Gamage; Dulanj Dilshan; Chinthaka Waas; Nilanthi Gunawardena; Lochana Isurundi; Shawinda Lakshan; Kasun Tharaka; Chaminda Batakotuwa; Samantha Paranaliyanage
- Country of origin: Sri Lanka
- Original language: Sinhala
- No. of seasons: 1
- No. of episodes: 72

Production
- Producer: Sudesh Muthu
- Production location: Sri Lanka
- Running time: 20 minutes

Original release
- Network: Independent Television Network
- Release: October 18, 2025 – June 21, 2026

Patti Gedara is a Sri Lankan family drama television series broadcast by the Independent Television Network (ITN). Directed by Anushka Rasanjana de Silva and produced by Sudesh Muthu, the series premiered on 18 October 2025. It aired every Saturday and Sunday at 9:00 p.m. (SLST) and concluded on 21 June 2026, after a run of 72 episodes.

== Plot ==
Patti Gedara is a teledrama set in a rural Sri Lankan environment, presenting traditional family relationships, love, and current social crises with a blend of humor and sensitivity. The story mainly revolves around a family living in a village and the daily events faced by the villagers around them. The main conflict of the story is created by the deep bonds between family members, property issues, and the revelation of some hidden secrets from the past. The conflict between the romantic relationships of youth, traditional adult ideologies, and the thinking of the new generation is well depicted here.The primary objective of this production is to convey an important social message to the audience through the way the characters behave in the face of challenges within the family unit, and ultimately how they collectively resolve problems, while highlighting the authenticity and beauty of village life.

== Cast and characters ==
=== Main cast ===
- Dammika Bandara as Sadev (Sudu Malli)
- Dinakshi Priyasad as Sudu Nona ( Loku)
- Janet Anthony as Upali
- Rebecca Dilrukshi as Nandani

=== Supporting cast ===
- Tharindu Kavinda Gamage as Gamini (Upali's brother)
- Dulanj Dilshan as Aravinda (Ukkuwa)
- Chinthaka Waas as Newton (Patti Gedara father)
- Nilanthi Gunawardena as Gayani
- Lochana Isurundi as Baby
- Shawinda Lakshan as Hicchi
- Kasun Tharaka as Sudda
- Chaminda Batakotuwa as Sediris
- Samantha Paranaliyanage as Jayatissa
