= Sumathi Best Teledrama Makeup Artist Award =

The Sumathi Best Teledrama Makeup Artist Award is presented annually in Sri Lanka by the Sumathi Group for the best Sri Lankan makeup artist in television.

The award was first given in 1995. Following is a list of the winners since then.

Year	Best Makeup Artist	Teledrama	Ref.
1995	Wasantha Vittachchi	Dandubasnamanaya	
1996	Hemantha Gamage	Maha Naduwa	
1997	Ranjith Mathangaweera; J.Suranimala	Pitagamkarayo	
1998	Samarasiri Kandanage	Wanawadule Wasanthaya	
1999	Wasantha Vittachchi	Akaala Sandya	
2000	Priyantha Siri Kumara	Bhawana	
2001	Wasantha Vittachchi	Kemmura	
2002	Priyantha Siri Kumara	Sanda Amawakai	
2003	Senarath Bandara	Derana	
2004	Ranjith Thilakasiri	Bogala Saundiris	
2006	Imaal Shanaka Pieris	Viya Sidura	
2007	Nalin Premathilake	Katu Imbula	
2008	Chandana Senarath Bandara	Sandagala Thanna	
2009	Dananjaya Thotagamuwa	Kaluwara Gedara	
2010	Wasantha Vittachchi	Ridee Ittankaraya	
2011	Priyantha Eshwara	Diyamatha Ruwa	
2012	Gayani Satharasinghe	Pinsara Dosthara	
2013	Wasantha Poornawansa	Ahasin Watuna	
2014	Wasantha Vittachchi	Boradiya Kandura	
2015	Gihan Ovita	Girikula	
2016	Harsha Manjula	Daskon	
2017	Narada Thotagamuwa; Vidhura Abeydheera	Chakra	
2018	Harsha Manjula	See Raja	
2019	Nalin Premathilake	Minigandela	
