= Sumathi Best Teledrama Cameraman Award =

Sri Lankan television award

The Sumathi Best Teledrama Cameraman Award is presented annually in Sri Lanka by the Sumathi Group of Companies for the best Sri Lankan cameraman in television.

The award was first given in 1995. Following is a list of the winners since then.

Year	Best Cameraman	Teledrama	Ref.
1995	Nilantha Chularatne	Dandubasnamanaya	
1996	Lal Wickramarachchi	Kasthirama	
1997	M.D Mahindapala	Pitagamkarayo	
1998	Lal Wickramarachchi	Durganthaya	
1999	K.D Dharmasena	Maya	
2000	Palitha Perera	Imadiya Mankada	
2001	Sumith Prasanna Lal	Anthassarayo	
2002	Palitha Perera	Sanda Amawakai	
2003	Prabath Roshana	Kokila Sandawaniya	
2004	Manoj Roshan Ranasinghe	WWW.com	
2006	Prabath Roshana	Theth Saha Wiyali	
2007	Chandana Jayasinghe	Olu	
2008	Chinthaka Somakeerthi	Rasthiyadukaraya	
2009	Donald Karunaratne	Kampithawila	
2010	Thilak Ranjan	Ridee Ittankaraya	
2011	Pradeep Bulathsinhala	Ayal	
2012	Chinthaka Somakeerthi	Kadadora	
2013	Dhammika Rathnayake	Ahasin Watuna	
2014	Dhammika Rathnayake	Appachchi	
2015	Sudesh Dhammika	Sulanga Matha Mohothak	
2016	Dhammika Rathnayake	Daskon	
2017	Thisara Thulwan	Maddahana	
2018	Wishwajith Karunaratne	See Raja	
2019	Sanjeewa Alahapperuma	Thaththa	
2021	Thusitha Anuradha	Awasan Husma Thek	
