= Sumathi Best Television Children's Program Award =

Sri Lankan television award

The Sumathi Best Television Children's Program Award is presented annually in Sri Lanka by the Sumathi Group of Campany associated with many commercial brands for the best Sri Lankan television children's program of the year in television screen.

The award was first given in 2011. Following is a list of the winners of this prestigious title since then.

== Awards ==
Year	Children's Program	Director	Ref.
2011	Sunil G	Athula Ransirilal	
2012	Paha Saraniya	Gamini Jayantha Abeywickrama	
2013	Tomiyay Kitiyay	Athula Ransirilal	
2014	Podi Hamuduruwo	Athula Ransirilal	
2015	Supiri Hapana	Udayakumara Tennakoon; Lakshman Mangalage; Tushara Gamage; Shantha Soysa	
2016	Punchi Ape Awurudda	Pradeep Mahesh Liyanage	
2017	Tikiri Sina Mal	Nuwan Priya Abeykoon	
2018	Tin Tin Mama	Kapila Sooriyarachchi & Health Department	
2019	Naththale Niwaduwak	Heshan Wasanthapriya	
2021	Kurullanta Gee	Malathi Weerasinghe	
