= Sumathi Most Popular Teledrama Award =

Sri Lankan television award

The Sumathi Most Popular Teledrama Series Award is presented annually in Sri Lanka by the Sumathi Group of Campany associated with many commercial brands for the popular Sri Lankan teledrama series of the year in television screen.

The award was first given in 1995. Following is a list of the winners of this prestigious title since then.

| Year | Teledrama Series | Producer | Ref. |
|---|---|---|---|
| 1995 | Dandubasnamanaya | Sunil Rathnayake | |
| 1996 | Sankranthi Samaya | Ananda Abenayake | |
| 1997 | Hingana Kolla | Aruna Mendis; Ruwan Mendis | |
| 1998 | Naedaeyo | Sandya Mendis | |
| 1999 | Senehewanthayo | Sandya Mendis | |
| 2000 | Sahas Gau Dura | Lucky Dias | |
| 2001 | Kemmura | Lucky Dias | |
| 2002 | Sathpura Wasiyo | Sandya Mendis | |
| 2003 | Dahas Gaw Dura | Swarnavahini | |
| 2004 | Suriya Daruwo | Sandya Mendis | |
| 2005 | Not Awarded | | |
| 2006 | Jeewithayata Ida Denna | Ananda Abenayake | |
| 2007 | Olu | Swarnavahini | |
| 2008 | Sandagala Thanna | Sri Lanka Rupavahini Corporation | |
| 2009 | Paba | Independent Television Network | |
| 2010 | Ithin Eeta Passe | Independent Television Network | |
| 2011 | Bonda Meedum | Independent Television Network | |
| 2012 | Sihina Piyapath | Independent Television Network | |
| 2013 | Chaya | Sirasa TV | |
| 2014 | Adara Dasak | Independent Television Network | |
| 2015 | Uthum Pathum | Sirasa TV | |
| 2016 | Kasi Watta | Independent Television Network | |
| 2017 | Deweni Inima | TV Derana | |
| 2018 | Ape Adare | Siyatha TV | |
| 2019 | Sudu Andagena Kalu Awidin | Sri Lanka Rupavahini Corporation | |
| 2020 | Not Awarded | | |
| 2021 | Thadhee | Independent Television Network | |
| 2022 | Not Awarded | | |
| 2023 | Paara Dige | Swarnawahini | |
| 2024 | Divithura | Hiru TV | |
| 2025 | Paata Kurullo | Hiru TV | |
| 2026 | Paata Kurullo | Hiru TV | |
