= Hema Nalin Karunaratne =

Sri Lankan journalist and television presenter

- හේමනලීන් කරුණාරත්න
- Born: Hema Nalin Karunaratne; 27 August 1962; Wadduwa, Sri Lanka
- Died: 5 June 2018 (aged 55); Colombo, Sri Lanka
- Education: Royal College, Colombo
- Occupations: Journalist, media director, TV presenter, scriptwriter, researcher, program production manager
- Years active: 1983–2018

Hema Nalin Karunaratne (Sinhala: හේම නලීන් කරුණාරත්න; 27 August 1962 – 5 June 2018) was a Sri Lankan journalist and television presenter. He is considered as an iconic figure of Sri Lankan media, having inspired many generations of media personalities. Across his career, Karunaratne worked in numerous areas, including direction, script writing, research, program production management, television presentation, and as a compere. He was also the owner of the Heritage TV channel on Dialog TV.

== Personal life ==
Karunaratne was born on 27 August 1962 in Wadduwa, Colombo. His father, Galaboda Payagalage Chulasena Karunaratne, was an electrical engineer and his mother, Eugene Leelarathna Perera, was a teacher. He also had an older brother, Jeewath Karunaratne. Karunaratne received his primary education at St. Mary's College in Mathugama and completed his secondary education at Royal College, Colombo.

Karunaratne was married to Iresha Karunaratne, a sociologist. His daughters attend school in Colombo.

== Career ==
From a young age, Karunaratne was passionate about working in television. He was exposed to television work by his aunt on his mother's side, Praba Ranatunge, who was the first female newsreader for the Sri Lanka Broadcasting Corporation. His first job in the industry began on 1 February 1983, when he started working at the Sri Lanka Rupavahini Corporation as a trainee producer. In July 1983, Karunaratne gave his first news report about a bomb blast.

As a compere, Karunaratne first worked on Sandesha Kavya and then later the children's programme, Mang Podi Kale. After working for 17 years at the Sri Lanka Rupavahini Corporation, he joined Swarnavahini in June 2000 as a creative director. Karunaratne was responsible for the creation of the Swarnavahini motto, "Sri Lanka's Pride" (Sri Lankiya Abimanaya). He left Swarnavahini in 2008 to join the documentary broadcaster Heritage TV. At Heritage TV, Karunaratne worked on programs covering culture and nature.

Karunaratne hosted notable programmes like 9.05, Hathata Hithata Hadawathata, Hapan Padura, Mang Podi Kale, Prathiba, Jeewithaya Lassanai teledrama, Sundara Senasurada, Hansa Wila, Maha Sinhale Wansa Kathawa, Dutu Nodutu, Perawadana, and Loke Wate.

== Death ==
On 5 June 2018, Karunaratne died at age 55 from a cerebral haemorrhage. He died at his residence in Colombo, Sri Lanka. His body was found the next day and the cause of death was determined to be an intra-ventricular hemorrhage due to ruptured blood vessels in the brain. His funeral was held at the Borella General Cemetery on 8 June 2018.

== Awards ==
- Sumathi Award for Most Popular Teledrama of the Year – Jeewithaya Lassanai.
