= Sumathi Best Television Sports Program Award =

The Sumathi Best Television Sports Program Award is presented annually in Sri Lanka by the Sumathi Group for the best Sri Lankan television sports program.

The award was first given in 2011. Following is a list of the winners since then.

Year	Sports Program	Director	Ref.
2011	Sports Hits	Saranga Pathirana	
2012	Asiyanu Malala Kreeda	Kumari Manel	
2013	Kota Bakiniye Kona Mangallaya	Priyantha Maddumage	
2014	Gam Madde Keli Sellam	Priyantha Maddumage	
2015	Jathika Kreedawe Salakuna	Priyantha Maddumage	
2016	Sports Hits - Kantha Wedikkari	Manjula Basnayake	
2017	Ran Pelahara	Kumari Manel	
2018	Air force Cycle Race	Susantha Premachandra	
2019	Pulsar Dare Venture	Chandana de Almeida	
2021	Beyond The Boundary	Yenuka Dassanayake	
