= Swarnavahini =

Sri Lankan Sinhala-language television channel

Swarnavahini (Sinhala: ස්වර්ණවාහිනී; literally Golden Channel) is a Sinhala language general entertainment and news television channel in Sri Lanka owned by EAP Broadcasting Company, a subsidiary of EAP Holdings. Launched in 1994 as ETV (Extra Terrestrial Vision), it was one of Sri Lanka's first privately owned television channels. Its sister channel ETV 2 was launched in 1995 when ETV was re-branded ETV 1. The channel's owner Extra Terrestrial Vision (Private) Limited, who had been incorporated on 6 July 1992, changed its name to EAP Network (Private) Limited on 30 April 1996 following the acquisition by EAP. At that time ETV 1 was re-broadcasting BBC. ETV 1 was re-launched as Swarnavahini, a mass market Sinhala language channel, on 16 March 1997. EAP Network (Private) Limited changed its name to EAP Broadcasting Company (Private) Limited on 16 May 2012, EAP Network (Private) Limited on 31 October 2012, EAP Network Limited on 28 August 2013 and EAP Broadcasting Company Limited on 11 September 2013.

It is available via satellite on Dialog TV (channel 7) and Dish TV (channel 2516). It is also available on Lanka Broadband Networks cable TV and PEO TV IPTV (channel 6).

== History ==
Swarnavahini aired its first news bulletin Live at 8 on 7 July 2000. The popular news reading program Mul Pituwa presented by journalist Bandula Padmakumara successfully aired its 1000th program on 30 March 2006. In 2009, the channel increased its roster of talent shows.

In 2019, EAP Broadcasting Company's parent company, EAP Holdings, was acquired by Lyca Group. EAP Broadcasting Company is a subsidiary of Ben Holdings along with Lyca Productions.

== Teledramas ==
=== Finished Teledramas ===
- Kolam Kuttama
- Yamini (TV Series)
- Bandana
- "Dekada kada"
- "Nadagamkarayo"
- "Paara Dige"
- "Piridu Lamai"
- "Once up on a time in COLOMBO"
- "Massa"
- "KEY"
- "Nonimi"
- Aganthukaya
- Agni Piyapath
- Amaliya
- Amuthu Rasikaya
- Anantha
- Anguru Siththam
- Appachchi
- "As"
- Boheemiyanuwa
- Bus Eke Iskoole
- Click
- Chalo
- Dadayam Bambaru
- Dangale (re-run)
- Dangamalla
- Dara Garage
- Daskon
- Eka Iththaka Mal
- Golu Thaththa
- Haara Kotiya
- Hadawathe Kathawa
- Hansa Pihatu
- Hoda Wade
- Ingi Bingi
- Kalu Araliya
- Kota Uda Mandira
- Kotipathiyo
- Kumi
- Meedum Amma
- Monara Kadadasi
- Monarathenna
- Naana Kamare
- Night Learners
- Nadagamkarayo
- Olu (re-run)
- Package
- Pooja
- Pithru
- Queen
- Raja Sabhawa
- Ran Bedi Minissu
- Saki
- Sakuge Kathawa
- Sanda Pini Wessa
- See Raja
- Sepalika
- Sihina Samagama
- Sikka
- Sillara Samanallu
- Snap
- Teacher Amma
- Thara
- Thattu Gewal
- Thawa Durai Jeewithe
- Wes & Wes Next Chapter
- Walawettuwa
- Yakada Kahawanu

=== Dubbed Teledramas ===
- Aladdin - Naam Toh Suna Hoga as Aladdin
- Paramavatar Shri Krishna as Maharaja Kansa
- Chandra Nandini as Chandra Nandani
- Tamanna as Me Mage Sihinayayi
- Saath Nibhaana Saathiya as Mage Sanda Obai
- Mahabharat as Mahabharat
- Shaka Laka Boom Boom as Maya Pensala
- My Girl as Samanali
- Do Dil Bandhe Ek Dori Se as Shivani

=== Cartoons ===
- Silvan - සිල්වාන්
- Gladiator Academy - සෙන්පති අඩවිය
- Prudence Investigations - රෝසි ආච්චි
- Franklin - ෆ්‍රැන්ක්ලින්
- Ghostbusters
- Heman
- Moby Dick - මොබි ඩික්
- Puss in Boots
- සූත්තර කිටී
- All Hail King Julien - පුතානෝ සහ කොටානෝ

=== English Kids Movies (Sinhala Dubbed) ===
- Kids Toons
- Movie Toons
- Hachiko
- Frozen

Upcoming Shows

- Wonderland Vanchavak
