= Michelle Dilhara filmography =

- Occupations: Actress; Presenter
- Years active: 2016–present

Michelle Dilhara is a Sri Lankan actress, presenter and a philanthropist. She has appeared in over Fifteen teledramas. This is a list of roles performed by Michelle Dilhara.Currently she holds the record for the most likes on a Facebook post in Sri Lanka. She became popular as Podi Patharakari (Sinhala: පොඩි පත්තරකාරී) in Salsapuna Teledrama on Sirasa TV.

== Appearances in Tele-dramas ==
Year	Teledrama	Role	Director	Channel	Notes	Ref.
2016	Dedunai Adare	Sub Role	Saranga Mendis	TV Derana	First Television serial	
2016	Bodhi	Sub Role	Sanjaya Nirmal	Sirasa TV		
2016	Dhara	Main Role		Mobile Phone App	First Mobile Teledrama, Produced by Susila Productions	
2016-17	Salsapuna	Preethiva (Podi Patharakari)	Nalan Mendis	Sirasa TV	Produced by Susuila Productions	
2017	Emy	Main Role	Sanjaya Nirmal	ITN	Produced by Plus one Productions	
2018	Sidu (Malee 3)	Cameo Appearance for few episodes		TV Derana		
2018	Sudu Andagena Kalu Awidin	Main Role	Sunil Costa	Rūpavāhinī		
2018	Thuththiri	Main Role	Sanjaya Nirmal	Sirasa TV	Produced by UA Palliyaguru	
2018	Dankuda Banda	Main Role	Priyantha Sri Samarakoon	Sirasa TV	Produced by Plus one Productions	
2018	Poori (teledrama)	Sub Role	Ranil kulasinghe	ITN	Produced by Janaka Sampath	
2018	Crime Scene	Sub Role	UA Palliyaguru	Rūpavāhinī	Produced by UA Palliyaguru	
2018	Kanthoru Moru	Main Role	Suranga Satharasinghe	TV Derana	Produced by Suranga Satharasinghe	
2019	Hartha Hera	Main Role	Chandika Wijesena	ITN	Produced by Chandika Nanayakkara	
2019	Dadayam Bambaru	Sub Role	Sanjaya Nirmal	Swarnavahini	Produced by Swarnawahini	
2019	Manu Saththu	Sub Role	Sumudu Wellalage			
2019	Kissa	Main Role	Nimal Rathnayaka			
2019	Waramadda	Sub Role	Iresh Lokubandara			
2019	Sihina Kumari	Main Role	Roshan Weerasinghe			
2020	Sihina Samagama	Sub Role	Thilina Boralessa	Swarnavahini		
2020	Can You Hear Me?	Main Role	Sunil Costa	Rūpavāhinī		
2021	Mati Kadulu	Main Role	Nimal Rathnayaka	Rūpavāhinī		
2021	Sakuna Piyapath	Main Role	Cristy Shelton	ITN		
2021	Pork Street	Main Role	Shalinda Rathnayaka	ITN		
2021	Race	Main Role	Danushka Raymand	Siyatha TV		
2022	Podu 2	Main Role	Sharmila Dharmarasa	TV Derana		
2022	Lokaa	Navya		ITN		
2022	Kaasi	Main Role	Iresh Lokubandara	Rūpavāhinī		
2023	Sidadiye Samanaliyo	Malka / Thrilakshi	Dhananjaya Siriwardena	Swarnavahini		
2024	Lalai Lilai Lai	Mila	Supun Rathnayaka	Swarnavahini		
2024	Rasa Rahasak	Mishara		Sirasa TV		
2024	Ayachana	Elina	Pasindu Nupearachchi	ITN		
2026	Ron Soya		Pathum Ekanayake	Hiru TV		
2026	Siri	Siri / Meera	Priyantha Colombage	Hiru TV		

== Filmography ==
Year	Film	Language	Role	Ref.
2018	Udumbara	Sinhala	Michelle	
2024	Solo Town	Sinhala	Ama	
2025	Adhiran	Tamil, Sinhala	Kaveetha	

== Television shows ==
Program	Channel	Year	Notes
16+	Sirasa TV	2018	Music Programme
Weekend Winode	Swarnavahini	2019	Music Programme

== Television advertisements ==
Year	Title	Role
2017	Maliban Tea	Main role
2018	Maliban Tea	Main role
2018	Bajaj Platina Comfortec	Main role
2018	Siddhi herbal tea	Main role
2021	Oppo Real Me	Main role
2021	Fair and Lovely	Sub role
2022	Sensodyne	Main role

== Music videos ==
Year	Title	Director(s)	Vocalist	Her role	Ref.
2019	Adara Belman (ආදරේ බැල්මන්)	Sathsara Kasun Pathirana	Nilan Hettiarachchi ft Gayani Madusha	A photographer	
2019	Umathu Prema Kumara (උමතු ප්‍රේම කුමරා)	Dilan Perera	Shashika Nisansala	A dancing girl	
2020	Nethra (නේත්‍රා)		Abhisheka Wimalaweera	A daughter	
2024	Sinasennata (සිනාසෙන්නට)	Janadara Samaradiwakara	Arun Jeromy	Aanya	
