= Selvam =

Selvam may refer to:

== People with the first name ==
- Selvam Suresh Kumar, cricketer for the Chennai Super Kings
- Selva (director), director of Tamil language movies

== People with the last name ==
- Cyril Selvam, judge of the Madras High Court

== Nicknames ==
- Selvam Adaikalanathan, politician in the Parliament of Sri Lanka
- S. J. V. Chelvanayakam, post-independence politician in the Sri Lanka Parliament

== Media ==
- Selvam (1966 film), a Tamil film directed by K. S. Gopalakrishnan, starring Sivaji Ganesan and K. R. Vijaya
- Selvam (2005 film), a Tamil film directed by Agathiyan, starring Nandha Durairaj and Uma
- Selvam (2011 film), a Sinhala film Sanjaya Leelarathne, starring Joe Abeywickrama and Malini Fonseka
