= Divithura (TV series) =

Sri Lankan television series

- title card
- Genre: Comedy; Action; Thriller; Reality
- Created by: Kaushalya Pathirana
- Directed by: Chamara Jayaweera
- Voices of: Hector Dias
- Opening theme: Sihisare Sathsare
- Ending theme: a generic musical effect
- Country of origin: Sri Lanka
- Original language: Sinhala
- No. of seasons: 1
- No. of episodes: 655

Production
- Executive producer: Hiru TV
- Production locations: Colombo; Nuwara Eliya
- Cinematography: Vishwajith Karunaratne
- Running time: 18 to 22 minutes

Original release
- Network: Hiru TV
- Release: April 23, 2021 – May 9, 2024

Divithura is a 2021 Sri Lankan reality thriller teledrama broadcast on Hiru TV. The series is directed by Chamara Jayaweera, produced by Hiru TV and created by Kaushalya Pathirana. It was released on 23 April 2021 to 9 May 2024, finally showing and continues in every weekday from Monday to Friday at 8:00 pm to 8:30 pm.

The teledrama stars popular singer Hector Dias in his acting debut along with Shanudrie Priyasad and Himali Sayurangi in lead roles. The supporting cast includes singer Athula Adikari, Sujeewa Priyal, Soorya Dayaruwan, Nilushi Pawanya and Sarath Karunarathne whereas veteran singer Chandrika Siriwardena also made her return to acting.

== Plot ==
The drama revolves around a reality program. The program owner, Themiya has chosen three judges including famous singer, Agasti. Agasti has an illegitimate daughter, Esha, but refuses to reveal it. On the other hand, Esha who was told by her mother that her father was met with an accident, finds out that Agasti is her actual father. After that, Esha decides to join with the reality program to revenge upon her father as the reason of she was orphaned by father 20 years before.

In the first selections Esha did not get a chance, therefore she scolds Agasthi in the stage, Themiya requests Esha to rejoin the programme as he realizes that Esha is the only way to get revenge upon Agasthi. In the next round Esha gets selected with the votes of Wajira and Agathi's fiancée Windy. Due to this clashes happen between Agasthi and Windy but she regrets it. Esha's mother loved Agathi for years and Thatupathi, a heartbroken musician loved Samadi for years among them Samadi chooses Agasthi. But after Agasthi goes to Bhathkande university to study music he quickly forgets Samadi.

Esha learns music from Tharupathi. There he meets Udul who builds up a crush with Esha. Also Ududl's half brother Vishal, a rising star contestant builds a crush with Esha as well. In the rising star Esha meets Rehana, a rap singer she helps Esha to solve the problems with Kavya a stubborn contestant in the same reality show.

In the next round Esha gets selected from the votes of all three judges Wajra, Windy and Subhani whom Themiya selected by playing a nasty plan. Agasthi gets angry with Windy and disappears for three days. In the next round Esha gets selected by the Wajira's golden buzzer opportunity. In the fourth rounds Esha decides to reveal her secret to the country on the stage.

== Cast ==
- Hector Dias as Agashthi
- Himali Sayurangi as Samadhi
- Shanudrie Priyasad as Isha
- Athula Adhikari as Tharupathi
- Cletus Mendis as Isha Grand Father
- Sujeewa Priyalal as Themiya
- Nilushi Pawanya as Vindy
- Soorya Dayaruwan as Udul
- Kelum Sri as Vishal
- Janaka Kumbukage as Vishal Father
- Niroshan Illeperuma as Samadhi Friend
- Nayana Kumari as Vishal Mother
- Wageesha Salgadu as Kavya
- Sarath Karunarathna as Sameera
- Sanjana Onali as Teena
- Chandrika Siriwardena as Wajeera Medam
- Sanath Wimalasiri as Samadhi Friend
- Ramya Wanigasekara as Vindy Mother
- Dhananjaya Siriwardena as Program Presenter
- Hyacinth Wijeratne as Udul Grand Mother
- Sudeeksha Samadhi as Rehana
- Yohan Perera as Isha Friend
- Chathuranga Kodithuwakku as Isha Friend
- Manel Wanaguru as Teena Mother
- Wasantha Wittachchi as Isha Grand Father Friend
- Chandika Nanayakkara
- Milinda Madugalle as Vishal Friend
- Geetha Kanthi Jayakody as Vindy Aunt
- Duleeka Marapana as Deepthi
- Pathum Rukshan
- Srimal Wedisinghe as Minister
- Sanath Gunathilake as Cameo appearance
- Lucky Dias as Cameo appearance
- Gayathri Dias as Cameo appearance
- Kusum Perera as Cameo appearance

== Teledrama songs ==
- Sihiaye Sathsare by Hector Dias
- Mama Hithak Ridawa by Athula Adikari

== Accident ==
On 30 July 2021, veteran actress Hyacinth Wijeratne died at the age of 75 after succumbing to severe injuries during a fatal road accident at Lindula, Thalawakala. She met with the accident, after finishing her shooting schedule in the teledrama, and was returning to Colombo in the early morning. She played the role as the "grandmother of Udul" in the series.

== See also ==
- Nadagamkarayo
