= Sandani Fernando =

Sri Lankan Actress, Model and Television presenter

- සඳනි ප්‍රනාන්දු
- Born: Warnakulasuriya Sandani Malsha Fernando; September 7, 1998 (age 27)
- Education: Negombo South International School
- Occupations: Actress; dancer; model; TV host
- Years active: 2017–present
- Mother: Johan Hemali Fernando
- Relatives: Thilina Fernando (cousin)

Sandani Fernando (born 7 September 1998), popularly known as Sandani Fernando, is an actress in Sri Lankan cinema and television. Started her career as a model, Sandani later became one of the popular television actresses particularly with the role 'Rashmi' in the popular television serial Haara Kotiya. and 'Madhavee' in the serial Agni Piyapath.

== Personal life ==
Sandani completed her education at Negombo South International School and completed A/Ls.

== Career ==
About a month after the Haara Kotiya teledrama started, she went to study acting at 'Impas Acting and Performing Arts'. In 2018, she made her first music video appearance with the song Priyawee sung by Sirasa Superstar season 6 winner Piyath Rajapakse. After the success of the serial, she was selected to play a recurring role in the second season of the serial titled Kotipathiyo in 2018. In the same year, she acted in the serial Thuththiri, the first Sci-Fi Comedy Mega tele-drama in Sri Lanka. She played the supportive role of an alien called "Tia" in the serial. At the same time, she participated for the reality competition, 'Hiru Mega Stars'.

In 2017, she appeared in the music videos for the song "Yali Hamuwemu" sung by Nirosha Virajini and song "Saavi" by Iraj Weeraratne. In 2018, she made her maiden cinematic appearance with the film 1970 Love Story directed by Aruna Jayawardena. However, the film is yet to release. In 2019, she acted in two television serials: Crime Scene and Hiru Awidin. Then in 2020, she joined the cast of Agni Piyapath directed by Jayaprakash Sivagurunadan and written by Saddha Mangala Sooriyabandara. In the serial, Sandani played the lead role of 'Madhavee', wife of Manuranga, opposite to Saranga Disasekara and Shalani Tharaka. The serial later received popularity and critics acclaim. In 2019 she performed in Pandama by Dhanith Sri. The video later won the award for the Best Music video at Sumathi Awards

Apart from acting, she is also a television presenter currently hosting the musical program Handa Radi Peya telecast in Swarnavahini.

== Appeared Music Videos ==
- Priyawee – Piyath Rajapakse
- Ai Mama Adare – Piyath Rajapakse
- Yali Hamuwemu – Nirosha Virajini
- Saavi – Iraj Weeraratne
- Pandama – Dhanith Sri
- Adambarakaari – Roshan Fernando
- Bandimu Suda – Piyath Rajapakse
- Seedevi – Piyath Rajapakse

== Television series ==
| Year | Teledrama | Role | Ref. |
|---|---|---|---|
| 2017 | Haara Kotiya | Rashmi | |
| 2018 | Thuththiri | Tia | |
| 2018 | Kotipathiyo | Rashmi | |
| 2019 | Crime Scene | | |
| 2019 | Hiru Awidin | Samadhi | |
| 2020 | Agni Piyapath | Madhavee | |
| 2022 | Bandhana | Mayumi | |
| 2023 | Salli Pokuru | Nehara | |
| 2024 | Viseekari | Ishara | |

== Filmography ==
| Year | Film | Role | Ref. |
|---|---|---|---|
| 2024 | 1970 Love Story | Sherine | |
