= Imnainla Jamir =

Indian guitarist

- Born: 2002 (age 23–24); Mokokchung, Nagaland, India
- Other name: Aien
- Occupation: Guitarist
- Years active: 2018–present
- Musical career
- Origin: Kohima, Nagaland, India
- Genres: Rock; instrumental rock
- Instrument: Guitar

Imnainla Jamir (born 2002) is an Indian guitarist from Nagaland. She released her debut single "Bloom" in 2023.

== Early life ==
Imnainla Jamir was born in 2002 in Mokokchung, Nagaland to an Ao Naga family from Ungma. She developed an interest in music at an early age and began learning guitar as a child, initially under the guidance of her elder brother before becoming largely self-taught.

== Career ==
Jamir made her solo stage debut at the Hornbill International Music Festival at Agri Expo, Chümoukedima in 2018.

In December 2022, her electric guitar performance of the Indian national anthem during the opening ceremony of the Hornbill Festival received widespread attention online and in the national media.

In 2023, she released her debut instrumental single, "Bloom".

In 2026, Jamir became the first Indian woman to be officially endorsed by Ibanez, making her the company's first female Indian artist.

== Discography ==
=== Singles ===
- "Bloom" (2023)

=== Music videos ===
- "Bloom"

== Awards and nominations ==
Year	Award	Ref.
2023	H.E.R Award	
2025	National Youth Icon Award	
