= Puthandiya =

- Official DVD cover art
- Sinhala: පුතණ්ඩියා
- Directed by: Thrishula Deepa Thambawita
- Written by: Buddhika Jayarathne
- Produced by: Samantha Meella; Methsiri Kumarasinghe
- Starring: Jeevan Kumaratunga; Buddhika Jayarathne; Himali Siriwardena
- Cinematography: Thisula Deepa Thambawita
- Edited by: Praveen Jayarathna
- Music by: Sarath de Alwis
- Distributed by: E.A.P Films
- Release date: 22 July 2016
- Country: Sri Lanka
- Language: Sinhala

Puthandiya (Sinhala: පුතණ්ඩියා) is a 2016 Sri Lankan Sinhala action thriller film directed by Thrishula Deepa Thambawita and co-produced by Samantha Meella and Methsiri Kumarasinghe. It stars Jeevan Kumaratunga, Buddhika Jayaratne, and Himali Siriwardena in lead roles along with Nehara Peiris and Dharmapriya Dias. Music composed by Sarath de Alwis. It is the 971st Sri Lankan film in the Sinhala cinema.

== Cast ==
- Jeevan Kumaratunga as Dharmaratne aka "Dharme"
- Buddhika Jayaratne as Vimukthi Dharmaratne
- Himali Siriwardena as Veena
- Nehara Peiris as Samanmalee
- Dharmapriya Dias as Ajith
- Arjuna Kamalanath as Podde
- Nihal Fernando as Sirisoma
- Wasantha Wittachchi as Bandarathilake
- Duleeka Marapana as Ajith's mother
- Jayani Senanayake as Dharme's wife
- Dhananjaya Siriwardena as Kapila
- Chathura Perera as Mohammad
- Sarath Dikkumbura as Upendra
- Udaya Shantha Liyanage as Raju
- Menaka Rajapakse as himself in cameo appearance

== Soundtrack ==
No.	Title	Lyrics	Singer(s)	Length
1.	"Maga Hariya Nowe"	Kelum Srimal	Amarasiri Peiris
2.	"Nida Nonida"	Kelum Srimal	Amarasiri Peiris
