= Hyacinth Wijeratne =

Sri Lankan actress (1946–2021)

- හයසින්ත් විජේරත්න
- Born: Threeris Hyacinth Wijeratne; 3 October 1946; Modara, British Ceylon
- Died: 30 July 2021 (aged 74); Lindula, Sri Lanka
- Education: Mary Margaret College, Modara
- Occupation: Actress
- Years active: 1977–2021
- Spouse: Ivan Wijeratne
- Children: 1

Threeris Hyacinth Wijeratne (Sinhala: හයසින්ත් විජේරත්න; 3 October 1946 – 31 July 2021) was an actress in Sri Lankan cinema, theatre and television. In a career spanned more than four decades, she was known for her breakthrough roles in Karumakkarayo, Tharaka Mal and Ho Gaana Pokuna.

== Personal life ==
Hyacinth Wijeratne was born on 3 October 1946 in Modara, Sri Lanka, as the third child of the family. She was educated at Mary Margaret College, Modara (currently known as St. Anthony's College). She later attended St. James' College, Modara for further studies. She had two older sisters, one younger brother and one younger sister. When she was about 15 or 16 years old, she and her younger sister Niluka drowned in Kala Oya where Niluka died by the incident and Hyacinth narrowly escaped.

She was married to Ivan Wijeratne and the couple had one son, Shirash Wijeratne. Her husband Ivan died in 2019.

== Career ==
She applied for a newspaper advertisement about hiring new actors for a film. Without hesitation, Hyacinth, who also screened the film, got the sub-lead role in the film Pembara Madhu directed by Sugathapala Senarath Yapa in 1977. However her husband did not allow her to act in the film. Later under the assistance from her mother-in-law, she acted in the film. Since then she has had the opportunity to appear in several films including: Ekṭæm Gē, Surabidena, Hita Honda Gæhæniyak, Ekadā Væhi, Kristhu Charitaya, Thārakā Mal, Hō Gānā Pokuṇa, Guru Geethaya, Appata Siri and Siri Daḷadāgamanaya.

In late 1980s, she got the opportunity to play the role of "Udukinda Menike" for the first teledrama made in Sri Lanka, Dimuthu Muthu directed by D. B. Nihalsinghe. Since then she made several motherly role in televisions screen for the serials: Daḍabima, Isuru Gira, Kande Gedara, Sankrānti Samaya, Piṭagamkārayō, Brahma Mūhurthaya, Batti, Vīdi Pahan, Sasara Sakmana, Sath Piyavaru, Urumayaka Aragalaya, Senuri, Ilandāri Hændǣva, Emy, Podu and Daskon. Hyacinth last starred in the teledrama Divithura where she played the role of Surya Dayaruwan's granny.

== Death ==
She died on 30 July 2021 at the age of 74 after succumbing to severe injuries during a fatal road accident at Lindula, Thalawakala. She was reportedly shooting for the television soap opera Divithura in Nuwara Eliya and met with the accident when she was returning to Colombo. The driver of the van who was identified as the main suspect had been arrested following the accident.

Her remains were laid to rest at No. 25/10, Mabola, Kattiyawatta, Wattala in her residence and the last rites were performed at 5 pm on 4 August 2021 at the Mabola Roman Catholic Cemetery.

== Filmography ==
Year	Film	Role	Ref.
1977	Pembara Madu		
1980	Karumakkarayo		
1980	Ektam Ge		
1990	Christhu Charithaya	Anna	
1993	Surabi Dena		
1994	Ekada Wahi		
1996	Hitha Honda Gahaniyak		
2000	Undaya	Deva's mother	
2007	Tharaka Mal	Parwathi	
2009	Kanyavi	Janaka's mother	
2014	Siri Daladagamanaya		
2015	Ho Gaana Pokuna	Principal's wife	
2015	Guru Geethaya		
2015	Anagarika Dharmapala Srimathano	Mallika Dharmagunawardhana	
2016	Deveni Warama		
2017	Appata Siri	Rathnawathi Alapatha Kumarihami	
2020	Suparna		
TBD	Visangamanaya	Jagath's mother	

== See also ==
- List of Sri Lankan actors
