= Raigam Tele'es Most Admired Actress =

Janagatha award for Most Admired Actress is presented annually for the Most Popular Actress among Most Popular Female celebrities in Sri Lanka. The Janagatha award is considered a people’s choice award that determines the fan and general public choice based on mass media reach and published viewership ratings. The island-wide research study is conducted under the supervision of Emeritus Prof. Laxman Dissanayake of University of Colombo. The final five nominees are usually actresses who have won the Best Actress, Most Popular Actress or the Most Popular actress based on audience and social media research.

Unlike the "Most Popular" awards determined by SMS polls, Janagatha awards are selected based on an island-wide research and scientific methodology to evaluate authentic viewership and popularity. The survey is being conducted by more than 400 surveyors equipped with GPS technology, covering more than 120,000 stores spread across 110 jurisdictions, covering more than 1,500 main and secondary roads in Sri Lanka, and surveying a sample of over 35,000 respondents. The survey captures the highest public attention, strengthening the connection between the television industry and the general public.

The nominees for the Most Admired Actress of the year 2024 were Michelle Dilhara, Piyumali Edirisinghe, Dusheni Miyurangi, Shalani Tharaka and Dinakshie Priyasad. Michelle Dilhara won the Most Admired Actress of the year 2024 award. The nominees for the Most Admired Actress of the year 2025 were Dinakshie Priyasad, Dusheni Miyurangi, Shalani Tharaka, Tharindi Fernando and Michelle Dilhara. Michelle Dilhara won the Most Admired Actress of the year 2025 award for the second consecutive year.

== Award list in each year ==
Year	Award Winner	ref
2024	Michelle Dilhara	
2025	Michelle Dilhara	
