= Michelle Dilhara =

Sri Lankan actress and philanthropist

- Michelle in 2026
- Born: Hatharasinghege Michelle Dilhara; 1 May 1996 (age 30); Ragama, Sri Lanka
- Education: Negombo South International School; Newstead Girls College
- Occupations: Actress, environmental activist, author, social activist, philanthropist
- Years active: 2016-present
- Height: 5 ft 5 in (165 cm)
- Parents: H. Premawardena (father); E. Jean Stella Fernando (mother)
- Awards: Most Popular Actress; Best Upcoming Actress
- Website: michelledilhara.lk

Hatharasinghege Michelle Dilhara (Sinhala: මිෂෙල් දිල්හාරා; born 1 May 1996) is a Sri Lankan actress and environmentalist. One of the most popular television actresses in Sri Lanka, Dilhara is best known for playing the role of Ayoma in the television series Sudu Andagena Kalu Awidin Apart from acting, she also engages in various philanthropic activities and is a social activist and an author.

In 2019 Dilhara received the National Youth Icon Award at the World Youth Summit held in New Delhi, India for her book Social Invisibility is not a Fiction, it Exists and for her "Theory of Alternative Social Cogwheel". In 2020 Dilhara won the Best Upcoming Actress award at the Raigam Tele'es awards ceremony for her role in the critically acclaimed serial Sudu Andagena Kalu Awidin. For the same role, she also won the Best Upcoming Actress award at the 2019 Sumathi Awards, as well as won the 15th Sri Lankan Television State Awards in 2021.

In 2020, Dilhara was nominated as the Best Actress at the 26th Sumathi Awards for her role as Mahimi in the television series Can You Hear Me. In 2021, she was nominated as the Best Supporting Actress at the Raigam Tele'es awards ceremony for the television series Pork Veediya and then nominated as the Best Supporting Actress at the Sumathi Awards for the serial Podu season 2. In 2022, she was once again nominated for the best Supporting Actress award at the Raigam Tele'es for the serial Lokaa. In 2024 and 2025, she won the Most Popular Teledrama Actress of the Youth Award at the Popular Awards. In 2025, Dilhara won the Most Popular Teledrama Actress award at the Pinnacle Awards and then won the award for Raigam Tele'es Most Admired Actress in the consecutive years of 2024 and 2025.

Currently, she performs her role as the Earth Day Network Ambassador for Sri Lanka. She is also an advocate and promoter of Net zero and Carbon neutrality. She collaborated with the Korean Ambassador Santhuth Woonjin Jeong to create a framework to implement Sustainable Development Goal 13, the net zero initiative within the Korean Embassy in Sri Lanka.

== Personal life ==
She was born on 1 May 1996 in Ragama as the eldest of three siblings. She has two younger sisters: Mishen Prasadika and Rochelle Fiona. Her father, Hatharasinghege Premawardena, is a businessman and her mother, E. Jean Stella Fernando, is a housewife. She started her education from Negombo South International School and then moved to Newstead Girls College, Negombo for G.C.E O/L and A/L.

During school times, at the age of 11, Dilhara started practicing martial arts and Karate-do-Shitokai under Sensei Rohan P. Udayakumara. Meanwhile, she also participated in several local and international Karate championships and won several medals. In 2010, she won the gold medal at the 2nd International Gōjū-ryū Karate Open Championship.

Dilhara is currently studying for an External Degree in IT and the Higher National Diploma in Psychology. She is also following a course on Nurturing Care Framework for Early Childhood Development under the Senior Lecturer Duminda Guruge, at the Rajarata University of Sri Lanka.

== Acting career ==
Dilhara was a member of the school's drama team where she started to act on the school stage on several occasions. After completing the A/L examination, she joined Abhina Academy conducted by veteran artist Anoja Weerasinghe in July 2016. According to Dilhara, Weerasinghe was her first mentor in acting, where she learned yoga as well as voice controlling and facial expressions. Later in October 2016, she joined Damayanthi Fonseka's acting Academy for further knowledge based on emotional balancing and character adaptation in drama. Then she joined Abhiranga Art Center Negombo, conducted by Randika Wimalasooriya in June 2017 to further learn Drama and Theater. During this period, she got the opportunity to study art from the Indian Theater Director, Ujjwal Singha

=== Television ===
In 2016, Dilhara made her first teledrama appearance in Dedunnai Adare directed by Saranga Mendis. Then she acted in the popular television serial Salsapuna directed by Nalan Mendis and telecasted on Sirasa TV, which made her breakthrough in the acting career. She was selected for the role "Preethiwa" popularly known as "Podi Paththarakari" by Sandhya Mendis, Chairman of Susila Productions. Even though the character was introduced in the middle of the serial, it was highly popularized among the public. During the same period, she then appeared with the leading role in the first Mobile drama Dhara, produced by Susila Productions.

In 2017, Dilhara was selected to the television serial Poori directed by Ranil Kulasinghe, which was telecasted on Independent Television Network. In the serial, she played the role of a village girl named Maali. In the same year, she was cast for the fantasy teledrama Bodhi, directed by Sanjaya Nirmal. It was telecasted on Sirasa TV, where Dilhara played the role "Goddess Kali". In late 2017, she appeared in the serial Emy as the titular character "Emy". It was directed by Sanjaya Nirmal and telecasted on ITN. Her character was highly popularized.

In 2018, she acted in the popular serial Sidu telecasted on TV Derana and directed by Thilina Boralessa. She acted as the "daylight angel", who helped and protected Sidu during his journey with the little monk Soratha. During the same period, she acted in the science fiction television serial Thuththiri, with the role "Urmila" directed by Sanjaya Nirmal. The drama is also considered to be the first Sifi comedy mega drama in Sri Lanka.

In 2019, Dilhara acted in several television serials across many genres. She acted in the popular serial Sudu Andagena Kalu Awidin aired in Sri Lanka Rupavahini Corporation, directed by Sunil Costa. The serial was critically acclaimed and won several awards at local television award festivals. In the serial, Dilhara played the role of "Ayoma", who is a teenage girl facing the hardships of life. This marked her first major role in the television screen, winning three Best Upcoming Actress awards at the Raigam Tele'es and State Television Awards. Later she acted in the serial Haratha Hera directed by Chandika Wijayasena. She played the role of a wealthy girl named Pabasara. Later she acted in the serial Haratha Hera and played the role of a wealthy girl named "Pabasara".

In mid-2019, she portrayed the character "Kaweesha" in the television series Dadayam Bambaru directed by Sanjaya Nirmal, which was aired in Swarnavahini. Later during same the year, she acted in the television serial Kisa, which was her second main role, directed by Nimal Rathnayake. Then she was cast for the serial Sihina Kumari directed by Roshan Weerasinghe where Dilhara played a dual character of two sisters, "Amaya and Himaya". In 2020, she started to act in the comedy thriller serial Sihina Samagama which is currently aired on Swarnavahini.

In October 2020, she appeared in another thriller serial Can You Hear Me aired on National Television. She played the role of a young teenage girl named "Mahimi". She was nominated as the Best Actress at the 26th Sumathi Awards for the performance in Can You Here Me. The series is the first-ever attempt to take Sri Lankan teledrama to international audience via social media where it is airing with English subtitles. In 2021, Dilhara was cast for the role "Chenugi" in the serial Pork Street where she portrayed the character of a middle-class girl who was struggling financially with her husband. This role earned her a nomination for the Best Supporting Actress at the 2021 Raigam Tele Awards. During the same year she appeared as Dewani in the television series Race, which was aired on Siyatha TV.

In 2022, Dilhara was cast for the character Dushi in the popular TV series Podu Season 2 which was aired on TV Derana. The TV series was directed by Sharmila Dharmarasa. Dilhara portrayed the character of a wealthy teenage girl who was in the middle of a love triangle. During the same year, she appeared in the television series Looka which was directed by Jayaprakash Sivagurunathan. The TV series was aired in the Independent Television Network. Dilhara portrayed the character "Navya" and her performance in Looka earned her a nomination for the Best Supporting Actress at the 19th Raigam Tele Awards.

In 2023, Dilhara was cast for the television series Kaasi, directed by Iresh Lokubandara aired on Sri Lanka Rupavahini Corporation. She portrays the character Sagarika, a middle-class girl who is forced by her parents to marry a man who is twice her age as solution for their financial issues. In the same year, she was selected for the role Malki in the serial Sidadiye Samanaliyo directed by popular actor Dhananjaya Siriwardena. In the consecutive years of 2025 and 2026, she won the Award for the Most Popular Teledrama Actress of the Youth at the Popular Awards. In 2026, she also won the award for the most popular on screen couple of the year with Chathuranga Kodithuwakku.

=== Film ===
Dilhara made her film debut in the 2018 sports film, Udumabara, as a supporting role, that of "Michelle", a talented athlete who competed against the lead character.

== Beyond acting ==
Apart from acting, she was also involved in several television commercials including popular the Maliban tea advertisements in 2017 and 2018. Later in 2018, she hosted the musical program 16+ telecasted on Sirasa TV.

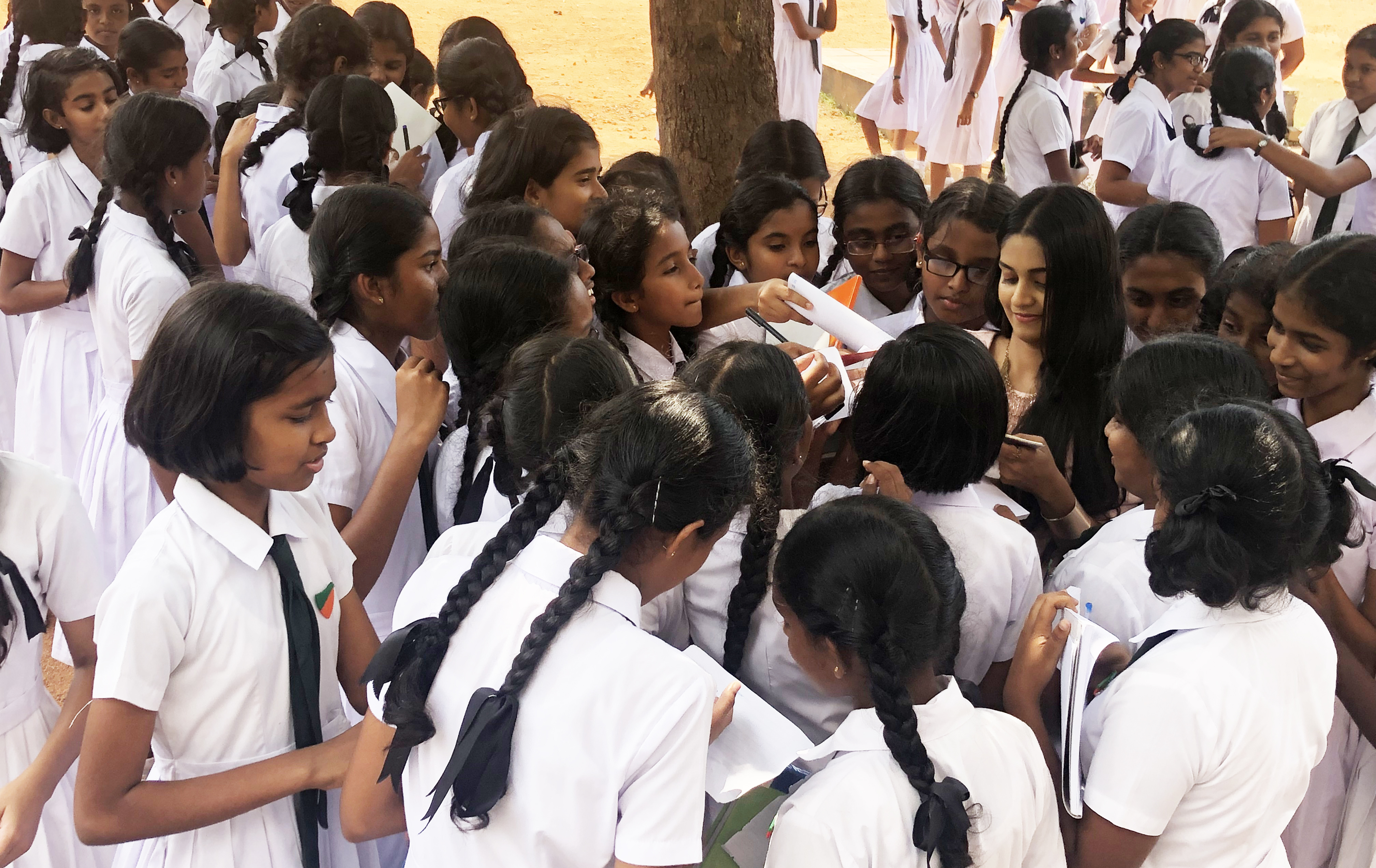
Dilhara with school kids

In 2019, she hosted the entertainment program Weekend Vinode along with Udith Abeyrathne and Rukshana Dissanayake which aired every Saturday on Swarnawahini. In 2018, she acted in the music video Hitha Mage Nokiyama sung by a newcomer Dilani Kasthuriarachchi. In 2019, she acted in Nilan Hettiarachchi's music video Adara Belman. She also collaborated for the music video Umathu Prema Kumara sung by Sashika Nisansala in 2019.

In 2020, she acted in the music video Nethra along with Damitha Abeyratne. The song was voiced by Abhisheka Wimalaweera and dedicated for the Mother's Day.

=== Author work ===
In 2019, Dilhara wrote the book “Social Invisibility is not a Fiction it Exists” after a four years’ research with emeritus Professor Antonette Perera, Dr. Parakrama Warnasuriya and Dr. Shiromi Fernando. The book explains about the people affected by social invisibility due to race, negligence, discrimination, age and language barrier, and how to minimize social invisibility and social exclusion. In 2019 received the National Youth Icon Award for her book at the World Youth Summit held in New Delhi, India.

=== Music career ===
In October 2023, Dilhara made her singing debut with the film theme song "Mini Meulen" in the film Sri Wickrama directed by Mohan Niyaz. The song was written by Nilar N. Cassim and was composed by Dinesh Subasinghe.

== Philanthropy ==
=== The invisible to visible movement ===
Since 15 years of age, Dilhara wanted to be a humanitarian. She started to conduct free English scholarship programs for the financially challenged students in Sri Lanka with the support of the English lecturer Danushka Clark. In 2013, she completed the Japanese Language Proficiency Test as well. In 2018, Dilhara initiated "The invisible to visible movement" for the people who are affected by social invisibility and social exclusion. Started with 200 students in Divulapitiya town, the program has now grown up to 1000 students eventually. The scholarship program was initiated as a sub-project of The Invisible to Visible movement. The project was highly praised by the people island wide which enhances them to develop their communication skills with the world and to create a path for them to approach the international job market through online jobs.

In 2020, Dilhara founded the community center called Senehas Arana for the retired citizens who are affected by Social invisibility and Social exclusion in Divulapitiya area. With the community center, she released her first theory "The Theory of Alternative Social Cogwheel", which is a sociological theory of how people are affected due to factors such as the elderly, people with a disability, educational status, barriers for senior citizens in getting new jobs, discrimination, and violence.

== Environmental activism ==
In 2016, Dilhara organized a campaign with Manusha D. Navarathna, an active environmental activist, to reduce Environmental Degradation concerning climate change. The campaign was taken place at the Negombo beach premises for three consecutive days from 26 to 28 February 2016 to remove all the plastic objects that were circling on the beach. In May 2017, she organized a campaign for her 22nd birthday to change the focus of the youngsters to support the poor to stand on their feet rather than wasting time on video games. During her campaign, she along with many youngsters collected more than one thousand kilos of rice and gave them to the needy families in Pinnakalewattha village. Later in August during the same year, she along with Navarathna organized another project to plant 1000 trees as a solution to minimize the ongoing climate crisis that has taken place due to global warming and climate change. The trees were planted in Katana, Gampaha district of Sri Lanka.

In January 2020, Dilhara conducted multiple awareness programs on climate change and social invisibility in universities, schools, newspapers, and television programs. In July 2020, Dilhara organized a three-day climate change camp for children, youngsters and teenagers along with Navarathna and Clark. The initiative encompasses involving the youth to restore the earth and make a better place to live in the future. The camp included activities to reduce the Environmental Degradation and organized beach cleanups, awareness programs, and campaigns like planting trees.

On 7 March 2021, she conducted an awareness program on Climate Change and Global Warming at the GreenCon 2021 event which was organized by the Interact Club of Wycherley International School where the event was held at the Cinnamon Grand Colombo. Meanwhile, on 29 April 2021, she conducted an awareness program on Food Wastage and Its Impacts on Environmental Pollution collaborating with Food For All Kadamandiya Food Bank. She mainly focused on raising awareness of reducing food wastage which is a large contribution towards climate change and global warming and how to achieve the Sustainable Development Goal 2: Zero Hunger by saving food that is wasted.

"Social Invisibility is not a fiction it exists"

— Michelle Dilhara quotes

In September 2023, Dilhara was invited by the Temple of the Tooth Media and Special Projects Bureau, to deliver a speech about the historical value of Temple of the Tooth for the World Tourism Day. The event was held in Temple of the Tooth premises with the participation of 50 delegates from 20 countries. During the program, she received the opportunity to planting a tree in the Temple of the Tooth premises.

=== University collaborations ===
Dilhara conducted an awareness program on Climate Change and Social Invisibility at the Rajarata University of Sri Lanka with Najith Guruge, Senior Lecturer of the Department of Health Promotion. The awareness program was conducted for the undergraduates in Faculty of Applied Sciences.

On 2 July 2020, she conducted another awareness program along with the senior lecturer Department of Accountancy and Finance Rasika Devundara at Sabaragamuwa University of Sri Lanka. The program was based on Climate Change and Personality Development and was conducted for the students of the Faculty of Management Studies. The awareness program was conducted to make the students aware of the impacts of climate change as well as how to develop their personality and self-confidence as university students.

On 6 April 2021, Dilhara collaborated with Uva Wellassa University and organized a tree planting program in the university premises along with an awareness program. The program was initiated by the Career Guidance Unit Director Dr. Janaka Siyambalapitiya and Career Guidance Unit Councellor, Akila Aushada Bandara. The main focus of the event was to encourage the university for the fight towards climate change and global warming. On 21 March 2021, she joined with University of Peradeniya and distributed rice bags and dry rations to elder homes that didn't receive food due to the prevailing COVID-19 pandemic in Sri Lanka.

Dilhara organized a tree planting program with University of Sri Jayewardenepura on 12 March 2021. Six different types of trees were planted in the university premises during the program. Dilhara also held an awareness program to the participants during the event as to how university students can contribute towards minimizing climate change and global warming. On 28 February 2021, she conducted a lecture on climate change "Hear Earth" which was organized by AIESEC in University of Moratuwa. The program was presented with the aim of raising awareness on minimizing climate change, global warming, and pollution.

On 8 June 2021, Dilhara conducted an awareness program on Ecosystem Restoration at the University of Colombo along with Senior Professor Chandrika Wijerathna – Vice Chancellor, Professor Erandathie Lokupitiya, and Professor Siril Wijesundara. On the 12 September 2021, she conducted an awareness program on Deforestation and Global Warming at the University of Jaffna. In December 2022, Dilhara collaborated with the Wayamba University of Sri Lanka and launched the “Tree for Life” society, followed by an awareness program and a tree plantation program.

She collaborated with the IEEE WIE Student Branch affinity Group of General Sir John Kotelawala Defence University and conducted the program "EmpowHer" along with Professor Wasana Maithree Herath. The conference was organized with regard to celebrating International Women's Day on 8 March 2021.

== International collaborations ==
=== South Asian Youth Summit ===
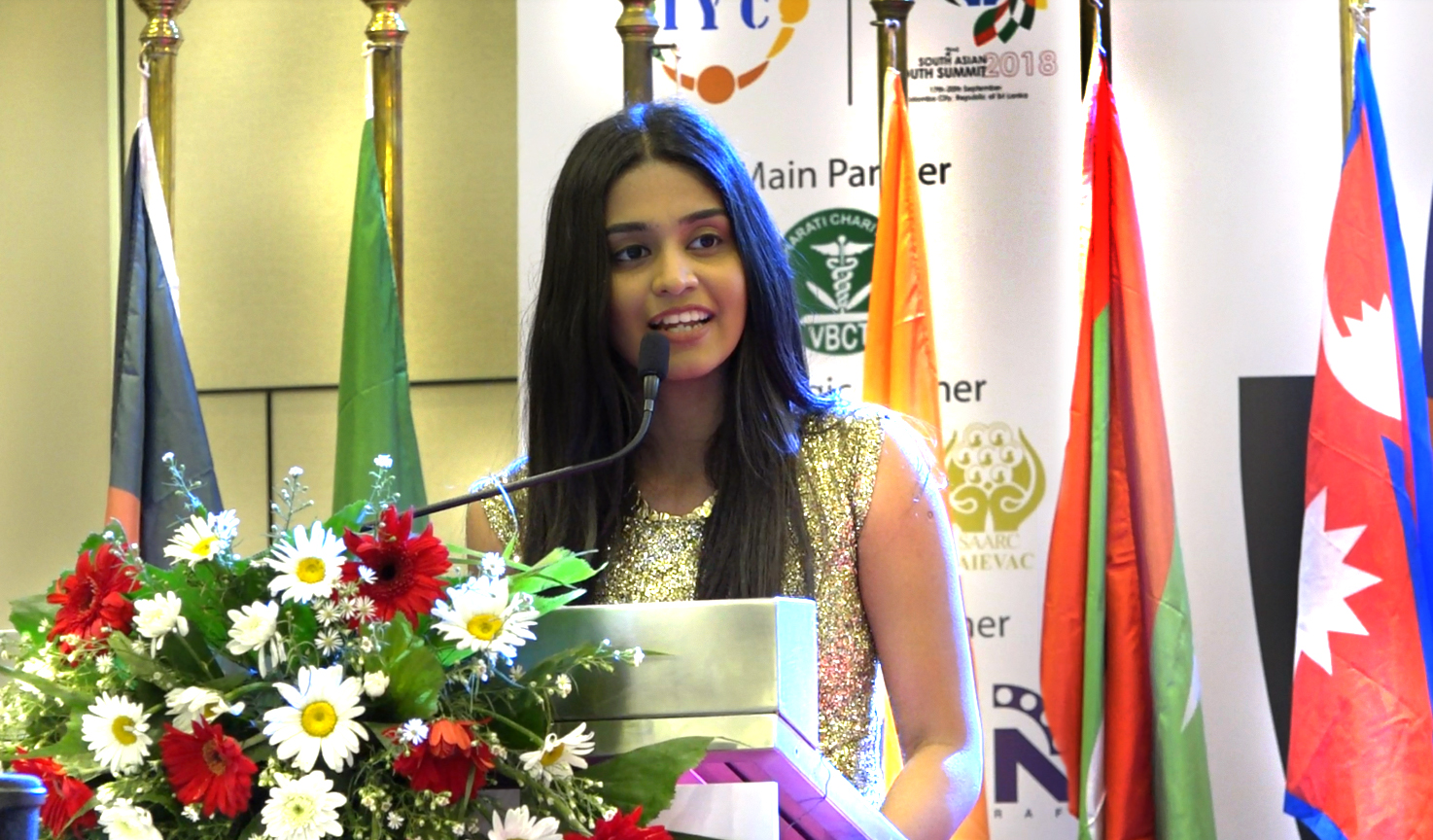
Dilhara addressing the gathering at the South Asian Youth Summit 2018

In November 2018, Dilhara was the official host for the 2nd South Asian Youth Summit held in Sri Lanka. The event taken place with the participation of SAARC observer nation and personalities from across Asia. During the event, she won the "Asia Inspiration Award" 2018 for her contribution towards the South Asian philanthropy.

=== World Youth Summit ===
In November 2019, she hosted the World Youth Summit which was held in New Delhi, India.

=== Earth Day Network ===
On 22 April 2020, Dilhara was invited by the Earth Day Network to feature in their My Future My Voice campaign. As the world's largest recruiter to the environmental movement, the campaign was an environment platform for the youth to “Restore our earth”. She featured along with 50 other youths from around 17 countries on the 50th anniversary of Earth Day, where she addressed the meeting on how to reduce the carbon footprint, aim for zero waste, development of renewable energy, reduce greenhouse gas emissions, save natural resources and educate the less fortunate. The event witnessed the participation of renowned global personalities including Pope Francis, Denis Hayes, Albert II, Prince of Monaco, Al Gore, Patricia Espinosa, John Kerry, Zac Efron and Anil Kapoor.

Meanwhile, on 11 May 2020, she was appointed as the Earth Day Network Ambassador to Sri Lanka.

=== International Rain Day ===
On July 29, Dilhara participated in the World Rain Day virtual fest which was organized by the Earth Day Network. She featured with other celebrity Earth Day Network ambassadors such as British Indian musician and composer Soumik Datta, Thai actor Alex Rendell, Bombay Jayashri Ramnath, Indian classical vocalist Kaushiki Chakraborty, Indian composer Ricky Kej, Sonam Wangchuk and Filipino actor Dingdong Dantes.

=== Korean embassy ===
On 1 July 2021, she collaborated with the Korean Ambassador of Sri Lanka, Santhush Woonjin Jeong, and initiated the 'Go Green Embassy' program. The program was initiated with the aim of converting the Embassy to a Green Embassy thereby achieving Carbon Neutrality and net-zero with respect to the P4G Seoul summit. During the program, a Mesua ferrea tree was planted at the Embassy premises symbolizing the Sri Lanka Korea friendship.

On 14 May 2022, Dilhara was invited as a guest speaker by the Korean Ambassador of Sri Lanka, Santhush Woonjin Jeong to the opening ceremony of “Korea Week 2022” which was held at the Colombo City Centre. The event was launched by the Korean Embassy in Sri Lanka in commemoration of the 45th anniversary of diplomatic relations between Korea and Sri Lanka. Veteran actor Ravindra Randeniya, several Ambassadors and other representatives from Korea participated in the event.

=== ICSE Global Conference ===
On the 9 September 2022, Dilhara was invited as a delegate and speaker for the 4th ICSE Global Conference which was held in New Delhi, India with the participation of 50 representatives from 50 countries including UNICEF, UNESCO, UNEP and WWF. She addressed the gathering regarding Climate Literacy and Sustainable Education. The summit was organized by Dr. Ram Boojh, the chief executive officer of Mobius Foundation, India.

=== Delhi University ===
In September 2023, she collaborated with Delhi University and organized a tree planting project at the university premises along with an awareness program conducted for third year students of the Environmental Department. Later she was invited by Ramanujan College, a constituent college of University of Delhi's South Campus. She delivered a lecture on Sustainable Environment for the final year students of the Environmental Department.

=== United Nations Biodiversity Conference (COP17) – "We Need Heroes, Not Followers" ===
In 2026, Dilhara delivered a speech titled "We Need Heroes, Not Followers" at the 2026 United Nations Biodiversity Conference (COP17) – the 17th meeting of the Conference of the Parties to the Convention on Biological Diversity – held in Yerevan, Armenia.

In the speech, she warned that humanity had the power to "build cities, conquer the oceans, and reach beyond the stars", but questioned "what is the meaning of all our greatness if we cannot protect the very planet that gave us life?" She referred to disappearing forests, suffering oceans, and species that had existed for millions of years vanishing, and urged the audience to be remembered "not as the generation that stood silently and witnessed extinction, but as the generation that stood against it".

The speech was widely circulated on Instagram, Facebook and X, particularly among youth and Gen Z audiences, with more than 1,000 reaction / repost videos reported to have been shared. According to the syndicated press-release reports, the clip received 296,000 shares, 686,327 reactions and over 51,000 comments, and reached audiences in more than 75 countries.

COP17 itself brought together representatives of 196 Parties to the Convention on Biological Diversity, comprising 195 countries and the European Union, for the first global review of collective progress toward the Kunming-Montreal Global Biodiversity Framework.

== Filmography ==
| Year | Film | Role | Ref. |
|---|---|---|---|
| 2018 | Udumbara | Michelle | |
| 2024 | Solo Town | Ama | |
| 2025 | Adhiran | Kaveetha | |

=== Television serials ===
- Ayachana
- Bodhi
- Can You Hear Me
- Crime Scene
- Dadayam Bambaru
- Dankuda Banda
- Dedunnai Adare
- Emy
- Haratha Hera
- Kaasi
- Kanthoru Moru
- Kisa
- Lalai Lilai Lai
- Lokaa
- Mati Kadulu
- Meesha
- Podu 2
- Poori
- Pork Veediya
- Rasa Rahasak
- Ron Soya
- Rosa Wedillak
- Salsapuna
- Sidadiye Samanaliyo
- Sidu
- Sihina Samagama
- Siri
- Sudu Andagena Kalu Awidin
- Taxikaraya
- Thuththiri

== Awards ==
Dilhara has won several awards at international and local award festivals including, the South Asian Youth Summit and World Youth Summit. She also received an award from the Minister of Youth and Sports government of Malaysia, Mr.Syed Saddiq.

=== Abdul Kalam Memorial Excellence Awards ===
| Year | Nominee / work | Award | Result |
|---|---|---|---|
| 2019 | Philanthropy | Youth Peace Ambassador | Won |

=== Raigam Tele’es ===
| Year | Nominee / work | Award | Result |
|---|---|---|---|
| 2020 | Sudu Andagena Kalu Awidin | Best Upcoming Actress | Won |
| 2020 | Sudu Andagena Kalu Awidin | Most Popular Actress | Nominated |
| 2021 | Pork Weediya | Best Supporting Actress | Nominated |
| 2021 | Can You Hear Me | Most Popular Actress | Nominated |
| 2022 | Looka | Best Supporting Actress | Nominated |
| 2024 | Audience Research | Most Admired actress of the year | Won |

=== Sumathi Awards ===
| Year | Nominee / work | Award | Result |
|---|---|---|---|
| 2020 | Sudu Andagena Kalu Awidin | Most Popular Actress | Nominated |
| 2020 | Sudu Andagena Kalu Awidin | Best Upcoming Actress | Won |
| 2021 | Can You Hear Me? | Best Actress | Nominated |
| 2023 | Podu Season 2 | Best Supporting Actress | Nominated |
| 2024 | Ron soya | Most Popular Actress | Nominated |

=== State Television Awards ===
| Year | Nominee / work | Award | Result |
|---|---|---|---|
| 2020 | Sudu Andagena Kalu Awidin | Merit Award | Won |

=== Popular Awards ===
| Year | Nominee / work | Award | Result |
|---|---|---|---|
| 2024 | Lalai Lilai Lai | Most Popular Teledrama Actress of the Youth | Won |
| 2025 | Ron Soya | Most Popular Teledrama Actress of the Youth | Won |
| 2026 | Ron Soya | Most Popular Teledrama Actress of the Youth | Won |
| 2026 | Ron Soya | Most Popular On-Screen Couple | Won |

Special Awards

- In 2018 Dilhara won the Asia Inspiration Award at the South Asian Youth Summit for her contribution towards Social invisibility
- In 2019 she won the National Youth Icon Award at the World Youth Summit for Philanthropy.

== See also ==
- List of Sri Lankan actors
- List of philanthropists
