= Daruwane =

2012 film

- Sinhala: දරුවනේ
- Directed by: V. Sivadasan
- Written by: Bernard Jayathunga
- Produced by: Sunil T. Films
- Starring: Shayan Perera; Jayalath Manoratne; Janaka Kumbukage; Duleeka Marapana
- Cinematography: Norbert Rathnasiri
- Edited by: Randika Nadeeshan Vijemanna
- Music by: Somapala Rathnayake
- Distributed by: E.A.P Films
- Release date: 26 July 2012
- Running time: 110 minutes
- Country: Sri Lanka
- Language: Sinhala

Daruwane (Sinhala: දරුවනේ) is a 2012 Sri Lankan Sinhala children's family drama film directed by V. Sivadasan and produced by Sunil T. Fernando for Sunil T. Films. It stars Jayalath Manoratne, Janaka Kumbukage, and Duleeka Marapana in lead roles along with Nadeeka Gunasekara and Vishwanath Kodikara. Music composed by Somapala Rathnayake. It is the 1176th Sri Lankan film in the Sinhala cinema. The film is a remake of 2009 Tamil film Pasanga.

== Plot ==
Samarasekara who is a newcomer to village, enrolls his children to a village school. His neighbour, Vajirasena is the class teacher of Samarasekara's son, Rakshita. Rakshita becomes the favourite among other students. Vajirasena's son, Diluka, who is also Rakshita's classmate, gets jealous at him. He has two friends, Nadeeka and Ukkuwa and tries to defeat Rakshita, but in vain. Later, they plan to attack him, but their classmate, Charuni overhears them and confronts them. Unexpectedly, Rakshita meets with an accident and Diluka helps to hospitalize him. In the hospital, Rakshita recovers with the Diluka's courageous. Finally, Diluka realizes his mistakes and befriends with Rakshita.

== Cast ==
- Jayalath Manoratne as Vajirasena Ahangama
- Janaka Kumbukage as Samarasekara
- Duleeka Marapana as Anjula Samarasekara
- Nadeeka Gunasekara as Vishaka Ahangama
- Vishwanath Kodikara as Priyantha
- Thisuri Yuwanika as Dulani Ahangama
- Wijeratne Warakagoda as Anjula's Father
- Palitha Silva as Doctor

=== Child Artists ===
- Shayan Perera as Rakshitha Samarasekara (Ricky)
- Yohan Perera as Diluka Ahangama
- Trishuna Perera as Saman
- Duruthu Abhishek as Kalpa Dissanayake
- Rachini Viranga as Charuni
- Kokila Jayasuriya as Nadeeka
- Chanka Madushan as Ukkuwa

== Soundtrack ==
No.	Title	Singer(s)	Length
1.	"Me Mulu Ahasema"	Nanda Malini
2.	"Senehase Aruna"	Rookantha Gunathilake, Suranji Shyamali
3.	"Dedunne Pata Aran"	Ravindu Lakshan, Maneesha Chanchala, Sareen de Mel, Chanaka Madushan, Sanjani de Mel
