= Viyasiduru =

- Sinhala: වියසිදුරු
- Directed by: Prabhath Agampodi
- Written by: Prabhath Agampodi
- Produced by: University of Kelaniya
- Starring: Kalana Gunasekara; Shalani Tharaka; Lakshman Mendis; Thumindu Dodantenna
- Cinematography: Susantha Mahagalgamuwa
- Edited by: Chalana Wimalasuriya; Prabath Agampodi
- Music by: Milinda Tennakoon
- Release date: 23 March 2023
- Running time: 90 minutes
- Country: Sri Lanka
- Language: Sinhala

Viyasiduru (Sinhala: වියසිදුරු; lit. 'Miracle of the Light and Darkness'), is a 2023 Sri Lankan Sinhala crime romantic thriller film directed by Prabhath Agampodi in his directorial debut and produced by Piyumi Agampodi under Kaputa Productions for the University of Kelaniya. It stars Kalana Gunasekara, and Shalani Tharaka in lead roles along with Lakshman Mendis, Thumindu Dodantenna, Dharmapriya Dias in supportive roles.

It is the first Sri Lankan narrative feature film produced by a university which is produced by Kelaniya University under Centre for Brand Image Development (CBID). The film received positive reviews from critics and won several awards globally.

== Plot ==
The film story revolves around a couple of lovers who have to face a complex series of events after a coincidence.

== Cast ==
- Kalana Gunasekara as Hirantha
- Shalani Tharaka as Taniya
- Lakshman Mendis as Retired Army Officer
- Thumindu Dodantenna as Inspector Alwis
- Dharmapriya Dias as Driver
- Sanjeewa Dissanayake as Velu
- Chatura Prabhat as Youth boy
- Sanjiva Dissanayake as Helper
- Krishan Madhusanka
- Suranga Dissanayake

== Production ==
The film is directed and screenplay by Prabhath Agampodi, who is a Senior lecturer in the Department of Fine Arts in University of Kelaniya and Coordinator of the Diploma in Film and Television. The production crew is mainly consist with undergraduates of the university who study degree in film and television including: Angela Kuruppu, Kamal Kitsiri Liyanage, Chandrasiri Bogamuwa, Chatura Prabhat, Suranga Dissanayake, Ranga Senaratne, Darshika Fonseka, Krishan Madhusankha, Sarath Kumarasiri, Darshan Nuwan, Kasun Sanjana, Chalana Wimalasuriya. According to the director, the film was mainly the final product of a research which belongs to the postmodernist cinema genre.

The film is produced by Piyumi Agampodi with first batch of the Diploma in Film and Television offered by the Drama & Theatre and Image Arts Unit, Department of Fine Arts, Faculty of Humanities, University of Kelaniya. Cinematography done by Susantha Mahagalgamuwa and co-edited by Chalana Wimalasuriya, and Prabath Agampodi. Lakshita Sankalpa is the makeup artist, Ananda Bandara is the colorist, and Gayantha Dissanayake is the assistant director. Costume designed by Ishara Kodithuwakku and Chalana Wimalasooriya is the assistant editor. Music is directed by Milinda Tennakoon.

The film was shot in Tissamaharama, Hambantota.

== Screening ==
The special screening of the film was held on 5 of September 2018 at the Auditorium of the Faculty of Social Sciences, University of Kelaniya. The official trailer was released in August 2019. The film was released on 23 March 2023 in EAP circuit cinemas around the country.

== Awards and accolades ==
In 2021, the film won the award for Best Director in Paris International Film Awards. Before that, it also won the Award for the Best Postmodern Film in the category of Postmodern Films for Any length representing the final rounds of Calcutta International Cult Film Festival and World Film Carnival in Singapore. Meanwhile, the film won the Special Jury Award for the Best Debut Filmmaker at the Golden Sparrow International Film Festival as well as Award for the Best International Feature Film at Port Blair International Film Festival. In the same year, the film won awards for the ‘Best High Schools Film’ at the Madonie Film Festival, Region of Sicily, Italy, and the ‘Best International Feature Film at the Port Blair International Film Festival.

The film also won the award for the ‘First Time Feature Film’ at the Third Boden International Film Festival (BIFF), Sweden in 2023.

The film also entered the final rounds of various global film festivals including, Vanilla Palm Film Festival & International Art Competition in California, Lulea International Film Festival in Sweden, Druk International Film festival in Bhutan, 2nd International Halicarnassus Film Festival, and Tagore International Film Festival in India.
