= Newstead Girls College =

Coordinates: 7.2104°N 79.8339°E

- Negombo; Sri Lanka

Information
- Type: Public, National
- Motto: More Beyond translated from the Latin plus ultra
- Religious affiliation: Methodist
- Established: 1815; 211 years ago
- Founder: Robert Newstead ministers
- Principal: Gayani Herath
- Grades: Classes 1- 13
- Gender: Female
- Enrollment: 3500+
- Colour: Red
- Alumni: Newsteadites
- Website: www.newsteadgirlscollege.com

Newstead Girls' College, Negombo is the oldest existing girls' college and the third oldest public school in Sri Lanka, founded by Wesleyan ministers in 1815-1816. Asia's first girls' school.

== History ==
Methodist missionaries founded the Wesleyan Methodist Sunday School in 1815, with Muhandiram L.E.Pereira as the head master. In September 1816, a regular school was established with the Rev. Don Daniel Pereira as the schoolmaster. On 17 September 1817, the Rev. Robert Newstead was appointed the first resident Minister of Negombo and the Dutch bungalow, which later came to be known as the Mission House was bought that same year.

In January 1818, a girls' school was proposed. In 1820, with the completion of the Wesleyan church, the Mission House was fully released for the school.

In 1883, the original cadjan classrooms were replaced by a permanent building. In 1895 the vernacular school was upgraded to the status of an English school.

In 1911 the school was transformed into the Wesleyan Girls English High School. In 1916 Claribel Beven became the first girl to get through the Elementary School Leaving Certificate Examination and in 1917 the first woman missionary principal, A. D. Dixon, was appointed.

In 1919 the school was renamed 'Newstead' after the first resident Minister of Negombo. In 1951, Newstead became an assisted school in terms of the Free Education Act of 1944. In 1962 the School was vested in the government, ending a period of 147 years during which the school was run by the Wesleyan Methodist Missionary Society.

Past Principals:

- Mudlier L. E. Pereira
- Rev. Don Daniel Perera
- Rev. Robert Newstead ( - 1924 )
- Rev. Rigby
- Rev. H. S. Sanford ( 1885 - 1891 )
- Rev. M. Hartley ( 1898 - 1899 )
- Ms. C. H. Ward ( - 1902 )
- Ms. Lawrence ( - 1911 )
- Ms. Laura ( 1911 - 1913 )
- Ms. C. De Vos ( 1914 - 1916 )
- Ms. A. D. Dixon ( 1917 - 1942 )
- Ms. Grace Robins ( 1943 - 1951 )
- Ms. D. K. Williams ( 1951 - 1954 )
- Ms. Orloff ( 1955 - 1960 )
- Ms. Edith Ridge ( 1960 - 1962 )
- Ms. Clarice De Mel ( 1962 - 1975 )
- Ms. Rodrigo ( 1975 - 1982 )
- Ms. Gunaratne ( 1982 - 1983 )
- Ms. J. M. Sumanasinghe ( 1983 - 1985 )
- Ms. R. M. Senaratne ( 1985 - 2003 )
- Ms. B. M. Weerasuriya ( 2003 - 2008 )
- Ms. Gayani Herath ( 2008 - 2024)
- Ms. udayangi dehiwaththa ( 2024 - 2026)
- Ms. saumya senewirathna ( 2026 - up to this day)

== Motto ==
The motto of the school is More Beyond, translated from the Latin plus ultra, the motto of Francis Bacon, who used it, along with the device of a ship of discovery, sailing past the Pillars of Hercules, out of the small Mediterranean sea into the vast Atlantic Ocean beyond, to describe the knowledge he offered mankind. It is a symbol of transcendence: open systems go beyond boundaries and point past themselves, toward a greater universe; beyond the finite, there is the infinite; beyond the known, the unknown.

== Houses ==
- Ward House

Colour - Green
Motto - Do the Task Before You

- Dixon House

Colour - Orange
Motto - Each for All and All for Each

- Hartley House

Colour - Yellow
Motto - Keep Smiling

- Lawrence House

Colour - Black
Motto - Up and On

== Current Situation ==
Currently the principal of Newstead Girls' College Negombo is saumya senewirathna. The current population of the school is about 3,500. The tutorial staff consist of about 125 teachers.

== Notable alumni ==
Name	Year/degree	Notability	Reference
Shalani Tharaka		Actress, Model	
Ruby de Mel		Actress	
Michelle Dilhara		Actress, Author, Environmentalist, Earth Day Ambassador	
Vidusha Lakshani		Triple Jumper	
Visakha Wijeyeratne		Artist	

== See also ==
- List of the oldest schools in Sri Lanka
