= Dilan Jay =

American rapper (born 1980)

Dilan Jay ඩිලාන් ජයසිංහ
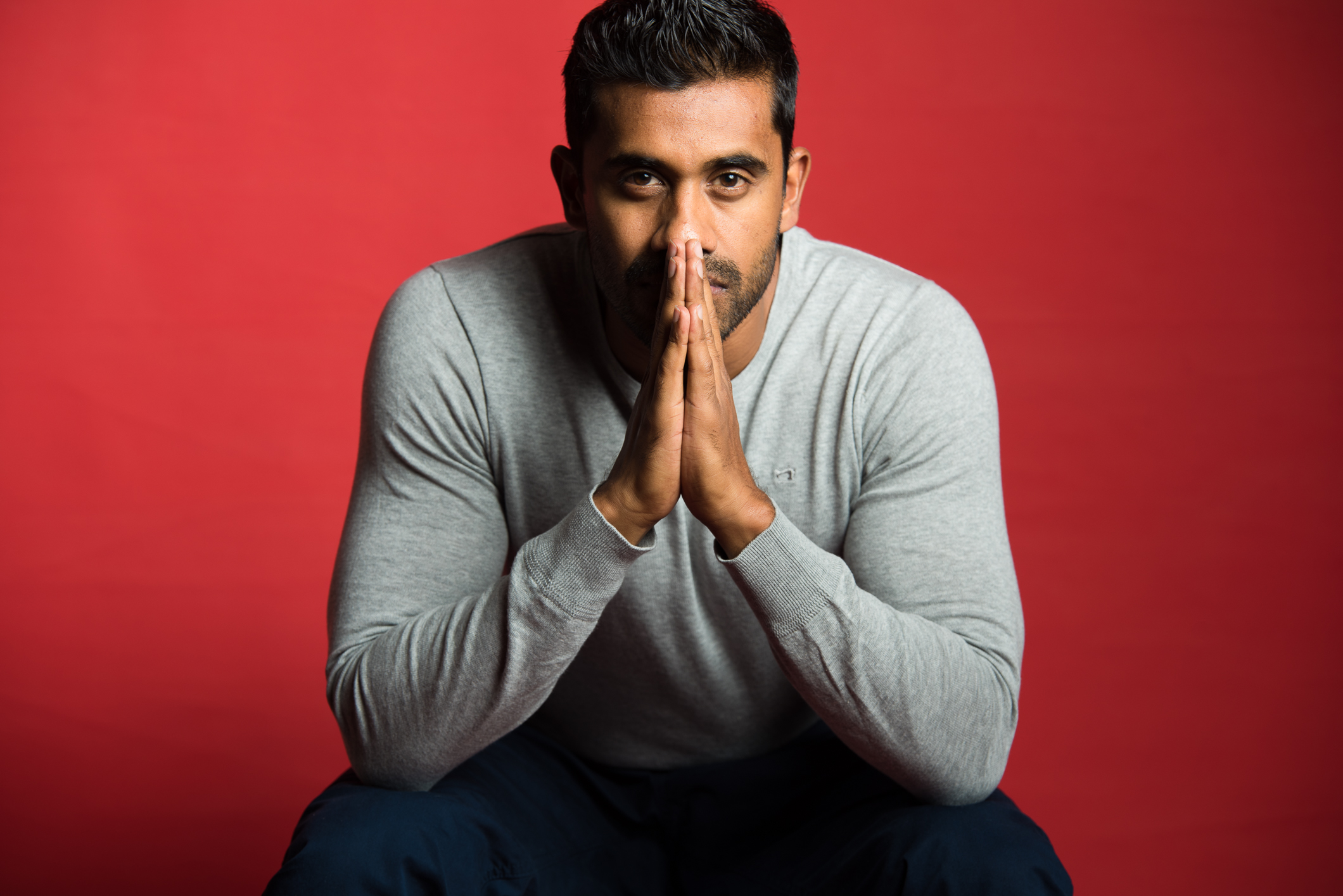
- Dilan Jay in 2014

Background information
- Also known as: Dilan Jay, DeLon
- Born: Walter Dilan Jayasingha; March 14, 1980 (age 46); United States of America
- Origin: Los Angeles, California, United States
- Genres: Hip-hop; pop; R&B
- Occupations: Entrepreneur, real estate investor, musician, filmmaker
- Instruments: Piano, Guitar
- Years active: 2004–present
- Label: Halcyon Records
- Website: https://dilanjay.com/

Walter Dilan Jayasingha (born March 14, 1980), known professionally as Dilan Jay, is an American entrepreneur, real estate investor, musician, and filmmaker. He is recognized as the first artist from his country of heritage, Sri Lanka, to place on the U.S. Billboard charts. He also achieved a No. 1 position on MTV's Most Popular Music Videos.

Dilan Jay released multiple musical albums with ten No. 1 international hits. His releases include two pop albums, four hip hop albums, and two acoustic albums. In 2022, he collaborated with rapper Money Man on the single January, which garnered significant attention. Throughout his career, Dilan has collaborated with prominent artists such as Ty Dolla $ign, Black-Eyed Peas drummer Keith Harris, Jacob Lutrell, and songwriter Darious Coleman.

In addition to his entertainment career, Dilan Jay has built a successful real estate portfolio, managing multimillion-dollar projects across the United States. He is also the founder of Wholesome Organics Corporation, a plant-based wellness brand, and MJW Group, a real estate investment and development firm.

== Career ==
=== Music ===
Dilan began his music career under the pseudonym "DeLon," achieving early success with the single Jeevithe, which was featured on Yes FM's Sri Lankan tsunami relief CD. During this period, he released multiple No. 1 radio hits and garnered awards from Sri Lanka's Derana Award show. Known as the "King of Ceylon," Dilan produced four albums and two mixtapes, collaborating with notable artists like Ty Dolla $ign and songwriter Jacob Luttrell.

In 2018, Dilan retired from his rap career, adopting the moniker Dilan Jay to mark a new musical direction. His singer-songwriter albums 3.14 (2018) and Songs About Love and Other Stuff (2019) reflect a shift to acoustic and pop influences. By 2022, his music amassed millions of streams across platforms, with singles like January featuring rapper Money Man.

=== Acting ===
Dilan Jay made his acting debut in the Sri Lankan film Looking Back on the Lion (2010) A.K.A Sinhawalokanaya, the country's first cricket-themed movie and a recognized national heritage film.

His American film debut came with Hollow Point (2019), an action thriller directed by Daniel Zirilli. Dilan starred as Nolan Cooray, with the film earning four festival awards and being distributed by Vertical Entertainment.

== Entrepreneurship and real estate ==
Dilan Jay started his real estate career in 2005 by managing two mid-rise buildings in Los Angeles. Through strategic management, he increased occupancy rates from below 30% to over 90% within two years, significantly improving the properties' value. In 2014, he founded Halcyon Opportunity Fund, raising $15 million for real estate projects, including multi-family developments, retail properties, and storage facilities.

In 2015, Jay founded MJW Group, a real estate investment and development firm. The company has completed over 50 projects nationwide, totaling 858 units and valued at over $400 million.

In 2021, Dilan Jay relocated to Tampa, Florida, where he launched two major multi-family projects: a 98-unit development in Palmetto Beach and an 83-unit project in New Port Richey. His real estate portfolio now includes over 60 projects nationwide, encompassing another 250 multi-family units and valued at more than $100 million, just in Florida.

Dilan Jay founded Wholesome Organics Corporation, a plant-based wellness company known for its energy shots made from natural ingredients. The company markets its products as clean, sustainable, and focused on mental clarity and stress management. Wholesome Organics has expanded into multiple retail stores nationwide and has been ranked the #1 healthiest energy shot in the United States, according to How Clean Is Your Energy.

=== Books ===
In 2021, Dilan published How to Be More Confident with Women: 7 Easy Steps for the Genuine Guy, offering practical advice on building confidence in social interactions.

== Discography ==
=== As DeLon ===
- The Connection (2005)
- Unstoppable (2008)
- S.O.N (Something Out of Nothing) (2011)
- Awake (2011)

=== As Dilan Jay ===
- 3.14 (2018)
- Songs About Love and Other Stuff (2019)
- Kick Back (2019)
- January (2022, featuring Money Man)
