= Solo Town =

2024 Sri Lankan musical film

Solo Town සෝලෝ ටවුන්
- Directed by: Chathurangana De Silva; Sahan Wickramarachchi
- Written by: Chathurangana De Silva; Prasadi Abeygunarathne; Ayesha Jayaratne
- Story by: Chathurangana De Silva
- Produced by: Stage Adventures Pvt. Ltd
- Starring: Raween Kanishka; Michelle Dilhara; Shanaya Vanhoff; Semini Iddamalgoda; Sujeeva Priyal
- Cinematography: Sahan Wickramarachchi; Pushpitha Nirmal
- Edited by: Lahiru Madushanka
- Music by: Chathurangana De Silva
- Production company: Gullio Studios
- Distributed by: LFD Theatres
- Release date: 5 December 2024
- Running time: 103 minutes
- Language: Sinhala
- Budget: $280,000(estd.)

Solo Town (Sinhala: සෝලෝ ටවුන්) is a 2024 Sri Lankan Sinhalese musical drama film co-directed by Chathurangana de Silva and Sahan Wickramarachchi. The film is co-produced by Uditha Cooray and Sewwandi Weerasinghe for Stage Adventures Private Limited. It stars Raween Kanishka, Michelle Dilhara and Shanaya Vanhoff in the lead roles along with, Semini Iddamalgoda and Sujeeva Priyal made supportive roles. It is the first boy band film in Sri Lanka.

== Plot ==
The film revolves around the dreams and lives of four young in a boy band: Asanjaya, Sanjana, Nonim, Heshan and Yulan.

== Cast ==
- Raween Kanishka as Asanjaya aka Jay
- Michelle Dilhara as Ama
- Shanaya Vanhoff as Anji
- Nonim Hashanth as Nonim
- Sanjana Dissanayake as Tharu
- Yulan Drew as Yulan
- Heshan Fernando as Heshan
- Semini Iddamalgoda as Asha
- Sujeewa Priyalal as Greshan
- Akalanka Prabhashwara as Rashian
- Chamisha Dissanayake as Kiyara
- Mahinda Wimalasiri as Some Mama
- Nivarthana Devage as Nadeesha
- Pahandi Walpita as Naduni
- Thirukumar
- Pavithra Wickramasinghe
- Tharanga Bulathsinghala
- Kanishka Weerabahu
- Ranjith Abeysuriya
- Hirushan Hettiarachi
- Rangana Weerasinghe
- Mihindu Ariyaratne as Band manager
- Duleeka Marapana in cameo role
- Falan Andrea in cameo role
- Raffella Fernando in cameo role
- Upul Liyanage in cameo role
- Lorenza Nalishani in cameo role
- Supun Abeysingha in cameo role

== Production ==
The film marks the debut cinema direction of Chathurangana De Silva and Sahan Wickramarachchi. De Silva also involved as the screenwriter along with his wife Prasadi Abeygunarathne and Ayesha Jayarathne and music director of the film, whereas Wickramarachchi was involved as the cinematographer along with Pushpitha Nirmal. Chathurangana De Silva is well known as a music director who involved in the popular songs: "Hitha Hirivæṭuṇādō", "Sanda Rēṇu Aethi Rūka", "Divyanganāvī", "Nīla Nuvan Aegē", "Sævændarī", "Suhadiniyē" and "Paeni Makuḷuvō". In 2023, producer Uditha Cooray, his wife Sewwandi Weerasinghe, director Chathurangana De Silva and his wife Prasadi Abeygunarathne started a company called "Stage Adventures". Through the company, they formed the first Boy Band of Sri Lanka, titled "Solo Town". They wanted to introduce the band to mass audience, which became the reason for making the movie called "Solo Town". The original members of the band: Nonim, Sanjana, Yulan and Heshan, are also acting in the film.

Harsha Manjula is the makeup artist and art directors are Madhuranga Marasinghe & Ayesha Jayarathne, Yashoda Danupama made the color combination, Kavindra Gangeeth as the production manager and Sonduru Lokupothagama is the assistant director. Supun Abeyratne is the choreographer, Aruna Kaluarachchi is the Sound mixer engineere, Pubudu Dhananjaya Vanigasekara is the dialogue, recorder, meanwhile special sound effects handled by W.G. Podiratne, visual effects supervision by Shehan Bobpe, and graphic design by Akash Hewaratne. Animation done by Ishwara Prabhat, Thineth Weerasinghe and where camera focusing handled by Ranjith Rupasingha and Tharindu Sandaruwan.

Sampath Fernandopulle, Shehan Galahitiyava, Gihan Chamika Reru, and Pazi are the lyricists of the film songs. Lead actor Raween Kanishka and Solo Town Band also involved in the background vocals along with Bachi Susan, Supun Perera, Kanchana Anuradhi, Mihindu Ariyaratne, Raini Charuka, Falan Andrea, Sarith and Surith. The film includes 8 songs including: Suralāliniyē.

The Muhurath festival and the program to introduce its actors was held recently at the premises of 'Wave by Singhe' in Bolgoda. Shooting commences from 8 May 2023 in Colombo and surrounding areas and few shots in Mirissa. The film was released on 6 September 2023 in Canada. In August 2024, trailer and songs of the film were launched in a program held at the Scope cinema hall, Colombo.
