= Janaka Kumbukage =

Sri Lankan actor

Janaka Kumbukage ජනක කුඹුකගේ
- Born: Wadduwa, Sri Lanka
- Occupations: Actor, dramatist, director
- Years active: 1984–present
- Awards: Presidential Best Actor

Janaka Kumbukage (ජනක කුඹුකගේ) [Sinhala]), is an actor in Sri Lankan cinema, stage drama and television. An actor primarily engaged in television, Kumbukage is notable for his roles in films Saroja, Daruwane and Udumbara.

== Personal life ==
He has one younger brother. His father and mother are retired teachers. He studied at more than five schools due to his parents' transfers. He studied at Wadduwa Madya Maha Vidyalaya, where his interest in drama has grown. He completed his A/L education in the commerce stream. Before entering drama, he entered Technical College, Maradana and studied Business Studies for four years. While involved in drama, he also worked in Milk Board. He is married to Anusha, where the wedding was celebrated in 1994. The couple has one son.

== Career ==
In 1984, Kumbukage started his drama career under the guidance of Gamini Haththotuwegama’s dramatic workshops and then became a member of his Street Drama Group. He also worked with Dharmasiri Bandaranayake, Somalatha Subasinghe, Asoka Handagama and German playwright Klauz Coozemberg in many stage plays while in street dramas. In 2000 he won the award for the best Stage Actor for the play Beehama Buhumi in State Drama Festival. His maiden television acting came through Siva Rahasa Pura directed by Wimalarante Adikari.

In 2009, he directed his maiden stage play Sulanga Mata Katha Karai. It was staged on July 25 and 26 at Lumbini Theatre, Colombo. Kumbukage started his film career with Sihina Deshayen back in 1996, directed by Boodee Keerthisena.

=== Notable theater works ===
- Adaraneeya Sanwadayak
- Ashawe Vidi Riya
- Banku Weeraya
- Debidi Bro
- Dhawala Bheeshana
- Eka-Adhipathi
- Handa Eliyata Wedi Thiyanna
- Hel Tamba
- Jana Mithura
- Jayasirita Pissu
- Kema Lasthi
- Kolamba Paara
- Makaraakshaya
- Mama Kamathima Chocolate – Meya Asa Biscuit
- Mamai Aanduwa
- Nonawaru Samaga Mahathwaru
- Paadada Asapuwa
- Puthra Samagama
- Sayanaye Sihinaya
- Sudarshi
- Suwishalapura

=== Notable television works ===
- Acid
- Adaraneeya Niagara
- Aeya
- Anantha Sihinaya
- Aparna
- Apayata Giya Gamanak
- Bhoomarangaya
- Bus Eke Iskole
- Devana Warama
- Dhawala Yamaya
- Divithura
- Diyawadana Maluwa
- Duvili Maliga
- Ekas Ginna
- Esala Kaluwara
- Hiru Dahasak Yata
- Hiru Thaniwela Ahase
- Holman Bottuwa
- Hopalu Arana
- Ilandariyo
- Ingammaruwa
- Isiwara Asapuwa
- Itu Devi Vimana
- Katu Kurullo
- Kutu Kutu Mama
- Liyagala Mal
- Mal Pipena Kale
- Malee
- Maya Agni
- Maya Mansala
- Mehew Rate
- Monaravila
- Namal Arana
- Nenalaa
- Nil Mal Viyana
- Nisala Vilthera
- Paata Paata Minissu
- Pembara Maw Sanda
- Podu
- Poori
- Pura Sakmana
- Ranga Soba
- Rangamadala Samugani
- Rathriya
- Romeo And Dante
- Sadgunakaraya
- Sadisi Tharanaya
- Sakee
- Salsapuna
- Sanda Ginigath Rathriya
- Sanda Kinduru
- Sapirivara
- Sasaraka Ima
- Sasara Seya
- Sihina Piyapath
- Sinansenna Anuththara
- Siva Rahasa Pura
- Snehaye Daasi
- Sudu Gindara
- Sulangata Madivee
- Swarna Veena
- Tharuka
- Tharu Kumari
- Tharumalee
- Thisara Peraliya
- Thodu
- Vasudha
- Vinivindimi
- Wansakkarayo

== Filmography ==
Key
†	Denotes film or TV productions that have not yet been released

Year	Film	Role	Ref.
1996	Sihina Deshayen		
1997	Bawa Karma		
1999	Mandakini		
2000	Saroja	Varuni's father	
2002	Punchi Suranganavi	Suren	
2003	Pura Sakmana		
2008	Pitasakwala Kumarayai Pancho Hathai	Alien	
2012	Daruwane	Samarasekara	
2018	Udumbara	Ananda's friend	
2019	President Super Star	ISIS leader	
2024	Hora Uncle	Nalinda	
TBA	Thanapathilage Gedara †		

== Awards and accolades ==
He has won several awards at the local stage drama, television and film festivals.

=== Sumathi Awards ===
Year	Nominee / work	Award	Result
1996	Isiwara Asapuwa	Best Upcoming Actor	Won

=== Presidential Film Awards ===
Year	Nominee / work	Award	Result
2000	Saroja	Best Actor	Won

=== State Drama Festivlals ===
Year	Nominee / work	Award	Result
2000	Beehama Buhumi	Best Actor	Won
2013	Adaraneeya Sanwadayak	Best Actor	Won
