= Sumathi Best Upcoming Teledrama Actress Award =

Annual Sri Lankan television award

The Sumathi Best Teledrama Supporting Actress Award is presented annually in Sri Lanka by the Sumathi Group of Campany associated with many commercial brands for the best Sri Lankan Upcoming actress of the year in television screen.

The award was first given in 1995. Following is a list of the winners of this prestigious title since then.

== Awards ==
Year	Best Upcoming Actor	Teledrama	Ref.
1995	Suweneetha Wimalaweera	Eka Gei Kurullo	
1996	Rashmi Raveena	Keetaya	
1997	Indika Piyumali	Dhawala Kethu	
1998	Nishamani Welagedara	Wilambeetha	
1999	Ama Wijesekara	Nisala Wila	
2000	Nimanthi Porage	Sudo Sudu	
2001	Semini Iddamalgoda	Irabatu Tharuwa	
2002	Jayani Senanayake	Sanda Amawakai	
2003	Nadee Chandrasekara	Asani Wasi	
2004	Chathurika Peiris	Sooriya Daruwo	
2006	Nadeesha Hemamali	Pulina Prasaada	
2007	Manjula Kumari	Olu	
2008	Himali Siriwardena	Sandagala Thanna	
2009	Upeksha Swarnamali	Samanalunta Wedi Thiyanna	
2010	Samanalee Fonseka	Doni	
2011	Dulani Anuradha	Pinibara Yamaya	
2012	Dinakshie Priyasad	Sandagiri Pawwa	
2013	Thisuri Yuwanika	Awasarai Piyabanna	
2014	Bimsara Premaratne	Appachchi	
2015	Shalani Tharaka	Handapana Gala	
2016	Dinusha Rajapathirana	Daskon	
2017	Gayathri Rajapakse	Maada Obama Viya	
2018	Volga Kalpani	Eka Gei Minissu	
2019	Kalani Dodantenna	Sahodaraya	
2021	Michelle Dilhara	Sudu Andagena Kalu Avidin	
