= Nehara Pieris Rajapakse =

Sri Lankan actress and singer

Nehara Pieris Rajapakse නෙහාරා පීරිස්
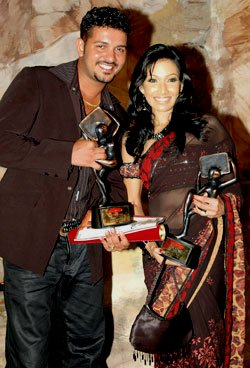
- Amila Abeysekara & Nehara with Raigam Tele'es Awards
- Born: Kumarasinghe Arachchige Dona Chrihashni Nehara Canishia Pieris; December 21, 1988 (age 37); Colombo
- Education: St. Lawrence's School
- Occupations: Actor; singer; dancer; TV host
- Years active: 2005–present
- Spouse(s): Nirmal Perera (m. 2008 div. 2011); Menaka Rajapakse (m. 2014)
- Parents: Curtis Pieris (father); Nishanthi Pieris (mother)
- Awards: Most Popular Actress

Kumarasinghe Arachchige Dona Chrihashni Nehara Canishia Pieris (born December 21, 1988, as නෙහාරා පීරිස්) [Sinhala]), popularly known as Nehara Pieris Rajapakse, is an actress in Sri Lankan cinema and television. Mostly active in television, she is also a singer, dancer, and a TV host.

== Personal life ==
Nehara Pieris was born on 21 December 1988. Her father is Curtis Pieris and mother is Nishanthi Pieris. She has one brother, Nehan Pieris. She completed education from St. Lawrence's School.

She was married to Nirmal Perera, whom she had a long-term affair in 2008. However, they got divorce in 2011 due to many disputes. She is then married to popular television and cinema actor Menaka Rajapakse. The wedding was celebrated on 28 January 2014 at Kingsbury Hotel, Colombo. Menaka was divorced from his first marriage and have one daughter.

== Career ==
She started to perform in advertisements in 2005 and got the opportunity to appear in the music video Mihiraviye sung by Shihan Mihiranga in 2007. Her maiden television acting came through Senehasata Adare directed by Nalan Mendis in 2007. Then she appeared in many popular television serials including Muthu Kirilli, Amanda and Ruwan Maliga. She won three awards for the most popular actress for the same role in the serial Muthu Kirilli.

She participated to the reality show Sirasa Dancing Stars and won fifth place. She collaborated with the dance troupe Torrential and performed on 5 December 2009 at Ummul Maleeha Memorial Hall, Panadura.

She presented the television musical program Tea Party telecast by TV Derana for three years.

In 2020, she started a dancing academy Nehara Dance Studio at Attidiya, Dehiwala.

=== Selected television serials ===
- Adaraneeya Niagara
- Amanda
- Bharyawo
- Googly
- Heily
- Muthu Kirilli
- Ruwan Maliga
- Situ Medura

== Filmography ==
| Year | Film | Role | Ref. |
|---|---|---|---|
| 2011 | It’s a Matter of Love | Jennifer | |
| 2016 | Puthandiya | Samanmalee | |
| 2021 | Apata Sadunu Ape Lokaya | Cameo appearance | |
| 2023 | Yaaluwoda? Yaaluida? | | |

== Awards and accolades ==
She has won Raigam Tele'es most popular actress award for record four consecutive times from 2009 to 2012.

=== Raigam Tele'es ===
| Year | Nominee / work | Award | Result |
|---|---|---|---|
| 2009 | Muthu Kirilli | Most Popular Actress | Won |
| 2010 | Muthu Kirilli | Most Popular Actress | Won |
| 2011 | Amanda | Most Popular Actress | Won |
| 2012 | Amanda | Most Popular Actress | Won |

=== Sumathi Awards ===
| Year | Nominee / work | Award | Result |
|---|---|---|---|
| 2009 | Muthu Kirilli | Most Popular Actress | Won |
