= Apata Sadunu Ape Lokaya =

2021 Sri Lankan children's film

- Promotional poster
- Sinhala: අපට සැදුණ අපේ ලෝකය
- Directed by: Lal Priyadeva
- Written by: Lal Priyadeva
- Based on: Hollywood film
- Produced by: Sunil T. Films
- Starring: Pankaja Chandev; Menaka Rajapakse; Nehara Peiris; Rajiv Nanayakkara
- Cinematography: Janith Gunasekara
- Edited by: Dhanal Thiranjana
- Music by: Neo Pitigala
- Release date: 14 February 2021
- Country: Sri Lanka
- Language: Sinhala

Apata Sadunu Ape Lokaya (Sinhala: අපට සැදුණ අපේ ලෝකය) is a 2021 Sri Lankan Sinhala children's adventure thriller film. It was directed by Lal Priyadeva and produced by Sunil T. Fernando for Sunil T. Films. It stars child artist Pankaja Chandev in the lead role, with Menaka Rajapakse, Nehara Peiris and Rajiv Nanayakkara also appearing. Kavitha Anjali, granddaughter of Baptist Fernando, made her debut cinema appearance in the film.

Filming began in 2019 and took place in Deraniyagala, Galigamuwa, Navugala and Harigala. The premiere was held on the 14 February 2021 at the Liberty Cinema Hall, Kollupitiya. Due to being Sunil T's 72nd production, the film was released in 72 cinemas across Sri Lanka.

== Plot ==
A young mother, a father, a child and their maid are going to Polonnaruwa for a picnic. On the way, their vehicle veers off the road and overturns into a jungle. The father, mother and maid are killed by wild animals, but the boy escapes and grows up with the animals.

== Controversy ==
This film caused controversy among Sri Lankans due to the alleged use of copyrighted materials from the Warner Bros./Netflix film Mowgli: Legend of the Jungle. The producers denied that any piracy occurred.

== Cast ==
- Pankaja Chandev
- Menaka Rajapakse as Thejas
- Nehara Peiris as Nilu
- Rajiv Nanayakkara as Lawyer
- Rajitha Rodrigo
- Lakshmi Bogoda
- Thilina Lakmal
- Priya Selvam
- Raji Mendis
- Kavitha Anjali
