= A/L Iwarai =

Sri Lankan television drama

- Also known as: Sinhala: ඒ ලෙවල් ඉවරය
- Directed by: Lakmini Amaradeva
- Starring: Jagath Manuwarna; Samanalee Fonseka; Dasun Pathirana; Shalani Tharaka; Nino Araliya; Madura Prabashwara
- Country of origin: Sri Lanka
- Original language: Sinhala
- No. of episodes: 100

Production
- Producer: Magic Lantern
- Running time: Monday to Friday at 7.30pm

Original release
- Network: Sri Lanka Rupavahini Corporation
- Release: 2014

A/L iwarai (Sinhala: ඒ ලෙවල් ඉවරය) 𝗐𝖺s a Sri Lankan television drama broadcast by Sri Lanka Rupavahini Corporation. A/L iwarai written & directed by Lakmini Amaradeva and this is the most popular teledrama at 7:30pm.

== C𝖺𝗌t ==
- Jagath Manuwarna
- Samanalee Fonseka
- Kalana Gunasekara
- Dasun Pathirana
- Shalani Tharaka
- Nino Jayakody
- 𝖪𝖺𝗏𝗂𝗇𝗀𝖺 𝖯𝖾𝗋𝖾𝗋𝖺

== Music ==
Music directed by Ravihans Wetakepotha. Man Game Kolla Sinhala:මං ගමේ කොල්ලා is the most famous song in this teledrama.

== See also ==
Sri Lanka Rupavahini Corporation
