= Pitasakwala Kumarayai Pancho Hathai =

Pitasakwala Kumarayai Pancho Hathai පිට සක්වළ කුමාරයයි පැංචෝ හතයි
- Directed by: Sirimal Wijesinghe
- Written by: Sirimal Wijesinghe
- Produced by: Cinemaya International
- Starring: Sanath Gunathilake; Dilhani Ekanayake; Janaka Kumbukage
- Cinematography: Prabath Roshan
- Edited by: Ravindra Guruge
- Music by: Aruna Lian
- Production company: Cinemaya International
- Distributed by: CEL Theaters
- Release date: 24 July 2008
- Country: Sri Lanka
- Language: Sinhalese

Pitasakwala Kumarayai Pancho Hathai (Alien Prince and Seven Kids) (Sinhala: පිට සක්වළ කුමාරයයි පැංචෝ හතයි) is a 2008 Sri Lankan Sinhala science fiction film directed by Sirimal Wijesinghe and produced by Dushyantha Mahabaduge for Cinemaya International. It stars Sanath Gunathilake and Dilhani Ekanayake in lead roles along with Janaka Kumbukage and Suminda Sirisena. Music composed by Aruna Lian. It is the 1109th Sri Lankan film in the Sinhala cinema.

== Cast ==
- Sanath Gunathilake
- Dilhani Ekanayake
- Janaka Kumbukage as Alien
- Nilanthi Wijesinghe
- Suminda Sirisena
- Ishan Samsudeen
- Kapila Sigera
- Devnaka Porage
- Dimuthu Chinthaka
