= Sinhawalokanaya =

Sinhawalokanaya සිංහාවලෝකනය
- Directed by: Suneth Malinga Lokuhewa
- Written by: Suneth Malinga Lokuhewa
- Produced by: Rohan De Silva; Pasan Chandrasekara; Dilan Lamb
- Starring: Dilan Jay; Raini Charuka; Pubudu Chathuranga; Menaka Rajapakse
- Cinematography: Prabath Roshan
- Edited by: Pravin Jayaratne
- Music by: Rookantha Gunathilake; Ravihans Wetakepotha
- Production company: EAP circuit cinemas
- Distributed by: EAP Theaters
- Release date: 14 January 2011
- Running time: 144 minutes
- Language: Sinhala

Sinhawalokanaya (සිංහාවලෝකනය - Lion's Pride) is a 2011 Sinhala sports drama film written and directed by Suneth Malinga Lokuhewa. The film features Dilan Jay and Raini Charuka Goonatillake in the leading roles while Menaka Rajapakse, Sanath Gunathilake, Kumara Thirimadura, Mihira Sirithilaka, Kanchana Mendis, Pubudu Chathuranga and Cletus Mendis also play key supporting roles. The Sri Lanka cricket star, Tillakaratne Dilshan also played a supporting role.

Produced by EAP circuit cinemas, the film had music scored by Ravihans Wetakepotha while songs were composed by Ravihans Wetakepotha, Rookantha Gunathilake and Dilan Lamb. It was released in January 2011 and was a very big commercial hit in Sri Lankan Film History in that year. But it received critical acclaim for background score and the use of music and sound design while getting lukewarm reviews from Critics for the overall film direction. This is the 1150th film in Sri Lanka cinema.

== Plot ==
Dhanuka Wickramasinghe is a popular Sri Lankan cricketer who is a fine allrounder, but started to fail in many occasions. The story begins in a hospital, where Dhanuka with hospital attendants carry an old man in a bed. After his continuous failures, Dhanuka started to regain his form at sudden instance and he was included in the Sri Lanka 2011 Cricket World Cup squad as well. Media starts to find what is behind him to gain quick progression. Therefore a journalist, Shenali comes for an interview with Dhanuka. He starts to explain what happened to him, and what changed him over last few months. But he says it will be hard to believe as well.

The story rolled way back to 28 September 1947, when Sri Lanka was a colony of British rule. Some young persons of Sooriyasiri village, play cricket, meanwhile some English wealthy people travel in a bus. They saw some rural Sinhalese play their own sport and went to challenge them for a match. Sinhalese only scored 35 runs and Englishmen won the match without giving any wicket. However, one Sinhala boy named Jangu challenges British that, another match will be held after three months and if Sinhalese won the match, British should leave the country, or if British won the match, Sinhalese people will work for them until death.

Jangu, with his friends starts to practice the game, but head of the village criticized them and wanted British to win the match, so his profession will be secured. However, after getting advise from village monk, they went to meet a powerful Swami called Yasomithra to take more advice about the game. Yasomithra gives three medicinal balls with a time machine called Thri Kaala Yanthra. By using the machine, the eleven players - Jangu, Cyril, Mohotha, Tikka, Ran Nayide, Kiri Nayide, Bindu, Muththu, Chanthuwa, etc. went to the future, where the destination was at Dhanuka's home.

Dhanuka understood the story and started to help these ancient young team. He, along with his team mates including Tillakaratne Dilshan, starts to train the team according to their capabilities. The team trained very well with modern batting, bowling and fielding techniques, which is unmatch with ancient strategies. Meanwhile, in the village in 1947, everyone starts to blame Jangu for his radical thoughts and criticize his parents as well. Village head ordered Jangu's father Jagilis to ask apology for British people. With all these incidents taking place, Hawadiya organize the children in the village to play for the match, due to the uncertainty of Jangu and crew for the match.

On the day when the match have to be played, Jangu and crew arrives at the right moment with Dhanuka for the match. Sinhalese batted first and made a total below 200. However, during the match, Jangu's love interest Samadari, who has taken poison, fell apart. The match finished first day and Samadari was taken for Ayurveda medicine. With all these incidents, Village head asks his son Cyril to involve in a match-fixing and Cyril teaches all the modern techniques to British. On the second day, British starts to take the game away from Sinhalese by scoring modern shots. They posted 333 on the first innings. Meanwhile, Cyril tries to kill Jangu later that night, but eventually Cyril was bitten by a snake. Jangu helped him for the cures and finally Cyril confessed his faults in the match.

However, in third day, Sinhalese batted and posted a lead of 135 or more for British to win. With one Sinhala player struck down by a beamer, Hawadiya got a chance to play the match. English took a good start, but with good fielding, they fell in quick successions. When last wicket is playing, Englishmen required only 2 runs to win, with one wicket in hand. English captain hit the ball a long distance, where Chanthuwa and Hawadiya both ran to take the catch. Both fell over, But Hawadiya stood with the ball in his hand. Sinhalese won the match and credit went to Dhanuka as well. Samadari healed at last credits and Dhanuka ended his thrilling story.

In the future, the old man in the hospital is revealed to be Jangu, who was the youngest of his squad and the last alive. He thanks Dhanuka for helping them to win the match, and takes his last breath.

== Cast ==
- Dilan Jay as Jangu (voiceover by Chaminda Sampath Jayaweera)
- Raini Charuka Goonatillake as Samadari
- Menaka Rajapakse as Dhanuka Wickramasinghe
- Sanath Gunathilake as Gam Muladani
- Kumara Thirimadura as Mohotha
- Sarath Kothalawala as Tikka
- Mihira Sirithilaka as Hawadiya
- Kanchana Mendis as Shenali Pieris
- Pubudu Chathuranga as Cyril
- Cletus Mendis as Jagilis
- Jayalal Rohana as Yasomithra Sami
- Seetha Kumari as Bindu's granny
- Palitha Silva as Heen appo
- Chinthaka Pieris as Ran Nayide
- Janaka Ranasinghe as Kiri Nayide
- Maureen Charuni as Magilin
- Dilhani Ekanayake as Subharath Manike (Samadari's mother)
- Kusum Renu as Dingiri Menike
- Damitha Abeyratne as Sirimal Ethana
- Gamini Hettiarachchi as Sube
- Ashen Manjula as Bindu
- Udayanthi Kulatunga as Silindi
- Tillakaratne Dilshan as Himself
- Darshan Dharmaraj as Muththu
- Wasantha Kumaravila as Waththuwa
- Sadani Sulakna as Pinchi
- G.R Perera as Veda mahaththaya

== Production ==
Sinhawalokanaya provided many new faces to Sri Lankan cinema along with the legends already in the cinema to accompany for the first Sri Lankan cricket film. The main role is played by Dilan Jay, who is a US-based singer, who influenced his songs during North East war to enhance the courage of the people. Raini Goonatillake, who is the elder daughter of famous singers Rookantha Goonatillake and Chandralekha Perera who is USA based and also making the first steps in cinema. Former Sri Lanka cricketer and captain Tillakaratne Dilshan also took part for the film, which is his first in the silver screen. Menaka Rajapakse is a renowned television actor also made his debut in cinema with this film. The Soundtrack composed by Ravihans Wetakepotha received wide acclaim from the general audience and the critics. Many of the foreign actors also provided their contribution to the film.

In January 2011, original DVD of the film was presented to the President Mahinda Rajapakse at the Temple Trees.

== Release ==
The film was released on 2011, prior to the 2011 ICC Cricket World Cup. This has influenced among the public due to that Sri Lanka being an ICC Full Member country and also one of the three hosts of the 2011 World Cup.

== Soundtrack ==
The Soundtrack composed by Ravihans Wetakpotha won the best movie soundtrack of the year in Derana LUX movie awards 2011.

No.	Title	Lyrics	Singer(s)	Length
1.	"Mathakada Handawe"	Nilar N. Kasim	Raini Charuka Goonatillake & Ruwan Hettiarachchi	4:37
2.	"Warella"	Sunil Wimalaweera	Amarasiri Pieris and Sanka D	2:44
3.	"Hiruge Kiranai (Lak Amme)"	Nandana Wickramage	Rookantha Goonatillake	3:35
4.	"Hip Hip Hooray"	Kelum Srimal	Dilan Lamb	3:55
Total length:				14:11

== Awards ==
The Soundtrack composed by Ravihans Wetakpotha won the best movie soundtrack of the year in Derana LUX movie awards 2011. The Sri Lankan community in Hollywood appreciate the film in October 2011. The Asian Film and Drama Foundation, which is a Hollywood-based Sinhala cinema circuit awarded excellency awards to the film crew. Director Suresh Malinga Lokuhewa won Best Direction award and Best Film Award to two producers Pasan Chandrasekara and Ravi Hans. Two more merit awards was given to Sri Lankan cricketer Tillakaratne Dishan who made a guest appearance and the main actor Dilon Jayasinghe.
