= Sujeewa Priyalal =

Sri Lankan actor

Sujeewa Priyalal (Sujeewa Priyal)
- සුජීව ප්‍රියාල්
- Born: Loku Yaddehige Sujeewa Priyalal; 9 May 1973 (age 53); Colombo, Sri Lanka
- Education: Isipathana College, Colombo
- Occupations: Actor; director; producer
- Years active: 1993-present
- Known for: Machan
- Spouse: Duleeka Marapane (m. 2015)
- Parents: L. Y. Mendis Piyarathne (father); D. Edirisooriya (mother)

Loku Yaddehige Sujeewa Priyalal Film Industry appears as Sujeewa Priyal (Sinhala: සුජීව ප්‍රියාල්) (born 9 May 1973 in Colombo, Sri Lanka) popularly known as Sujeewa Priyalal (Sujeewa Priyal) is a Sri Lankan actor, producer, writer and film director. He appeared first lead character as "Piyal" in Machan Sinhala film in 2008.

== Personal life ==
Sujeewa Priyalal was born on 9 May 1973 in Colombo, Sri Lanka. His father was Mendis Priyalal and mother, D. Edirisooriya. Sujeewa has two brothers and two sisters in his family. He attended Isipathana College, Colombo, Sri Lanka.

In 2015 he married with Sri Lankan professional actress Duleeka Marapana.

== Career ==
Sujeewa is one of the actors in Sri Lankan cinema, film writer, producer and a Director. He appeared first lead role in Machan Sinhala film in 2008. As well as he has contributed in acting for Sri Lankan films The Frozen Fire, Maya 3D, Prathiroo, Ira Handa Yata, Suparna. He appeared in television as the role of "Themiya" in Divithura teledrama on Hiru TV. He contributed a role in popular Sri Lankan teledrama Snap broadcast on Swarnawahini.

In 2020 He produced and directed Suparna Sri Lankan Sinhala film.

== Filmography ==
=== Films ===
Year	Title	Role	Ref.
2008	Machan	Piyal	
2009	Ira Handa Yata	Soldier	
2012	Prathiroo		
2016	Maya 3D	Rekha	
2018	The Frozen Fire	Somawansa Amarasinghe	

=== Selected television series ===
- Divithura
- Internasanal
- Isiwara Ranakeli
- Meenu
- Muthu Palasa
- Snap
- Uthuwan Kande Saradiyel
- Vinivindimi Adura
- Wehi Pabalu Sela
