= Tharaka Mal =

Tharaka Mal තාරකා මල්
- Directed by: Milton Jayawardena
- Written by: K. D. Nicholas
- Produced by: EAP Films
- Starring: Roshan Ranawana; Nadeesha Hemamali; Anarkali Akarsha
- Cinematography: Ayeshman Hettiarachchi
- Edited by: Siddhartha Nayanananda
- Music by: Charudaththa Ilangasinghe
- Distributed by: EAP Theatres
- Release date: 30 May 2007
- Country: Sri Lanka
- Language: Sinhala

Tharaka Mal (Sinhala: තාරකා මල්) is a 2007 Sri Lankan Sinhala romantic drama film directed by Milton Jayawardena and produced by Soma Edirisinghe for EAP Films. It stars Roshan Ranawana and Nadeesha Hemamali in lead roles along with Anarkali Akarsha and Nalin Pradeep Udawela. Music composed by Charudaththa Ilangasinghe. It is the 1088th Sri Lankan film in the Sinhala cinema.

== Cast ==
- Roshan Ranawana as Mahasen
- Nadeesha Hemamali as Madhavi
- Anarkali Akarsha as Suranya
- Nalin Pradeep Udawela as Kumaran
- Pubudu Chathuranga as Parthipan
- Muthu Tharanga as Parvathi
- Pradeep Senanayake as Robert Meewella
- Nimal Anthony as Navaratne Bandara
- Hyacinth Wijeratne as Agnes
- Sulakkana Mihiripenna
- Nelum Perera
- Janaka Ranasinghe as Siridasa
- Udaya Shantha
