= Appata Siri =

Appata Siri අප්පට සිරි
- Directed by: Lal Priyadeva
- Written by: Lal Priyadeva
- Produced by: N. Udaya Kumar; P. Arooran
- Starring: Mahendra Perera; Prashani Perera; Chalaka Chamupathi
- Cinematography: Janith Gunasekara; Indika Aththanayake
- Edited by: Prabath Perera
- Music by: Edward Jayakody
- Production companies: Balaji Cine Films; Manon Cine Combines
- Distributed by: Movie Producers & Importers Co (Pvt) Ltd
- Release date: 22 September 2017
- Running time: 2h 20mins
- Country: Sri Lanka
- Language: Sinhala
- Budget: 12 Million
- Box office: 10 Million

Appata Siri (Sinhala: අප්පට සිරි) is a 2017 Sri Lankan Sinhala comedy film directed by Lal Priyadeva and co-produced by N. Udaya Kumara and P. Arooran for Balaji Cine Films and Manon Cine Combines. It stars Mahendra Perera in a dual role with Prashani Perera in lead roles along with Rajiv Nanayakkara and Chalaka Chamupathi. The music was composed by Edward Jayakody. This is the first cinematic appearance by singer Chalaka Chamupathi. It is the 1287th Sri Lankan film in the Sinhala cinema.

== Plot ==
Ranaweera is an ordinary man without a job. Suraweera is a wealthy businessman. They both share the same identical looks in this comedy although they have never met. Ranaweera discovers Suraweera and tries to deceive everyone and take on the wealthy lifestyle of Suraweera.

== Cast ==
- Mahendra Perera as Mahamudalige Ranaweera / Suraweera Mayadunne
- Prashani Perera as Nadeera Mayadunne
- Chalaka Chamupathi as Pushpadantha Boralugoda
- Hyacinth Wijeratne as Rathnawathi Alapatha Kumarihami
- Rajiv Nanayakkara as Lawyer Debokkawala Chinthaka Kavinda
- Inoka Edirisinghe as Thilini, Lawyer's wife
- Teddy Vidyalankara as Walankade Newton
- Bandula Wijeweera as Chandrapala
- Don Guy
- Sanet Dikkumbura as Amaradasa kapuwa
- Sunil Premakumara as Upali

== Songs ==
No.	Title	Lyrics	Singer(s)	Length
1.	"Appata Siri Mata Hithaganda Ba"	Chandradasa Fernando	Latha Walpola, Bandula Wijeweera, Chalaka Chamupathi
2.	"Oba Wenwu Daa Idala"	Chandradasa Fernando	Uresha Ravihari
