= Sumathi Most Popular Actress Award =

Sri Lankan actress award

The Sumathi Popular Teledrama Actress Award is presented annually in Sri Lanka by the Sumathi Group of Campany associated with many commercial brands for the most Popular Sri Lankan actress of the year in television screen by the vote of the people.

Yashoda Wimaladarma has received the award 5 times becoming the most awarded.

The award was first given in 1995. Following is a list of the winners of this prestigious title since then.

Year	Popular Actress	Ref.
1995	Nilmini Tennakoon	
1996	Chandani Seneviratne	
1997	Vasanthi Chathurani	
1998	Yashoda Wimaladharma	
1999	Yashoda Wimaladharma	
2000	Yashoda Wimaladharma	
2001	Yashoda Wimaladharma	
2002	Yashoda Wimaladharma	
2003	Kanchana Mendis	
2004	Nayana Kumari	
2005	Not Awarded	
2006	Chathurika Peiris	
2007	Oshadi Hewamadduma	
2008	Manjula Kumari	
2009	Nehara Peiris	
2010	Umayangana Wickramasinghe	
2011	Udari Warnakulasooriya	
2012	Nadeesha Hemamali	
2013	Dinakshie Priyasad	
2014	Ruwangi Rathnayake	
2015	Shalani Tharaka	
2016	Ishara Sandamini	
2017	Nayanathara Wickramaarachchi	
2018	Shalani Tharaka	
2019	Nayomi Thakshila	
2020	Not Awarded	
2021	Senali Fonseka	
2022	Not Awarded	
2023	Dusheni Miurangi	
2024	Dusheni Miurangi	
2025	Dinakshie Priyasad	
2026	Dusheni Miurangi	
