= Suparna (film) =

- සුපර්ණා
- Directed by: Sujeewa Priyal
- Written by: Sujeewa Priyal
- Produced by: NorthWest Films
- Starring: Duleeka Marapana; Dinakshie Priyasad; Ashan Dias; Darshan Dharmaraj
- Cinematography: Dhanushka Gunathilake
- Edited by: Pravin Jayaratne
- Music by: Pabalu Wijegunawardana
- Production companies: North West Films; 3rd Bell Theater
- Distributed by: Ridma Circuit
- Release date: 14 February 2020
- Running time: 97 minutes
- Country: Sri Lanka
- Language: Sinhala

Suparna (Sinhala: සුපර්ණා) is a 2020 Sri Lankan Sinhala fantasy thriller and first environmental Sci-fi film, directed by Sujeewa Priyal Yaddehige and produced by Kalyani Ranawaka form North West Films. It features an ensemble cast where Duleeka Marapana in lead role along with Dinakshie Priyasad, Ashan Dias, Darshan Dharmaraj and Sanjeewa Upendra in supportive roles. Music composed by Pabalu Wijegunawardana.

Superna talks about environmental degradation caused by human activity, from genetic predation.

In October 2020, Dhanushka Gunathilake won the award for the Best Cinematography at Indus Valley International Film Festival.

== Releasing ==
Initially planned to release on 31 January 2020, the film was officially screened on 14 February 2020.

== Cast ==
- Duleeka Marapana as Suparna
- Dinakshie Priyasad as Sumali
- Ashan Dias as Indrajith
- Darshan Dharmaraj as AYO 433
- Upendra Sanjeewa as King
- Janak Premalal as Mastor
- Veena Jayakody as Anula, Suparna's mother
- Kalana Gunasekara as Raveen
- Wilson Gunaratne as Professor
- Hyacinth Wijeratne as Indrajith's mother
- Vishwajith Gunasekara as Chandrasoma, Suparna's father
- Buddhika Jayarathne as Police officer
- Mali Jayaweerage as mother of raped daughter
- Wishwa Lanka as Orak
- Richard Mundy
- Ranjit Rubasinghe
- Ryan Van Rooyen as Matthew
- Kenara Weerathunga
- Wasantha Wittachchi

== Soundtrack ==
The film consists with two songs.

No.	Title	Singer(s)	Length
1.	"Do Dasa Aambari"	Dumal Warnakulasuriya, Dulshara de Alwis
2.	"Karanne Kawada Kawuruda"	Duleeka Marapana, Isuru Samarawickrama, Sasitha Senanayake, Yohan Ranasinghe
