= Thuththiri =

- Title card
- Genre: TV Series
- Created by: Sanjaya Nirmal
- Directed by: Sanjaya Nirmal
- Starring: Michelle Dilhara; Rithu Akarsha; Maureen Charuni; Kavinga Perera; Niroshan Wijesinghe
- Country of origin: Sri Lanka
- Original language: Sinhala
- No. of episodes: 80 (final)

Production
- Producer: Udara Palliyaguruge
- Running time: 20 minutes per episode (80 episodes)

Original release
- Network: Sirasa TV

Thuththiri (Sinhala: තුත්තිරි) is a long running Sri Lankan science fiction television series broadcast on Sirasa TV and directed by Sanjaya Nirmal. The drama is about extraterrestrials invading Earth.

== Plot ==
The story is based on a mythical belief that people will live under thuththiri plants in future. The drama begins with the invasion of a group of aliens to the earth, starring Michelle Dilhara, Morin Charuni, Kavinga Perera and Jake Senaratna. It is said that they were sent to protect the earth from pollution and over consumption of poisonous materials. With their extraordinary skills they quickly learned the human behaviorism and human language in order to communicate with people. The aliens live inside a housing scheme where people tend to interact more with each other.

== Cast and characters ==
- Paboda Sandeepani as Kia
- Rithu Akarsha
- Michelle Dilhara
- Anuradha Edirisinghe
- Medha Jayaratne
- Kavinga Perera
- Niroshan Wijesinghe
- Sanath Wimalasiri
- Sandani Fernando as Tia
- Maureen Charuni
- Sangeeth Prabu Shankar
