= Raigam Tele'es Most Popular Actress Award =

The Raigam Tele'es Most Popular Actress Award is presented annually in Sri Lanka by the Kingdom of Raigam for the most Popular Sri Lankan television actress of the year, determined by a publicly popular vote.

The award was first given in 2005. Following is a list of the winners of this award since 2005.

== Award winners ==
Year	Popular Actress	ref
2005	Chathurika Peiris	
2006	Manjula Kumari	
2007	Chathurika Peiris	
2008	Chathurika Peiris	
2009	Nehara Peiris	
2010	Nehara Peiris	
2011	Nehara Peiris	
2012	Nehara Peiris	
2013	Asha Edirisinghe	
2014	Asha Edirisinghe	
2015	Udari Warnakulasooriya	
2016	Shalani Tharaka	
2017	Nayanathara Wickramarachchi	
2018	Nayanathara Wickramarachchi	
2019	Nayanathara Wickramarachchi	
2020	Shalani Tharaka	
2021	Shalani Tharaka	
2022	Dusheni Miurangi	
2023	Dusheni Miurangi	
2024	Dinakshie Priyasad	
2025	Dinakshie Priyasad	
2026	Dusheni Miurangi	
