= Podu (TV series) =

Sri Lankan action thriller television serial

- season 1 title card
- පොදු
- Genre: Action; Romance; Thriller
- Created by: Sharmila Dharmarasa Fonseka; Dammika Wijewickrama; Gayathri Heenatigala; Sudesh Udaya Kumara
- Developed by: TV Derana
- Directed by: Sharmila Dharmarasa Fonseka
- Starring: Randika Gunathilaka; Lahiruni Salwathura; Kalana Gunasekara; Michelle Dilhara; Aishwarya S Varman; Dushshyantha Hettiarachchi
- Opening theme: "Podu (පොදු) Theme Song"
- Composer: Nimesh Kulasinghe
- Country of origin: Sri Lanka
- Original language: Sinhala
- No. of seasons: 2
- No. of episodes: 24

Production
- Editor: Rakitha Udara Dikkumbura
- Camera setup: Nilantha Kumara
- Running time: 40 minutes

Original release
- Network: TV Derana
- Release: November 28, 2020 – March 13, 2022

Related
- Podu season 2

Podu (Sinhala: පොදු) is a 2020 Sri Lankan action romantic teledrama broadcast on TV Derana. The series is directed by Sharmila Dharmarasa Fonseka and produced by TV Derana. The first season was aired on 28 November 2020, every weekend at 8.30 pm. The season one ended on 27 December 2020 after airing 10 episodes.

The season 1 starred Randika Gunathilaka and Lahiruni Salwathura in lead roles along with Manoja Fernando, Rasadari Peiris and Kalana Gunasekara in supportive roles. Popular television presenter Thanuja Jayawardana also made her acting debut with the season one. The show became a popular serial, where the crew had to film the second season as well.

The second season titled Podu 2 was launched at a red carpet event and was aired on 29 January 2022. Kalana Gunasekara, Randika Gunathilaka, and Lahuruni Salwathura reprised their roles from the first season. In the second season, the director introduced Michelle Dilhara, Aishwarya S. Varman and Dushyantha Hettiarachchi into the regular cast.

== Seasons ==
Season	Title	Episodes	Originally aired	
Season	Title	Episodes	First aired	Last aired
1	Podu	10 episodes	28 November 2020	27 December 2020
2	Podu Season 2	14 episodes	29 January 2022	13 March 2022

== Plot ==
The main storyline of the first season is about the love story of Adi and Nilu. Nilu Alagiyawanna and Kaushi Wijetunga are best friends. Kaushi's brother is Aditya Wijetunga, who is a broad-minded, progressive man who is always looking for solutions to people's problems. The trio have lived together since adolescence and their relationship grows through various events during school and university. Meanwhile, the love of Nilu and Adi is growing in their hearts. But after university life, Aditya serves as the Media Secretary to Mahasen Gunaratne, the Minister of Agriculture and Lands. Finally, Nilu and Aditya decided to get married. But, Aditya's car crashes on Engagement Day which led to memory loss.

Season two portrays the story of Primal Weerarathna's university life and his love triangle with Dushee and Priya. Primal comes from a low income family and he speaks on behalf of the poor. Eventually he starts a relationship with Priya. Unaware of their relationship, Dushee who is the daughter of the politician Mahasen Gunarathna, falls for Primal. But Primal rejects her due to her family status and caste. Meanwhile, Primal meets Adi at the university and they become best friends. The story continues with their love triangle and the obstacles they have to face due to their family backgrounds and caste.

== Cast ==
=== Main ===
- Randika Gunathilaka as Adithya Wijetunga
- Lahiruni Salwathura as Nilu Alagiyawenna
- Kalana Gunasekara as Primal
- Michelle Dilhara as Dushee
- Aishwarya S Varman as Priya
- Dushyantha Hettiarachchi as Ishan

=== Supportive cast ===
- Thanuja Jayawardana as Vasugi
- Priyantha Sirikumara as Mahasen Gunarathne
- Thilina de Silva
- Koralage Saman
- Manoja Fernando as Kaushi Wijetunga
- Rasadari Peiris as Adithya's mother
- Lakranga Hewawitharana
- Janaka Kumbukage
- Anuruddhika Padukkage as Shaama
- Gayani Gisanthika as Nilu's mother
- Kumara Jayakantha as Wijethunga
- Hyacinth Wijeratne
- Sampath Jayaweera as Sudewa Rathnasiri
- Devnaka Porage as Dilan
- Hemasiri Liyanage
- Harsha Prabath
- Manuaka Rathnayake
- Thilakshini Ratnayake as Teacher

== Critical response ==
First season of the series started as a mini series, but it became one of the most popular television shows during the airing. The TV series gained more viewers on television during the telecast. The theme song of the teledrama "Oya As Katha Karanawa" reached YouTube Trending #1 due to the popularity gained by the teledrama. Due to the huge popularity from the first season, the producers made the second season as a regular multi episode series.
