= Selvam (2011 film) =

- Film poster
- Sinhala: සෙල්වම්
- Directed by: Sanjaya Leelaratne
- Written by: Sanjaya Leelaratne
- Produced by: M. Mohamed
- Starring: Santhalingam Gokularaj; Shalani Tharaka; Malini Fonseka; Joe Abeywickrama
- Cinematography: Jayanath Gunawardena
- Music by: Sarath Wickrama & Ranga Dasanayake
- Distributed by: CEL Theatres
- Release date: 25 November 2011
- Country: Sri Lanka
- Language: Sinhala

Selvam (Sinhala: සෙල්වම්; lit. 'Prosperity') is a 2011 Sri Lankan Sinhala war drama film directed by Sanjaya Leelaratne and produced by M. Mohamed. It stars two debutants Santhalingam Gokularaj and Shalani Tharaka in lead roles along with Malini Fonseka and Joe Abeywickrama. Music composed by Rohana Weerasinghe. The main protagonist Pushparaja is played by Santhalingam Gokularaj, an ex-LTTE soldier. The director cast him after seeing him in a rehabilitation camp after the end of war. It is the 1166th film in the Sri Lankan cinema.

== Cast ==
- Denny Abinesh as Selvam
- Santhalingam Gokularaj as Pushparaja
- Shalani Tharaka as Medhavi
- Malini Fonseka as Madhuvani
- Joe Abeywickrama as Sathyawel
- Chandika Nanayakkara as Captain Migara
- Lakshman Mendis as Mathara Mudalali
- Jayani Senanayake as Vijitha, Mudalali's wife
- Sanjaya Leelaratne as Bhathiya
- Nadaraja Sivam
- Anuruddhika Dilrukshi
- N. Puvanalogany
- Sasindi Nawanga Hewapatha
- Bithum Chabee Chanakya
- Prabath Maduranga Jayawardhana ( Child actor)

== Soundtrack ==
No.	Title	Length
1.	"Nidahase Hiru Pipena"

== Awards ==
- 2011 Kuala Lumpur Film Festival Award for the Best Asian film of the year 2011
- 2011 Kuala Lumpur Film Festival Award for the Best Upcoming Director
