= Mati Kadulu =

2021 Sri Lankan teledrama

- title card
- මැටි කඩුලු
- Genre: Drama
- Created by: Nimal Rathnayake
- Directed by: Nimal Rathnayake
- Starring: Sarath Kothalawala; Michelle Dilhara; Jayasekara Aponsu; Jehan Appuhami
- Voices of: Lal Amarasiri; Sandasha Rathnayaka
- Opening theme: Boralu Pare
- Composer: Gayan Ganakadara
- Country of origin: Sri Lanka
- Original language: Sinhala with English subtitles
- No. of seasons: 1
- No. of episodes: 92

Production
- Executive producer: Marvan Ekanayaka
- Producer: Deshamanya Gaya Ekanayaka
- Cinematography: Nishantha Pradeep
- Editor: Jagath Weerathunga
- Running time: 20 to 23 minutes

Original release
- Network: Sri Lanka Rupavahini Corporation
- Release: January 11 – June 30, 2021

Mati Kadulu (Sinhala: මැටි කඩුලු) is a 2021 Sri Lankan thriller teledrama broadcast on Jathika Rupavahini. The series is directed and written by Nimal Rathnayake. It is produced by Deshamanya Gaya Ekanayaka and music direction is by Gayan Ganakadara. The serial stars Sarath Kothalawala and Michelle Dilhara in lead roles along with Jayasekara Aponsu, Jehan Appuhami, Ajith Lokuge and Udayanthi Kulathunga make supportive roles.

The telecasting starts on Rupavahini from Mondays to Thursdays at 9 pm from 11 January 2021. The serial became very popular after telecasting first few episodes.

== Plot ==
Kisaa, a high school dropout, is mentally accused when she was found pregnant with a dancing sir who had done ten marriages before. This creates a clash between Kisaa and his wife. The collide continues when Kisaa finds that he has neglect his theories besides the law in accordance to kill her with the cinnamon arc with her. The cinnamon represents pain while the condom represents sex.

== Cast and characters ==
- Sarath Kothalawala as Sekara
- Michelle Dilhara as Kisa
- Jayasekara Aponsu as Wilson
- Ajith Lokuge as Chandralal
- Udayanthi Kulathunga as Swarna
- Jehan Appuhami as Buddhika
- Wasanthi Ranwala as Asoka
- Melani Asoka as Sheela
- Anjana Premarathna as Rupasinghe
- Anuradha Edirisinghe as Heen Menika
- Pavithra Wickramasinghe as Seetha
- Rangi Rajapaksha as Raekani
- Sisira Thadikara as Scary man
- Chamikara Bokaregoda as Scary man's worker
- Sampath Athaudha as Sandun
- Ranil Prasad as Sarath
- Gaya Ekanayaka as Police Officer
- Sunil Dissanayake as Exocist
- Anton Cooray as Heen Menika's father
