= Emy (TV series) =

Sri Lankan television series

- ඒමි
- Genre: TV Series
- Written by: Ashoke Priyadarshana, Sudeepa Mihiri
- Directed by: Sanjaya Nirmal
- Starring: Michelle Dilhara; Hycinth Wijeratne; Maneesha Chanchala
- Theme music composer: Lassana Jayasekara
- Country of origin: Sri Lanka
- Original language: Sinhala
- No. of episodes: 55

Production
- Producer: Malathi Wijayasinghe
- Running time: 20 minutes per episode

Original release
- Network: Independent Television Network
- Release: 22 April – 5 July 2019

Emy (Sinhala: ඒමි) is a Sri Lankan television series broadcast on Independent Television Network, directed by Sanjaya Nirmal and produced by Malathi Wijayasinghe. The teledrama was shot in 2017 and released in 2019.

== Plot ==
Emy is a Sri Lankan born girl lived in UK is coming back to her mother country to visit her grandmother owing to a number of issues undergone inside her family. She who is coming from a broken family has been diagnosed with a fatal disease which is only known by her mother still residing in UK. She has several months left to live; but her grandmother is not aware of the fact. Emy’s grandmother, Daisy who is a retired psychiatrist gives shade to five children in her residence who have extraordinary capabilities. Five children named Kavindu, Sithija, Gagani, Timal and Pasindu grow up under the grandmother’s wings tend to be prosocial as per the instance of their grandmother. Emy’s advent makes the children frustrated and children plan to chase her away; but she gradually gets closer to them. Emy who has had a poor childhood and who has several months left to live, decides by herself to turn a new chapter in life thought her life slowly comes to an end. She who is not much concerned of her poor health condition as well as her bitter childhood experiences marches the group of five children towards the betterment of other psychologically disturbed children and adults. Emy and her friends extend their arms to those who are in need despite the obstacles rolling towards them.

== Cast and characters ==
- Michelle Dilhara as Emy
- Hyacinth Wijeratne as Grand Mother
- Maneesha Chanchala as Sara
- Tillakaratne Dilshan as Cricket Player
- Anuruddhika Padukkage
- Nuwangi Liyanage
- Samadara Ariyawansa
- Raja Pathirana
- Sangeeth Prabhu as Pawan

=== Child Artists ===
- Yohani Hansika as Gagani
- Naveen Saumya as Kavindu
- Venuka Joseph as Dimal
- Sharadh Chandracha as Sitige
