= Cyril Selvam =

Justice Cyril Thamarai Selvam

Justice, Madras High Court
- In office 31 Mar 2009 – Till Date

Additional Public Prosecutor, Madras High Court
- In office 23 June 2006 – 31 Mar 2009

Personal details
- Born: 9 February 1957 (age 69)
- Spouse: Helen

Cyril Thamarai Selvam is a judge in Madras High Court.

== Career ==
Selvam became judge of the Madras High Court when Karunanidhi was the Chief Minister of Tamil Nadu from 2006 to 2011. A couple of hours before taking oath as judge, Selvam called on Karunanidhi and got his blessings and this was revealed through a government press release with photograph by the Tamil Nadu government's Information Department. CT Selvam as appointed by M Karunanidhi and there are allegations that he aligns with the interest of M Karunanidhi and DMK.

In an interim order on the petition filed by news reader Mahalaxmi, Justice Selvam blocked the entire website www.savukku.net. This order on 28 Feb 2014 directly contradicts an earlier order by Madras High Court on 15 Apr 2012 against banning entire website instead of specific URLs.

Earlier in Feb, savukku.net had exposed the tapes of conversations between DMK MP Kanimozhi and former Additional Director General of Police (ADGP) Jaffer Sait, and Jaffer Sait and Kalaignar TV's former director Sharad Kumar and DMK President M Karunanidhi's Secretary K.Shanmuganathan and Jaffer Sait.
