= Menaka Rajapakse =

Sri Lankan actor

Menake Rajapakse මේනක රාජපක්ෂ
- Born: Walimuni Mudiyanselage Menake Hemaal Rajapakse; 24 May 1983 (age 43); Kelaniya, Sri Lanka
- Education: St Peter's College, Colombo
- Occupations: Actor, model
- Years active: 2005 - present
- Height: 5 ft 10 in (178 cm)
- Spouse(s): Virangi Siriwardena (2010-2013); Nehara Peiris (2014-present)
- Awards: Most Popular teledrama actor 2009, 2010, 2011; Peoples Youth Actor of the Year 2012

Walimuni Mudiyanselage Menake Hemaal Rajapakse (මේනක රාජපක්ශ: born 24 May 1983), popularly known as Menaka Rajapaksa, is a Sri Lankan teledrama and film actor as well as a model. He was first cast in 2005 as one of the main actors, but the role changed into a lead, in the teledrama Sanda Mudunata, which was telecast on Swarnavahini in 2005.

He had acted in more than 30 teledramas and 3 films as of 2015.

== Early life ==
Menake is the second child of his family. His father Ivan Rajapakse was an executive who worked in the hotel industry and died in 2004. His mother Zareena Allang, is a Malay and was a teacher at Wycherly International School. He is a past pupil of St. Peter's College, Colombo.

== Career ==
He was first sighted by a teledrama producer Samy Pavel during a SAAF Games in 2005. He is a competitive swimmer and broke a national level record.

In 2005, Menaka was selected for a main role in the teledrama Sanda Mudunata directed by Samy Pavel.

He became popular in 2008, in the teledrama Muthu Kirilli and then acted in many television serials such as Ran Dam Wal, Monara Kadadasi and Adare Ahasa Tharam. His first film was Sinhawalokanaya, a sport-drama film. He also acted in the crime thriller film Train to Kandy.

=== Selected television serials ===
- Adare Ahasa Tharam
- Ahas Maliga
- Ammawarune
- Amanda
- Ayemath Adaren
- Bharyawo
- Jeewa Chakra
- Kumee
- Monara Kadadasi
- Muthu Kirilli
- Nil Ahasa
- Pabalu Palama
- Ran Dam Wal
- Ralla Weralata Adarei
- Sanda Mudunata
- Sansara Sakmana
- Sidadiye Samanaliyo
- Sihina Piyapath
- Situ Medura
- Susumata Pawa Rahasin
- Tharu Piri Ahasa
- Wahinna Muthu Wassak

== Personal life ==
Menaka married Virangi Siriwardena in 2010. They divorced in 2013. He is married to fellow actress Nehara Peiris in 2014. Nehara and Menaka acted in lead roles on many occasions. They first met in Muthu Kirilli, and followed in Amanda, Bharyawo, Ammawarune, Situ Medura and others. The couple has two children.

== Filmography ==
Year	Film	Role	Ref.
2011	Sinhawalokanaya	Dhanuka Wickramasinghe	
2021	Apata Sadunu Ape Lokaya		
2024	Pirimi Adarayak		
