= Sidadiye Samanaliyo =

2023 Sri Lankan teledrama

- title card
- සිදාදියේ සමනලියෝ
- Genre: Drama, thriller, action, satire
- Created by: Aruna Jayawardena
- Directed by: Dhananjaya Siriwardena
- Starring: Yashoda Wimaladharma; Michelle Dilhara; Tharindi Fernando; Akila Dhanuddara
- Voices of: Hansi Balika; Ridmavi Anthony; Ishara Kalpani
- Theme music composer: Anjali Budawatte
- Opening theme: Gangak Unath Lassanai
- Composer: Thilina Ruhunuge
- Country of origin: Sri Lanka
- Original language: Sinhala
- No. of seasons: 1

Production
- Executive producer: Malinda Madhusanka
- Producer: Panduka Weerasekara
- Cinematography: Kapila Sugath
- Editor: EPIT Studios
- Running time: 20 to 23 minutes

Original release
- Network: Swarnavahini
- Release: January 11, 2021 – present

Sidadiye Samanaliyo (Sinhala: සිදාදියේ සමනලියෝ) is a 2023 Sri Lankan drama thriller teledrama broadcast on Swarnavahini. The series is directed by popular actor Dhananjaya Siriwardena in his directorial debut and written by Aruna Jayawardena. It is produced by Panduka Weerasekara and music directed is by Thilina Ruhunuge. The serial stars an ensemble cast of Yashoda Wimaladharma,Michelle Dilhara, Akila Dhanuddara, Tharindi Fernando, Manoja Fernando, Sajini Roy, and Woshika Perera in lead roles.

The media introduction of the teledrama was held at Nawala Grand Solis Restaurant on 22 April 2023. The telecasting started on Swarnavahini from Mondays to Fridays at 7.30 pm from 10 May 2023. The serial became very popular after telecasting first few episodes where first episode reached more than 800,000 views in YouTube.

== Plot ==
The teledrama portrays the life story of five different young girls: Malki, Disni, Anuradha, Revathi and Umali- who arrives to Colombo from five different areas just to find a decent career and earn a living. They are boarded in Mangalika's (played by Yashoda Wimaladharma) boarding house. The five young girls consider Mangalika as their sister, mother and friend. No matter what problems they face, all of them finally remains as one family facing all the life challenges together. Malki (played by Michelle Dilhara) who is a nurse in profession, works at Bernards house, taking care of Bernard (played by Vishwajith Gunasekara) who is in a wheelchair, and faces many challenges in an unfriendly environment. Disni (played by Tharindi Fernando) is a taxi driver. She meets a challenging customer, Wishwa (played by Akila Dhanuddara), who is CIA agent and involves in trapping arms dealers and gradually faces life threats. Anurada (played by Manoja Fernando) is a salon employee where she meets Migara (played by Ashen Siriwardena), a cricketer, and tends to start a relationship with him unknowingly. Revathi (played by Sajini Roy) is a chef and Umali (played by Woshika Perera) is a Singer.

== Cast and characters ==
- Yashoda Wimaladharma as Mangalika
- Michelle Dilhara as Malki
- Dhananjaya Siriwardena as CID agent
- Akila Danuddara as Wishwa
- Tharindi Fernando as Disni
- Manoja Fernando as Anurada
- Sajini Roy as Revathi
- Woshika Perera as Umali
- Ashen Siriwardena as Migara
- Anjana Premarathna as Sirimevan
- Menaka Rajapakse as Lawyer Sagara
- Vishwajith Gunasekara as Bernard
- Sidney Perera as Sidney, salon owner
- Hansamala Janaki as Malki's mother
- Roshan Ranawana in cameo appearance
- Sachithra Senanayake in cameo appearance
- Shyam Fernando in cameo appearance

=== Minor cast ===
- Dushyanthi Sewickrama as Gothami, Bernard's wife
- Sanjeeva Seneviratne as Revathi's Hotel manager
- Sewwandi Nadeeshani as Sewwandi, Anuradha's salon friend
- Heshan Malinga as Migara's friend
- Anil K. Wijesinghe as Bernard's worker
- Sameera Kekulandara
- Sumedha Mihiraj
- Isuru Rajapakse

== Production ==
The television serial made a directorial debut for popular award-winning actor Dhananjaya Siriwardena. The story is written by Aruna Jayawardena and Panduka Weerasekera is the producer. Kapila Sugath Wijeratne is the cinematographer, whereas Malinda Madhusankha contributed with production management and assistant direction and Nalinda Danaranjan as the still photography. Sampath Vanniarachchi is the art director and is assisted by Gihan Balarachchi. Nuwan Wijeratne and Chamara Hettiarachchi handled the costume department, whereas Samira Madu Kindelpitiya and Asanka Colambage are the make-up artists assisted by Hashan Thidelpitiya and Damith Hasalanka. Hair styling is done by Thushara Vidanagamage, production management by Malinda Panamura, and transportation was handled by Nishantha Warnasiri. Nirmala Weerasinghe and Roshan Weerasinghe are the technicians, whereas Wishwa de Silva and Saman Thilakasiri contributed with sound recording.
