= Salsapuna =

- Title card
- Genre: TV Series
- Directed by: Nalan Mendis
- Starring: Iranganie Serasinghe; Shanali Weerasinghe; Michelle Dilhara; Sangeeth Prabu Shankar; Damitha Abeyratne; Gayani Gisanthika; Rohana Baddage; Ramya Wanigasekara; Janaka Kumbukage; Amaya Adikari
- Country of origin: Sri Lanka
- Original language: Sinhala
- No. of episodes: 577 (final)

Production
- Producer: Susila Productions
- Running time: 20 minutes per episode (500 episodes)

Original release
- Network: Sirasa TV

Salsapuna(Sinhala: සල්සපුනා) also known as Sal Sapuna is a long running Sri Lankan television drama series broadcast on television network Sirasa TV and directed by Nalan Mendis. It is a drama about the conflicts between family members due to their social and political backgrounds. The character Podi Paththarakari (Sinhala: පොඩි පත්තරකාරී) portrayed by the actress Michelle Dilhara became popular among the Sri Lankan audience.

== Plot ==
The story begins when Aliya returns to Kethaliya's home. Prabath, Yamuna, Revathi Kethaliya and Nilhan live there. Yamuna and Prabath find difficulties in earning their living for, while Revathi finds proposals for her, the proposal never succeeded. Nilhan works as a journalist near the Narmada. Suren unwillingly married Judy tries his best to win the heart of Narmada, but fails in the face of utmost difficulty. The families face many problems while their mother, Kethaliya, and Aliya become helpless in every situation.

A few years later, Narmada marries Suren, but Suren's political background and Narmada's media background complicate their relationship. Aliya starts an affair with Vihanga but their families are enemies. Aliya and Vihanga elope, hoping to have a better family life on their own, but meet with an accident.

== Cast and characters ==
- Iranganie Serasinghe as old Aliya
  - Shanali Weerasinghe as young Aliya
- Roshan Pilapitiya as Kumara Premathilaka
- Michelle Dilhara - as Preethi - Podi Patharakari (Sinhala: පොඩි පත්තරකාරී)
- Sangeeth Prabu Shankar - as Nilhan
- Damitha Abeyratne - as Revathi
- Gayani Gisanthika - as Yamuna
- Rohana Beddage - as Nandapala Warnaweera
- Ramya Wanigasekara - as Kethaliya
- Janaka Kumbukage - as Prabath
- Amaya Adikari - as Narmada
- Ranil Kulasinghe - as Suren
- Gihani Weerasinghe - as Gihani
- Iresha Ranasinghe - as Judy
- Manel Wanaguru - as Shana
- Rangi Rajapaksha - as Krishni
- Dinindu Ekanayake - as Daham
- Madhava Wijesinghe - as Vihanga

== Characters ==
The character Podi Patharakari (Sinhala: පොඩි පත්තරකාරී) was introduced in the 250th episode by the director Nalan Mendis. The character was introduced as the girlfriend of Nilhan. Nilhan meets a new friend, Podi Patharakari played by Michelle Dilhara, who came from London to study journalism. She challenges Nilhan that she will be Narmada's best student. Meanwhile, Narmada opens her own office, recruiting Nilhan, Podi Patharakari, and Manual. Podi Patharakari and Nilhan gradually build up a friendship but tend to always fight. Podi Patharakari has feelings for Nilhan, but Nilhan ignores her. Therefore, Podi Patharakari challenges Nilhan saying that she will win his heart. Gradually Nilhan starts to have feelings for Podi Patharakari. The character Podi Patharakari (Sinhala: පොඩි පත්තරකාරී) portrayed by Michelle Dilhara,
