= Udumbara (film) =

Udumbara උදුම්බරා
- Directed by: K.S Chammanthraj
- Written by: K.S Chammanthraj
- Produced by: MTV Channel
- Starring: Jackson Anthony; Harshi Rasanga; Sarath Kothalawala; Hirunika Premachandra; Michelle Dilhara
- Cinematography: S. Bharathwaj
- Edited by: Babu A Srivastava
- Music by: Dhina
- Distributed by: Maharaja Entertainments
- Release date: 25 October 2018
- Country: Sri Lanka
- Language: Sinhala

Udumbara (Sinhala: උදුම්බරා) is a 2018 Sri Lankan Sinhalese sports drama film directed by K.S Chammanthraj and produced by MTV Channel as a Sirasa Movie. It stars Jackson Anthony Harshi Rasanga and a newcomer Nadeeshani Henderson in lead roles along with Sarath Kothalawala and Janaka Kumbukage. Music composed by Dhina. Member of Parliament Hon. Hirunika Premachandra made her acting debut. It is the 1314th Sri Lankan film in the Sinhalese cinema.

== Plot ==
Ananda, a sports coach in a rural village school, has become addicted to alcohol due to losing both his wife and his only son in a car accident. He then discovers a running prodigy named Udumbara in the local village school. Becoming interested in Udumbara's talent, Ananda successfully gives up drinking and sets about developing Udumbara's talent. Meanwhile, the court case against the driver of the car which killed Ananda's wife and son progresses, and the accused's sister meets Udumbara. The sister of the accused, known in the story as Mrs. Shanika, turns out to be a coach of some renown, and she, alongside Ananda, train Udumbara. Under their tutelage, Udumbara ends up winning the national championship. The story then progresses to Udumbara's victory in the international stage.

== Cast ==
- Jackson Anthony as Ananda
- Nadeeshani Henderson as Udumbara
  - Harshi Rasanga as Young Udumbara
- Sarath Kothalawala as Udumabara's father
- Jayani Senanayake as Udumbara's mother
- Janaka Kumbukage as Ananda's friend
- Hirunika Premachandra as Udumabara's national coach
- Sangeetha Basnayake as Ananda's wife
- Kaushalya Nirmana as Sachin, Ananda's son
- Michelle Dilhara as Michelle
- Upatissa Balasuriya as Lawyer Jinadasa
- Ryan Van Rooyen

== Soundtrack ==
The film consists of two songs composed by Dhina. The beats of the song "Udumbara" are based on "Shape of You".

No.	Title	Lyrics	Singer(s)	Length
1.	"Udumbara"	Sydney Chandrasekara	Pradeep Rangana, Shanika Madumali
2.	"Lanka Amma"	Sydney Chandrasekara	Pradeep Rangana, Shanika Madumali

== Accolades ==
Award	Category	Recipient(s)	Result
Derana Film Awards	Best Actor in a Leading Role	Jackson Anthony	Nominated
SIGNIS Awards (Sri Lanka) 2019	Creative Achievement	Nadeeshani Henderson	Won
