= Shalani Tharaka =

Sri Lankan actress (born 1990)

- ශලනි තාරකා
- Born: Gonakumbura Pangukarage Shalani Tharaka Wijayabandara; 15 November 1990 (age 35); Balangoda, Sri Lanka
- Education: Newstead Girls College
- Occupations: Actress, model, dancer, presenter, lyricist
- Years active: 2007 - present
- Parents: Susantha Wijayabandara (father); Suraji Fernando (mother)
- Awards: Best Actress; Most Popular Actress
- Website: Official Website

Gonakumbura Pangukarage Shalani Tharaka Wijayabandara, popularly known as Shalani Tharaka (born 15 November 1990), is a Sri Lankan actress and model. One of the most popular television actresses in Sri Lanka, Tharaka holds the title for the Sri Lankan beauty pageant Sirasa Kumariya which she won in 2007. Apart from acting, she is also a dancer, lyricist and author.

== Personal life ==
Shalani Tharaka was born on 15 November 1990 in Balangoda, Sri Lanka. Her mother Suraji Fernando is an actress in Sinhala cinema and television. Shalani completed education from Newstead Girls College, Negambo.

== Career ==
In 2007, when she was seventeen years old, she won the beauty pageant Sirasa Kumariya organized by Sirasa TV which brought her into mainstream popularity. Her maiden acting came through the television serial Poojasanaya directed by Sherly P. Delankawala. Her co-star in Poojasanaya was Suraj Mapa. Later she acted in many television serials in several genre such as Isuru Bawana, Hansi, Giridevi, Api Api Wage (I & II), Ganga Addara and Sanda Sanda Wage which gained popularity.

Apart from teledramas she has also contributed in the TV commercials for Hero Honda, Raino and Janet. She has also played parts in music videos such as Oya Dese by Prinyan, Mata Oya by D n S, Wasthuwe by Shafee ft. Delon.

In 2012, Tharaka made her maiden cinema appearance in the movie Selvam. She played the role of "Medhavi". Later she appeared in lead role in the horror film Spandana. She also contested in the second season of Sirasa Dancing Stars as well as Hiru Super Dancer.

On 19 September 2020, she was awarded both Best teledrama actress and Most popular teledrama actress at 16th Raigam Tele'es ceremony. It was the first time in 24 years where one actress won both awards at the same time. In 2021, she appeared in the Raffealla Fernando Celebrity Calendar along with many other Sri Lankan celebrities which is considered as one of the highest civilian honours awarded to an individual.

=== Selected television series ===
- A/L Iwarai
- Haara Kotiya

== Filmography ==
Key
†	Denotes films that have not yet been released

Year	Film	Roles	Ref.
2012	Selvam	Medhavi	
2016	Spandana	Mayumi	
2018	Nela	Nela	
2023	Viyasiduru	Taniya	
TBA	Adventures of Ricky Deen †	Star	
TBA	Saraa Susum †		

== Awards ==
=== Sumathi Awards ===
Year	Nominee / work	Award	Result
2015	Peoples' vote	Most Popular Actress	Won
2015	Handapana Gala	Best Upcoming Actress	Won
2018	Peoples' vote	Most Popular Actress	Won

=== Raigam Tele'es ===
Year	Nominee / work	Award	Result
2015	Punchi Walawwa	Jury Award	Won
2016	Peoples' vote	Most Popular Actress	Won
2020	Peoples' vote	Most Popular Actress	Won
2020	Ado	Best Actress	Won
2022	Kiya Denna Adare Tharam	Most Popular Actress	Won

=== Derana Film Awards ===
Year	Nominee / work	Award	Result
2019	Peoples' vote	Lux Glamorous Star	Won

=== SIGNIS OCIC Awards ===
Year	Nominee / work	Award	Result
2021	Giridevi	Best Actress	Won
