= National Youth Icon Award =

Award is given to individuals who contribute towards social welfare

- Country: India
- Presented by: International Youth Committee
- First award: 2016
- Website: www.saarcyouth.org

The National Youth Icon Award is awarded annually by the International Youth Committee (IYC), a United Nations accredited organization, at the World Youth Summit. The award is given for the young people globally in recognition of their development work and their contribution towards developing a peaceful, fairer, prosperous and sustainable future that meets the Sustainable Development Goals (SDGs) of United Nations.

Launched in the year 2016, the World Youth Summit honors young people who have made significant contributions in professional or voluntary capacity covering areas such as poverty reduction, democracy, conflict resolution and prevention, environmental preservation, community service and social development. The National Youth Icon Award consists of a Gold Pin Medal, a citation and a scroll.

== History ==
The National Youth Icon award was first introduced in 2016 by the International Youth Committee (IYC), which is an organization accredited by the United Nations. The award is conferred to 70 young individuals globally, setting high standards for their inspiring work and services contributed towards achieving the (SDGs) of the United Nations.The award gives an international recognition to these individuals who dedicated their lives to communities, nations and the world. Powerful, outstanding & influential youth role models in the fields of social work, education, human rights, peace, philanthropy, business, sports, health, entertainment, youth empowerment, and popular arts and culture are honored with the National Youth Icon Award. In 2017 the International Youth Committee (IYC) also introduced the Asia Inspiration Award for recognizing the inspirational achievements of young individuals in Asia.

== Criteria ==
 The nominee must have been engaged in development work for more than 12 months, either in a professional or voluntary capacity;  The nominee must be an Indian citizen and the development work must be taking place in any state or union territories of the country. Foreign nationals also can apply from this year;  The nominee should not be older than 40 as on 31 August 2020;  Individuals can nominate themselves or be nominated by someone who can accurately describe their development work;  The winners must agree to take part in publicity generated by the IYC.

Awards will be decided on the basis of: 1. Level of Impact; 2. Level of innovation/fresh approaches to problem solving; 3. Quality of achievement; 4. Quality of the evidence provided. 5. Sustainability

== Award Value ==
National Youth Icon Award consists of a Gold Pin Medal, a citation and a scroll. The top award carries Rs. 100,000 (Rupess One Lakh Only) with a citation, a special seal and a gold medal which will be given to only one best of the best from among the winners as “IYC Young Person of the Year”.

== Date of Award Ceremony ==
22 February 2021 in New Delhi, India, in a ceremony in the presence of foreign guests and high-level dignitaries, guests and speakers.

== National Youth Icon Award 2019 ==
The World Youth Summit 2019 was held on 27 September 2019, at the Constitution Club of India, New Delhi, under the theme of "Achieving SDGs by 2030: Moving from Policy to Action." 81 young individuals who were performed to be the next leaders across the world conferred with the National Youth Icon Award 2019 by International Youth Committee (IYC). Dignitaries such as Gaur Gopal Das (International life coach), Dr. Arunabha Bhattacharjee (40 Under 40 HRs in Asia), Ms. Nusrat Jahan, Actor & Honorable MP of Republic of India, Breshna Musazai from Afghanistan and Dinesh Subasinghe joined the World Youth Summit 2019.
