= Lindula =

- Town
- Location in Sri Lanka
- Coordinates: 6°54′04″N 80°40′10″E
- Country: Sri Lanka
- Province: Central Province
- District: Nuwara Eliya District
- Time zone: +5.30

Lindula is a town located in the Nuwara Eliya District, Central Province of Sri Lanka. Together with Talawakele it is administered by the Talawakele-Linduala Urban Council.
