= Disasekara =

Disasekara is a Sinhalese surname. Notable people with the surname include:

- Narada Disasekara (1933–2010), Sri Lankan classical singer
- Saranga Disasekara (born 1983), Sri Lankan actor, singer, model and host
