= Douglas Ranasinghe =

Sri Lankan actor

Douglas Ranasinghe ඩග්ලස් රණසිංහ
- Born: Morathennage Douglas Ranasinghe; May 27, 1945 (age 81); Kurunegala, Sri Lanka
- Education: St. Anne's College, Kurunegala
- Occupations: Actor, Dramatist, Director, Writer, Broadcaster
- Years active: 1967–present
- Known for: Acting
- Spouse: Sandya Kumari Ranasinghe
- Children: Shribodhi Indrakheela Ranasinghe
- Relatives: Thilaka Ranasinghe (sister); Narada Disasekara (brother-in-law); Saranga Disasekara (nephew)

Morathennage Douglas Ranasinghe (born May 27, 1945, Sinhala: ඩග්ලස් රණසිංහ), is an actor in Sri Lankan cinema, theater, and television. He acted in many supportive roles in movies including Akkara Paha, Yuganthaya, Viragaya, Sri Siddhartha Gautama and Dharmayuddhaya.

== Personal life ==
Douglas Ranasinghe was born on 27 May 1945 in Thorawathura village, Kurunegala as the fourth child of the family. His father, James Ranasinghe, was a landowner and planter where he also served as a Village Head and Village Administration Secretary as well. His mother Seelawathi Valimuni was a teacher. Douglas was educated at St. Anne's College, Kurunegala. He is a fluent speaker of the College Sinhala and English Debating Team, a boxer, a member of the Cadet Corps and an athlete. He topped the 200 meters as a long distance runner and was also a short story writer.

The Ranasinghe couple had seven children. The eldest in the family, Malkanthi Gunaratne was also a writer and married to the owner of Maradana Ratna Book Publishing Company, L. A. Gunaratne. The second is Rupa Khemaratne, an English teacher. The third was Prema Srimathi worked as a Teacher Training Housing Superintendent in Ihalagama. The fifth is Lionel, a planter. Chandrara Siriwardena is the sixth child who served in the Ports Authority. Youngest one is Thilaka Ranasinghe, an actress and broadcaster. Thilaka Ranasinghe worked at Sri Lanka Broadcasting Corporation. Thilaka was married to singer Narada Disasekara. The couple has one son Saranga Disasekara, an actor in Sinhala cinema and television. Saranga was married to popular actress Dinakshie Priyasad.

He studied at St. Anne's College, Kurunegala, and excellent in sports. After the school, he was interested to become a lawyer and applied for Law College. However, then he applied for the post of Sub Inspector. He failed twice, but succeeded in third attempt. He was then transferred to a training course at Kalutara.

Ranasinghe is married to Sandya Kumari, and the couple has one son, Shribodhi Indrakeela.

== Career ==
Douglas came to Colombo from Kurunegala in 1966 to meet playwright Sathischandra Edirisinghe with his close relative Peter Amarasinghe. Then he got a character certificate from Edirisinghe for a police service interview. However, Edirisinghe brought Douglas to Henry Jayasena for his play. He was chosen to play the role in stage drama Hunuwataye Kathawa by Henry Jayasena. This turned him towards the drama career. He acted in many critically acclaimed stage plays including Henry Jayasena's Apata Puthe Magak Nathe and Ediriweera Sarachchandra's Hotabari Yuddhe. He also appeared in the plays: Dunḍu Berē, Janēlaya, Kuvēṇi, The wedding, Taming of the Sorrow and Ahas Māḷigā. His last stage drama acting was Kusa Pabawathi.

His maiden cinema acting came through 1970 film Akakra Paha, however his second film Romeo Juliet Kathawak directed by G. D. L. Perera released before Akkara Paha. He acted in the short film Bhavana, directed by the Paul Zils. With that film, he was able to entered into the Berlin Film Festival of 1970/1971. Then he completed a three-year course at the London School of Filmmaking. After the course, he was asked to stay back and take part in Shakespearean productions. However, he refused the offer and landed to Sri Lanka.

In 1980s, he was the voice actor in the programs Guwan Viduli Ranga Madala and Keti Katha produced by Sugathapala de Silva. As a radio sound administrator, he recorded high drama, feature and music programs. He has directed few stage plays and television serials including Ranmasu Uayana and Sasara Chakra respectively. As a television actor, he made notable roles in the serials: Avasanda, Maṭa Mahalu Vayasē, Ranmasu Uyana and Kaḷu Hansayō. He attended a three-year course at the International Film School in London, where he wrote the screenplay for the film Dancing Devils.

=== Selected television serials ===
- Akuru Maki Na
- Dedunu Sihina
- Ganga Addara
- Indrakeelaya
- Ithin Eelangata
- Punaragamanaya
- Ranga Soba
- Ran Poruwa
- Ridee Tharaka
- Samanala Sihinaya
- Samanala Wasanthaya
- Sanda Siththam
- Sandali Saha Radika
- Sandawathaka Waruna
- Sangeethe
- Sapiriwara
- Sewwandi
- Suwanda Hamana Manamali
- Thodu
- Wehi Pabalu Sela

== Filmography ==
Key
†	Denotes films that have not yet been released

Year	Film	Role	Ref.
1969	Romeo Juliet Kathawak	Romeo	
1970	Akkara Paha	Samarasena	
1981	Saranga	Suresh	
1982	Thana Girawi	Rathnapala	
1982	Kele Mal	Tissa	
1983	Siw Ranga Sena	Janaka	
1984	Adara Geethaya	Thushara	
1984	Niwan Dakna Jathi Dakwa		
1985	Wathsala Akka		
1985	Du Daruwo		
1985	Yuganthaya	Aravinda	
1987	Viragaya	Siridasa	
1992	Kulageya		
1994	Yuwathipathi	Janaraja	
1994	Le livre de cristal	Siri de Silva	
1996	Hiru Sanduta Mediwi		
1996	Amanthaya		
2000	Indrakeelaya		
2003	Irasma	Sonali's husband	
2001	Aswesuma	Senior Police Officer	
2006	Ammawarune	Divisional Secretary	
2008	Adara Meena		
2013	Sri Siddhartha Gautama	King Suppabuddha	
2016	Weerawarna	Ayesha's father	
2016	Zoom	Father of two daughters	
2017	Aloko Udapadi	Thanasiwa	
2017	Dharmayuddhaya	Upali	
2018	Nidahase Piya DS	Richard Aluwihare	
2022	CineMa	Sagara Premachandra	
2023	Visangamanaya	Dissanayake	
2026	Dharmayuddhaya 2	Upali Samaranayake	
TBA	Rajadahana †		
