= Soorya (film) =

2025 Sri Lankan action thriller film

- Sinhala: සූර්යා
- Directed by: Mahesh Munasinghe
- Written by: Ronald Dasanayaka
- Produced by: Dinesh Muthugala
- Starring: Janith Wickramage; Nihari Perera; Mike Fernando; Dilhani Ekanayake; Isuru Lokuhettiarachchi
- Cinematography: Rangana Bandara
- Edited by: Roshan Edward
- Release date: 12 July 2025
- Language: Sinhala

Soorya (Sinhala: සූර්යා) is a 2025 Sri Lankan Sinhalese action thriller film directed by Mahesh Munasinghe and produced by Dinesh Muthugala. The film stars Janith Wickramage and Nihari Perera in lead roles, while Dilhani Ekanayake, Mike Fernando and Isuru Lokuhettiarachchi made supportive roles.

The film was released on 12 July 2025 and has received positive reviews from audience and critics.

== Cast ==
- Janith Wickramage as Soorya Swarnajeeva
- Nihari Perera as Neha Ranthilake
- Dilhani Ekanayake as Nirupa Swarnajeewa, Soorya's mother
- Mike Fernando as Daya Swarnajeewa, Soorya's Father, the divisional secretary
- Sanath Gunathilake as Minister Wanshanatha
- Ajith Weerasinghe as Willie Mahagama, Media head
- Isuru Lokuhettiarachchi as Inspector Kamal
- Kamal Deshapriya as Ranthilake, Neha's father
- Sangeetha Basnayake as Malika Ranthilake, Neha's mother
- Dinesh Muthugala as Inspector Rohan Rathnayake, Police OIC
- Sachin Chathuranga as Rockey, Soorya's friend
- Sangeeth Prabhu as Sammy, Soorya's friend
- Lasantha Udukumbura as Anwer, the juice maker
- Sudheeksha Samadhi as Vonisha
- Harshika Ratnayake as Governor
- Asanka Neelawattura as Lawyer Galkanda
- Rukman Thilakarathne as Bandara, Swarnajeewa's secretary
- Dasunika Wickramasinghe as Minister secretary

== Production ==
This is the second cinema direction by Mahesh Munasinghe after his 2019 blockbuster Rush. The film is produced by popular biology tutor Dinesh Muthugala, where he also made a supportive role. The script is written by Ronald Dasanayaka where Niroshan Edirimanna and Indunil Daraniyagala are the assistant directors. Eranda Dewanarayana is the production manager and Sanka Bandara is the line producer.

Cinematographer is Rangana Bandara and editor, colour mixer is Roshan Edward. Art Direction handled by Nuwan Sanurankha and choreography by Sara Abeywardhana. Priyantha Dissanayake is the make-up artist, Saman Bandara Ihalagama is the stunt director and Janaka Ullandupitiya with costume designing. Sound designed by Sasika Ruwan Marasinghe and VFX by Mahesh Buddhika.
