= 37th Sarasaviya Awards =

2026 awards festival for Sinhala cinema

- Date: September 9, 2026
- Site: Nelum Pokuna, Colombo, Sri Lanka
- Hosted by: Saman Athahudahetti

Highlights
- Most awards: Ayu
- Most nominations: Ayu

Television coverage
- Network: Associated Newspapers of Ceylon Limited

The 37th Sarasaviya Awards festival (Sinhala: 37වැනි සරසවිය සම්මාන උලෙළ), presented by the Associated Newspapers of Ceylon Limited, honored the best films of 2025 Sinhala cinema, held on September 09, 2026, at the Nelum Pokuna, Colombo. The ceremony was hosted by Saman Atahdudahetti. Prime Minister Dr. Harini Amarasuriya was the chief guest.

== Popular Awards ==
- Most Popular Film - Moda Tharindu
- Most Popular Actor - Damith Wijayathunga
- Most Popular Actress - Sandra Mack

== Lifetime Achievement & Special Honors ==
- Hemasiri Sellapperuma (Veteran Filmmaker)
- Nita Fernando (Veteran Actor)
- T. M. Jayaratne (Popular Singer)
- MMA Haq (Musician)

== 2025 awards ==
Category	Film	Recipient
Best Film	Bahuchithawadiya	Malaka Dewapriya
Best Script	Bahuchithawadiya	Malaka Dewapriya
Best Direction	Ayu	Chathra Weeraman
Best Actor	Walanpuri	Priyantha Sirikumara
Best Actress	Aye	Sandra Mark
Best Supporting Actor	Nelum Kuluna	Thusitha Laknath
Best Supporting Actress	Nelum Kuluna	Chandani Seneviratne
Best Cinematographer		
Best Lyricist	Ayu	Chnatha Dharmadasa
Best Music Director	Ayu	Mininda Thennakoon
Best Song		Chinthaka Jayakodi
Best Playback Singer		
Best Playback Songstress		
Best Editor		
Best Sound Designer		
Best Art Director		
Best Make-up Artist		
Best Actor in a Comedy Role		
Best Upcoming Actor	Bahuchithawadiya	Kalana Gunasekara
Maximum Audience Response		
Best Dance Direction	Moda Tharidu	Kavindu Madushan
