= Nathi Bari Tarzan =

- Sinhala: නැති බැරි ටාසන්
- Directed by: Sudesh Wasantha Pieris
- Written by: Sudesh Wasantha Pieris
- Produced by: Triple A Creations
- Starring: Tennyson Cooray; Rajitha Hiran; Menaka Maduwanthi
- Cinematography: Gamini Moragollagama
- Edited by: Anura Bandara
- Music by: Keshan Perera
- Distributed by: CEL Theatres
- Release date: 22 February 2019
- Country: Sri Lanka
- Language: Sinhala

Nathi Bari Tarzan (Sinhala: නැති බැරි ටාසන්) is a 2019 Sri Lankan Sinhala comedy film directed by Sudesh Wasantha Pieris and produced by Athila Wickramsooriya for Triple A Creations. It is the third installment of Weda Beri Tarzan franchise, and sequel to 2008 film Wada Bari Tarzan Mathisabayata. Tennyson Cooray reprise his role as Tarzan and Menaka Maduwanthi in lead roles along with Rajitha Hiran and Isuru Lokuhettiarachchi. Music composed by Keshan Perera. It is the 1323rd Sri Lankan film in the Sinhala cinema.

== Plot ==
Tarzan's (Tennyson) life in the city was bitter. Thousands of times he wondered how good his life was. Therefore, Tarzan move back to the jungle. Merzon (Rajitha) is Tarzan's best friend. Meanwhile, Isuru (Isuru) and his treasure hunters enter the jungle and are currently digging the jungle and looking for treasure. They want a firstborn girl. It is in the meantime that many boys and girls including Vindya (Menaka) come to the forest. While they are having fun, Vindya accidentally meets Tarzan. Knowing that she is a first-born girl, Tarzan was determined to protect her from treasure hunters.

== Cast ==
- Tennyson Cooray as Tarzan
- Menaka Maduwanthi as Vindya
- Rajitha Hiran as Merzon
- Isuru Lokuhettiarachchi as Isuru
- Manjula Moragaha
- Dilki Mihiraji
- Lakshman Amarasekara
- Mahinda Ihalagamage as Dagara
- Hemantha Iriyagama as Bullet
- Don Leela
- Sarath Samarawickrama
