= Yash Weerasinghe =

Sri Lankan actor and voice actor (born 1992)

Yash Weerasinghe යශ් වීරසිංහ
- Born: Sachithra Yashminda Weerasinghe; April 27, 1992 (age 34); Colombo, Sri Lanka
- Relatives: Dulanjan Rashminda Weerasinghe (brother) Rathna Lalani Jayakody (aunt); Geetha Kanthi Jayakody (aunt); Paboda Sandeepani (cousin) Bimal Jayakody (cousin)
- Website: yashweerasinghe.com

Sachithra Yashminda Weerasinghe (Sinhala: සචිත්‍ර යෂ්මින්ද වීරසිංහ; born 27 April 1992), professionally known as Yash Weerasinghe, is a Sri Lankan actor and voice actor. He is known for his appearances in television dramas including Wes, Ravana, Bro, and Kiya Den Adare Tharam. In addition to television acting, he has worked as a dubbing artist for Sinhala-language adaptations of foreign television series, including Carnation, Diya Aur Baati Hum, and Descendants of the Sun. He later appeared in the feature film Paraga, directed by Danushka Rathnayaka. Weerasinghe is a member of the Jayakody family of artists and is a nephew of actress Geetha Kanthi Jayakody.

== Early life ==
Weerasinghe was born in Colombo, Sri Lanka, to Jayantha Weerasinghe and Muditha Jayakody. He is the second of three children, with an elder brother, Dulanjan Rashminda Weerasinghe, and a younger sister, Upadya Mandira Weerasinghe, Aunt Geetha Kanthi Jayakody. He received his primary and secondary education at Bomiriya Munidasa Kumaratunga Vidyalaya and Bomiriya Central College, where he studied in the mathematics stream for his General Certificate of Education Advanced Level examination. He later pursued a diploma in Automobile Engineering at Scott Campus.

== Career ==
Weerasinghe began his acting career with minor roles in television dramas, including Para Walalu. In 2016, he appeared in the television drama Mauna Yagaya, directed by Danushka Rathnayaka, portraying the character Kosala. He subsequently appeared in television productions including Eka Gei Minissu and Wes, in which he portrayed Madawa.

He later appeared in several television dramas, including Heily, Ravana, Bro , Kiya Denna Adare Tharam, as Anaraga. He subsequently expanded his acting career into cinema with a role in the film Paraga, directed by Danushka Rathnayaka.

== Filmography ==
Films

Year	Title	Role
2019	Vijayaba Kollaya (film)	Mayadunna
2022	Ae	Madhawa
2026	Paraaga	

Selected Television Serials

- Para Walalu
- Mauna Yaagaya 2016
- Eka Gei Minissu 2017
- Wes 2018
- Ravana 2018
- Heily 2019
- Bro 2020
- Snap 2021
- Kiya Denna Adare Tharam 2021
- Api Eka Rane 2023
- Sansarini 2023
- Wisekari 2024
- Main Character 2024
- 24 Love Story 2025
- Sandy 2025
- Aaley 2025
- Duvili 2026

== Dubbing ==
Weerasinghe began his dubbing career in 2015 at the Sri Lanka Rupavahini Corporation under the guidance of Wajira Kumara Vithanage. His first dubbing role was the character Mathako in the Sinhala adaptation of the Japanese television drama Carnation, broadcast under the title Aththatu Na Etha Eya Igilei . He later became involved in dubbing productions broadcast on TV Derana. Since then, he has contributed voice performances to numerous Sinhala-language adaptations of foreign television dramas.

== Music Career ==
Year	Songs
2026	Oba Awidin
2025	Husma Suwada
