= Senasuru Maruwa =

- Film poster
- Sinhala: සෙනසුරු මාරුව
- Directed by: Udayakantha Warnasuriya
- Written by: Tissa Abeysekara
- Produced by: Udayakantha Warnasuriya; Ranjith Jayasooriya; Pravin Jayarathne
- Starring: Channa Perera; Sheshadri Priyasad; Buddhika Jayarathna
- Cinematography: K D Dayananda
- Edited by: Pravin Jayarathne
- Music by: Dillon Lamb
- Production company: Dil Films International
- Release date: 11 October 2012
- Running time: 90 minutes
- Country: Sri Lanka
- Language: Sinhala

Senasuru Maruwa (Sinhala: සෙනසුරු මාරුව) is a 2012 Sri Lankan Sinhala action drama film directed by Udayakantha Warnasuriya and co-produced by Udayakantha Warnasuriya, Ranjith Jayasooriya and Pravin Jayarathne. It stars Channa Perera and Sheshadri Priyasad in lead roles along with Buddhika Jayarathna and Lucky Dias. Music composed by Dillon Lamb. It is the 1167th Sri Lankan film in the Sinhala cinema.

The film has been shot in and around Dambulla, Mullative in October 2010.

== Cast ==
- Lucky Dias as Mahil
- Channa Perera as Nisal
- Sheshadri Priyasad as Anuththara
- Buddhika Jayarathna as Viraj
- Nadeeka Gunasekara as Anuththara's mother
- Kanthi Lanka as Viraj's mother
- Indika Ginige as Ranjan
- Nimal Anthony
- Ajith Weerasinghe
- Senaka Wijesinghe
- Sampath Jayaweera
- Mervyn Dhanawardena Guruge as Minister

== Soundtrack ==
No.	Title	Lyrics	Singer(s)	Length
1.	"Muthulel Wimane"	Sunil Wimalaweera	Rookantha Gunathilaka

== Awards ==
- 2013 Derana Lux Film Festival Award for the Best Villain - Buddhika Jayaratne
- 2013 Derana Lux Film Festival Award for the Best Action Direction - Teddy Vdyalankara
- 2013 Derana Lux Film Festival Award for the Best Lyrics - Sunil Wimalaweera
