= Sihinayaki Adare =

Sihinayaki Adare සිහිනයකි ආදරේ
- Directed by: Sarov Shanmugam; Donald Jayantha
- Story by: Atlee
- Produced by: Raja Sadesh Kumar; Srimathi Sadesh Kumar
- Starring: Hemal Ranasinghe; Pooja Umashankar; Uddika Premarathna; Sheshadri Priyasad
- Cinematography: Vignesh Vasu
- Edited by: Ashok Kumar
- Music by: Pasan Liyanage
- Production company: Real Image
- Distributed by: EAP Films
- Release date: 18 January 2024
- Country: Sri Lanka
- Language: Sinhala

Sihinayaki Adare (Love is a Dream) (Sinhala: සිහිනයකි ආදරේ) is a 2024 Indian-Sri Lankan Sinhalese language romantic drama film co-directed by Sarov Shanmugam and Donald Jayantha. The film is co-produced by Raja Sadesh Kumar and Srimathi Sadesh Kumar. It stars Hemal Ranasinghe and Pooja Umashankar (in her comeback role) in lead roles along with Uddika Premarathna, Sheshadri Priyasad, Lucky Dias, Mahendra Perera in supportive roles. The film is the remake of 2013 Indian Tamil film Raja Rani directed by Atlee.

== Plot ==
The film revolves around Rehan and Jennifer, who married without the interest, but face many challenges in their disturbing change of lives.

== Cast ==
- Hemal Ranasinghe as Rehan Bernard
- Pooja Umashankar as Jennifer Fernandez
- Uddika Premarathna as Ajith Bandara
- Sheshadri Priyasad as Divya
- Lucky Dias as Ronnie Fernandez, Jennifer's father
- Mihira Sirithilaka as Noel, Ajith's friend
- Jayantha Athapatthu as Vicky, Rehan's friend
- Mahendra Perera as Rehan's boss
- Damitha Abeyratne as Varuni Fernando, the marriage registrar
- Himali Siriwardena as Mario's ex-girlfriend
- Ananda Wickramage as Divya's father
- Sunoj Kumar Fernando as Mario Hathurusinghe
- Sriyantha Mendis as Bandara, Ajith's father
- Thisuri Yuwanika as Jennifer's friend
- Vinu Udani Siriwardhana as Kumari, Jennifer's office friend
- Shehani Kahandawala as Nirosha, Divya's friend
- Meena Kumari as Doctor
- Suneetha Wimalaweera as Maithree madam
- Gayesha Perera as hospital receptionist
- Kumara Thirimadura as drunken person
- Hemantha Iriyagama as Police inspector
- Ronnie Leitch as Head of call centre
- Sarath Dikkumbura as Police officer
- Anura Bandara Rajaguru as Security of the flat
- Shiromika Fernando as Sandya
- Manchana Tharaka Peiris as Rehan's friend

== Production ==
South Indian director Sarov Shanmugam and Sri Lankan director Donald Jayantha are the co-directors of the film. Donald Jayantha also holds the record as the assistant director of the most number of films in Sinhala cinema as well. Sarov and Jayantha previously directed the film Maya 3D in 2016. Raja Sadesh Kumar and Srimathi Sadesh Kumar co-produced the film for the second time with directors after Maya 3D. Raja Sadesh Kumar also made the story and screenplay and Srimathi Sadesh Kumar also contributed with costume design. Assistant directors are Janaka Chamara and Niroshan Edirimanna, where line Producers are Darshan K, Dinesh Subhas and Praveen Ramesh Babu.

Cinematography done by Vignesh Vasu, edited by Ashok Kumar and art direction by Manjula Ayagama. Sound Management by Diran Wijeyasinghe, product management by Ashoka Ariyaratne and feature composition by Sameera Madhu Kidelpitiya. Nishantha Kumara Dharmadasa and Susara Sampath Balasuriya made costume design assistance to Srimathi Sadesh Kumar. Ruchira Dinesh Kahanda is the hair stylist, Dinesh Kumar is the choreographer, and Sandesh Bandara, Ajith Premalal are still photographers.

Music direction and songs composed by Pasan Liyanage, where Tirone Perera and Yashoda Adhikari are the lyricists. Tharuka Gunaratne, Kanishka Peiris, Diran Wijesinghe, Hirushi Jayasena, Dinelka Muthuarachchi and Chethana Ketagoda made background vocals.

Shooting of the film started in 2019, but stopped midway with many reasons including COVID-19.

== Release ==
The film was released on 18 January 2024 in EAP circuit cinemas. Apart from that, the film was released in Melbourne theatres from 21 January to 4 February: on 21 January at Fountaingate, on 28 January at Glen Waverley, on 28 January at South Morang and on 4 February at Werribee respectively.
