= Ae (film) =

2022 Sri Lankan film

- Sinhala: ඈ
- Directed by: Eranga Senaratne
- Written by: Dinali Roshanthi Senaratne
- Based on: Story by Eranga Senaratne
- Produced by: Ananda S. Liyanage; Sujith Liyanage
- Starring: Umeshi Wickramasinghe; Yash Weerasinghe; Manel Wanaguru; Darshan Dharmaraj; Chalani Balasuriya
- Cinematography: Daya Suriyaarachi
- Edited by: Dasun Ranasinghe
- Music by: N.M.J. Vasayilavo
- Distributed by: Online platform
- Release date: August 12, 2022
- Country: Sri Lanka
- Language: Sinhala

Ae (She) (Sinhala: ඈ) is a 2022 Sri Lankan Sinhala drama film directed by Eranga Senaratne and co-produced by Ananda S. Liyanage and Sujith Liyanage. The film stars Umeshi Wickramasinghe and Yash Weerasinghe in lead roles, whereas Manel Wanaguru, Darshan Dharmaraj and Chalani Balasuriya made supportive roles.

For the first time in the history of Sinhala cinema, the film Ae took a single letter name and went out of the traditional cinemas with a different story theme. The film was screened on the Cinema Ceylon platform. The audience in 42 countries can watch the film online through this method, which is displayed outside of the standard method of cinema screening in film halls. The film received mixed reviews from critics.

== Plot ==
Jeevani is a beautiful twenty-three year old Tamil girl who comes to work as a servant to take care of an elderly woman who lives alone in a spacious bungalow in the center of Colombo. She loves to come to Colombo to fulfill her dream of seeing the popular movie star Dilhani Ekanayake in person. This is because of the desire to see the actress who had come to Jeevani's Talawakele estate for a shoot. She also has some photographs taken there. One day Jeevani calls a taxi cab to take a woman who suddenly falls ill for treatment. During that journey, Madhava, the young driver of the taxi, develops a fondness for Jeevani's mannerisms and her looks.

Madhava fell in love with Jeevani. He is a university-educated Sinhala Buddhist educated young man born in the south, who was arrested and released on remand for interfering in a political struggle in the university student movement. He comes to Colombo with the intention of fleeing to a foreign country to seek political asylum. One day he was caught by the police while transporting illegal drugs in a taxi. There he leaves the vehicle and runs away. Where he knows no one in the city, he seeks Jeevani's help. She hides Madhava in a storage room in the bungalow. Just like the law, the drug dealers are also after Madhava. When Madhava falls in love with his dreams, Jeevani takes a tough decision to make his dreams come true.

== Cast ==
- Umeshi Wickramasinghe as Jeevani
- Yash Weerasinghe as Madhava
- Manel Wanaguru
- Darshan Dharmaraj
- Chalani Balasuriya
- Dilhani Ekanayake as herself
- Shantha Gunawardena
- Saman Almeida
- Kiran G. Zoysa
- Ananda Liyanage
- Jayanthi Liyanage
- Sujith Liyanage
- Prathanna Sevvandi
- Milton Sebastian
- Uresha Rangani
- Sadushan Padmaraja
- Nihal Premachandra
- Omal Nayana Wijeratne
- Rukshika Godage
- Varsha Suriyarachchi
- Saduni Nisansala Fernando
- Jayanthi De Silva
- Metthananda Withanage
- Keerthi Ranjith Peiris
- Champi Sirinayake

== Production ==
The film marked the eighth cinema direction by Eranga Senaratne, where he entered the film industry with the movie Surayahana Gini Gani which was screened in the year 1999. This was followed by Ginigath Madhu Samaya (2000), Rosa Patikki (2002)), Sinasuna Adaren (2009), Sweet Angel (2011), None Mage Sudu None (2015), and Mona Lisa (2022).

The story concept is by Eranga Senaratne and co-produced by Ananda S. Liyanage with Sujith Liyanage. Screenplay, dialogues and lyrics by Dinali Roshanthi Senaratne, cinematography and lighting by Daya Suriyarachchi, assistant direction by Chandana Edirisinghe and editing done by Dasun Ranasinghe. Camera Assistant is Nilantha Perera where Narada Pannipitiya and Sanjeeva Rohana worked as technicians. Make-up and hair styling done by Lahiru Nishan along with Janadara Alutgama whereas Composition assistance by Prasad Udugamasooriya, art direction by Suranga Pradeep Kumar assisted by Ajith Galagedara. Shan Perera made the choreography, Anuruddha Basnayake made sound management and 5.1 sound mixing. Coloring done by Shawn Alvis in Shaw Studio, music direction by N.M.J. Wasailao, background vocals by Champa Kalhari, with N. M. Jay Wasailao. Production management was done by Roland de Silva and dialogue recording done by Anuruddha Basnayake.

== Screening ==
Using the internet as a platform, the film is being brought to the audience while many filmmakers' films are standing in queues complaining about not being able to be screened in cinemas. The film was released online from 12 August 2022. According to the director, apart from the platform exhibition, the film will not be screen in a cinema in Sri Lanka. But he said that there are plans to screen the film in several cinema halls in Australia.
