= Me Wage Adarayak =

- Sinhala: මේ වගේ ආදරයක්
- Directed by: Chandran Rutnam
- Written by: Chandran Rutnam
- Produced by: Taprobane Films
- Starring: Dinakshie Priyasad; Anuj Ranasinghe; Heshan Don
- Cinematography: Amith Suranga
- Edited by: Chandran Rathnam; Ajith Ramanayake
- Music by: Chitral Somapala
- Release date: 24 June 2015
- Country: Sri Lanka
- Language: Sinhala

Me Wage Adarayak (A Love Like This) (මේ වගේ ආදරයක්) is a 2015 Sri Lankan Sinhala romantic film directed and produced by Chandran Rutnam for Taprobane Films. It stars Dinakshie Priyasad and Anuj Ranasinghe in lead roles along with Heshan Don and Kuma Aththanayake. Music composed by Chitral Somapala. The movie has elements that closely mirror the Hollywood movie Love Story(1970) which is in turn based on the book by Erich Segal of the same name. It is the 1231st Sri Lankan film in the Sinhala cinema.

== Plot ==
25 year-old Roshan is an instructor in a leading aviation company. He comes from a high class family and his father is an influential politician. Roshan falls in love with Serina who is an engineering student in the same company. They face many obstacles because of Roshan's father. Roshan decides to disregard everything and venture into a new life with Serina. Fate intervenes in the life of these two lovers.

== Cast ==
- Anuj Ranasinghe as Roshan
- Dinakshie Priyasad as Serina
- Heshan Don
- Kuma Aththanayake as Serina's father
- Nalaka Vishwamith
- Wilman Sirimanne as Roshan's father
- Nalaka Daluwatta
- Richard Weerakkody
- Miyasi Sandeepani as Serina's friend

== Soundtrack ==
No.	Title	Lyrics	Singer(s)	Length
1.	"Wasanthaye Mal Pipila"	Chandralal Fonseka	Chithral Somapala
2.	"Adare"	Kasun Viduranga	Suresh Aruna
3.	"Oba Enne Kawadada"	Heshan Premashila	Heshan Premashila
