= Isuru Lokuhettiarachchi =

Sri Lankan actor (born 1983)

Isuru Lokuhettiarachchi ඉසුරු ලොකුහෙට්ටිආරච්චි
- Born: 23 March 1983 (age 43); Matara, Sri Lanka
- Education: Rahula College
- Occupations: Actor, Singer, TV Host, Dubbing Artist, Voice Actor
- Years active: 2008–present
- Spouse: Single

Isuru Lokuhettiarachchi (born 23 March 1983; Sinhala: ඉසුරු ලොකුහෙට්ටිආරච්චි), is an actor in Sri Lankan cinema and television.

== Personal life ==
He was born on 23 March 1983 in Matara, Sri Lanka as the youngest child of the family. He completed education from Rahula College, Matara. He has one elder brother.

Before entering drama, he worked in Sri Lanka Army. He worked as a second lieutenant in Army from 2003 to 2007. His first working station was Ariyalei in Jaffna during Eelam War. Then he worked at Naagadeepa, Kilali, Sarasale, Eluthumadduval and Muhamalai army bases. After quit from army, he worked as a manager in the pharmaceutical marketing industry. In 2013, he completed the degree on Drama and Theater from University of Drama.

== Career ==
After quit from army, he acted in few teledramas and stage dramas in uncredited roles. His maiden television acting came through Dennata Denna directed by Charith Kothalawala in 2008. But in that drama, only his back side was visible. He acted as a reality show watcher and was wearing a t-shirt with a number on it. That's the number he was able to recognize as his back. In 2012, he acted in first supportive role in the popular drama Malee as "Piyarathna" .

He is also a popular dubbing artist, that rendered his voice for many dubbed television serials, including Boys Over Flowers, Pruthuvi Maharaja, Adjiraja Dharmashoka, Ananthayen Aaa Tharu Kumara, Blacklist and Me Adarayay.

His maiden cinema acting came through 2017 film Ran Sayura with a villain role. His most notable films include Nidahase Piya DS, Husma and President Super Star. His role as "Ruwan" in Husma was highly praised by critics. In 2020 his role 'Narada' became very popular due to his Southern Sinhala accent in the serial Sanda Hangila.

He hosted the television musical program 7 notes and Siyatha Voice Of Asia telecast by Siyatha TV. In 2020 he appeared in dual roles in the television serial Hoda Wade.

=== Selected television serials ===
- Angana as Sampath
- Colomba Api Awa
- Dhawala Hasthiya
- Dedunnai Adare as Danushka
- Diyaniyo as Shelton
- Eka Rene Kurullo
- Iru Deva
- Konkala Doni as Amantha
- Malee 1, 2 as Piyarathna
- No Parking as Sanjeewa
- Oba Nisa as Thenuka
- Pehesara as Dilmin
- Pini as Sampatha
- Pork Veediya as Wangeesa
- Ravana Season 1, 2 as King Kuwera
- Roda Thune Manamali as Senaka
- Salmal Aramaya as Satharasinghe
- See Raja as Budal
- Sooriya Wachchasa
- Sudu Kaputo
- Visi Eka

== Filmography ==
Key
†	Denotes films that have not yet been released

Year	Film	Roles	Ref.
2017	Ran Sayura	Punchi Baby	
2018	Nidahase Piya DS	Young F.R. Senanayake	
2019	Nathi Bari Tarzan	Isuru	
2019	Husma	Ruwan	
2019	Rush	CID Radeesh Imbulgoda	
2019	President Super Star	Asela Ranaweera	
2021	Ginimal Pokuru	Ranga	
2021	Kawuruth Danne Na	Hitman	
2022	Happy Birthday	Victor	
2022	CineMa		
2024	Ridee Seenu	Bandara	
2024	Mandara	Police OIC	
2024	Gini Avi Saha Gini Keli 2	Bogahawatte Lucky	
2025	Soorya	Police officer	
TBA	Kidnap †		
TBA	Amuthu Gurukamak †		
TBA	Abheetha †		
