= Udugan Yamaya =

Udugan Yamaya උඩුගං යාමය
- Directed by: Sudath Devapriya
- Written by: Sudath Devapriya
- Produced by: NFC
- Starring: Mauli Ferdinando; Chandani Seneviratne; Suminda Sirisena
- Cinematography: M. D. Mahindapala
- Edited by: Ravindra Guruge
- Music by: Sarath Fernando
- Production company: Cinemaya Productions
- Release date: 1 June 2006
- Country: Sri Lanka
- Language: Sinhala

Udugan Yamaya (Against the Tide) (Sinhala: උඩුගං යාමය) is a 2006 Sri Lankan Sinhala drama film directed by Sudath Devapriya and produced by National Film Corporation. It stars child actor Mauli Ferdinando with Chandani Seneviratne in lead roles along with Suminda Sirisena and Rex Kodippili. Music composed by Sarath Fernando. The film was screened at The Times London Film Festival on 24 and 28 October 2006. It is the 1072nd Sri Lankan film in the Sinhala cinema.

The film has been shot around Kathaluwa and Koggala areas. In 2004, the film was selected as the official Sri Lankan representation at the 38th Indian International Film festival in New Delhi.

== Plot ==
Film is based on the experiences of a child caught up in the terror engulfed the country during the time of the second JVP uprising.

== Cast ==
- Mauli Ferdinando as Sirimal
- Chandani Seneviratne as Sirimal's mother
- Richard Weerakody
- Thisuri Yuwanika as Dingiri
- Giriraj Kaushalya
- Suminda Sirisena as Sirimal's father
- Duleeka Marapana
- Saumya Liyanage
- Rex Kodippili
- Anura Wijesinghe
- Susantha Chandramali

== Awards ==
- Sarasavi Film Festival/President Film Festival 2006 -Best Director/Best script writer/Best Film -sudath Devapriya
- SIGNIS- Film Festival 2006

Best Film/Best Director -Sudath Devapriya

- Sarasaviya Award for the best Actress in 2006 - Chandani Seneviratne
- SIGNIS Gold award for Creative Acting (Female) - Chandani Seneviratne
