= Onna Babo =

2002 Sri Lankan Sinhala children's film by Dinesh Priyasad

- DVD poster
- ඔන්න බබෝ
- Directed by: Dinesh Priyasad
- Written by: Somapala Leelananda
- Based on: Baby's Day Out by John Hughes
- Produced by: Lalindra Films
- Starring: Sangeetha Weeraratne; Shanudrie Priyasad; Wimal Kumara de Costa
- Cinematography: Nimalsiri Rosa
- Edited by: Dinesh Priyasad
- Music by: Somapala Rathnayake
- Production company: Dil Process Lab
- Release date: 3 September 2002
- Country: Sri Lanka
- Language: Sinhala

Onna Babo (Sinhala: ඔන්න බබෝ) is a 2002 Sri Lankan Sinhala children's film directed by Dinesh Priyasad and produced by Lalindra Wijewickrama for Lalindra Films. It stars Sangeetha Weeraratne and child actress Shanudrie Priyasad in lead roles along with Wimal Kumara de Costa and Ronnie Leach. Music composed by Somapala Rathnayake. It is the 989th Sri Lankan film in the Sinhala cinema. The film was influenced by the 1994 Hollywood film Baby's Day Out.

== Cast ==
- Sangeetha Weeraratne
- Shanudrie Priyasad as Shanu
- Wimal Kumara de Costa
- Ronnie Leitch
- Don Guy
- Janaki Wijerathne
- Shan Senanayake
- Mohan Hettiarachchi
- Tyrone Michael
- Teddy Vidyalankara
- Mervyn Silva
- Peter Perera
- Sampath de Seram
- George Manathunga
