= Wes (TV series) =

Sri Lankan Romantic Thriller TV Series

- ෴වෙස්෴
- Genre: Romantic Thriller; Thriller
- Written by: Kaushalya Pathirana
- Directed by: Danushka Rathnayaka
- Starring: Saranga Disasekara; Dinakshie Priyasad
- Theme music composer: Udara Samaraweera
- Opening theme: "වෙස් පෙරලීමට නියමිතයි."
- Country of origin: Sri Lanka
- Original language: Sinhala
- No. of seasons: 2
- No. of episodes: 138

Production
- Running time: 29 minutes

Original release
- Network: Swarnavahini
- Release: 7 August 2018 – 14 February 2019

Wes (Sinhala: වෙස්) is a 2018 Sri Lankan teledrama broadcast on Swarnawahini. The series is directed by Danushka Rathnayaka and produced by Janaka Sampath Thambaravila, with a script written by Kaushalya Pathirana. It stars Saranga Disasekara, Dinakshie Priyasad, Chameera Liyanage, Harsha Thennakoon, and Wasantha Wittachchi, Yash Weerasinghe, Vinu Udani Siriwardhana in lead roles. The music for the series is composed by Udara Samaraweera, and the theme song is performed by Mihindu Ariyaratne. The drama aired with the tagline "වෙස් පෙරලීමට නියමිතයි."

== Summary ==
Devinda Dissanayake, an innocent young man looking to go overseas for a career, is made a scapegoat for a collective crime committed by his group of friends. A new persona emerges, called Ryan De Silva, much prosperous and enigmatic and bears a striking resemblance to late Devinda, throwing his former group of "friends" to a sudden panic.)

== Cast ==
=== Main ===
- Saranga Disasekara as Devinda / Ryan
- Dinakshie Priyasad as Sanjana
- Chameera Liyanage as Ramesh
- Harsha Thennakoon as Ajith
- Wasantha Wittachchi as Loku Ayiya
- Danushka Rathnayaka as Prince
- Piumi Srinayaka as Ryan's Secretary
- Yash Weerasinghe as Madhawa

=== Supporting ===
- Dinelka Muthuarachchi
- Grace Thennakoon as Devinda's mother
- Daya Thennakoon as Devinda's father
- Nayomi Thakshila
- Vinu Udani Siriwardhana
- Anuradha Edirisinghe
- Wilson Karu
