= Nidahase Piya DS =

- Directed by: Suneth Malinga Lokuhewa
- Written by: Nishantha Weerasingha
- Produced by: Wijeyadasa Rajapakshe; Dilman Jayaratne; Channa Hettiarachchi; Rajaputhra Weerasinghe; Kithsiri Athulathmudali; Clarance Kumarage
- Starring: Lakshman Mendis; Thumindu Dodantenna; Saranga Disasekara
- Cinematography: Chandana Jayasinghe
- Edited by: Shan Alwis
- Music by: Samantha Perera
- Production company: SepteMber Studio's
- Distributed by: Ridma circuit
- Release date: 13 October 2018
- Country: Sri Lanka
- Language: Sinhala
- Budget: 100crore

Nidahase Piya DS (Father of Independence) is a 2018 Sri Lankan Sinhala biographical film directed by Suneth Malinga Lokuhewa and co-produced by Wijeyadasa Rajapakshe, Dilman Jayaratne, Channa Hettiarachchi, Rajaputhra Weerasinghe, Kithsiri Athulathmudali and Clarance Kumarage. It stars an ensemble cast of many popular actors, with Lakshman Mendis in the lead role, with Thumindu Dodantenna and Saranga Disasekara in supportive roles. Music composed by Samantha Perera. It is the 1313th Sri Lankan film in the Sinhala cinema.

The film revolves around the life of Sri Lanka's first prime minister, D.S. Senanayake, who is known as the "Father of the Nation". The film trailer and the theme song were released on 4 February 2018, the 70th anniversary of the country's independence. A private screening of the film was held for the family relatives of D.S. Senanayake, which was organised by the director.

Prior to screening in Sri Lanka, the film has scheduled to screen in several other countries such as Australia, New Zealand and Canada with the participation of Sri Lankans living there.

The film was shot in Ranminitenna cinema village, Meerigama and places around Kandy, Peradeniya and Bogambara prison.

== Plot ==
It depicts the life of Rt. Hon. D.S. Senanayake, known as the "Father of the Nation" and his dedication to build an independent Ceylon.

== Cast ==
The film comprises an ensemble cast with many popular and award-winning artists of all generations.

- Lakshman Mendis as D.S. Senanayake
  - Thumindu Dodantenna as young D.S. Senanayake
- Saranga Disasekara as S. W. R. D. Bandaranaike
- Richard Manamudali as Oliver Goonetilleke
- Kamal Deshapriya as Dudley Senanayake
- Somasiri Alakolange as Ponnambalam Ramanathan
- Udith Abeyrathna as J. R. Jayewardene
- Palitha Silva as F. R. Senanayake
  - Isuru Lokuhettiarachchi as young F. R. Senanayake
- G.R Perera as Don Spater Senanayake, Father of D. S. Senanayake
- Janak Premalal as E. W. Perera
- Sajeewa Rajaputhra as John Kotelawala
- Buddhadasa Vithanarachchi as D. B. Jayatilaka
- Nayana Hettiarachchi as Dona Catherina Elizabeth Perera, Mother of D. S. Senanayake
- Susantha Chandramali as Molly Dunuwila, wife of D. S. Senanayake
  - Thisuri Yuwanika as Young Molly Dunuwila
- Eranga Jeewantha as D. R. Wijewardena
- Sanjeewa Dissanayaka as C. W. W. Kannangara
- Roshan Pilapitiya as D. C. Senanayake
- Nirosha Thalagala as Grace Dunuwila
- Jayalal Rohana as James Peiris
- Athula Jayasinghe as A. E. Goonesinghe
- Pujitha de Mel as Henry Pedris
- Chandika Nanayakkara as D.C.P. De Silva
- Kriz Chris Henri Harriz as Chief clerk
- Douglas Ranasinghe as Richard Aluwihare
- Milinda Perera as G.G. Ponnambalam
- Sriyantha Mendis as Wrestling coach
- Gamini Hettiarachchi as Wrestling commentator
- Anura Bandara Rajaguru as Salesman
- Wasantha Wittachchi as Chief monk
- Akasha Pathirana as Arthur V. Dias
- Dilip Manohara as Piyadasa Sirisena
- Udeni Alwis as Ponnambalam Arunachalam
- Sarath Chandrasiri as Driver Karolis
- Hemasiri Liyanage as D. D. Pedris
- Sriyani Mahawatte as Mallino Pedris
- Nayomi Thakshila as Hilda Pedris
- Thesara Jayawardane as Dr. Perera
- Kumara Thirimadura as School principal
- Dayadeva Edirisinghe as Servant in Orchid house
- Sandun Wijesiri as Indian doctor
- Pavithra Wickramasinghe as Ellen Atigala
- Ayodya Rathnasiri as Mary Senanayake
- Ranjan Prasanna as Reporter
- Sasthriya Rajaputhra as Atigala
- Nanda Wickramage as Ven. Sri Subhuthi Thero
- Richard Mundy as Judge
- Michael Schram as Bonar Law

== Songs ==
No.	Title	Lyrics	Singer(s)	Length
1.	"Nidahase Piya"	Sunil Ariyaratne	Amarasiri Peiris, Samantha Perera
