= Kavindu Madushan =

Sri Lankan dancer and actor

Kavindu Madushan කවිඳු මධුෂාන්
- Born: P. G. Kavindu Madushan; 1 August 1997 (age 29); Piliyandala, Sri Lanka
- Education: Piliyandala Central College
- Occupations: Choreographer, Dancer, actor
- Years active: 2009–present

P. G. Kavindu Madushan (born on 1 August 1997 as කවිඳු මධුෂාන්) [Sinhala]), is a model, dancer, choreographer and television actor.

== Personal life ==
Madushan was born on 1 August 1997 in Piliyandala, Sri Lanka as the eldest of the family. His father is P. G. Jayarathne and his mother Shanthi Perera is a housewife. He completed education from Piliyandala Central College. He has one younger sister, Chiranya Chandupani.

== Career ==
Madhushan was drawn to dance from an early age particularly with his family background. He studied new dance styles from many dance teachers from the early age. In 2008, he applied for the second season of Derana Little Star reality program. There he became the first runner-up in the competition and made his landmark of the career. In 2014, he joined with the dance group of Gayan Srimal through Sirasa Dancing Star.

Then in 2016, in the eighth season, there was a competition of the winners of the previous Little Star winners titled "Derana Dance Unlimited", where he won its title accompany with Anjani Shalanika. Then in 2019, he joined another reality program, the Hiru Super Dancer program and became the runner-up. During this program, he was invited to play a role in a television serial. With that, he made television acting debut in 2020 through the mega teledrama Sihina Genena Kumariye where he played the role of disabled child "Sadev". In the meantime, he excelled his dancing credentials from Gayan Srimal. In 2021, Madushan joined with Shanudrie Priyasad for third season of Hiru Mega Star. During the competition, the duo made several notable dance choreography and finally ended the competition as the first runner-up. In 2026, Madushan won the award for the Best Choreographer at the 37th Sarasaviya Awards for the film ''Moda Tharindu''.

== Awards ==
- 2009 Derana Little Star – first runner up
- 2017 Derana Dance Unlimited – winner with Anjani Shalanika
- 2019 Hiru Super Dancer – first runner up with Agasi Dewani
- 2021 Hiru Mega Star – first runner up with Shanudrie Priyasad
- 2025 Derana Music Video Awards – Best Choreographer
- 2026 Sarasaviya Awards – Best Choreographer
