= Irasma =

Irasma ඉරැස්මා
- DVD poster
- Directed by: Ariyaratne Vithana
- Written by: Ariyaratne Vithana
- Based on: Anoma Ratnayake's Novel Irasma
- Produced by: NFC Films
- Starring: Ama Wijesekara; Douglas Ranasinghe; Iranganie Serasinghe
- Cinematography: Suminda Weerasinghe
- Edited by: Denzil Jayaweera
- Music by: Victor Ratnayake
- Distributed by: Film Corporation circuit
- Release date: 20 June 2003
- Country: Sri Lanka
- Language: Sinhala

Irasma (Sinhala: ඉරැස්මා) is a 2003 Sri Lankan Sinhala children's film directed by Ariyaratne Vithana. It stars Ama Wijesekera in lead role along with Douglas Ranasinghe and Iranganie Serasinghe. Music composed by Victor Ratnayake. This is the first children's film funded by Film Development Fund of the National Film Corporation as well. The film also screened at many film festivals.

The film has received mainly positive reviews by critics. It is the 1012nd Sri Lankan film in the Sinhala cinema.

== Cast ==
- Ama Wijesekera as Irasma Wijesundera aka Ima
  - Hirushini Abeygunawardana as little Ima
- Douglas Ranasinghe as Sonali's husband
- Iranganie Serasinghe as Ima's granny
- Maureen Charuni as Sonali, Ima's aunty
- Duleeka Marapana as Paali, Ima's mother
- Priyankara Rathnayake as Tharintha Wijesundera, Ima's father
- Romesh Sugathapala as Mahil
- Saranga Disasekara as Ima's eldest cousin

== Award ==
- Merit Award at Prix Leonardo Film Festival, Italy
