= Bahuchithawadiya =

- Theatrical release poster
- Directed by: Malaka Dewapriya
- Written by: Malaka Dewapriya
- Produced by: Malaka Dewapriya
- Starring: Kalana Gunasekara; Veena Jayakody; Lakshman Mendis; Samanalee Fonseka; Damitha Abeyratne
- Cinematography: Chinthaka Somakeerthi
- Edited by: Harsha Disanayaka
- Music by: Chitral Somapala
- Distributed by: Alumni Organization University of Colombo
- Release dates: April 2018 (Moscow); 30 May 2025 (Sri Lanka)
- Running time: 90 minutes
- Country: Sri Lanka
- Language: Sinhala

Bahuchithawadiya (The Undecided) (Sinhala: බහුචිතවාදියා) is a 2018 Sri Lankan Sinhala drama romance film directed and produced by Malaka Dewapriya. It stars Kalana Gunasekara and Veena Jayakody in lead roles along with Lakshman Mendis, Samanalee Fonseka and Damitha Abeyratne. Music composed by Chitral Somapala. This film is presented By Alumni Organization University of Colombo. The film successfully passed 75 days of screening.

The film received mainly positive reviews especially the cast, dialogues and scenery.

== Etymology ==
in Sinhala language ‘Bahu’ means multiple and ‘Chitha’ means thoughts. ‘Bahuchithawadiya’ simply means ‘one in many minds’ or ‘one who lacks single-mindedness’. In other words ‘an undecided mind’ The term ‘Bahuchithawadiya’ was coined to denote the nature of our youth in contemporary society in Sri Lanka.

== Plot ==
Sasitha works as the underpaid delivery man for Giftnet, an Internet-based business which accepts gift orders from outside Sri Lanka. Suffocated by economic pressures and sexual frustrations, like most of his peers he sees going abroad as the only way out of his wretched existence. Fascinated with the idea of "abroad" he forms relationships with the recipients of these gifts, most of whom are rich, lonely women. When the real world starts to look too bleak, Sasitha seeks greener pastures through virtual relationships he builds on Facebook and Skype with Sri Lankan women of his own class, working abroad. But when nothing seems to go right, he grows desperate

== Cast ==
- Kalana Gunasekara as Sasitha
- Veena Jayakody as Iranganie
- Lakshman Mendis as Boss
- Samanalee Fonseka as Kumari
- Nilmini Buwaneka as Sasitha's Sister
- Damitha Abeyratne as Kanthi
- Sulochana Vithanarachchi as Nirmala
- Geetha Alahakoon as Sasitha's Girl friend Kanchana
- Rajitha Hewathanthrige as Sasitha's friend
- D.B. Gangodathenna as Old man
- Prasadini Athapattu as Wife of Sasitha's friend
- Omali Radhika as Cyber friend Samadhi

== International and local recognition ==
=== Accolades ===
It is the debut feature film by Dewapriya and film has awarded in many film festivals. The film received many positive reviews from critics.

Award	Date of ceremony	Category	Recipients and nominees	Result	Ref(s)
5th Derana Film Awards in Sri Lanka	2018	Best Film Cinema Of Tomorrow	Malaka Dewapriya	Won	
Independents Film Festival in Karlsruhe	2018	Best Independent Film	Malaka Dewapriya	Won	
34th Sarasaviya Awards in Sri Lanka	2018	Most Promising Director of Lester James Peris Special jury award	Malaka Dewapriya	Won	
8th SAARC Film Festival	2018	Best Direction Special jury award	Malaka Dewapriya	Won	
8th SAARC Film Festival	2018	Best Sound Design	Sasika ruwan Marasinghe	Won	
40th Moscow International Film Festival	2018	NETPAC	In Compettiotion	Nominated	
37th Sarasaviya Awards in Sri Lanka	2026	Best film	Malaka Dewapriya	Won	
37th Sarasaviya Awards in Sri Lanka	2026	Best Script	Malaka Dewapriya	Won	
37th Sarasaviya Awards in Sri Lanka	2026	Best Promising Actor	Kalana Gunasekara	Won	
37th Sarasaviya Awards in Sri Lanka	2026	Best Direction	Malaka Dewapriya	Nominated	
37th Sarasaviya Awards in Sri Lanka	2026	Best Editing	Harsha Disanayaka	Nominated	
37th Sarasaviya Awards in Sri Lanka	2026	Best Cinematography	Chinthaka Somakeerthi	Nominated	
67th State Literary Awards in Sri Lanka	2026	Best Screen Play Script	Malaka Dewapriya	Won	

- Screened at Cinema of tomorrow 2018– 5thDerana Film Awards
- Screened at 40th Moscow International Film Festival 2018
- Screened at Independents Film Festival in Karlsruhe, Germany 2018
- Screened at 34th Sarasaviya Awards
- Screened at – 8th SAARC Film Festival 2018
- Screened at 26th Loveisfolly International Film festival in Bulgaria 2018
- Scheduled to Screened at International Cinema Festival in Jaffna 2018
- Screened at Kazan International Festival 2018
