= Thisuri Yuwanika =

Sri Lankan actress

- තිසුරි යුවනිකා
- Born: Thisuri Yuwanika Madduma Liyanage; 6 March 1991; Nugegoda, Sri Lanka
- Education: Anula Vidyalaya, Nugegoda
- Occupation: Actress
- Years active: 1994–present
- Spouse: Suraj Wijesinghe (m.2018)
- Parents: Kumaru Liyanage (father); Susantha Chandramali (mother)
- Awards: Best Upcoming Actress (2013); Best Actress (2014); Best Actress (2015)

Thisuri Yuwanika (Sinhala: තිසුරි යුවනිකා මද්දුම ලියනගේ; born Thisuri Yuwanika Madduma Liyanage; 6 March 1991) is a Sri Lankan actress in Sri Lankan cinema, theater and television. Debuting as a child actress in 1994, Yuwanika has been awarded Best Upcoming Teledrama Actress and Best Actress multiple times in several award festivals.

== Early life and education ==
Yuwanika is the only child of Susantha Chandramali and Kumaru Liyanage. Her mother, Susantha Chandramali, was a well renowned actress in Sri Lanka with an extensive acting career of over 25 years.

Yuwanika attended Anula Vidyalaya in Nugegoda up until her Advanced Level (A/L) examinations, in which Yuwanika majored in arts stream subjects (French, Sinhalese and Logic). She then started following a Business Studies degree which she has currently put on hold to focus on her acting career. She is married to longtime partner Suraj Wijesinghe, a marine engineer.

== Acting career ==
Thisuri made her acting debut with her mother in Punchi Kumarige Naththala (1994) when she was just 3 years old. She then had the chance to act in Sudath Devapriya's Udu Gang Yamaya (2001).

After graduating from school, she began to actively take part in dramas. In 2013, she was awarded Best Upcoming Actress for Avasarai Piyabanna. She then acted in Rukmal Nirosh's Sulanga Matha Mohothak, which helped her disclose her acting skills to a wider audience. She acted as the character of 'Charulatha' in the drama and was awarded the Best Actress award in the 2015 Sumathi Awards for her performance when she was just 24 years old.

=== Awards ===
- Best Upcoming Actress in the 2013 Sumathi Awards
- Best Actress in the 2014 National Awards
- Best Actress in the 2015 Sumathi Awards
- Best Actress in the 2019 Sumathi Awards

=== Selected television series ===
- Adare Suwada Aran
- Anantha
- Diyaniyo
- Ganga Addara Kele
- Husma Wetena Mal
- Induwari
- Meda Gedara
- Mini Gan Dela
- Modara Bambaru
- Muthu Palasa
- Nirasha
- Oba Nisa
- Pera Maduwa
- Ran Damwel
- Sanda Sanda Wage
- Siyapath Arama
- Sulanga Matha Mohothak
- Thaththe Api Awa
- Thurya
- Walakulu Dorin Galanna

== Filmography ==
Key
†	Denotes films that have not yet been released

Year	Film	Role	Ref.
2004	Udugan Yamaya	Dingiri	
2008	Machan	Manoj's younger sister	
2012	Daruwane	Dulani	
2016	Spandana	Achini	
2017	Dharmayuddhaya	Achini	
2018	Nidahase Piya DS	Young Molly Dunuwila	
2024	Sihinayaki Adare	Jennifer's friend	
2026	Dharmayuddhaya 2	Achini	
