= Sheshadri Priyasad =

Sri Lankan actress and presenter

Sheshadrie Priyasad
- ශේෂාද්‍රි ප්‍රියසාද්
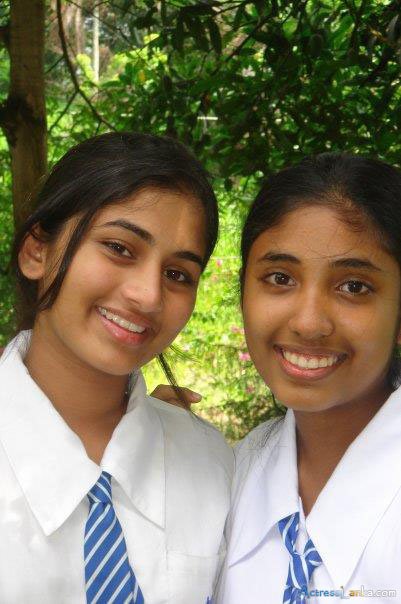
- Born: Baminnahennadige Sheshadrie Priyasad; December 2, 1991 (age 34); Colombo, Sri Lanka
- Education: Holy Family Convent, Bambalapitiya
- Occupations: Actress; TV Presenter
- Years active: 1997–Present
- Spouses: Sampath De Silva (m. 2013; div. 2015); Krishan Perera (m. 2021)
- Children: Krisharya Perera
- Parent(s): Dinesh Priyasad (father); Shiranie Priyasad (mother)
- Relatives: Dinakshie Priyasad (sister); Shanudrie Priyasad (sister); Saranga Disasekara (brother-in-law); Dinesh Gamage(brother-in-law)

Baminnahennadige Sheshadrie Priyasad (Sinhalese: ශේෂාද්‍රි ප්‍රියසාද්; born 2 December 1991), is an actress in Sri Lankan cinema and a television presenter.

== Personal life ==
Sheshadrie Priyasad was born on 2 December 1991 as the second of the family with three siblings. Her father Dinesh Priyasad is a filmmaker and producer in Sinhala cinema and mother Shirani Priyasad is a housewife. Her elder sister Dinakshie Priyasad is also a popular award-winning actress in Sri Lankan cinema, television and stage drama and a television host. Her younger sister Shanudrie Priyasad is also a popular award-winning actress in cinema, television as well as a singer. She is a past pupil of Holy Family Convent, Bambalapitiya.

== Career ==
Her first cinematic appearance was as a four-year-old child artist in a 1997 film, Apaye Thathpara Asu Haradahak, directed by her father Dinesh Priyasad. She also worked as a child television host in the children's program Punchi Panchi with her sister Dinakshie, telecasted by Sirasa TV. Sheshadri's first adult lead role was in the 2011 film Challengers (Yawwanaye Babaru Api).

== Filmography ==
=== Film ===
Key
†	Denotes films that have not yet been released

Year	Film	Role	Ref.
1997	Apaye Thathpara Asu Haradahak		
2011	Challenges	Sharanya	
2012	Senasuru Maruwa	Anuththara	
2013	Double Trouble		
2015	Address Na	Subha	
2016	Zoom	Shanuli	
2024	Weerya	Thilini Jayawardena	
2024	Sihinayaki Adare	Divya	
2026	Eda Raa	Priyani Dharmadasa	
2026	Agnijaya		
2026	Rahai Jeewithe		
TBA	Adda Lanuwa Damma Kodiya †		
TBA	Tharu Athara †	Subhani	
TBA	Honeymoon Tomorrow †		
TBA	Colombo 13 †		

== Awards ==
She won a merit award at 34th Sarasaviya Awards in 2016 for the role Shanuli in 2015 film Zoom.

Bunka Cultural Awards

Year	Nominee / work	Award	Result
2016	Zoom	Merit Award	Won
2016	Address Na	Best Upcoming Actress	Nominated
