= Gamane Yaa =

Sri Lankan teledrama

- Gamane Yaa title card
- ගමනේ යා
- Genre: Thriller
- Created by: Senaka Edirisighe
- Written by: Lal Wasantha
- Starring: Palitha Silva; Dharmapriya Dias; Shanudrie Priyasad; Sarath Kothalawala; Umayangana Wickramasinghe; Ramya Wanigasekara
- Voices of: Indika Ruwan; Tharaka Sandaruwan
- Opening theme: Eiffel Kulunata Udin Gihilla
- Composer: Tharaka Sandaruwan
- Country of origin: Sri Lanka
- Original language: Sinhala
- No. of seasons: 1
- No. of episodes: 43

Production
- Producer: Chandana Krishantha
- Production location: Minneriya
- Running time: 20 to 22 minutes

Original release
- Network: Rupavahini
- Release: January 16, 2021

Gamane Yaa (Sinhala: ගමනේ යා) is a 2021 Sri Lankan thriller teledrama broadcast by Sri Lanka Rupavahini, directed by Senaka Edirisighe, produced by Chandana Krishantha, and music composed by Tharaka Sandaruwan. It was released on 16, January 2021 and continues every weekend at 8:00 pm to 8:30 pm. Minneriya Army Infantry Training Center has been taken for the shootings. The teledrama indicates the lives style of army soldiers.

The serial stars Shanudrie Priyasad, Umayangana Wickramasinghe, Ramya Wanigasekara, Sarath Kothalawala, Dharmapriya Dias, and Palitha Silva.

== Cast ==
=== Main ===
- Shanudrie Priyasad
- Palitha Silva
- Dharmapriya Dias
- Sarath Kothalawala
- Umayangana Wickramasinghe
- Ramya Wanigasekara

=== Supportive ===
- Madanee Malwaththage
- Susantha Chandramali
- Jehan Appuhami
- Dilini Lakmali
- Gamini Jayalath
- Suneth Priya
- Tharindi Fernando
- Asela Chathuranga
- Kusum Maldeniya
- Madeera Ushani
- Supun Senevirathne
- Thilan Warnajith Wijesingha
- Nadun Akalanka
- Amal Wickramasinghe
