= Mollie Dunuwila Senanayake =

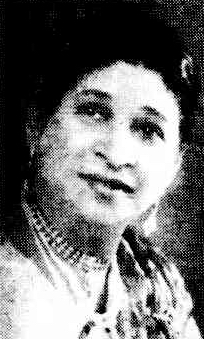
- Mollie Senanayake, from a 1950 publication.
- Born: Mollie Dunuwila
- Spouse: D. S. Senanayake
- Children: Dudley Shelton Senanayake

Mollie Dunuwila Senanayake (née Dunuwila), was a Sri Lankan public figure, she was the wife of Don Stephen Senanyake, who became Prime Minister of newly independent dominion in 1948. Her son Dudley was the second Prime Minister of Ceylon, in 1952.

== Early life ==
Mollie (or Molly) Dunuwila (or Dunuwille) was the daughter of R. R. Dunuwila and Grace Jayatilaka. Her father was in local government, serving as police magistrate and later as Secretary of the Colombo Municipal Council. Her maternal grandfather, Frederick Jayatilaka, was an officer in the Ceylon Civil Service and had served as the District Judge of Kalutara.

== Marriage ==
Dunuwila married D. S. Senanayake in 1910. They had two sons, Dudley Senanayake (1911-1973) and Robert Parakrama Senanayake (1913-1986). She was widowed when D. S. Senanayake died in 1952, in a riding accident.

Mollie Senanayake became the wife of the premier of Ceylon, when the country became an independent dominion of the British Commonwealth in 1948. She hosted a dinner at the official residence, the Temple Trees, as part of the independence celebration. In her message to the United National Party, she wrote, "Let us devote ourselves wholeheartedly to the service of our motherland in the useful sphere of our homes, and build up a nation physically, intellectually, and morally second to no other nation in the world."

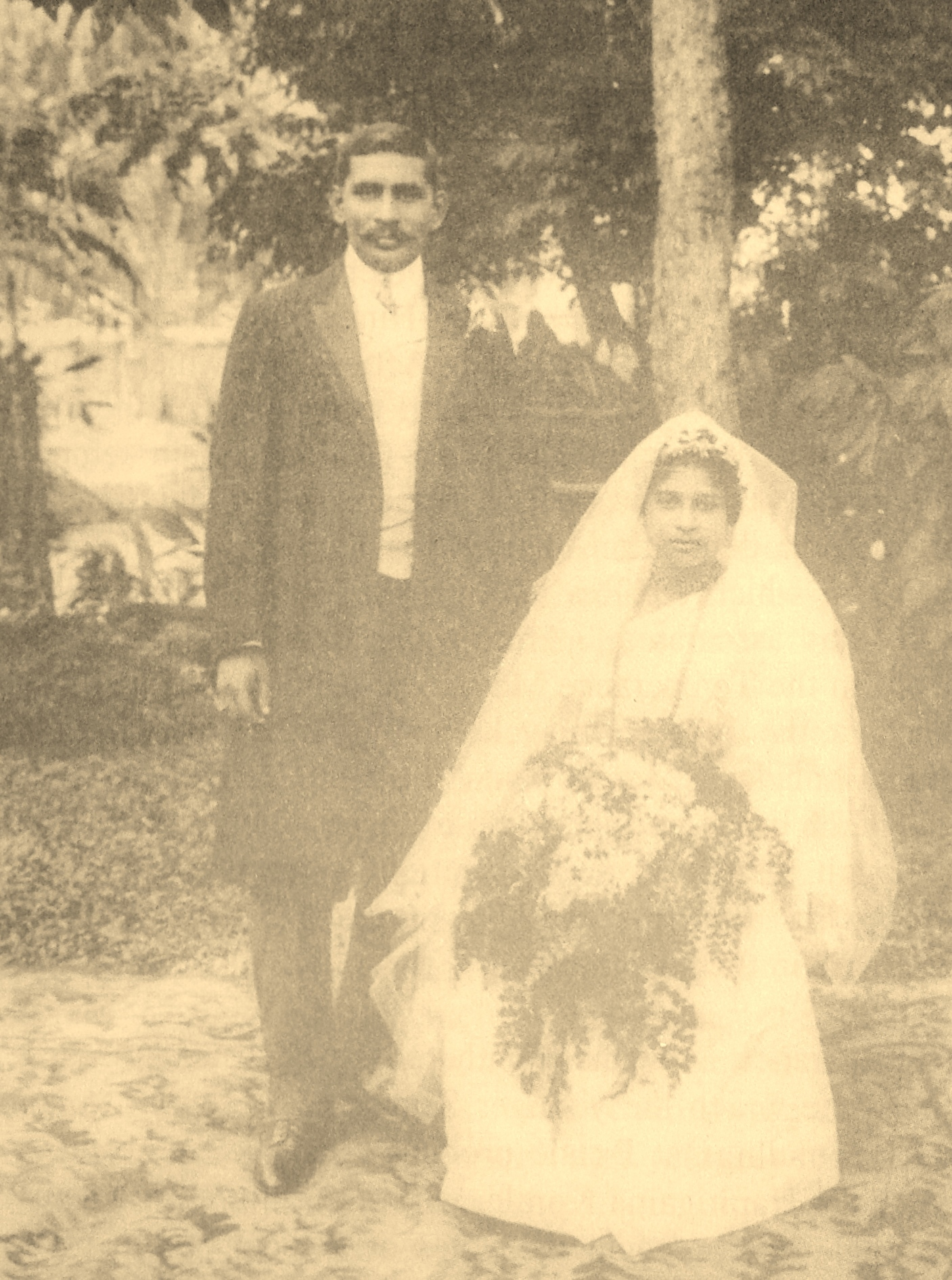
Wedding of D. S. Senanayake and Mollie Dunuwila in 1910

Her elder son succeeded her husband as Prime Minister. Rukman Senanayake, a current Sri Lankan politician, is one of her grandchildren. Wasantha Senanayake, also a current Sri Lankan politician, is one of her great-grandchildren.

In the Sinhala film Nidahase Piya DS (2018), a biographical film about D. S. Senanayake, the character of Molly Dunuwila was played by actresses Thisuri Yuwanika (as a young woman) and her mother Susantha Chandramali (as an older woman).
