= Wada Bari Tarzan Mathisabayata =

2008 Sri Lankan comedy film

Wada Bari Tarzan Mathisabayata වැඩබැරි ටාසන් මැතිසබයට
- Directed by: Sudesh Wasantha Peiris; Sunil Soma Peiris
- Written by: Sunil Soma Peiris; Chandradasa Fernando
- Produced by: Sunil T. Films
- Starring: Tennyson Cooray; Piyumi Purasinghe
- Cinematography: Lalith M. Thomas
- Edited by: Pravin Jayaratne
- Music by: Keshan Perera
- Release date: 28 April 2008
- Country: Sri Lanka
- Language: Sinhala

Wada Bari Tarzan Mathisabayata (Sinhala: වැඩබැරි ටාසන් මැතිසබයට), also as Wada Bari Tarzan 2, is a 2008 Sri Lankan Sinhala comedy film co-directed by Sudesh Wasantha Peiris and Sunil Soma Peiris and produced by Sunil T. Fernando for Sunil T. Films. The film is the sequel to blockbuster 2007 movie Weda Beri Tarzan. Tennyson Cooray and Piyumi Purasinghe reprised their role in first film in lead roles along with Chathura Perera, Janesh Silva and Jeevan Handunnetti. Music composed by Keshan Perera. It is the 1105th Sri Lankan film in the Sinhala cinema.

== Cast ==
- Tennyson Cooray as Tarzan 'Ta' / Mason
- Piyumi Purasinghe as Maheshi
- Chathura Perera as Perera
- Janesh Silva as Cowboy
- Jeevan Handunnetti as Nanna
- Susila Kottage as Susila
- D.B. Gangodathenna as Gunda 'Daddy'
- Prasanna Fonseka as Nayakathuma
- Ananda Wickramage as Rival
- Dayaratne Siriwardena as Kiri Honda

== Sequel ==
The sequel of the film, Nathi Bari Tarzan was released on 22 February 2019.
