= Susantha Chandramali =

Sri Lankan actress (1964–2025)

- සුසන්තා චන්ද්‍රමාලි
- Born: Abeysiri Narayana Susantha Chandramali Wanigaratne; 21 February 1964; Mulkirigala, Hambantota, Ceylon
- Died: 1 March 2025 (aged 61)
- Occupation: Actress
- Years active: 1986–2024
- Political party: United People's Freedom Alliance
- Spouse: Kumaru Liyanage (m. 1990)
- Children: Thisuri Yuwanika

Susantha Chandramali (Sinhala: සුසන්තා චන්ද්‍රමාලි; born Abeysiri Narayana Susantha Chandramali Wanigaratne; 21 February 1964 – 1 March 2025) was a Sri Lankan actress in Sri Lankan cinema, theatre and television. She was best known for the dramatic roles in the television serials such as Charulatha, Manokaaya, Sujatha and Kande Gedara.

== Acting career ==
Her maiden cinematic experience came through a supportive role in 2000 blockbuster film Saroja, directed by Somaratne Dissanayake. Some of her popular films are Jaya Pita Jaya, Ran Kevita and Nidahase Piya DS.

== Political career ==
In 2009, Chandramali contested under the United People's Freedom Alliance for the Southern Provincial Council. However, she failed to get elected.

== Personal life and death ==
Susantha Chandramali was born in Mulkirigala, Hambantota on 21 February 1964. She married her husband Kumaru Liyanage on 12 March 1991. The couple had one daughter, Thisuri Yuwanika, who would eventually go on to become a popular teledrama and cinema actress in her own right.

In 2020, Chandramali was diagnosed with stage one cancer. She subsequently underwent treatment to reduce the cancer growth. The treatment was initially successful, and she returned to acting. However, the cancer began to worsen in late 2024 and she was once again hospitalised to undergo more treatment. She died at hospital on 1 March 2025, at the age of 61.

== Selected television serials ==
- Ahas
- Anantha
- Ayomi (2021)
- Chakrandi
- Charulatha
- Denuwara Manike
- Ehipillamak Yata
- Gamane Yaa
- Ganga Saha Nissanka
- Girikula
- Hima Varusa
- Ihirunu Kiri
- Kadathira
- Kadupul Mal
- Kande Gedara
- Manokaya
- Maya Mansala
- Meda Gedara
- Miringu Sayura
- Muthu Palasa
- Pawani
- Pini Wessak
- Raja Varama
- Rajini
- Ranga Soba
- Samanala Wasanthaya
- Samanala Yaya
- Sanda Ginigath Rathriya
- Sanda Gomman Re
- Sanda Numba Nam
- Santhrase
- Sasara Bendi Bemi
- Sihina Cindrella
- Sivusiya Gawwa
- Sudu Hamine
- Sujatha
- Suwanda Yahaluwo
- Thimira Gira
- Visirunu Renu
- Wanawadule Wasanthaya
- Wasanthaya Aran Evith
- Wasuli Kanda
- Weda Mahaththaya

== Filmography ==
Year	Film	Role	Ref.
2000	Saroja	Nurse	
2004	Sumedha		
2005	One Shot	School teacher	
2006	Udugan Yamaya		
2007	Ran Kevita	Suran's mother	
2010	Jaya Pita Jaya	Sandhya	
2011	Nidi Yahana Kalabei		
2013	Ran Kevita 2	Suran's mother	
2015	Pravegaya		
2016	Weerawarna	Ayesha's mother	
2017	Punchi Apith Baya Na Dan	Wimala	
2018	Nidahase Piya DS	Molly Dunuwila	
