= Shanudrie Priyasad =

Sri Lankan actress and singer (born 1997)

- ශනුද්‍රි ප්‍රියසාද්
- Born: Baminnahennadige Shanudrie Priyasad; 8 September 1997 (age 29); Colombo, Sri Lanka
- Education: Royal Institute International School, Colombo . National School of Business Management
- Occupations: Actress; Model; Dancer; Singer; TV Presenter
- Years active: 2002 – present
- Known for: Gamane Yaa; Divithura; Deveni Inima; Angara Dangara; Kolamba Ithaliya
- Spouse: Dinesh Gamage (m. 2026)
- Relatives: Saranga Disasekara (brother-in-law) Dinakshie Priyasad (sister) Sheshadri Priyasad (sister) Krishan Perera (brother-in-law)

Baminnahennadige Shanudrie Priyasad (Sinhala: ශනුද්‍රි ප්‍රියසාද්; born 8 September 1997) is a Sri Lankan actress, dancer, and singer, who appears in Sri Lankan films and television shows. She began her acting career as a child artist.

== Career ==
Her first movie role was in Onna Babo, which was directed by her father, and later she appeared in Rosa Kale, Suwanda Denuna Jeewithe, Angara Dangara and Lantin Singho. She is renowned for her role as Samalka in Deveni Inima teledrama. She has also featured in a Mal Sihinaye music video. She went on to win a Special Jury Award in the Raigam Tele Awards 2009. In 2021, she was cast for Raffealla Fernando Celebrity Calendar along with many other Sri Lankan celebrities. She won Derana Star City Twenty-20 reality show in 2018 with her sister Dinakshie Priyasad.

== Personal life ==
Shanudrie married singer Dinesh Gamage on 6 May 2026, after 6 years of dating him.

== Filmography ==
=== Television ===
- Deveni Inima as Samalka 2017
- Sudu Aguru as Vihara
- Kinduradari 2020
- Gamane Yaa 2021
- Thadi as Nirasha 2021
- Divithura as Esha 2021
- Kolamba Ithaliya as Andrea 2021
- Love in Beijing as Shalanya 2026

=== Web Series ===
- Kiss as Yashora 2020
- Long Weekend 2025

=== Films ===
- No. denotes the Number of Sri Lankan films in the Sri Lankan cinema.

Year	Film	Role
2002	Onna Babo	Shanudrie Senanayake
2008	Rosa Kale	
2010	Suwanda Denuna Jeewithe	Senuri
2011	Angara Dangara	Gagani Wickramasinghe
2015	Lantin Singho	Juliet
2016	Ran Dedunnak	Rashmi
2022	Adaraneeya Prarthana	Menaka
2025	Neera	Praneethi
2025	Moda Tharindu	Dinu
2025	Clarence: Rhythm of the Guitar	Irangani
2026	Adaraneeya Tharuwak	Pathma
TBA	Agnijaya †	
TBA	Plane Tea †	
TBA	Rahai Jeewithe †	

== Awards and nominations ==
In 2012 she received the 'Best Child Actress' award for her role in Sandagiri Pawwa teledrama at the State Television Awards.

- Best Child Actress - State Television Award - Won
- Slim Nielsen Peoples Award 2018 - Tele Drama Actress Of The Year - Won
- Raigam Telees 2017 - Most Popular Actress - Nominated
- Sumathi Awards 2017 - Most Popular Actress - Nominated
- Raigam Telees 2018 - Most Popular Actress - Nominated
- Sumathi Awards 2018 - Most Popular Actress - Nominated
- Derana Fair & Lovely Star City - Winner with @ Dinakshie Priyasad - 2018
- Hiru Mega Stars Season 3 - 2nd Place - with @ Kavindu Madushan - 2021
