= Angara Dangara =

- Film poster
- Sinhala: අඟර දඟර
- Directed by: Nalin Rajapakse
- Written by: Sunil Premaratne
- Produced by: Moon Light Films
- Starring: Shanudrie Priyasad; Roger Seneviratne; Sachini Ayendra
- Cinematography: Nimalsiri Rosa
- Edited by: Gihan Hasantha
- Music by: Wijesundara Weragoda
- Production company: Dil Films
- Release date: 19 February 2011
- Running time: 117 minutes
- Country: Sri Lanka
- Language: Sinhala

Angara Dangara (Sinhala: අඟර දඟර) is a 2011 Sri Lankan Sinhala children's film directed by Nalin Rajapakse and co-produced by Sachini Ayendra and Ishanga Mahipala for Moon Light Films. It stars Shanudrie Priyasad in lead role along with Roger Seneviratne, Nadeeka Gunasekara and Susila Kottage. Music composed by Wijesundara Weragoda. It is the 1155th Sri Lankan film in the Sinhala cinema.

== Plot ==
Gagani is a stubborn teenage girl who is the only child in her family. Her mother, Janaki is also a teacher. Gagani studies at a town school where all teachers and students complain about the mischievous things done by her. Ms. Nadee, who is in charge of sports activities of the school, receives a transfer to Monaragala. Janaki also decides to request for a transfer to Monaragala believing the environment in the village would surely change Gagani's behavior. Gagani refuses to leave her town-school so she is boarded in the hostel. She gets more and more stubborn there while making other hostellers adopt her mischievous behavior. She annoys hostel warden, Ms. Jenny and the hostel chef, Gunawathi but feels pity for Simon who is a mute servant in hostel.

Gagani dislikes the hostel life as there are so much rules that put limits to her freedom. Gagani's parents take her to Monaragala as her principal requests them to do so. In village, Gagani again meets Ms. Nadee, who eventually changes her behavior. Soon, Gagani befriends with her peers there and starts loving to a village life, turning into a decent girl. At the end, Gagani saves a girl from drowning in river, risking her own life and gets praised for her bravery. The film concludes that the environment is a crucial factor that can change one's life and character.

== Cast ==
- Shanudrie Priyasad as Gagani Wickramasinghe
- Nadeeka Gunasekara as Janaki Wickramasinghe
- Roger Seneviratne as Mr. Wickramasinghe
- Susila Kottage as Miss Jenny
- Sanath Gunathilake as Principal Pathirana
- Kumara Thirimadura as Simon
- Sachini Ayendra as Miss Nadee
- Nilmini Kottegoda as Gunawathi
- Shirani Priyasad as Miss Kanthi
- Jeewani Nirupa as Miss Warsha

== Soundtrack ==
No.	Title	Singer(s)	Length
1.	"Seethala Meedum Kadu Theere"	Uresha Ravihari	4:20
2.	"Sulange Seethala Danena"	Punsara Wagasarani	3:12
3.	"Mulu Lowa Labunath"	Roger Seneviratne	2:06
