= Lucky Dias =

Sri Lankan actor

- Born: Palandha Pathirage Lakshman Calistus Dias; 5 February 1951 (age 75)
- Occupation: Actor
- Years active: 1986-Present
- Known for: actor and movie producer
- Spouse: Malini Fonseka (1986-2011)
- Awards: Presidential Film Award (1998)

Palandha Pathirage Lakshman Calistus Dias, popularly known as Lucky Dias (ලකී ඩයස් born 5 February 1951), is an actor in Sri Lankan cinema and teledrama as well as a producer and director. He entered films in 1986 guided by his mentor, a famous actor and film director, Gamini Fonseka. He did the first hosting of Obada Lakshapathi Mamada Lakshapathi, Sri Lankan version of Who Wants to Be a Millionaire?. On 12 June 1986, he married Malini Fonseka, Sri Lankan film actress and divorced in 2011. He got the Presidential Film Award in 1998.

== Filmography ==
Key
| † | Denotes films that have not yet been released |

| Year | Film | Role | Ref. |
|---|---|---|---|
| 1981 | Vajira | ASP Anni | |
| 1985 | Sura Duthiyo | | |
| 1987 | Ahinsa | Suresh | |
| 1988 | Gedara Budun Amma | Punchi Banda | |
| 1988 | Angulimala | | |
| 1988 | Nawa Gilunath Ban Chun | Pradeep Dalagedara | |
| 1989 | Shakthiya Obai Amme | Samari | |
| 1989 | Siri Medura | Lawyer Siri Samarawickrama | |
| 1990 | Jaya Shakthi | | |
| 1990 | Honda Honda Sellam | Jagath Ihalawaththa | |
| 1991 | Paradise | Raja (also as producer) | |
| 1991 | Madhusamaya | Doctor | |
| 1991 | Suwandena Suwandaka | Amith Gunawardana | |
| 1992 | Kulageya | Mervin Dias | |
| 1992 | Sathya | also as producer. | |
| 1993 | Prathigna | Lakshman Kulatunga | |
| 1994 | Landuni Oba Devaganaki | Bajaj Lucky | |
| 1994 | Jayagrahanaya | | |
| 1994 | Sanda Madala | Sagara Bandara Keerthisena / Pradeep Keerthisena | |
| 1994 | 150 Mulleriyawa | 'Lucky Dias' patient / Michael | |
| 1995 | Maruthaya | Patrick | |
| 1995 | Awaragira | Wickramasooriya aka Wickrama | |
| 1994 | Sudu Piruwata | Lawyer Rathnayake | |
| 1997 | Yasoma | | |
| 1997 | Dehena | Rajasekara | |
| 1998 | Anthima Reya | Devendra Silva. (also as producer) | |
| 1999 | Salupata Ahasata | Prema's husband | |
| 2000 | Anuragay Ananthaya | Sisira Gunathilake | |
| 2003 | Wekande Walauwa | Lawyer Mr. Muthugoda | |
| 2009 | Sir Last Chance | Mister Producer | |
| 2010 | Suwanda Denuna Jeewithe | Guest appearance | |
| 2011 | Challenges | Esala Randunu | |
| 2012 | Senasuru Maruwa | Mahil Ranadewa | |
| 2013 | It’s a Matter of Love | Malan's father | |
| 2014 | Ahelepola Kumarihami | Patrick | |
| 2014 | Anagarika Dharmapala Srimathano | News editor | |
| 2014 | Api Marenne Na | Ginige | |
| 2015 | Maharaja Gemunu | Minister Mahananda | |
| 2015 | Gindari | Himself | |
| 2016 | Paththini | King Gajaba | |
| 2019 | Rush | Sunil Wijemanne | |
| 2019 | President Super Star | multiple roles | |
| 2021 | Kawuruth Danne Na | | |
| 2022 | Rashmi | | |
| 2024 | Sihinayaki Adare | Ronnie Fernandez | |
| 2024 | Weerya | Leonard Jayawardena | |
| 2024 | Gini Avi Saha Gini Keli 2 | Samson | |
| TBA | Gunananda Himi Migettuwatte † | | |
| TBA | Sithija Seya † | | |

== Television serials ==
- Bharyawo
- Eha Ivura
- Gauthami
- Iqbal as Imran
- Kemmura
- Kulawamiya
- Magi
- Miriguwen Eha'
- Muthu Ataye Modayo
- Nannadunanni
- Sahas Gaw Dura as Sampath
- Sankranthi Samaya
- Shaun
- Seethala Gini Del
- Sihina Sithuvam
- Sive Diya Dahara
- Sohayuro as Mahendra
- Sulangata Mediwi
- Suwanda Obai Amme
- Swetha Gantheera
- Wassa Nuba Wage
- Yashorawaya as Baladeva
- Yes Boss as Nihal Kariyawasam

== As a Producer ==
- Paradeesey (1991)
- Sathya (1992)
- Anthima Reya (1998)

== Directed films and tv serials ==
- Breaking News (upcoming)
- Katharaka Hasareli
- Sanda Tharaka
- Sannasi Premaya. It is the first teledrama to be filmed by a smartphone in Sri Lanka.
- Sasara Ivuru
- Seethala Gini Dal (2016)
- Sivdiya Dahara
- Suwanda Obai Amme

== As an Announcer ==
- Obada Lakshapathi Mamada Lakshapathi (2010)
