= Zoom (2016 Sinhala film) =

2016 horror romantic film

- Film poster
- Sinhala: සූම්
- Directed by: Sameera Wackwella
- Written by: Sameera Wackwella
- Starring: Sheshadri Priyasad; Hemal Ranasinghe; Dinakshie Priyasad
- Cinematography: Upul Priyan
- Edited by: Anura Bandara
- Music by: Gayan Perera
- Production companies: Zoom Films; Dil Films International Ltd.
- Release date: 16 December 2016
- Country: Sri Lanka
- Language: Sinhala
- Budget: LKR 8.5 million

Zoom (Sinhala: සූම්) is a 2016 Sri Lankan Sinhalese horror romantic film directed by Sameera Wackwella and co-produced by Dhammika Abeysena and Praveen Jayaratne for Dil Films International Limited. It stars Sheshadri Priyasad, Hemal Ranasinghe and Dinakshie Priyasad in lead roles along with Jayalath Manoratne and Douglas Ranasinghe. Music composed by Gayan Perera. It is the 1267th Sri Lankan film in the Sinhalese cinema. It is the first 3D film produced in Sri Lanka.

== Plot ==
Two of the main characters are twin sisters Naduli and Sanuli. Naduli and Nisal are in a relationship but suddenly after an unfortunate accident Naduli dies. Sanuli believes that she is to blame for her sister's death as it is due to her mistake that Naduli meets with an untimely death. She suffers mentally. Naduli's soul takes advantage of Sanuli's mental state and takes over her body with the hope of reuniting with Nisal.

The twin's parents, Nisal and a renowned professor try their best to exorcise Naduli's soul out of Sanuli's body. When they believe that they have almost succeeded the story takes an unexpected turn.

Which twin will survive? That is a question that will pop up in the audience's mind as they watch Zoom.

== Cast ==
- Sheshadri Priyasad as Shanuli
- Dinakshie Priyasad as Naduli
- Hemal Ranasinghe as Nisal
- Jayalath Manoratne as Scientist
- Douglas Ranasinghe as Shanuli and Naduli's father
- Anoja Weerasinghe
- Chamila Peiris as Shanuli and Naduli's mother
- Chaminda Udagedara
- Thushani de Silva

== Soundtrack ==
No.	Title	Singer(s)	Length
1.	"Harada Oba Mathuda"	Nirosha Virajini, Adeesha Ranaweera
2.	"Mata Danena me Haguma"	Nelu Adhikari
3.	"Athin Athata Hirimal"	Udara
4.	"Aththata Lankara Gannath Ba"	Sachith Peiris, Natasha Rathnayake
