= Challenges (film) =

- Sinhala: චැලෙන්ජස්
- Directed by: Udayakantha Warnasuriya
- Written by: Udayakantha Warnasuriya
- Based on: Bommarillu
- Produced by: Sunflower Films
- Starring: Sheshadri Priyasad; Pubudu Chathuranga; Roshan Ranawana
- Cinematography: Jayanath Gunawardana
- Edited by: Praveen Jayaratne
- Music by: Sai Gurunath
- Production company: Sunflower Films
- Release dates: March 11, 2011 (Wellawatte, Sri Lanka)
- Running time: 131 minutes
- Country: Sri Lanka
- Language: Sinhalese

Challenges (Sinhala: චැලෙන්ජස්) is a 2011 Sri Lankan Sinhala romantic comedy film directed by Udayakantha Warnasuriya and co-produced by Ranjith Jayasuriya, Pravin Jayaratne, Ajith Priyantha and Udayakantha Warnasuriya for Sunflower Films. Remake or based on the Telugu movie Bommarillu. Starring Siddharth & Genelia It stars Sheshadri Priyasad, Pubudu Chathuranga and Roshan Ranawana in lead roles along with Lucky Dias and Vasanthi Chathurani. Music composed by Sai Gurunath. It is the 1154th Sri Lankan film in the Sinhala cinema.

It became the first Sri Lankan box office hit of 2011. Challenges was released on 11 March 2011 nationally and premiered at the Savoy Theatre, Wellawatte on 10 March in a celebrity premiere screening. The film has been shot in Colombo, Nuwara Eliya, Colombo and Nilaveli areas. A website www.challengesmovie.com was launched in October 2010.

== Plot ==
The story of revolves around Ranuk Randunu whose father is Professor Esala Randunu. In childhood itself Ranuk is taught to take responsibilities and to be a disciplined citizen. Grooming to be a handsome youth, Ranuk falls in love with Sharanya who is a beautiful girl. Yet there is a challenge for Ranuk in the way of her own cousin Kishan. A love triangle forms and Ranuk realises that life's challenges are much harder than just winning the heart of his love.

== Cast ==
- Sheshadri Priyasad as Sharanya
- Pubudu Chathuranga as Ranuk Randunu
- Roshan Ranawana as Kishan
- Lucky Dias as Esala Randunu, Ranuk's father
- Vasanthi Chathurani as Ranuk's mother
- Sangeetha Weeraratne as Gayesha, competition organizer
- Janaki Wijerathna as Judge
- Oshini Liyanage as Sharanya's friend
- Dilshani Perera as Senuli
- Sarath Chandrasiri as Bag thief

== Soundtrack ==
The songs were composed by Sai Gurunath. The song "Eka Fantasy Heeneka" is based on "Appudo Ippudo" from Bommarillu (2006).

No.	Title	Singer(s)	Length
1.	"Lassana Dawasaka"	Bachi Susan
2.	"Athagili Alla"	Chilitha Weerakkody
3.	"Napurukamata"	Nalin Perera
4.	"Api Wemu Romeo"	Bachi Susan
5.	"Prarthana Bidee"	Surendra Perera, Abhisheka Wimalaweera, Nadee Kahatapitiya, Dillon Lamb
6.	"Eka Fantasy Heeneka Man"	Uresha Ravihari, Lesley Thomas
7.	"Madahas Palama"	Kushani Sandarekha, Thilina Ruhunage
