= Dinakshie Priyasad =

Sri Lankan actress and presenter (born 1970)

- දිනක්ෂි ප්‍රියසාද්
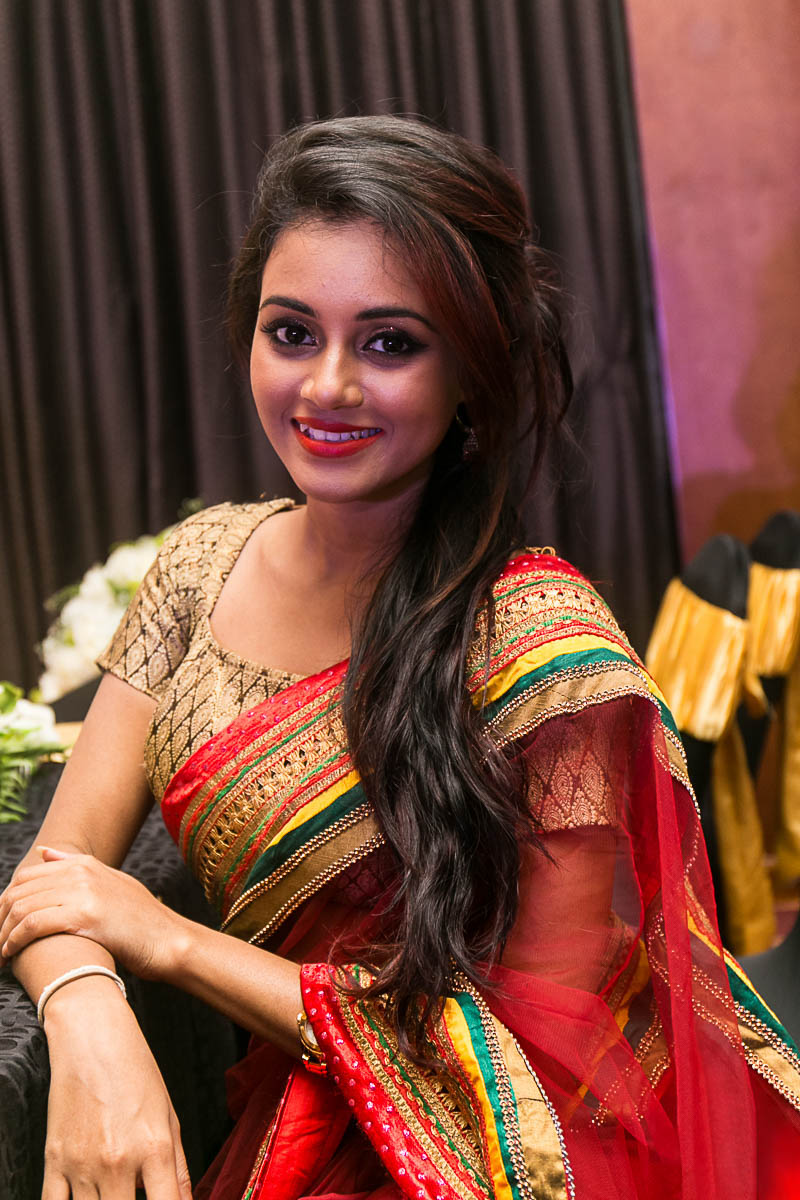
- Priyasad at an event in 2016
- Born: Baminnahennadige Dinakshie Priyasad; 18 March 1990 (age 36); Colombo, Sri Lanka
- Education: Holy Family Convent, Bambalapitiya · Royal Institute International School, Colombo
- Alma mater: Open University of Sri Lanka; University of Sri Jayewardenepura
- Occupations: Actress; TV presenter
- Years active: 1997 – Present
- Spouse: Saranga Disasekara (m. 2020)
- Children: Saranya Disasekara
- Parent(s): Dinesh Priyasad (father); Shiranie Priyasad (mother)
- Relatives: Sheshadri Priyasad (sister); Shanudrie Priyasad (sister)

Baminnahennadige Dinakshie Priyasad (born 18 March 1990) (Sinhala: දිනක්ෂි ප්‍රියසාද්) is a Sri Lankan actress and television presenter. Priyasad made her acting debut at the age of two in the film Apaye Thathpara 84,000 directed by her father Dinesh Priyasad.

== Early life ==
Dinakshie Priyasad was born in Colombo, Sri Lanka on 18 March 1990. She is the first of three daughters of Dinesh Priyasad and Shirani Priyasad. She and her family members are devout Catholics. Her father Dinesh is a film director, who pioneered various technologies and graphics for Sri Lankan cinema. His best known film is the 1995 action film Demodara Palama starring Gamini Fonseka. Dinakshie's mother has produced films directed by her father. Dinakshie has two younger sisters Sheshadri Priyasad and Shanudrie Priyasad, who are also actresses in Sri Lankan cinema and television.

Dinakshie attended the Holy Family Convent, Bambalapitiya up to the ordinary level (O/L) examination and completed her pre-university studies at the Royal Institute International School in the Maths Stream. Thereafter, she joined the Open University of Sri Lanka and is currently studying engineering for her Bachelor's degree. She is also doing her diploma in Media and Mass Communication at the University of Sri Jayewardenepura.

== Career ==
Though it was in 1992 as a 2-year-old that Dinakshie made her acting debut in her father's film Apaye Thathpara 84,000. Her first major acting role came in 2009 in the television drama version of Upul Shantha Sannasgala's renowned romantic novel Wassana Sihinaya. The teledrama was produced and directed by Janaka Siriwardana and Kavindya Jayasekara penned the script.

In 2009, she was seen in the teledrama Sanda Giri Pawwa portraying the main role of a teacher in a rural area. She has stated that this was the most challenging role she has portrayed, as the character was a teacher who came from extreme poverty to excel in life and the sensitive emotions involved were challenging to depict. Also, the filming was done in extremely harsh rural areas in the Kurunagala district. Her next teledrama was Hithata Wahal eemith Kaviratne's popular picture story that appeared in the Siththara weekly in the seventies. The teledrama was directed by Mohan Niyaz where Dinakshie portrays the character of Nimmi.

In 2019, News4masses adjudged Dinakshie as the number one among the 'Most Beautiful Actresses and Models' in Sri Lanka. Dinakshie happens to be one of the very few who rose to the top slot from the TV presenter and teledrama artist.

Dinakshie has also appeared as the lead in four music videos by the artists Tehan Perera – Unuhuma, Prabudda Geetha Ruchi – Yahamin duka kiyaganna, Doctor Band – Aya Enathura, and Billy Fernando – Ra Ahase. In 2021, she was cast in Raffealla Fernando's Celebrity Calendar along with many other Sri Lankan celebrities.

== Filmography ==
=== Films ===
Key
†	Denotes films that have not yet been released

Year	Title	Role	Notes
1992	Apaye Tathpara 84,000	Malini's baby Daughter	Child artist
2013	Double Trouble	Theja	
2015	Me Wage Adarayak	Serina	Merit awards Sarasaviya Awards, Presidential Film Awards
2016	Ran Dedunnak	Roshan's sister	
2016	Zoom	Naduli Stella Cooray	
2020	Suparna	Sumali	
2024	Visal Adare	Saara	
2024	Mandara	Kavi	
2024	Wishma		
2025	Rosa Adare	Sachini	
2025	Rhythm of the Guitar: Clarence	Indrani Perera	
2026	Mr. Missis	Anjali Sooriyabandara	
TBA	Cricket Sadu †		

=== Selected television serials ===
- Ammawarune
- Baddata Saha Kuliyata
- Chanchala Rekha
- Gemunu Maharaja
- Hithata Wahal Weemi
- Husma Wetena Mal
- Konkala Doni
- Mini Gan Dela
- Nirasha
- Oba Enna Awith Yanna
- Paradeese
- Patti Gedara
- Pirimi Lamai
- Piyavi
- Roda Thune Manamali
- Sandagiri Pawwa
- Take Care as Menaka
- Wes
- Yaya 4

=== Webseries ===
Year	Title	Channel
2023	Under one Roof	MCC Prime
2020	.Com	Ceylix
