= Danushka Rathnayaka =

- Born: Thalpage Danushka Priyankara Rathnayaka; Homagama, Sri Lanka
- Education: National Film Corporation of Sri Lanka
- Occupations: Film director,Actor
- Years active: 2005–present
- Known for: Wes, Bio, Daam, Kiya Denna Adare Tharam
- Spouse: Married
- Children: 2

Danushka Rathnayaka (born Thalpage Danushka Priyankara Rathnayaka) is a Sri Lankan television and film director, audiovisual media specialist and photographer. He has worked in the Sri Lankan media and entertainment industry since 2005.Rathnayaka began his career as a production assistant at Young Asia Television in 2005. He later worked in television production, directing, cinematography and audiovisual production. He is the founder and executive director of Veenavee Studio and Veenavee Audio Visual Academy.

== Early life and career ==
Rathnayaka is from Homagama, Sri Lanka. He began his professional career in 2005 as a production assistant at Young Asia Television (YATV), where he worked from 2005 to 2007.He subsequently developed his career in television and audiovisual production, working in directing, cinematography, photography and production.His acting debut was in the Swarnavahini television drama Jeevithaya Lassanayi in 2007. His directorial debut was the television drama Mauna Yagaya, broadcast on Rupavahini in 2016.

== Directing ==
Rathnayaka has directed a number of Sri Lankan television dramas broadcast on several television networks, including Hiru TV, Swarnavahini, ITN, Sirasa TV and TV Derana.His television directing credits include:

- Mauna Yagaya – Rupavahini (2016)
- Wes – Swarnavahini (2018)
- Heily – TV Derana (2019)
- Daam – Sirasa TV (2020)
- Kiya Denna Adare Tharam – Sirasa TV (2021)
- Hitha Laga Hinahuna – Sirasa TV (2021)
- Mandaram Kathawe – ITN (2023)
- Bio – Swarnavahini (2023)
- See You – Swarnavahini (2024)
- Aththamai Man Oyaata Adarei – Hiru TV (2026)

He has also been involved in film and audiovisual productions, including the short film Magic Box.

== Acting ==
Rathnayaka has appeared in a number of Sri Lankan television dramas as an actor. His acting credits include:

- Jeevithaya Lassanayi – Swarnavahini (2007)
- Muthu Kirilli – ITN (2008–2009)
- Whinna Muthu Wassak – Swarnavahini (2009)
- Ahas Gawwa – Swarnavahini (2010)
- Muthu Warusa – ITN (2010)
- Sanda Pini Bindaka – Hiru TV (2013)
- Chaya – Sirasa TV (2014)
- Wes – Swarnavahini (2018)
- Daam – Sirasa TV
- Heily – Derana TV (2023)

== Veenavee Studio ==
In 2011, Rathnayaka founded Veenavee Studio and Veenavee Audio Visual Academy, where he serves as founder and executive director.The organisation is involved in photography, cinematography, audiovisual production and media training. Rathnayaka's work includes commercial photography and cinematography, multi-camera productions, creative wedding documentaries and training programmes for aspiring cinematographers and media students.

== Other professional work ==
Rathnayaka has worked in several areas of audiovisual production, including cinematography, photography, television production, post-production and creative team management.He has also served as an official judge for an All Island School Art and Short Video Competition associated with the Ministry of Health and the Sri Lanka College of Psychiatrists.

== Education ==
Rathnayaka completed a one-year Diploma in Filmmaking at the National Film Corporation of Sri Lanka. He graduated from the programme in 2024, with the certificate issued in 2026. The programme was registered under the Tertiary and Vocational Education Commission (TVEC).The programme included studies in cinematography, film directing, film editing, writing for screen, narrative structures of cinema, cinema aesthetics, cinema and society, and film theory and criticism.His final project was the short film Magic Box, which received a grade of B.He also completed an Announcing Course at the Katahanda Media Foundation.In 2005, he participated in a Peace Journalism Workshop conducted by Young Asia Television in collaboration with the Friedrich-Ebert-Stiftung.

== Awards and recognition ==
In 2019, the television drama Wes, directed by Rathnayaka, received the Raigam Tele'es Most Popular Teledrama of the Year award.In 2023, Rathnayaka received the Raigam Tele'es Jury Special Award for Best Direction for the television drama Bio. He received a Certificate of Appreciation as a director from the Faculty of Graduate Studies of the University of Sri Jayewardenepura for directing the drama Divi Apeksha as part of the university's 50th anniversary celebrations. In 2023, he was recognised as an official judge for the "Building resilience through inclusive diversity" All Island School Art and Short Video Competition associated with the Sri Lanka College of Psychiatrists and the Ministry of Health.

== Filmography ==
=== As director ===
Year	Title	Network / Production	Role
2016	Mauna Yagaya	Rupavahini	Director
2018	Wes	Swarnavahini	Director
2019	Heily	TV Derana	Director
2020	Daam	Sirasa TV	Director
2021	Kiya Denna Adare Tharam	Sirasa TV	Director
2021	Hitha Laga Hinahuna	Sirasa TV	Director
2023	Mandaram Kathawe	ITN	Director
2023	Bio	Swarnavahini	Director
2024	See You	Swarnavahini	Director
2026	Aththamai Man Oyaata Adarei	Hiru TV	Director

=== As actor ===
Year	Title	Network
2007	Jeevithaya Lassanayi	Swarnavahini
2008–2009	Muthu Kirilli	ITN
2009	Whinna Muthu Wassak	Swarnavahini
2010	Ahas Gawwa	Swarnavahini
2010	Muthu Warusa	ITN
2013	Sanda Pini Bindaka	Hiru TV
2014	Chaya	Sirasa TV
2018	Wes	Swarnavahini
	Daam	Sirasa TV
2023	Heaily	Derana TV
