= Saranga Disasekara =

Sri Lankan actor, singer, model (born 1983)

- සාරංග දිසාසේකර
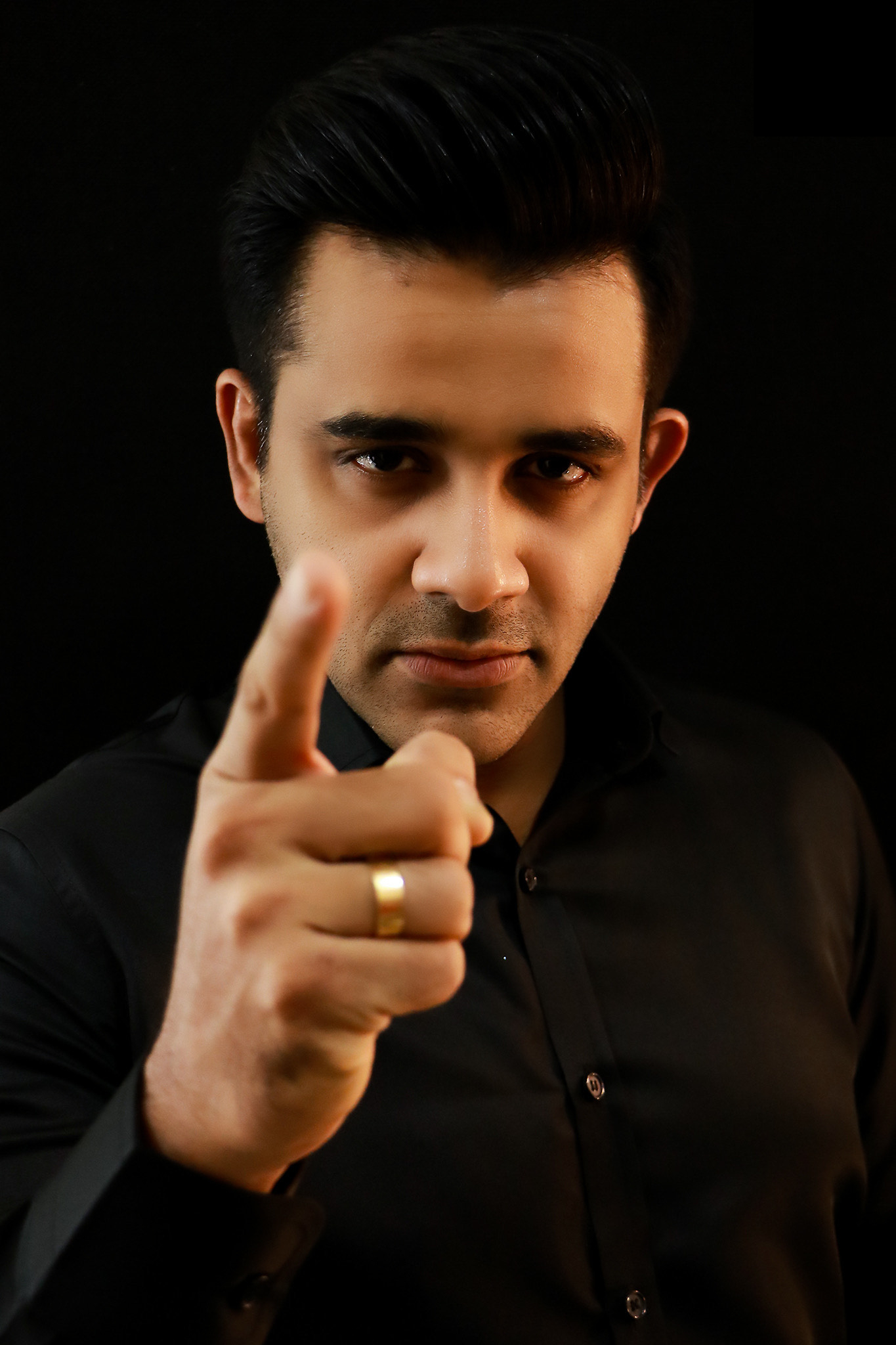
- Born: 31 January 1983 (age 43); Kalubowila, Sri Lanka
- Education: Thurstan College; Northumbria University
- Occupations: Actor, entrepreneur, presenter
- Years active: 2003 – Present
- Height: 183 cm (6 ft 0 in)
- Spouse: Umali Thilakarathne (m. 2014; div. 2018) Dinakshie Priyasad (m. 2020)
- Children: Saranya Disasekara (daughter)
- Parents: Narada Disasekara (father); Tileka Ranasinghe (mother)
- Relatives: Douglas Ranasinghe (uncle); Dinesh Priyasad (Father-in-Law); Sheshadri Priyasad (Sister-in-Law); Shanudrie Priyasad (Sister-in-Law)

Saranga Disasekara (Sinhala: සාරංග දිසාසේකර; born 31 January 1983) is a Sri Lankan actor, singer, model and a host by profession. Saranga was awarded the most popular television actor in Sri Lanka award at Sumathi Awards, Raigam Tele'es and SLIM-Nielsen Peoples Awards several times. Currently, he is hosting reality programme Hiru Star.

== Early life ==
Saranga Disasekara was born on 31 January 1983 in Kalubowila, Sri Lanka, to singer Narada Disasekara, and radio host and actress Tileka Ranasinghe. He completed school life at Thurstan College, Colombo and graduated from Northumbria University, Newcastle. Saranga's uncle Douglas Ranasinghe is also a popular artist in Sri Lanka.

After completing computer science for his higher studies, he entered commercials and minor cinema acting.

== Career ==
At the age of 10, Saranga acted in the short film Marana Samapthiya. Then he was involved with many television commercials and radio castings.

His debut film in a major role was Nil Diya Yahana opposite Chathurika Peiris, which was directed by Dayaratne Ratagedara. However, his maiden cinema acting came through the 2003 film Irasma in a minor role.

He has acted in many popular teledramas in all genre from drama, tragedy, thriller and comedy. His most notable acting came through plays like Sulanga Matha Mohothak, Bonda Meedum, Kalu Kurulla, Wassane Premaya, Haara Kotiya, Kotipathiyo and Wes.

He has acted three stage dramas, Silgath Kokku, Mee Harak and Pirimiyekgen Paminillak.

=== Selected television serials ===
- Agni Piyapath
- Ahankara Nagare
- Akuru Maki Na
- Alawanthi
- Alu Baduna
- Batahira Ahasa
- Binara Mali
- Bonda Meedum as Dhanuka Rambukwella
- Chanchala Rekha
- Daam (Sri Lankan television series)
- Eran Landu
- Ganga Addara as Ranjit
- Haara Kotiya as Lara Kumara
- Hansa Pihatu
- Hedi
- Hithuwakkari
- Hiru Awidin
- Husma Watena Mal
- Kalu Kurulla
- Kotipathiyo
- Lansupathiniyo
- Mini Gan Dela as Stephen
- Muthu Palasa
- Nirasha
- Oba Enna Awith Yanna
- Paba
- Pabasara
- Pipi Piyum
- Ran Samanalayo as Nilanga
- R.A.T
- Renagala Walawwa
- Sandawatha Seya
- Sandupama
- Sansarini
- Salli Pokuru
- Sasara Bendi Bemi
- Smarana Samapthi
- Siyapath Arama
- Sulanga Matha Mohothak
- Take Care as Wasala
- Wassanaye Premaya
- Wehi Pabalu Sela
- Wes
- Yaya 4

== Filmography ==
Key
| † | Denotes films that have not yet been released |

| Year | Film | Role | Notes |
|---|---|---|---|
| 2003 | Irasma | Irasma's elder cousin | minor role |
| 2008 | Nil Diya Yahana | Shanuka | |
| 2011 | Suseema | Asela | |
| 2012 | Super Six | Jude | |
| 2013 | It’s a Matter of Love | Malan | |
| 2013 | Sri Siddhartha Gautama | Channa | |
| 2014 | Rupantharana | Captain Suraweera | |
| 2015 | Maharaja Gemunu | Saddha Tissa | |
| 2016 | July 7 | Saranga | |
| 2016 | Adaraneeya Kathawak | Reality show host | |
| 2016 | Ape Kaalaye Patachara | Jeewantha | |
| 2018 | Nidahase Piya DS | SWRD Bandaranaike | |
| 2018 | Sarungal | Bhanuka | |
| 2019 | Sangile | Sundaraa | |
| 2019 | Rush | Rushantha 'Shan' | |
| 2022 | Ashawari | Ranesh's uncle | |
| 2024 | Wishma | | |
| 2025 | Rhythm of the Guitar: Clarence | Annesley Malewana | |
| 2026 | Adaraneeya Tharuwak | Nikalesh / Siril | |
| TBA | Thanapathilage Gedara † | | |
| TBA | Yathra † | | |

== Awards ==
| Year | Award | Category | Result |
|---|---|---|---|
| 2011 | Sumathi Awards | Most Popular Actor | Won |
| 2012 | Raigam Tele'es | Most Popular Actor | Won |
| 2013 | Raigam Tele'es | Most Popular Actor | Won |
| 2015 | Raigam Tele'es | Most Popular Actor | Won |
| 2016 | Raigam Tele'es | Most Popular Actor | Won |
| 2024 | Raigam Tele'es | Most Popular Actor | Won |
| 2024 | Sumathi Awards | Most Popular Actor | Won |
