= Malaka Dewapriya =

Sri Lankan film maker, visual artist, writer and director

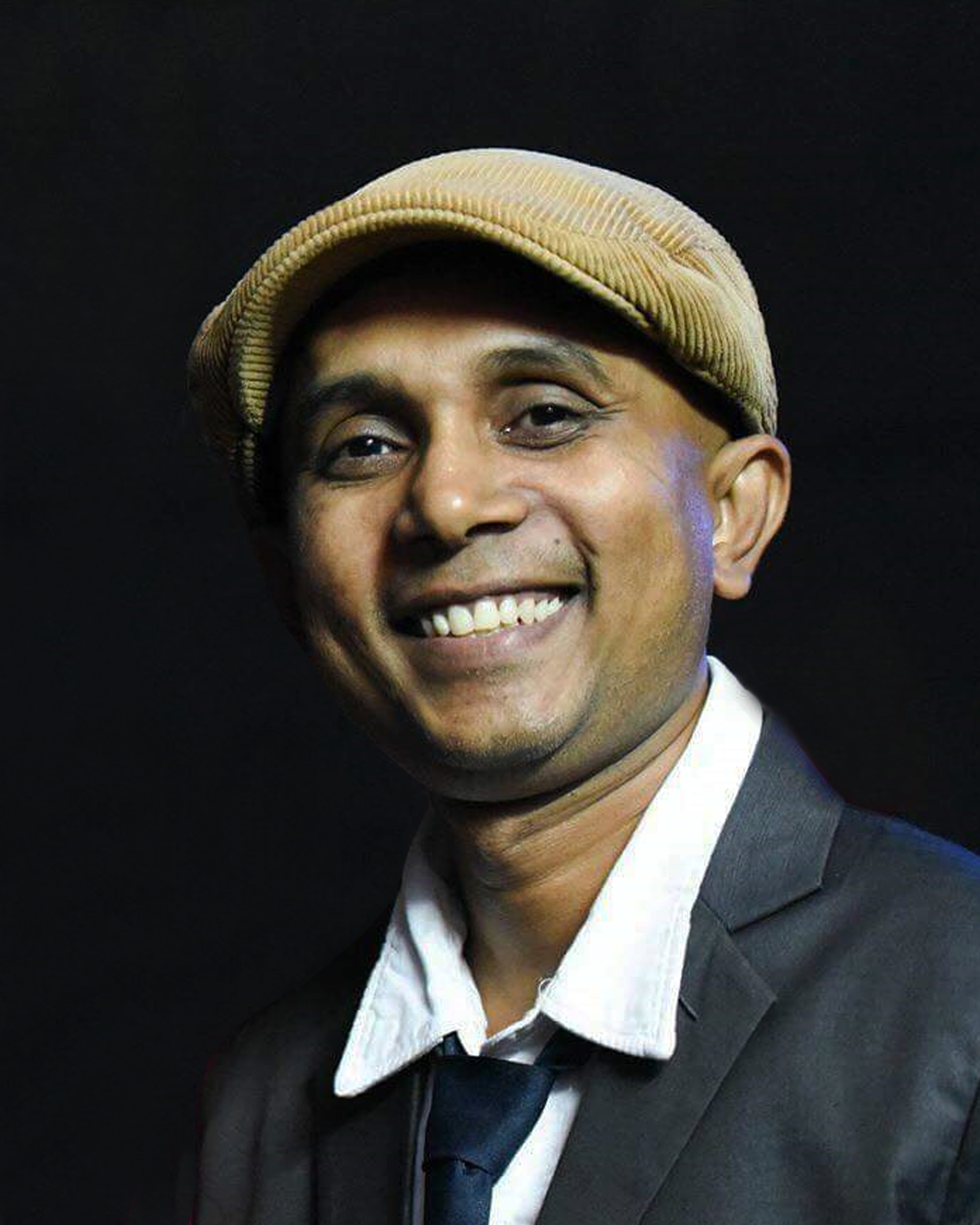
- Born: Grardhiwasam Lindamulage Malaka Dewapriya; Colombo
- Other names: Malaka Devapriya, Mālaka Dēvapriya
- Education: Akademie Schloss Solitude; University of Colombo; Ananda College
- Occupations: Film maker and visual artist
- Known for: visual arts and film

Malaka Dewapriya (Sinhala: මාලක දේවප්‍රිය, IPA: [maːləkə deːʋaprijə]) is a Sri Lankan film maker, visual artist, Sinhala Radio Play writer, short film and video director.

== Biography ==
Born in Sri Lanka, Malaka Dewapriya earned his BA (Special) from the University of Colombo in 2005. Following graduation, he was awarded the prestigious Baden-Württemberg scholarship for Video/Film/New Media, which enabled him to pursue an academy program at Akademie Schloss Solitude in Stuttgart, Germany (2007–2008). He was awarded the Asia Pacific Artists Fellowship, supporting his short-term residency as a visiting artist at the GoYang Art Studio—part of,National Museum of Contemporary Art in Seoul, South Korea, from 2008–2009 ("5th period", "no. 671").

Dewapriya’s artistic journey began in theatre, where he started performing, writing, and directing short plays as early as 1989. Over the years, his practice has evolved into a richly interdisciplinary one, encompassing film, photography, theatre, and radio drama.

Dewapriya holds the distinction of being the first filmmaker in the history of Sri Lankan cinema to present a film internationally as a student director.

An interdisciplinary artist working across audio and visual media, Dewapriya is deeply committed to revitalizing Sri Lankan radio drama through alternative platforms. His oeuvre includes a range of innovative productions that challenge conventional aesthetics and seek to re-engage public audiences with the expressive potential of sound-based storytelling.

Critics have hailed his debut feature, Bahuchithawadiya (The Undecided), as the fourth turning point in Sri Lankan cinema, citing its conceptual boldness, its innovative use of visual and sonic narrative that departs from traditional forms, and its philosophical portrayal of social life.

Beyond his creative output, Dewapriya has played a vital role in shaping Sri Lanka’s cultural landscape.

== Short films experience ==
Dewapriya emerged onto the Sri Lankan cinematic landscape as a pioneering student filmmaker. His early short film Anxiety (Sammanaru) was awarded Best Film by the National Youth Services Council (NYSCO) Video Production team in 1998—an early testament to his bold aesthetic and thematic sensibilities. As a student of the acclaimed Sri Lankan filmmaker Dharmasena Pathiraja, Dewapriya carried forward a legacy of socially engaged cinema, though refracted through experimental forms and global dialogues. His short films have garnered international acclaim and played a vital role in re-establishing a culture of student short filmmaking in Sri Lanka. In 2004, while still an undergraduate at the University of Colombo, Dewapriya’s short film Life Circle (5:31) was selected for the juried competition at the 10th International Student Film Festival in Tel Aviv, Israel—held from 5 to 12 June. According to Sunday Times, this marked the first time a Sri Lankan student film had been chosen for a recognised international film festival history of Cinema of Sri Lanka. The selection as a crucial moment for revitalising short film culture in Sri Lanka." "This was the first time a Sri Lankan student's film was chosen in an internationally recognised festival. And the selection was a big step to re-establish short film culture in Sri Lanka."

Life Circle went on to be screened at numerous international venues, including the Chimera 25th Anniversary Digital Video Student Film Festival in New York, Cinestud International Student Film Festival in Amsterdam, and the Osian Cinefan Film Festival’s Talent Campus Forum in New Delhi(2004 and 2005). His short experimental film Exchange, exploring "colonial Sri Lanka under the British rule", was presented under the auspices of the University of Colombo and became "The first Sri Lankan entry" at the Tokyo Short Shorts Film Festival in October 2004. Screened under Program A: "Short Shorts: Ghost Short Shorts," the work showcased Dewapriya’s ability to interrogate historical memory through non-linear form and thematic fragmentation.

In 2006, Dewapriya’s 30-minute short Transference received the "Silver TEN Award" in the Short Films category at the inaugural Mumbai, India, International Sport Movies & TV (FICTS) Festival. The film was also selected for screening at the South Asia Film Festival New Delhi, the Berlin Asia Film Festival, and the Karafilm Festival in Karachi, consolidating his presence across key South Asian and European cinematic flatforms.

Today, Another short film developed during his residency at Akademie Schloss Solitude in Stuttgart, Germany, was chosen for the final round of the CinemadaMare Film Festival in Italy in 2008, competing among over 150 directors in the semi-finals

Dewapriya’s innovative engagement with the short film genre revitalized its cultural significance in Sri Lanka. Moving beyond its traditional framing as student work or marginal practice, he positioned short filmmaking as a distinct aesthetic form. Through technically sophisticated and socially attuned works, Dewapriya affirmed its potential for narrative complexity, public engagement, and media innovation.

== Filmography ==
=== Full Length Films ===
Year	Title	Credited as			Notes
Year	Title	Directors	Screenwriters	Producers	Notes
2018	Bahuchithawadiya (The Undecided)	Yes	Yes	Yes	

Bahuchithawadiya(The Undecided) has indeed stirred critical discourse as a landmark in Sri Lankan cinema. Critics have positioned it as the fourth major rupture in the cinematic tradition, following the stylistic and thematic shifts introduced by Lester James Peries, Dharmasena Pathiraja, and Asoka Handagama. Film has become a landmark in contemporary Sri Lankan cinema, igniting broad and multi-disciplinary critical discourse. The film has attracted sustained attention across traditional and digital media, inviting divergent readings on its aesthetic, ideological, and socio-political layers.This critical momentum has produced a rich body of commentary, with Thilak Kodagoda’s 350-page monograph, Ehima Sudumeli Pitapathak, emerging as a standout. His work offers a deep formal, symbolic, and contextual analysis, situating the film within the evolving landscape of Sri Lankan cinematic modernity.

Philosophical Depth: The film explores themes of alienation, desire, and the illusion of mobility. It’s not just about going abroad — it’s about the existential weight of being stuck in between, both socially and psychologically.

Conceptual Boldness: The film interrogates the fragmented psyche of post-war youth, especially those caught between economic precarity and digital escapism. The protagonist, Sasitha, embodies the “Bahuchithawadiya” — the undecided, multi-minded figure adrift in virtual and real worlds.

Narrative Innovation: Dewapriya blends realist and surrealist modes, using Facebook chats, Skype calls, and digital interfaces as narrative devices. This breaks from conventional linear storytelling and introduces a hybrid visual grammar.

Sonic and Visual Language: The use of cinematography creates a layered sensory experience that mirrors the protagonist’s fractured interiority.

Sound design incorporates: The film’s music and sound design incorporates ambient urban noise, digital glitches, and intimate voiceovers, crafting a sonic landscape that’s as disorienting as its central character.

International Recognition: The film premiered in the NETPAC (Network for the Promotion of Asia Pacific Cinema) in the competition section competition section at the 40th Moscow International Film Festival 2018, where it was part of the “Discovery: Sri Lankan Cinema” showcase. It went on to win the Best Independent Film Award at The Best Independents International Filmfestival (BIIF) in Karlsruhe, Germany, and received the Lester James Peries Special Jury Award for Debut Film at the 34th Sarasaviya Film Festival 2018. At the 8th SAARC Film Festival, it earned the Special Jury Award for Best Direction, with the jury praising its daring critique of Sri Lankan values through humour and accuracy. The film also won Best Film in the Cinema of Tomorrow 2017 category at the Derana Film Awards, and was screened at the 26th Love is Folly International Film Festival in Bulgaria.

=== Short films ===
Year	Title	Credited as			Notes
Year	Title	Directors	Screenwriters	Producers	Notes
1998	Anxiety (short film)	Yes	Yes	National Youth Services Council	
2002	Penetrate (short film)	Yes	Yes	University of Colombo	
2003	Exchange (short film)	Yes	Yes	University of Colombo	
2004	Life Circle (short film)	Yes	Yes	University of Colombo	
2006	Transference (short film)	Yes	Yes	University of Colombo	
2007	Today (short film)	Yes	Yes	Akademie Schloss Solitude	
2008	Malte (short film)	Yes	Yes	Akademie Schloss Solitude	

== Radio Play experience ==
Since his school days, he has been a prolific writer of radio plays, many of which he submitted to the Sri Lanka Broadcasting Corporation (SLBC). In 1995, he passed SLBC’s audition and earned recognition as a qualified radio play performing artist. His creative output has yielded several published collections, including "Off with the Head (Uge Hisa Ivarai, 2005)", "May You Attain Comforts of Worldly Life in Japan (Nihon Sapa Labewa, 2012)", and "Balance Bareke Busheka Burul (Wobbly Bush in the Balance Bar, 2023)". A landmark moment came in 2016 with the release of Kanata Parak (Earful of Visuals), a dual audio CD anthology of 14 radio plays that marked a radical aesthetic shift in Sri Lankan radio drama, redefining the sonic and narrative possibilities of the medium after nearly 90 years. Earful of Visuals has vocally contributed nearly 80 prominent Sinhala and Tamil artists. Featuring the vocal talents of Sinhala and Tamil artists, the project stands as a testament to collaborative artistry. It was funded by Artlink of FLICT (Facilitating Initiatives for Social Cohesion & Transformation), also known as GIZ, and presented by Contemporary Art Commune, amplifying its social resonance and cultural impact.

Volume 1

- I.Bashmanthara (between two mind) Sinhalese
- II.Nihon Sepalebewa (May you attain comforts of worldly life in Japan) Sinhalese
- III.Rangadena Kapuwo (Trickster Matchmakers) Sinhalese
- IV.Alayaka Damanaya (Love Tamed) Sinhalese
- V.Nawanalu Dahama (tele drama worlds order) Sinhalese
- VII.Ore idaththil soolaludhal (stagnation) Tamil

Volume 2,

- VIII.Tharuwan Saranai (blessed by Star) Sinhalese
- IX.Ekathena Kerakuma (stagnation) Sinhalese
- X.Suwadena Agni (soothing fire) Sinhalese
- XI.Nirabhishekana (fake felicitations) Sinhalese
- XII.Roma roopana (life in times of rome) Sinhalese
- XIV.Kalyana tharagargal (trickster matchmakers) Tamil

Malaka Dewapriya’s pioneering contributions to Sri Lankan radio drama were formally recognized at the inaugural State Radio Awards Festival, held at the Nelum Pokuna Theater on 13 February 2017. Organized by the Ministry of Internal Affairs, North-Western Development and Cultural Affairs, in collaboration with the Department of Cultural Affairs and the State Advisory Board for Radio, the event marked a historic moment in the institutional acknowledgment of radio as a serious artistic medium. Dewapriya was honored with the Best Radio Drama Writer Award, affirming his role in revitalizing the genre through experimental form and socio-political critique.

Two years later, at the Second State Radio Awards Festival on 12 February 2019, Dewapriya was once again celebrated—this time as Best Radio Drama Scriptwriter. The festival also recognized veteran performers Iranganie Serasinghe and Ramya Wanigasekara with special jury awards for their compelling performances in Dewapriya’s radio plays, underscoring the collaborative strength and aesthetic depth of his productions

=== State Radio Awards ===
Year	Nominee / work	Award	Result
2017	Rangadena Kapuwo (Trickster Matchmakers)	Best Radio Play writer	Won
2019	Indrajalika Magul Senakeli (Magical festival)	Best Radio Play writer	Won

=== Radio Play Controversy ===
Dewapriya was interrogated by the Police Organized Crimes Prevention Division (OCPD) for approximately four hours on October 17, 2019, for the second time, following a complaint about his radio dramas broadcast by ITN FM in 2018. . The complaint had been lodged by a group of monks from the Buddhist Information Centre, led by Angulugalle Siri Jinananda monk. They alleged that the titles of Dewapriya’s dramas were blasphemous distortions of Buddhist terminology. It appears that the content of these dramas sparked controversy and led to criminal proceedings against him, with a filed case number B/98930/01/18 under relevant Sections 291A and Section 291B of the Penal Code and the International Covenant on Civil and Political Rights Act (ICCPR Act) No. 56 of 2007. The phrases “Tharuwan Saranai” and “Nihon Sapa Labewa,” a playful twist on commonly used phrases, were deemed offensive by those who interpreted them. However, the content of the radio dramas was far from religious. For instance, “Tharuwan Saranai” explored the public's obsession with superstars and reality shows, while “Nihon Sapa Labewa” satirized the consistent attempts of Sri Lankan youth to emigrate to Japan in search of greener pastures. In response, Dewapriya filed a human rights petition under case number SC(F/R)No349/18 in the Supreme Court, claiming infringement of his fundamental rights (FR). This case was taken up in 2019 before a three-bench comprising their Lordships Justices S. Thureraja, E.A. G. R Amarasekara, and presided over by Chief Justice Jayantha Jayasuriya. However, the court refused to grant Leave to Proceed on 30 October 2019. Malaka Dewapriya’s creative work stirred controversy, leading to legal scrutiny. The International PEN organization and other social movements protested against the infringement on fundamental religious autonomy. Dewapriya’s commitment to defending his rights remains steadfast as he navigates the complexities of artistic expression and legal challenges in Sri Lanka.

== Theatre ==
He began his journey in stage drama as a child actor in 1989, marking the beginning of a vibrant and award-winning career in Sri Lanka’s theatrical landscape. Early on, he collaborated with several emerging dramatists and contributed as a performer in critically acclaimed productions staged at both the National Youth Drama Festival and the State Drama Festival. His acting credits include The Plague (Mahamariya) by Upali Gamlath (1991), Shadows and Men (Sevaneli saha Minissu) by Prasanna Jayakody (1992), Kaspa by Markwart Müller-Elmau (1993), and Trojan of Women (Ghathakaswara) by Aravinda Hettiaachichi (1994), each reflecting distinctive aesthetic and thematic concerns of the time. In addition to acting, he played an integral role backstage, serving as a stage manager for productions led by dynamic young dramatists such as Dhananjaya Karunaratna and Piyal Kariyawasam, further sharpening his understanding of theatrical craft and collaborative process.

His passion for theatre extended into his student years, during which he wrote and produced several short plays. These works earned recognition at school, inter-school, and all-island competitions, where he was honored as a best writer, director, and actor—affirming his multifaceted talent and creative promise.

In 2001, he directed his debut full-length play, Harold Pinter’s One for the RoadOne for the Road, staged at King George Hall, Colombo, Colombo as a University of Colombo production. The play was selected for performance at both the Youth and State Drama Festivals, where it received multiple awards—solidifying his transition from emerging artist to accomplished theatrical director.

Director; translator (from English into Sinhalese)

- 2003 The New World Order (dramatic sketch by Harold Pinter)

- 2001 One for the Road (play by Harold Pinter)

Director; (Original in Sinhalese)

- 2017 Kora Saha Andaya / written by (Dharmasena Pathiraja, First Directed by Dhamma Jagoda in 1970)
- 1995 Punish – (short play)
- 1993 Bandana – (short play)

- 1992 Volcano – (short play)
- 1991 Forgiveness – (short children's play)

== Exhibitions ==
- 2016 Cinnamon Colomboscope Colombo, Sri Lanka( 25 August to 1 September 2016)
- 2014 Colombo Art Biennale Colombo, Sri Lanka(31 January 2013 to 9 February 2013)
- 2012 Colombo Art Biennale Colombo, Sri Lanka(15 to 15 February)
- 2011 4to Internacional Festival of Video Art, Camagüey 2011 Camagüey, Cuba (25 November 29 )
- 2011 "Videoholica" – 4th International Video Art Festival, Varna Puppet Theatre BLOCK RE-A Varna, Bulgaria (7 August )
- 2010 "Earseyes" – Tokyo wonder site, Tokyo, Japan (25th'Sat' December)
- 2010 "Urban Civilization and Humanity" – Yeosu International Art Festival, Jinnam Art and Culture Center Yeosu, South Korea (1–10, October)
- 2010 "Short video of Modern Musical Performance" – "Ears and Eyes" at KNUA Hall, Seoul, South Korea (9 August )
- 2010 "Experimental Sound, Art & Performance Festival-Osaka" at The Phoenix Hall, Osaka, Japan (4 August )
- 2010 "Earth"–Supernatural / Video Art Festival Miden in Kalamata's Historic Centre, Kalamata, Greece (8–10, July)
- 2010 "Silent art films xx contemporary music":Experimental Sound, Art & Performance Festival, 2009 –Video, at Tokyo wonder site, Tokyo, Japan (27th'Sat' February )
- 2009 "Ok" Video Comedy, 4th Jakarta International Video Festival, Jakarta, Indonesia (28 July – 9 August 2009)
- 2009 "Open Studio5" (part1) – Video installation (Group show with National and international Artist, National Goyang Art studio), Seoul, South Korea (24 – 26 April)
- 2009 "Hi Asia":Contemporary art Exhibition –Video installation (Volition)at Sungsan Art Hall, Changwon, South Korea(17 April-5 May)
- 2009 "Rhythmic flow "– Video installation at Art Center Nabi, Seoul, South Korea (1 – 30 April )
- 2009 "Mind Street "– Video installation (Group Exhibition at EM art Gallery), Seoul, South Korea (13 – 20 March )
- 2008 "She Fits" (aka "SheFits" and "Shifits") – Video installation in Group Show: Fetish and Consumption (29 May – 5 July)at Akademie Schloss Solitude, Solitude 3, Stuttgart, Germany; participant in Long Night of the Museums (5 April), at Akademie Schloss Solitude, Römerstrasse 2, Stuttgart, Germany.
- 2007 "Silence through Colours, Shapes and Darkness" in My Oasis of Silence – Photography and video, at Goethe-Institut, Colombo, Sri Lanka
- 2006 "Human, Texture and Pattern" in Imagine Tropics – Photography, at Goethe-Institut, Colombo, Sri Lanka
- 2005 "Life" – Photography, at Lionel Wendt Memorial Art Centre gallery, Colombo, Sri Lanka
- 2003 "Chayavalokana" – Photography, at University of Colombo, Colombo, Sri Lanka

== Academic and Professional Engagements ==
Malaka Dewapriya has been actively engaged in academic and professional initiatives related to audio-visual education in Sri Lanka since 2000. He has served as an external lecturer for the NISCO Video Course at the National Youth Services Council, where he specialized in video production techniques and media ethics. Since 2005, he has contributed to the Research and Training Division of the Sri Lanka Broadcasting Corporation as a resource person, supporting media education and professional development initiatives.

Beginning in 2010, he has collaborated with the Sri Lanka Rupavahini Training Institute, offering his expertise in film and video production. Between 2014 and 2025, he periodically lectured on Short Film Production at the Department of Drama and Dance Studies, University of the Visual and Performing Arts. In 2019, he commenced his involvement in audio-visual education workshops for schoolteachers, organized by the National Institute of Education.

In addition to these long-term engagements, Dewapriya has conducted in numerous short-term workshops and guest lectures at leading universities and institutes —including the University of Colombo, Sripali Campus, University of Kelaniya, University of Moratuwa, University of Rajarata, and University of Peradeniya, Tower hall foundation, National Film corporation—advocating for the integration of audio-visual media into higher education curricula.

== Publications ==
- Dewapriya, Malaka. Bahuchithawadiya (The Undideded). Screen play. Surasa published, Colombo 10 :2025. ISBN 978-624-204-248-0. (published in Sinhalese).
- Dewapriya, Malaka (2023). 'Balance Bareke Busheka Burul' (wobbly bush in the balance bar). Radio Drama Collection. VAPA University Press, Colombo 7 :2023. ISBN 978-624-5785-16-2.( published in Sinhalese)
- Dewapriya, Malaka. "Sri Lankan Experience of the Short Film". Artslant Magazine (First 2009). artslant. artslant.com. World Wide Web. Retrieved on 2009-01-18.
- Dewapriya, Malaka (2012). 'Nihon Sepa Lebewa' (May you attain comforts of worldly life in Japan). Radio Drama Collection. Kolamba:2012. ISBN 978-955-98140-2-3.(Author publication in Sinhalese)
- Dewapriya, Malaka. Magical Festival: A Radio Drama. Colección nueva narrativa y poesía sudaca border año 2007. Buenos Aires: Eloísa Cartonera, 2007. OCLC 233002160. (Corrugated board bindings.)
- Dewapriya, Malaka (2006). Uge Hisa Ivarai (Off with His Head). Radio Drama Collection. Kolamba: Mālaka Dēvapriya [sic], 2006. ISBN 978-955-99772-0-9. (Author publication in Sinhalese).
