= Weda Beri Tarzan =

2007 Sri Lankan comedy film

Wada Bari Tarzan වැඩ බැරි ටාසන්
- Directed by: Sudesh Wasantha Peiris; Sunil Soma Peiris
- Written by: Sunil Soma Peiris
- Based on: Sunil Soma Peiris
- Produced by: Sunil T. Films
- Starring: Tennyson Cooray; Jeevan Kumaratunga; Piyumi Purasinghe
- Cinematography: Lalith M. Thomas
- Edited by: Anusha Jayawardena
- Music by: Keshan Perera
- Production company: Dil Films
- Release date: 27 April 2007
- Country: Sri Lanka
- Language: Sinhala

Wada Bari Tarzan (Sinhala: වැඩ බැරි ටාසන්) is a 2007 Sri Lankan Sinhala comedy film co-directed by Sudesh Wasantha Peiris and Sunil Soma Peiris and produced by Sunil T. Fernando for Sunil T. Films. It stars Tennyson Cooray, Jeevan Kumaratunga, Rex Kodippili, and Piyumi Purasinghe in lead roles along with Premadasa Vithanage, Chathura Perera and Jeevan Handunnetti. Music Composed by Keshan Perera. It is the 1085th Sri Lankan film in the Sinhala cinema. This film has brought debut cinema acting for Piyumi Purasinghe. It is inspired by Tarzan by Edgar Rice Burroughs

== Cast ==
- Tennyson Cooray as Tarzan
- Piyumi Purasinghe as Maheshi
- Jeevan Kumaratunga as Professor Devaka
- Rex Kodippili as Treasure hunter
- Premadasa Vithanage as Gurunnanse 'Guruji'
- Chathura Perera as Perera
- Susila Kottage as Nimbula
- Jeevan Handunnetti as Nanna
- Sunil Hettiarachchi as Silva
- Manjula Thilini as Anjali
- Buddhika Rambukwella
- Ariyasena Gamage
- Dayaratne Siriwardena as Kiri Honda
- Rizwan Fa as Devaka's ally

== Sequel ==
The directors made the sequel Wada Bari Tarzan Mathisabayata in 2008.
