= Rush (2019 film) =

2019 Sri Lankan film

- Story of Love
- රෂ්
- Directed by: Mahesh Munasinghe
- Written by: Kelum Kularatne / Amila Thenuwara
- Produced by: Wasantha Wijendra & Rum Motion Pictures
- Starring: Uddika Premarathna; Saranga Disasekara; Iresha Asanki De Silva
- Cinematography: Rangana S. Bandara
- Edited by: Roshan Edward
- Music by: Eranga Jayawardhana
- Distributed by: EAP Movies
- Release date: 15 October 2019
- Country: Sri Lanka
- Language: Sinhala

Rush (Sinhala: රෂ්) is a 2019 Sri Lankan Sinhala action thriller romance film directed by Mahesh Munasinghe as his debut cinema direction and produced by Wasantha Wijendra & Rum Motion Pictures. It stars Uddika Premarathna, Saranga Disasekara and debut actress Iresha Asanki De Silva in lead roles along with Lucky Dias and Sanath Gunathilake in supportive roles. Music composed by Eranga Jayawardena and lyrics by Nilar N. Cassim and Kelum Srimal.

Song release and press conference of the film was held at Savoy Premiere Wellawatta. It is the official sinhala remake of 1998 Tamil film Priyamudan. In 2021, the film won the award for the Most Popular Film at SLIM-Nielsen Peoples Awards.

== Plot ==
Rashan Wijemanna who nicknamed "Rush" is a son of a wealthy businessman named Sunil Wijemanna. He grows up with a possessive attitude, and is almost considered as a psychopath by the audience. Rush goes to trip to Kandy with his best friend Rashantha and other friends. They stay at a hotel. One Day, Rashan went to a gift shop, where he breaks a gift which he likes solely as it had already been brought by someone else. He pays the owner to cover the damages but responds with a negative tagline - "If I can't get it, nobody can". On that night, He meets a young girl named Pooja in same hotel and it is love at first sight for Rashan. Pooja is injured in an accident and Rashan's best friend Rashantha Saparamadu who nicknamed "Shan" rescues her by donating blood which witnessed by Pooja's father, Prof. Madugalle. Being unconscious, Pooja does not know the face of her savior, only the name "Rashantha Saparamadu".

After she recovers, Pooja comes to Colombo to meet Rashantha Saparamadu and stays in her uncle's house. However, Rush who needs her at any cost, pretends to be Rashantha Saparamadu and makes advantage of her soft corner. He also manages to hide her from actual Rashantha. One day, Pooja and Rush go to theater to watch a movie, but he unknowingly learns that Pooja and Shan already know each other during their music project. He is angered and breaks the ice creams brought for them.

One day, Shan learns of Pooja's and Rush's affair and greets them. Pooja's father Prof. Madugalla also learns about the affair and gets happy thinking she is in love with one who saved her. Rush invites Madugalla to meet at hotel. While Pooja is away from the home for a small work, Rush meets Madugalla and admits the truth to him, shocking Madugalla. Madugalla gets a heart attack and dies in front of Rush. CID officer Radeesh begin to investigate the case with police.

One day, Shan comes to Kandy finishing music audition, which he had missed when he donated blood to Pooja. Rush arranges gest room for him but fears that he might find the truth. He goes to the hospital where Pooja was admitted and tears the certificate of admission. Shan sees this, and they go to a nearby hill station. Shan starts arguing with Rush for cheating his name. Rush apologizes and admits the truth, but Shan continues argument. He beats Rush but Shan falls from a high cliff. Having no way, Rush sacrifices his life for his friend's sake. Shocked by this incident, Rush decides to transform himself into a good gentleman and thereby leaves his behavior as that of a psychopath. Rush then sincerely starts to take care of Pooja who misses her father now.

Meanwhile, CID Radeesh come to know that the real murderer of Prof. Madugalle and Shan is Rush. Pooja also becomes aware of this while she was in jungle with Rush. Pooja gets scared and runs to jungle. Rush searches for her and is finally beaten by Pooja for killing her father. However, the police shoots Rush, and he gets unconsicinous, unable to bear the pain. Pooja bursts in tears. However, Rush admits to hospital and CID Radeesh learns that Prof. Madugalle had died from a heartattack and Rush is innocent. Shan who stays in same hospital, forgives Rush to his every mistakes. Radeesh and police apologizes from Rush while Rush's father also in there. The film ends with Rush and Pooja's wedding.

== Cast ==
- Uddika Premarathna as Rashan Wijemanna aka 'Rush'
  - Viraj Madhushan as Young Rashan Wijemanna
- Iresha Asanki de Silva as Pooja Madugalle
- Saranga Disasekara as Rashantha Saparamadu aka 'Shan'
- Isuru Lokuhettiarachchi as CID Radeesh Imbulgoda
- Lucky Dias as Sunil Wijemanne, Rashan's father
- Sanath Gunathilake as Prof. Madugalle
- Harsha Thennakoon as Chani
- Janith Wickramage as Diliya
- Janith Iroshan as Bunny
- Austin Samarawickrama as Mr. Saparamadu, Rashantha's father
- Anula Karunathilaka as Mrs. Saparamadu, Rashantha's mother
- Ruvi Lakmali as Rashantha's sister
- Ajith Weerasinghe as Ranil Madugalle
- Prema Pathiraja as Sujtha
- Sujeewa Dias as Mrs. Madugalle
- Yureni Noshika as Christina
- Tekla Kumari as Sheril
- Shashi Angelina as Christina's friend
- Srimali Mallika as Janaki Wijemanna, Rashan's adopted mother
- Mike Fernando as Police OIC

== Soundtrack ==
The film consists with four songs.

No.	Title	Lyrics	Singer(s)	Length
1.	"Wasanthayai"	Kelum Srimal	Eranga Jayawardhana	04:04
2.	"Aatha Paawela"	Nilar N. Cassim	Eranga Jayawardhana, Ashwini Danthanarayana	04:50
3.	"Sihilasee"	Nilar N. Cassim	Eranga Jayawardhana, Hansini Koralage	04:14
4.	"Lasowin"	Nilar N. Cassim	Eranga Jayawardhana, Gayani Kaushalya	04:44
Total length:				17:52
