= Royal Institute International School =

International school in Sri Lanka

Royal Institute International Schools
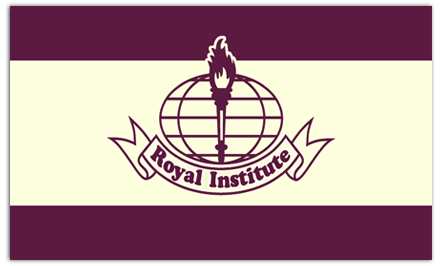

Location
- Havelock Town, Nugegoda, Maharagama, Maya Avenue, Gampaha; Sri Lanka

Information
- Motto: The light of learning
- Established: 1971
- Founder: G. T. Bandara
- Grades: Nursery to Grade 12 (Cambridge A-Levels and National A-Levels)
- Color(s): Dark brown and cream
- Website: www.royalinstitute.org

Royal Institute International School is a private school in Sri Lanka, providing primary and secondary education.

In addition to the Royal Institute main school in Havelock Town, Colombo, there are branch schools in Nugegoda, Maharagama, and Gampaha which provide co-educational education. There is a girls' school on Maya Avenue, Colombo 6.

== History ==
Royal Institute International School was founded in 1971 by G.T. Bandara. In 1982, it was registered as a private limited liability company teaching O-Level and A-level courses. Following negotiations, in 1991 the Institute began preparing students to receive degrees from the University of London to provide continuity of education up to tertiary level.

== Branches ==
The main campus is at No. 191, Havelock Road, Colombo 05. A branch school was set up in Nugegoda in 1993 to provide primary education, and has since been upgraded to an international school. In 2005, another branch was established in Maharagama, followed by a girls' school in Colombo 6 in 2008. In 2013, another branch was opened in Gampaha.

== Notable alumni ==
- Shanudrie Priyasad, actress
