= Narada Disasekara =

Sri Lankan classical singer

Narada Disasekara නාරද දිසාසේකර
- Born: Narada Leelanaga Caldera Disasekara; 7 June 1933; British Ceylon
- Died: 19 May 2010 (aged 76); Sri Lanka
- Education: Kalutara Vidyalaya
- Known for: Sinhala music
- Spouse(s): Tileka Ranasinghe (1979-1988); Nilangani Disasekara
- Children: Saranga Disasekara

Narada Leelanaga Caldera Disasekara, popularly known as Narada Disasekara (7 June 1933 – 19 May 2010) was a Sri Lankan classical singer. He was the first singer to win the Sarasaviya Award when he was awarded for Best Male Playback Singing in 1964 for his duet Galana Gangaki Jeevithe with a young Nanda Malini for Ranmuthu Duwa.

== Personal life ==
He completed education from St. Thomas' College, Kotte and Kalutara Vidyalaya. Narada's sister's son is Nalendra Amarasinghe and his wife is Girlie. Narada was good at sports like cricket during school times. He also studied music and played violin under the school teacher Seemon Lokuliyana.

Disasekara was first married to radio host and actress Tileka Ranasinghe in 1979. The couple has one son, Saranga. Saranga Disasekara became a popular actor since his debut in Nil Diya Yahana in 2009. He then acted in many films and television serials and won most popular actor award in multiple times. After separating from Tileka, he was married to Nilangani Disasekara.

Disasekara died on 19 May 2010 at the age of 76. The remains were kept at his residence at 26A, Wetakehiyawala Road, Udahamulla, Nugegoda for public on 20 May 2010. His remains were later buried in Borella Cemetery.

== Career ==
Disasekera had started as a mechanic of the Engineering section of Radio Ceylon in 1954. Later in 1955, he became a popular singer of the Radio Ceylon and sang the songs – Chandana Enga Gala, Eya Pamanai Mage Mihirata, Mulu Hadin Mama Obata Pemkara for Radio Ceylon.

His solo songs such as Galana Gangaki Jeewithe, Pipee, Pipee Renu Natana, Gamana Nonimei Lokaye and Aarichchi Borichchi were recorded as playback songs for films. He has also provided background songs for the films Hathara Kendaraya, Senasuma Kothenada, Adarayai Karunawai, and Manamalayho. In addition to the Sarasaviya Award, he received the Honorary Award from the Universities of Colombo and Moratuwa and the Art Decoration Award in 1999.

On 28 August 2012, Narada Disasekara Appreciation Ceremony was held at the Battaramulla Folk Art Center at 5.30 p.m.
