= Priya Suriyasena =

Sri Lankan singer (1944–2024)

Priya Suriyasena ප්‍රියා සූරියසේන
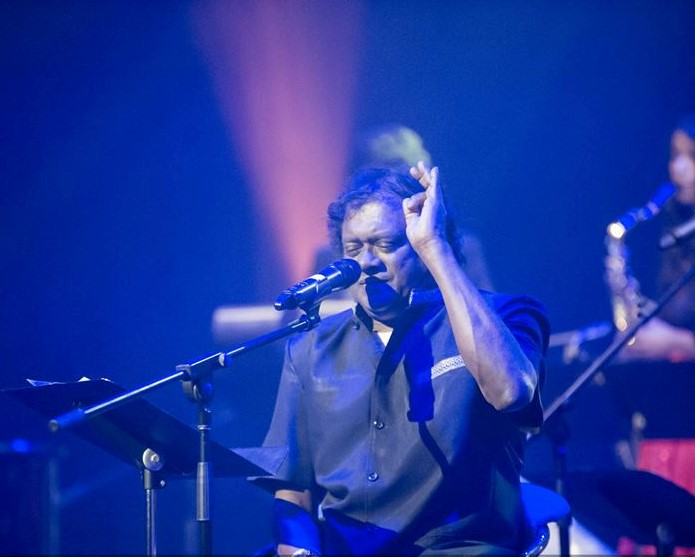
- Priya performing in Melbourne, Australia in 2017
- Born: Madawala Liyanage Don Sarathchandra Priyadarshi Suriyasena Liyanage; 27 October 1944; Nattandiya, British Ceylon
- Died: 24 December 2024 (aged 80); Colombo, Sri Lanka
- Education: Nattandiya Primary School; Madampe Central College
- Occupations: Singer, music director, lecturer, composer
- Spouse: Thamara Kumari Weerasinghe
- Children: Minoshi Suriyasena, Iroshi Suriyasena, Luckshitha Suriyasena, Gayashi Suriyasena
- Parents: Madawala Liyanage Jamis Appuhami (father); Podi Manike (mother)
- Musical career
- Genres: Pop; soul; rhythm and blues; Indian classical music
- Instrument: Vocals
- Years active: 1972–2021
- Labels: Gemtone; Nilwala; Tharanga; Ransilu

Madawala Liyanage Don Sarathchandra Priyadarshi Suriyasena Liyanage (Sinhala: ප්‍රියා සූරියසේන: 27 October 1944 – 24 December 2024), popularly known as Priya Suriyasena, was a Sri Lankan singer. Suriyasena first emerged as a singer with the guidance of his father, who was a poet, and then rose to fame overnight when his first four songs were broadcast at the Sri Lanka Broadcasting Corporation (SLBC) in the 1970s. From then on, he retained his fame over five decades and produced popular songs in Sri Lanka such as "Atha Ranviman", "Mata Wasana", "Adaraneeya Neranjana", "Ratakin Eha" and "Sudu Paravi Rena".

== Personal life ==
Priya Suriyasena was born on 27 October 1944 to an up-country middle-class family in Nattandiya, Puttalam District. His father Jamis Appuhami was a poet, from whom he got his musical talents. His mother was A. M. Podi Manike. He was the only son in a family of four. He had his primary education at Nattandiya Primary School and completed his GCE O/L and A/L at Madampe Central College in Puttalam District. His singing ability was further developed by two teacher D. V. L. Mahipala and B. Veedagama of the school.

In 1978, he married Thamara Kumari Weerasinghe who was a music teacher. The couple had one son and three daughters. His son Luckshitha studied at Ananda College and learned music from Lionel Ranwala. Luckshitha pursued his PhD at Stanford University and is a scientist by profession. He is also a talented singer and performs on live TV to continue his father's legacy. Eldest daughter Minoshi is a doctor. The second daughter, Iroshi, is also active in the Sri Lankan music industry and is a senior manager at a private bank.

== Career ==
Suriyasena sat for external music exams conducted by the government musical college 'Heywood' from 1968 to 1971 and obtained a diploma in music. Suriyasena won several prizes as a student after participating in musical programs, such as the island-wide UNESCO talent competition in which he won the first prize. Suriyasena continued his career as a music teacher at Kelaniya Gurukula College in 1971 while also being a stage singer. Then he moved to Kalubowila Vidyalaya and finally to Dehiwala Central College. After about 10 years of service in Dehiwala, Suriyasena left his teaching career, prioritising his music career.

Suriyasena recorded some of his original songs in SLBC in 1972 and also passed as an A-grade radio singer. At this stage he shortened his name from Priyadharshi to "Priya", inspired by Sri Lankan motor racing legend Priya Munasinghe. His first cassette tape was released under Vijaya Ramanayake's Tharanga label, which was also the second cassette produced in Sri Lanka. His first song "Andura Andura Mage" was recorded in 1968. Lal Thenabadu, the late Sarath Dassanayake, Stanley Peiris, Sarath de Alwis, late Clarence Wijewardena, Ranjith Perera and many other veteran music directors have composed his songs. Suriyasena was also a talented composer and directed music for his own songs such as "Adaraneeya Neranjana", "Heta Dawase", "Mata Wasana", "Sanda Ma Gawai", "Mage Samarum Pothe", "Ekama Vidiye", and "Gelawata Banda Wu" among others. Most of these songs were created by Suriyasena and Premakeerthi De Alwis who were close friends in the 1970s and became instant hits popular to date. He has also composed songs for other artists such as H. R. Jothipala, Milton Mallawarachchi, Mervin Perera, Anton Senanayake and famous Christian Baila music hit dedicated to St Anthony sung by Anton Jones. Suriyasena sung famous duets with Victor Rathnayake, Latha Walpola, Chandralekha Perera, Malkanthi Nandasiri and others.

After the release of his first four songs in the SLBC, Suriyasena reached the peak of popularity and became the heartthrob of youngsters in the 1970s. His first four songs: "Sarathasa Niwa", "Mata Wasana", "Heta Dawase" and "Andura Andura Mage" were recorded for the SLBC in 1972. The release of "Sudu Parevi Rena Se" brought Suriyasena up to one of the top singers in the 1980s bringing a controversy at the time when the Sri Lankan government prohibited broadcasting the song through radio channels for a while. His popularity was raised with the Sarasaviya Award for "Kendan Yannam", a song from Sena Samarasinghe's 1984 film Aethin Aethata with Milton Mallawarachchi and Gratien Ananda.

He was also a playback singer in many films including Mal Kekulu in the early 1980s, the song "Bindu Bindu Kandulu Sala", a duet with Shayami Fonseka and music directed by Sarath Dassanayake and produced by Sena Samarasinghe. Further, he sang in many other films like Selinage Walawwa, Mudukkuwe Juliet, Hariyanakota Ohama Thamai, and Pina Paduna Da. In the film Ethin Ethata, he sang the duet "Kandan Yannan Ranmal Mala Dala" with Milton Mallawarachchi to the music direction of Sarath Dassanayake which won a Sarasaviya Award in the 1980s. In the film Suhada Sohoyuro he played a minor role. However, later Suriyasena gave up singing as a playback singer focusing only on stage. In 2006, he sang a duet "Gimhanaye" with Samitha Mudunkotuwa for the film Kalu Sudu Mal as the male playback for Kamal Addararachchi.

At the beginning of the 1990s, Suriyasena leaned towards the cassette production business where he started "Luckshitha Trade Centre" and released cassettes of M. S. Fernando, Punsiri Soysa, H. R. Jothipala and Champa Kalhari. In 1996, Suriyasena brought a new musical generation to the country with the album "Sunflowers with Priya" which grossed revenue of over Rs. 8 million and became the most sought after singer in the country again in the 1990s. The trend with Sunflowers continued for decades after the first release. In 2006, he again rose to fame as Ajith Bandara, the winner of the first reality superstar competition in Sri Lanka called Sirasa Superstar sang his songs in the competition that later led to controversy, which later resolved.

Suriyasena travelled overseas to countries with significant Sri Lankan communities for musical performances. His maiden foreign tour was to Singapore in 1978 with Nanda Malini, Sanath Nandasiri and Malkanthi Nandasiri. Subsequently, he made it to over 44 other countries including the United States, Canada, Europe, Asia, the Middle East, Japan and Australia. In 2012, he released the album "Malsara Hinawa" which included several old hits.

== Death ==
Suriyasena died while undergoing treatment at the Colombo National Hospital, on 24 December 2024, at the age of 80. His remains were cremated in Kanatte Cemetery.
