= Stanley Peiris =

- Born: Weerasinghe Arachchilage Edward Stanley Peiris; 12 June 1941; Kandy, Sri Lanka
- Died: 13 October 2002 (aged 61)
- Genres: Sri Lankan music
- Occupations: Saxophonist, composer, teacher
- Instrument: Saxophone

Stanley Peiris (12 June 1941 – 13 October 2002) was a Sri Lankan musician and musical composer.

== Early life ==
Stanley Peiris was born in Kandy on 12 June 1941 and attended St. Anthony's College, Kandy. He learnt music at the Kandy M.G.C. institute and later joined the Sri Lanka Navy. He then formed a music group, Fortunes, which specialised in performing instrumental music, an innovative idea in the Sinhala pop scene.

== Music ==
His musical career spanned more than forty years and he produced over 700 albums and composed scores for about 6,600 songs. Some of his popular melodies include; Lata Walpola's "Punsanda Eliyai", Milton Mallawarachchi's "Amaran Hengum", Clarence Wijewardena's "Duwa Ma Wage", Gration Amanda's "Tharu Yaye" and Nirosha Virajini's "Sigiri Geeyak Obe Hadawathe".

In 1981 he composed music for the film Saranga and then for films including Soora Saradiel and Baisikalaya. Peiris was teaching at St. Anthony's College, Kandy, where Rookantha Gunathilake was one of his students. Peiris then formed Galaxy, with Gunathilake, Mahinda Bandara and Keerthi Pasqual. Peiris helped composer Dinesh Subasinghe at the beginning of his music career in 2000. He has also collaborated with Pandit W. D. Amaradeva.

== Selected compositions ==
- Sithin ma nosalee, Kurahan yaye, Chandikamata Randuwak - T. M. Jayaratne
- Hanga Gal Leney - H. R. Jothipala
- Igillila yanna yan, Re tharakawo, Ranabima marune - Chandrika Siriwardena
- Ganu Lamainey, Mal pokuru pokuru - Victor Rathnayake
- Kurutu ge gee pothe, Jesu swami daruwane, Peedena goyame - Nanda Malini
- Peda Pasi Soyala - Abeywardena Balasuriya
- Hada pathule, Athithaye pawa, Ama Ran Hagum, Weedi Kone, Dawasak Thiyewi - Milton Mallawarachchi
- Asurin mideela, Mage Lamada, Jeewithe mage oyakiyala, Hadawatha illa, Sanda tharaka - Priya Suriyasena
- Hathara watin kalu karagena - Sujatha Aththanayaka
- Hawasata paya, Tharu yaye - Gratien Ananda
- Rantharu payana, Sinhala raja kale - Keerthi Pasquel
- Suba gamanak wewa, Duwa daruwo, Me kathawa manmulawa - Chandralekha Perera
- Kedinada kudu hadhanata, Manamaliya Wee - Niranjala Sarojini
- Sili sili seethala alle, Mudu palanda - Raj Senivirathna
- Sandaleka, Sura geeyai bilindu handai - Rookantha Gunathilake
- Duwa maa wage - Clarence Wijewardena
- Dedhune pata patin, Mama nam asai Ahanna nayana, Dangakara oya dasa, Awilunu Gini Dal - Sanath Nandasiri
- Tharu arundahthi - W. D. Amaradeva
- Seegiri geeyak, Ranchagoda - Nirosha Virajini
- Nethin netha balala - Rohana Bogoda
- Landune sonduru landune, Mage Meenachi - Raju Bandara
- Ahase polowe sagare, Sudu rosai muhuna - Jayantha Disanayaka
- Oba Malak wage hinaheela, pera kale - Athula Adhikari
- Mama yanam - Nelu Adhikari
- Suwadathi Kusumaka Susinidu Pethi Matha - Neela Wickramasinghe & Mervin Perera

== Death ==
Peiris died from cancer on 13 October 2002, at his residence in Kandy.
