= Kalana Gunasekara =

Kalana Gunasekara කලණ ගුණසේකර
- Born: Kaluarachchige Kalana Jayanath Gunasekara; March 5, 1982 (age 44); Kahathuduwa, Piliyandala, Sri Lanka
- Education: Piliyandala Central College
- Occupations: Actor; director; playwright; scriptwriter
- Years active: 2002–present
- Known for: Koombiyo; Gini Avi Saha Gini Keli TV Series; Podu
- Spouses: Gayathri Heenatigala (Divorced); Ruchini Wijesundara (m.2026)

Kaluarachchige Kalana Jayanath Gunasekara, popularly known as Kalana Gunasekara (කළණ ගුණසේකර) is a Sri Lankan actor, director and screen writer in cinema, theater and television. He played Priyantha Mahaulpathagama in the TV series Koombiyo Independent Television Network and Kotiyagoda Sunil (Sunna) in the series Gini Awi Saha Gini Keli TV on TV Derana.

== Early life ==
Gunasekara developed an interest in the performing arts during his school years. He pursued formal training in drama and theatre, actively participating in youth theatre workshops and island-wide drama competitions before transitioning into professional stage and screen productions.

== Personal life ==
Kalana was married to journalist and producer Gayathri Heenatigala. In 2026, Kalana married Ruchini Wijesundara.

== Political career ==
Kalana played a key role in the 2022 People's Struggle. He also joined the political platform of the National People's Power in 2024. This was for the victory of the party's presidential candidate Anura Kumara Dissanayake in the 2024 presidential election. He also spoke at the rally held in Maradankadawala, Anuradhapura on September 6, 2024 and at the launch ceremony of the party's youth policy held at the Sugathadasa Indoor Stadium on September 8.

== Filmography ==
=== Theater ===
Year	Title	Notes
2003	Man Diyawela	
2006	Dasa Mallige Bangalawa	Produced by Kalana Gunasekara and Malith Pieris
2012	Gladiator Premaya	
2015	Ego Nagaraya	
2022	Mr. President	

=== Films ===
==== As an actor ====
Year Released	Film	Director	Role	Ref.
2016	Motor Bicycle	Shameera Naotunna	Jimma	
2020	Soosthi	Kushan Weeraratne	Malaka	
2020	Suparna	Sujeewa Priyalal	Raveen	
2022	Night Rider	Kasun Pathirana	Milinda	
2022	Piyabanna Ayeth	Shirley Samarasinghe	Nilantha	
2023	Gaadi	Prasanna Vithanage	Village youth	
2023	Vedi Nowadina Lamai	Indika Ferdinando	Piyasiri	
2023	Viyasiduru	Prabath Agampodi	Hirantha	
2023	Rahas Kiyana Kandu	Jagath Manuwarna	—N/a	
2024	Sihina Nelum Mal	Shameera Naotunna	Alvis	
2025	Bahuchithawadiya	Malaka Dewapriya	Sasitha	
2025	Mother Lanka	Anusha Edirimuni	—N/a	
2026	Dharmayuddhaya 2	Aruna Jayawardana	Kelum, Security officer	
2026	Eda Raa	Aruna Jayawardana	Premakeerthi De Alwis	
TBA	Monkey Man	Tharindu Deshapriya	—N/a	
TBA	My Simba	JK	—N/a	
TBA	Room No 106	Suranga de Alwis	—N/a	
TBA	Dura Diga Missila	Ranjith Sinharaja	—N/a	
TBA	Sigiri	Rohan Perera	—N/a	
TBA	Thambapanni	Sajeewa Kanakaratne	—N/a	
TBA	Ikka	Madhawa Pathirana	—N/a	
TBA	Marine Drive	Megha Sooriyarachchi	—N/a	

==== As a script writer ====
Year Released	Film	Director	Role
2020	Soosthi	Kushan Weeraratne	Actor and Script Writer
2025	Ice Cream	Pradeep Dharmadasa	Script Writer
TBA	Ikka	Madhawa Pathirana	Actor and Script Writer
TBA	Monkey Man	Tharindu Deshapriya	Actor and Script Writer
TBA	Thambapanni	Sajeewa Kanakaratne	Actor and Script Writer

=== Television ===
Year	Title	Role
2011	Me Wasantha Kalayai	
2013	Husma Saha Oxygen	
2013	Vibhaga Fail	
2014	One Way	
2014	Gini Awi Saha Gini Keli	Sunna / Kotiyagoda Sunil AKA Sunil Amarasinghe
2015	Swetha Ganthera	
2017	Koombiyo	Priyantha Mahaulpathagama
2017	Bonchi Gedara Indrajala	
2018	Iskole Kaale	
2018	Thrailoka	
2018	Crime Scene	
2019	Ado	
2020	Black Town Story	
2021	Podu 2	Primal
2021	Andungira	
2022	Akshi	
2024	Recondition Kella	
2024	Hyena Land	
2024	Amuthu Dosthara	
2025	Sea Saw	

== Awards and nominations ==
Year	Award	Category	Nominated work	Result
2018	Raigam Tele'es	Best Supporting Actor	Koombiyo	Won
2019	Rupavahini State Awards	Best Supporting Actor	Koombiyo	Won
2019	SIGNIS Sri Lanka Awards	Best Supporting Actor	Koombiyo	Won
2019	Presidential Film Awards	Merit Award	Motor Bicycle	Won
2019	Derana Film Awards	Special Jury Award	Ikka	Won
2020	Sumathi Awards	Best Supporting Actor	Ado	Won
2020	Sarasaviya Film Awards	Most Popular Actor	—	Won
2022	Derana Film Awards	Best Actor	Night Rider	Nominated
2022	SIGNIS Sri Lanka Awards	Best Actor	Night Rider	Nominated
