= Shihan Mihiranga Bennet =

Sri Lankan singer and composer

Shihan Mihiranga ශිහාන් මිහිරංග
- Born: Shihan Mihiranga Bennet; 18 March 1985 (age 41); Colombo, Sri Lanka
- Education: De Mazenod College, Kandana
- Occupations: Vocalist, Songwriter, Composer, Producer, Recording engineer
- Spouse: Geshni Clementa Silva (m. 2012)
- Children: 3
- Musical career
- Genres: Pop; soul; rhythm and blues; jazz; Alternative rock
- Instrument: Vocals
- Years active: 2005–Present
- Label: Dreamz entertainment / M entertainment

Shihan Mihiranga Bennet (Sinhala: ශිහාන් මිහිරංග; born 18 March 1985), is a Sri Lankan musician, composer and songwriter.

== Personal life ==
Bennet was born on 18 March 1985 in Weliweriya. His father, Tyronne Bennet, was a sound engineer who previously worked in Bahrain, and his mother, Nilu Mallika, is a housewife. He has one younger sister, Shanika Mihiravi. Bennet studied at De Mazenod College, Kandana.

Bennet married Gishni Clementa Silva on 25 February 2012. The wedding was held at St. Mary's church in Nayakakanda, Hendala. Clementa is the daughter of Upali Silva, who is a PTI of Bennet's school. The couple has three sons.

Shihan was hospitalized for dengue fever in 2017, but recovered after treatments. However, in the wake of his hospitalization, false rumors circulated alleging that he had died.

== Career ==
In 2006, Bennet competed on the first season of the singing reality show Sirasa Superstar. Mihiranga came in fifth place in the competition despite being the most popular contestant throughout the show. He sang mostly songs by Rookantha Gunathilake, including "Suwanda Dena Mal Waney", "Nihanda Mawathey", "Mama Ehewwa Horen", and "As-Deka Piyana".

Shortly after finishing the competition in 2006, he released his first album, Dreams of Shihan. He composed all of the music and lyrics on the album himself. The album won the Most Popular Album award. In 2008, he released his second album, Dreamz 2 – My Life, which includes lyrics and music composed by other musicians.

Shihan released his first music video, "Ada Thaniyen Maa" which was a great hit in Sri Lanka. Later, it won the most popular music video award at the Derana Music Video Awards in 2007. He is also a playback singer who has lent his voice to many films, including Suwanda Danuna Jeewithe. His songs from that film, "Perada Mewu Sina", "Ron Suwanda Dena", and "Sith Mal Hegum Popiyana Yame" became very popular. He did playback singing on the song "Raya Pibidee" in the movie Super Six.

In Sirasa Superstar season four, which was renamed Generation 4, Bennet hosted the program alongside Nirosha Perera. He also sang the theme song, "Yawwane Sihina Yata Daelwune" for the competition.

In 2013, Bennet became a judge on Sirasa Super Star season 5.

In 2018, Bennet became a judge on the singing reality show Hiru Star on Hiru TV. He stayed on the show for the first three seasons.

In 2020, he released a wedding song called, "Oba Magemai".

== Brand ambassador ==
He acted as the brand ambassador for the Mobitel Smart 5, and for the Tiara Rollo cake by Ceylon Biscuits Limited.

== Albums ==
- Dreamz of Shihan (2006)
- Dreamz 2 – My Life (2008)

== Track listing ==
Dreamz of Shihan album included songs
No.	Title	Length
1.	"A Sonduru Samanal Wiye" (album version)	04.48
2.	"Ada Thaniyen Maa" (Music video won the most popular video of the year in the 2009 Derana Music Video Awards.)	04.26
3.	"Asa Gatena" (album version)	04.16
4.	"Hitha Hadana Welawe" (album version)	03.47
5.	"Nethu Kadahalena Tharuwak Wage" (album version)	03.56
6.	"Oba Dutuwa A dine" (album version)
7.	"Obe Senehe Dewatemin" (album version)	04.15
8.	"Sithin Pathanna Maa" (Album Version)	03.45
9.	"Sudo Sudu Aadare" (album version)
10.	"Sudu Rosa Mal Watila Thibuna" (album version)

== Track listing ==
Dreamz 2-My Life album included songs
No.	Title	Lyrics	Music	Length
1.	"Aadara Hegumata Idadenna" (album version – A commercial version was produced for Ceylon Biscuits Limited's chocolate brand.)	Nandana Wickramage	Rukshan Mark	03.24
2.	"Jeewithe Pura"
3.	"Kiyannepa" (album version)	Shihan Mihiranga	Shihan Mihiranga
4.	"Mathakai Hitha Haduwa Edaa" (album version)	Shihan Mihiranga	Shihan Mihiranga	04.28
5.	"Mathakai Obe Muwe Sina" (album version)			04.09
6.	"Oba Giya" (Shihan's first album contains a slow version of this song. Second album's song is of rock genre.)
7.	"Mata nela ganna beri" (Album Version)	Nandana Wickramage	Rukshan Mark	03.34
8.	"Obada Maa" (Album Version)			04.51
9.	"Paaya Neela Ambare" (album version)	Nandana Wickramage	Nalin Perera	03.58
10.	"Pini Bindu" (album version)	Nandana Wickramage	Rookantha Gunathilake
11.	"Pini Poda Watena Arunalle" (album version)			04.23
12.	"Mihiraviye" (album version)	Nandana Wickramage	Theja Iddamalgoda	04.00
13.	"Sina Mal Kekulu Pubudaa" (album version)			04.28
14.	"Sulangak Wela" (album version)	Nandana Wickramage	Nalin Perera	04.12

== Single song tracks released ==
Solo Tracks
No.	Title	Length
1.	"Maa Dase Wedana (Remake)" (solo track version)	04.28
2.	"Mage Hithata Eya Denuna" (solo track version)	04.30
3.	"Me As Diha Balan" (solo track version)	03.24
4.	"Perada Mawu Sina (Film Song)" (solo track version)	04.13
5.	"Ron Suwada Dena (Duet with female singer Uresha Ravihari as a Film Song)" (solo track version)	04.00
6.	"Ra Sihinen (Remake of Original song of singer Namal Udugama)" (solo track version)	03.45
7.	"Wassane" (solo track version)	03.40
8.	"Hathara Kendare" (solo track version)	03.30
9.	"Raya Pibidee (Film Song of Super Six)" (solo track version)	03.31
10.	"Oba Kauruda" (solo track version)	04.39
11.	"Thaniyen Ipadunu Nisa" (solo track version)	03.26
12.	"Ridawana Jeevithe" (solo track version)	04.11
13.	"Mage Wela Laga Unnu Oya" (solo track version)	03.20
14.	"Yawwane Sihina Yata Delwune" (solo track version – Theme song of Sirasa Superstar Generation 4)	03.35
15.	"Es Deka Piyana (Remake of Rookantha Gunathilake song)" (solo track version)	04.12
16.	"Ahasama Ridawa (Jodha Akbar Teledrama Theme song with Nirosha Virajini)" (solo track version)	02.40
17.	"Senehe Ammage (Accompany with Kasun Kalhara, Nirosha Virajini and Umaria Sinhawansa)" (solo track version)	04.04
18.	"Daiwaya Ape" (solo track version)	03.52
19.	"Obage Mathaken" (solo track version)	03.59
20.	"Athi Mawa Rewatuwa" (solo track version)	03.46
21.	"Dinaka Mage" (solo track version)	03.23
22.	"Oba Magemai" (solo track version)
