= Eda Raa =

Eda Raa: One Voice, Million Hearts
- එදා රෑ
- Directed by: Aruna Jayawardana
- Written by: Suneth Malinga Lokuhewa; Priyanath Vidanapathirana
- Based on: Diwi Gamane Gim Niwu Minisa by Dhammika Salwathura
- Produced by: Chamika Manjula; Dr. Arosha Fernando; Ranil Mallawarachchi; Nirasha Mallawarachchi
- Starring: Roshan Ravindra; Nethmi Roshel; Senali Fonseka; Sheshadri Priyasad
- Cinematography: Channa Deahapriya
- Edited by: Shan Alwis
- Music by: Suresh Maliyadde
- Production companies: One Line Production & Entertainment
- Distributed by: EAP Movies
- Release date: 18 September 2026
- Running time: 145 minutes
- Country: Sri Lanka
- Language: Sinhala
- Box office: Rs. 1000 millions

Eda Raa : One Voice, Million Hearts is a 2026 Sri Lankan Sinhala biographical drama film directed by Aruna Jayawardena, released on September 18, 2026. It explores the life, struggles, and musical journey of legendary vocalist Milton Mallawarachchi. Its stars Roshan Ravindra as Milton Mallawarachchi, alongside Nethmi Roshel, Senali Fonseka, Sheshadri Priyasad, Dineth de Silva, and Dharmapriya Dias. Eda Raa is the highest grossing Sri Lankan film of all time and first Sri Lankan film to reach Rs. 1000 million milestone.

== Plot ==
The film explores Milton's journey from his early years to his rise to fame, as well as his inner struggles behind the limelight. In addition to his achievements as a musical giant, it also portrays the intimate moments of a true man who was a loving husband, father and dreamer. Blending captivating visuals and powerful storytelling, the film aims to reintroduce Milton Mallawarachchi to a new generation.

== Cast ==
- Roshan Ravindra as Milton Mallawarachchi
- Nethmi Roshel Rogers as Swarnamala Malathi Mallawarachchi née Panangala
- Senali Fonseka as Annet
- Sheshadrie Priyasad as Priyani Wijesinghe née Dharmadasa
- Dinithi Walgama as Malani Karunaratne née Dharmadasa
- Nayomi Perera as Rukmani Welgama née Dharmadasa
- Roshan Ranawana as Cameo appearance
- Saranga Disasekara as Cameo appearance
- Piyumali Edirisinghe as Cameo appearance
- Nihari Perera as Cameo appearance
- Kalana Gunasekara as Premakeerthi de Alwis
- Vishwa Kodikara as Vijaya Kumaranatunga
- Dineth De Silva as Thissa Kumara Pathirana
- Jehan Appuhamy as Herbert Ranjith Peiris
- Dharmapriya Dias
- Mahendra Weerarathne as H K Dharmadasa
- Milinda Madugalle as Jayantha Dharmadasa
- Jayanath Bandara as Vijaya Ramanayaka
- Senesh Disanayake Bandara as Patrick Denipitiya
- Dileepa Abeysekare as Karunarathna Abeysekare
- Biyanka Amarasinghe as Victor Rathnayaka
- Anuruddhika Padukkage as Milton's mother
- Himali Siriwardena as Rukmani Devi
- Janith Wickremage as Gamini Fonseka
- Dulanjana Dilshan
- Tharanga Dissanayake as M S Fernando
- Shashiranga Wickramasekare as Leslie Gomez
- Suran Dassanayake
- Ishan Mendis
- Ferny Roshini as Swarna's mother
- Prasanna Dekumpitiya
- Kasun Gammana
- Mayura Kanchana as Mohammed Sali
- Amiththa Weerasinge
- Dhanushka Dias as Patrick Corea
- Chinthaka Kulatunga as Swarna's father
- Hiran Yattovita
- Ishara Pramuditha
- Milinda S Thennakoon
- Venura Kavinda
- Wimukthi Bandara
- Disali Petersz
