= Milton Mallawarachchi =

Sri Lankan singer (1944–1998)

Milton Mallawarachchi මිල්ටන් මල්ලවාරච්චි
- Born: Sumanasiri Mallawarachchi Don; 7 April 1944; Kotte, Ceylon
- Died: 10 March 1998 (aged 53); Colombo, Sri Lanka
- Resting place: Borella Cemetery
- Education: Ananda Sastralaya, Kotte
- Occupations: Singer, composer, playback singer
- Notable work: Oruwaka Pawena; Eda Re; Me Mai Gaha Yata; Awasara Netha Mata
- Spouse: Swarnamala Malathi (m. 1973)
- Children: Ranil, Harshani, Nadeeja and Tharaka
- Parents: Upasena Mallawarachchi (father); Agnes née Wickramarachchi (mother)
- Relatives: Pavan (grandson)
- Musical career
- Genres: Pop; Film music
- Instruments: Vocals, Tabla, Dholak, Guitar
- Years active: 1969–1998
- Labels: Exvee; Gemtone; Silverline; Tharanga; Singlanka; Torana; Ransilu

Sumanasiri Mallawarachchi Don (7 April 1944 – 10 March 1998; Sinhala: මිල්ටන් මල්ලවාරච්චි), popularly known as Milton Mallawarachchi, was a Sri Lankan singer, composer and film playback singer. Known as the "Prince of Love Songs", he was one of the most popular singers in Sri Lanka in the 1970s and 1980s, and for many years the most sought-after vocalist at musical shows. At a time when Hindi film melodies dominated Sinhala popular music, he built his career entirely on original Sinhala melodies, many of which he composed himself. Over a career of nearly three decades he recorded more than 850 songs and sang for over 100 films, winning the Sarasaviya Award for Best Male Playback Singer in 1984. His life is the subject of the 2026 biographical film Eda Raa.

== Early life ==
Mallawarachchi was born on 7 April 1944 in Kotte, British Ceylon, the only child of Upasena Mallawarachchi and Agnes Wickramarachchi. He never knew his father, and was raised by his mother in poverty; the family lived in a thatched house on temple land in Mirihana. He was educated at Ananda Sastralaya, Kotte, where he won first place in a singing competition in grade four. As a boy he was devoted to the Hindi film songs of Mohammed Rafi, Mukesh and Talat Mahmood; one of his teachers, Trilicia Abeykoon (later the actress Trilicia Gunawardena), once punished him for singing a Hindi song in class.

After leaving school he worked as a bill clerk at the Welikada Co-operative and later as a clerk and cashier for the Nawaloka group. To earn extra money he also did odd jobs, including weekend work on construction sites.

== Career ==
=== Beginnings (1965–1969) ===
Mallawarachchi's love of music took him to weddings and parties, where he sang and played the dholak. In the mid-1960s he sang with two groups: the Sakyans, formed with Herbert Ranjith Peiris (later a film director), in which he was lead singer, performing popular songs from Hindi films such as Dosti, Arzoo and Brahmachari at weddings and paduru parties with Peiris on the harmonium; and the calypso group La Ceylonians led by Noel Ranasinghe, with whom he sang on songs such as Daha Duka Vindala and Mal Ravamal, and whose recordings led to his discovery.

His start was difficult. He was initially dismissed by some as having an "unmusical" voice, and he and lyricist Sunil Dharmasena once walked along the railway line to an audition because they could not afford the bus fare. Composer Victor Rathnayake, who had sung Hindi songs alongside him at informal gatherings, became an early mentor; according to Rathnayake, when Mallawarachchi was starting out "he took him, nurtured him, moulded him, and released him".

While La Ceylonians were recording at Sarasavi Studio, sound engineer Mervyn Rodrigo noticed Mallawarachchi's voice and urged Patrick Corea of Gauri Corporation to record him, predicting that he could become "Lanka's Jim Reeves". Corea commissioned four songs written by Karunaratne Abeysekera, and composer Mohamed Sally created an original melody for the first of them, Oruwaka Pawena, at the harmonium. The four songs – Oruwaka Pawena, Ran Kooduwak Oba Sadu, Sansare Sewanalle and Mangale Neth Mangale – were released on the Exvee label as a double set of 78 rpm records in 1969. Oruwaka Pawena became an instant hit, and its set is regarded as the last 78 rpm release of non-film songs in Sri Lanka. As the songs spread, Mallawarachchi began to receive a flood of fan letters, which friends helped him answer.

=== Original melodies ===
Although he had grown up singing Hindi film songs, Mallawarachchi never sang Sinhala songs set to Hindi tunes, and later said so with pride. In the late 1960s and 1970s the "craze for Hindi melodies" dominated the local music industry; together with contemporaries such as Victor Rathnayake, Clarence Wijewardena and Priya Suriyasena, Mallawarachchi overcame it by building an identity on original work. He went through rejections and setbacks, but did not follow passing trends, believing that a good voice and quality songs would outlast them. Many of his most popular songs were set to his own melodies.

=== Rise to fame (1970–1974) ===
As Oruwaka Pawena became popular with radio listeners, he passed a voice audition with the help of broadcasters Premakeerthi de Alwis and Ariyadasa Peiris, and in 1970 became a Grade A singer at the Sri Lanka Broadcasting Corporation. Further records produced by Corea followed on extended plays, including Madhu Mala, Piyapath Sala, Ma Neth Kadalle and Sithum Pathum. Composer Patrick Denipitiya gave songs such as Ivuru Thala, Ma Ha Eda and Ma Nisa Oba a modern sound with electric guitars, keyboards and drums. He paid for the recording of Ivuru Thala himself, and was left with only about Rs. 240 after paying the musicians and studio.

He debuted as a film playback singer in 1971 with Poojithayo, singing Sakwala Rathwana to music by Premasiri Khemadasa. Rathnayake had earlier introduced him to director Sathischandra Edirisinghe, for whose film Matara Achchi he sang the theme song Ran Dedunu Ran Patin. His first duet was Bindu Bindu with R. Chitra.

Mallawarachchi was a fan of Jim Reeves and wanted to record songs with a similar Western touch, which led him to Clarence Wijewardena. In 1974 he recorded four songs with Wijewardena and the Super Golden Chimes for the Gemtone label – Eda Re, Gana Andure, Maga Thotadi and Mata Men Ohutada – written by K. D. K. Dharmawardena to Mallawarachchi's own melodies and arranged by Wijewardena. All four became instant hits. According to his wife, he was not yet widely known when he proposed to her in 1973, but by the birth of their first son in 1974 he was hugely popular and much in demand as a playback singer. The same year he was the main male playback singer in the box office hit Senakeliya, including Reyak Upadda and duets with Indrani Perera, to music by Denipitiya.

=== Peak years (1974–1984) ===
Through the 1970s and early 1980s Mallawarachchi was among the most popular singers in the country, with a large following among young people who loved his romantic songs. He was a "household name", and "the most wanted singer" at musical shows across the island. While H. R. Jothipala was the leading film playback singer of the era, Mallawarachchi was regarded as unequalled in romantic songs and songs of longing (viraha gee).

He continued to record with Wijewardena and the Super Golden Chimes, producing hits such as Ma Ha Senehasa Pala, Sulange Pawee, Awasara Netha Mata, Ada Heta Oba Ma and Pem Raja Dahane, a duet with Rukmani Devi. Wijewardena also wrote Thaniwee Sitinnai, which he considered his own best composition. One of his most successful songs, Me Mai Gaha Yata, written by Ajantha Ranasinghe with music by Melroy Dharmaratne of the Dharmaratne Brothers, was released on the Silverline label in 1976. He also worked with Stanley Peiris (Hada Pathule, Hadannepa Dan) and Sarath Dassanayake (Api Eka Pedesaka, Pani Kurullane).

In 1978 he released the first pre-recorded music cassette in Sinhala music history, originally titled Any Time Any Where and later renamed Sanden Eha. Produced by Vijaya Ramanayake on the Tharanga label, it contained 14 songs arranged by Sarath Dassanayake and Clarence Wijewardena. He thus recorded both at the end of the gramophone era and at the start of the cassette era.

He was the leading voice for Gamini Fonseka in films, beginning with Reyak Upadda in Senakeliya (1974); film hits included Vikasitha Pethuman in Asha Dasin (1978), Upul Nuwan Vidaha in Lester James Peries's Ahasin Polowata (1978), and Sanda Thaniwela in Apeksha. On 21 July 1984 he won the Sarasaviya Award for Best Male Playback Singer for Kendan Yannam Ran Mal Mala Dala from Sena Samarasinghe's Aethin Aethata, sung with Priya Suriyasena and Gratien Ananda. At the same ceremony his former teacher, Trilicia Gunawardena, won Best Supporting Actress. He also sang in several other films directed by Samarasinghe, including Nilla Soya, Asha Dasin, Mal Kekulu and Chanchala Rekha. In the mid-1980s he was the singing voice of Pakistani actor Javed Sheikh in Samarasinghe's Sri Lanka–Pakistan co-productions Sadakal Randewa (1984) and Sinha Pataw (1985), singing duets with Chandralekha Perera such as Asha Ron and Min Perath Oba. He also sang in Samarasinghe's later films Dhonkaaraya (1987), including Paata Malak Hinawewee with Perera, Ottui Baruwata (1993), in which he sang Inna Wewi Damwalak Se for Gamini Fonseka, and Saagara Peraliya (1998). He sang for over 100 films in all.

Mallawarachchi was a major live attraction. At a time when Sri Lanka had no television, his appearances at variety shows sponsored by the Ceylon Tobacco Company drew thousands, and audiences would not let him leave the stage, calling for encore after encore; he was always among the top two or three live performers of the time. He was given a concert of his own by the Ceylon Tobacco Company and Mahajana Sampatha, and was invited by Wijewardena to perform with the Super Golden Chimes. He never performed abroad, turning down numerous invitations because of a fear of flying.

=== Later career (1985–1998) ===
After his years with the Tharanga label, he recorded for the Singlanka label, which released a number of popular songs into the 1990s, including Andurin Piri, Veedi Kone, Pani Kurullane, Sandawe Ranwala and Punchi Sina Kohedo. He also sang songs dedicated to his four children: Ranil Puthe, Duwe Harshani, Pipunu Mal Dekaku and Tharaka Puthe. He sang Sinhala songs for dubbed versions of Pakistani, Nepalese and Bangladeshi films. In 1996 he recorded Me Lowa Gemburui with his son Ranil for Ranil's first album.

His last recorded song was Aga Rejiniya on the album Senehasa Biduwak, and he last sang Sanda Sulange Pawee for the television serial Hima Kadalla. In 1997 he sang for the films Mohothin Mohotha and Re Ru, both released after his death.

== Musical style ==
Mallawarachchi specialised in romantic songs, especially songs of lost or unrequited love. Critics describe his voice as warm, romantic and immediately recognisable; what he lacked in vocal range and texture he made up for with his articulation and evident sincerity. He chose songs with a clear narrative, and paid particular attention to finding a melody that would hold the listener's attention. He preferred light music, with the saxophone and guitar accompanying his voice. The songs he recorded with Wijewardena and Denipitiya brought a Western pop sound to Sinhala romantic song.

== Personal life ==
On 23 December 1973 he married Swarnamala Malathi Panangala. His mother had died earlier that year, and the couple began their married life in a rented house before building their own home in Udahamulla. The song Etha Epita Dura Akase, written by Karunaratne Abeysekera, is dedicated to his wife. The couple had four children: Ranil, Harshani, Nadeeja and Tharaka.

His eldest son Ranil Mallawarachchi is also a singer, who has continued his father's legacy by performing his songs at concerts. His younger son Tharaka is also a singer, and Ranil's son Pavan, a trained commercial pilot, also performs his grandfather's songs.

A devout Buddhist, Mallawarachchi observed the five precepts daily and was close to the Venerable Gangodawila Soma Thera from childhood. He was a keen cricket fan who attended Test and One Day International matches, and was a friend of early Sri Lankan Test cricketers such as Bandula Warnapura, Roy Dias and Duleep Mendis.

== Death ==
Mallawarachchi died on 10 March 1998 at Nawaloka Hospital in Colombo, at the age of 53. He is buried in Kanatte Cemetery.

== Legacy ==
Decades after his death, Mallawarachchi's songs continue to be played regularly on radio and television, and are sung at parties, school big matches and social gatherings.

The first tribute concert in his honour was held at the Nelum Pokuna Theatre in Colombo on 19 January 2013, featuring his son Ranil, his grandson, and singers who had worked with him. Further tributes followed, including The Legacy of Clarence & Milton at the Musaeus College auditorium in February 2024 and the Memories of Milton Mallawarachchi concert series.

In July 2026 lyricist and journalist Dhammika Salwathura published a biography, Divi Gamane Gim Niwu Minisa. A biographical film based on his life, Eda Raa, directed by Aruna Jayawardena with Roshan Ravindra in the title role, was released on 18 September 2026. It was co-produced by his son Ranil and daughter-in-law Nirasha, and features 26 of his songs re-recorded by Ranil, Tharaka and Pavan Mallawarachchi. According to its producers the film set several Sri Lankan box office records, and Mawrata News reported its earnings as exceeding Rs. 809 million.

== Discography ==
=== Early 78 rpm and EP releases ===
All produced by Patrick Corea on the Exvee label.

Catalogue	Format	Year	Tracks
JVPC 1016	78 rpm	1969	Mangale Neth Mangale, Oruwaka Pawena
JVPC 1017	78 rpm	1969	Ran Kooduwak Oba Sadu, Sansare Sewanalle
JVPC 1051	EP	–	Madhu Mala, Sanda Dilunath, Sihina Mawe, Malak Dutim
JVPC 1057	EP	–	Paya Aa Sanda, Gamane Gim Niwu, Piya Path Sala, Lowa Satha Pena
JVPC 1061	EP	–	Adaraye, Ma Neth Kadalle, Bindu Bindu, Atha Epita
JVPC 1069	EP	–	Netha Nopiya, Obe Nil Nuwan, Sithum Pathum, Nidibara Sithuwili

=== Selected later releases ===
- Eda Re / Gana Andure / Maga Thotadi / Mata Men Ohutada – EP with Clarence Wijewardena and the Super Golden Chimes, Gemtone (1974)
- Me Mai Gaha Yata / Ran Mudu – EP shared with Shiromie Fernando, Silverline (1976)
- Any Time Any Where (later Sanden Eha) – the first Sinhala pre-recorded music cassette, Tharanga (1978)
- Senehasa Biduwak – his last recorded album

== Filmography ==
Year	Film	Roles	Ref.
1971	Poojithayo	Playback Singer	
1971	Ran Onchilla	Playback Singer	
1971	Seeye Nottuwa	Playback Singer	
1972	Adare Hithenawa Dakkama	Playback Singer	
1973	Matara Achchi	Playback Singer	
1973	Sinawai Inawai	Playback Singer	
1974	Senakeliya	Playback Singer	
1974	Wasthuwa	Playback Singer	
1974	Jeewana Ganga	Playback Singer	
1975	Kaliyuga Kaale	Playback Singer	
1975	Cyril Malli	Playback Singer	
1975	Lassana Kella	Playback Singer	
1975	Kokilayo	Playback Singer	
1975	Rajagedara Paraviyo	Playback Singer	
1975	Damayanthi	Playback Singer	
1975	Lassana Dawasak	Playback Singer	
1976	Ganga	Playback Singer	
1976	Duhulu Malak	Playback Singer	
1976	Loka Horu	Playback Singer	
1976	Aasha	Playback Singer	
1976	Hariyata Hari	Playback Singer	
1976	Saradielge Putha	Playback Singer	
1976	Mangala	Playback Singer	
1976	Nilla Soya	Playback Singer	
1977	Sri Madara	Playback Singer	
1977	Maruwa Samaga Wase	Playback Singer	
1978	Seetha Devi	Playback Singer	
1978	Madhuwanthi	Playback Singer	
1978	Asha Dasin	Playback Singer	
1978	Apeksha	Playback Singer	
1978	Kumara Kumariyo	Playback Singer	
1978	Sandawata Rantharu	Playback Singer	
1978	Ahasin Polowata	Playback Singer	
1979	Nuwan Renu	Playback Singer	
1980	Mal Kekulu	Playback Singer	
1980	Kanchana	Playback Singer	
1980	Silva	Playback Singer	
1980	Seetha	Playback Singer	
1980	Api Dedena	Playback Singer	
1981	Sayuru Thera	Playback Singer	
1981	Eka Dawasak Ra	Playback Singer	
1981	Aradhana	Playback Singer	
1981	Samawenna	Playback Singer	
1981	Chanchala Rekha	Playback Singer	
1982	Mihidum Sihina	Playback Singer	
1982	Thani Tharuwa	Playback Singer	
1982	Anuradha	Playback Singer	
1982	Jeewithayen Jeewithayak	Playback Singer	
1982	Newatha Hamuwemu	Playback Singer	
1983	Chandira	Playback Singer	
1983	Samuganimi Maa Samiyani	Playback Singer	
1983	Athin Athata	Playback Singer	
1983	Thunhiri Mal	Playback Singer	
1983	Samanala Sihina	Playback Singer	
1984	Shirani	Playback Singer	
1984	Niwan Dakna Jathi Dakwa	Playback Singer	
1984	Hadawathaka Wedana	Playback Singer	
1984	Batti	Playback Singer	
1984	Birinda	Playback Singer	
1984	Sadakal Randewa	Playback Singer	
1985	Rajina	Playback Singer	
1985	Sudu Mama	Playback Singer	
1985	Sinha Pataw	Playback Singer	
1986	Yali Hamuwennai	Playback Singer	
1987	Obatai Priye Adare	Playback Singer	
1987	Dhonkaaraya	Playback Singer	
1990	Dedunnen Samanaliyak	Playback Singer	
1990	Pem Rajadahana	Playback Singer	
1990	Madhu Sihina	Playback Singer	
1991	Sihina Ahase Wasanthaya	Playback Singer	
1991	Bambara Kalapaya	Playback Singer	
1993	Sergeant Nallathambi	Playback Singer	
1993	Lassanai Balanna	Playback Singer	
1993	Ottui Baruwata	Playback Singer	
1994	Sandamadala	Playback Singer	
1995	Inspector Geetha	Playback Singer	
1995	Rodaya	Playback Singer	
1995	Ira Handa Illa	Playback Singer	
1995	Chandiyage Putha	Playback Singer	
1995	Edath Chandiya Adath Chandiya	Playback Singer	
1995	Sudu Walassu	Playback Singer	
1996	Sihina Vimane Kumariya	Playback Singer	
1996	Bawa Sasara	Playback Singer	
1996	Madhuri	Playback Singer	
1997	Surayo Wedakarayo	Playback Singer	
1997	Ramba Saha Madhu	Playback Singer	
1997	Good Bye Tokyo	Playback Singer	
1998	Mohothin Mohotha	Playback Singer	
1998	Saagara Peraliya	Playback Singer	
1999	Re Ru	Playback Singer	
1999	Ayadimi Sama	Playback Singer	
1999	Rathu Aluyama	Playback Singer	
2000	Danduwama	Playback Singer	
2001	Oba Magema Wewa	Playback Singer	
2008	Superstar	Playback Singer	
2008	Ai Oba Thaniwela	Playback Singer	
