= Sirasa Superstar =

- Presented by: Kamal Addararachchi (Season 1-3); Shihan Mihiranga, Nirosha Perera (Season 4); Devashrie De Silva (Season 5); Dasun Madushan (Season 6); Manuranga Wijesekara, Tehani Imara (Season 7)
- Judges: Season 1 - Nirosha Virajini, Jagath Wickramasinghe, Rookantha Goonatillake; Season 2 - Chandrika Siriwardena, Raju Bandara, Jagath Wickramasinghe; Season 3 - Jagath Wickramasinghe, Samitha Mudunkotuwa, Amal Perera; Season 4 - Heshan Gamage, Corrin Almeda, Madhumadhawa Aravinda; Season 5 - Shihan Mihiranga, Nirosha Virajini, Heshan Gamage; Season 6 - Heshan Gamage, Amila Nadeeshani, Dumal Warnakulasooriya; Season 7 - Ernest de Zoysa, Thanuja Jayawardena, Romesh Sugathapala, Umaria Sinhawansa
- Country of origin: Sri Lanka
- No. of seasons: 7

Original release
- Network: Sirasa TV
- Release: 9 July 2005 – 9 July 2016

Sirasa Superstar was a musical reality show conducted in Sri Lanka by the TV channel Sirasa TV. The first four seasons were inspired by the program called American Idol an American singing competition series, the fifth and sixth seasons are similar to The Voice. The seventh season was finished on 9 July 2016. The show has been succeeded by The Voice Sri Lanka from 2020 onwards.

== Overview ==
The goal is to find the most talented upcoming singer in the country. On average, about 2,000 audition. Out of all those who audition, 100 contestants were chosen to advance. Next, each contestant is given a chance to perform two songs, and from several groups, 48 contestants are chosen by the judging panel. Then, viewers are given a limited time period to vote for their favorites in the respective rounds (that is, Final 24, Final 12, and Final 2, through the SMS system).

The 12 finalists perform one song each week (two songs in later rounds) based on who the viewers vote for. The contestant with the fewest votes is eliminated every week. The final show is held at the Sugathadasa Indoor Stadium Sugathadasa Stadium, among an audience of 240,000. According to the number of votes received by each contestant on that day, the one with the higher number is crowned the Sirasa Superstar and the other becomes the Runner-up. For Season II, the winner will be awarded an Rs. 3.4 million worth car and Rs, one million in cash, in addition to a trophy.

From season 4 to onward, the grand finale is held at the Stein Studios of Ratmalana, which is a private property of Sirasa TV. The cash prize also changed in the fifth season, where the winner won 10 million Sri Lankan rupees. The performing stages also changed from season five, with the inclusion of Battle Round and Live Audition Round.

== Season 1 ==
The first season of Sirasa Superstar marked the beginning of reality shows in Sri Lanka. After more than 22000 contestants, final 12 was selected by the judges. All 12 finalists were males, where each contestant had different singing abilities.

Sirasa Superstar
- Season 1
- Hosted by: Kamal Addararachchi
- Judges: Nirosha Virajini; Rookantha Gunathilake; Jagath Wickramasinghe
- Winner: Ajith Bandara
- Runner-up: Malith Perera

Release
- Original release: 2005 – 2006

=== Final 12 of Season I (2006) ===
1. Ajith Bandara (Winner)
2. Malith Perera (runner up)]
3. Amila Perera
4. Darshana Pramod
5. Shihan Mihiranga
6. Manjula Pushpakumara
7. Nishantha Nanayakkara
8. Waruna Madushanka
9. Theekshana Anuradha
10. Asela Eranda
11. Madhawa Dassanayake
12. Mohan Dharshana

== Season 2 ==
Winner: Pradeep Rangana took the crown. While being a student at his campus (as he is a medical student) he presented his talents to the world through this competition. He achieved the "Crown". His most famous songs are Sihina Ahase, Sanda Moduwella & Mey Sauwmye Rathrie. The First Runner Up was Surendra Perera.

Sirasa Superstar
- Season 2
- Hosted by: Kamal Addararachchi
- Judges: Chandrika Siriwardena; Raju Bandara; Jagath Wickramasinghe
- Winner: Pradeep Rangana
- Runner-up: Surendra Perera

Release
- Original release: 2007 – 28 October 2007

=== Final 12 of Season II (2007) ===
1. Pradeep Rangana (Winner)
2. Surendra Perera
3. Amila Nadeeshani
4. Gamini Susiriwardana
5. Nadini Premadasa
6. Sanka Dineth
7. Buddhika Ushan
8. Manjula Nivanthi
9. Maheshika Lakmali
10. Nalinda Ranasinghe
11. Wathsala Madhumali
12. Gayani Madhusha

The Competitors who got the fewest SMS votes every week

| Date | Bottom Three |
| August 19 | Gayani Madhusha | Wathsala Madhumali | Maheshika Lakmali |
| August 26 | Wathsala Madhumali | Manjula Nivanthi | Sanka Dineth |
| September 2 | Nalinda Ranasinghe | Manjula Nivanthi | Maheshika Lakmali |
| September 9 | Maheshika Lakmali | Manjula Nivanthi | Amila Nadeeshani |
| September 16 | Manjula Nivanthi | Sanka Dineth | Amila Nadeeshani |
| September 23 | Buddhika Ushan Premaratne | Sanka Dineth | Amila Nadeeshani |
| September 30 | Sanka Dineth | Nadini Premadasa | Gamini Susiriwardana |
| | Final Five (Bottom Two) |
| October 7 | Nadini Premadasa | Pradeep Rangana |
| October 14 | Gamini Susiriwardana | Amila Nadeeshani |
| | Final Three |
| October 21 | Amila Nadeeshani |
| October 28 | Surendra Perera | Pradeep Rangana |

== Season 3 ==
Sirasa Superstar
- Season 3
- Hosted by: Kamal Addararachchi
- Judges: Chandrika Siriwardena; Raju Bandara; Jagath Wickramasinghe; Samitha Mudunkotuwa; Amal Perera
- Winner: Shanika Madhumali
- Runner-up: Arjuna Rookantha

Release
- Original release: 2010 – 2010

=== Final 12 of Season III (After the Wildcard Round) ===
Shanika Madhumali adjudged the winner of the Sirasa Super Star Season 3 was held on 8 May 2010 at the CR and FC Grounds. 12 finalists were eventually chosen, among the 107,000 who applied, hoping for a shot at stardom. Week after week, the finalists were put through grueling challenges testing their showmanship and vocal prowess and performed before a judging panel consisting of Jagath Wickramasinghe, Chandrika Siriwardene, Raju Bandara, Samitha Mudunkotuwa and Amal Perera. Shanika Madhumali and Arjuna Rookantha were selected, and Shanika was the winner of the 'Sirasa Super Star' title.

1. Shanika Madhumali (Winner)
2. Arjuna Rookantha
3. Dumal Warnakulasuriya
4. Champika Priyashantha
5. Kasun Chamikara
6. Dilki Weliwatta
7. Eranda Pathum
8. Lakmini Udawatta
9. Thulani Sithara
10. Rukman Asitha
11. Chethana Sankalani
12. Meena Prasadini

The Competitors who got the fewest SMS votes every week

| Date | Bottom Three |
| January 10 | Meena Prasadini | Champika Priyashantha | Chethana Sankalani |
| January 17 | Chethana Sankalani | Thulani Sithara | Dilki Weliwatta |
| January 31 | Rukman Asitha | Kasun Chamikara | Eranda Pathum |
| February 7 | Thulani Sithara | Eranda Pathum | Dumal Warnakulasooriya |
| February 14 | Arjuna Rookantha | Kasun Chamikara | Eranda Pathum |
| | Final 7 Part 1 Elimination |
| February 21 | Lakmini Udawatta | Eranda Pathum | Dumal Warnakulasooriya |
| February 27 | Dumal Warnakulasooriya | Champika Priyashantha | Dilki Weliwatta |
| | Final 7 Part 2 Elimination |
| March 14 | Eranda Pathum | Kasun Chamikara | Arjuna Rookantha |
| | Final 6 |
| March 21 | Dilki Weliwatta | Champika Priyashantha | Kasun Chamikara |
| March 28 | Kasun Chamikara | Dumal Warnakulasooriya | Champika Priyashantha |
| | Final 4 (Bottom 2) |
| April 18 | Champika Priyashantha | Dumal Warnakulasooriya |
| April 25 | Dumal Warnakulasooriya | Arjuna Rookantha |
| May 8 | Arjuna Rookantha | Shanika Madhumali |

== Season 4 - Generation Four ==
Sirasa Superstar
- Season 4
- Hosted by: Shihan Mihiranga & Nirosha Perera
- Judges: Heshan Gamage; Samitha Mudunkotuwa; Corrin Almeda; Madhumadhawa Aravinda
- Winner: Thisara Chanaka
- Runner-up: Udith Sanjaya

Release
- Original release: 2011 – 2011

The fourth Season of Sirasa Superstar Generation Four.

Thisara Chanaka won the 4th season of superstar known as Generation 4. He had a soft high pitched voice that was admired by the judges Madhumadhawa Aravinda, Corin Almeda, and Nimantha Heshan. His famous song during the contest was a Hindi song "Thu hi meri shab hai" which gets enormous popularity in Sri Lanka.

In the grand finale, Sri Lankan popular cricketer, Tillakaratne Dilshan, was appointed as a judge also. This gave a much publicity all over the country.

=== Final 12 of Generation Four ===
1. Thisara Chanaka (Winner)
2. Uditha Sanjaya
3. Isuru Randika
4. Shahil Himansa
5. Michel Christine
6. Shani Angela
7. Supun Perera
8. Thilani Kanchana
9. Chaminda Abeywardana
10. Randika Rochana
11. Buddima Madushani
12. Kasun Madushanka

== Season 5 - The Next Voice ==
Sirasa Superstar
- Season 5
- Hosted by: Devashrie De Silva
- Judges: Heshan Gamage; Nirosha Virajini; Shihan Mihiranga
- Winner: Dasun Madushan
- Runner-up: Rasintha Gayan

Release
- Original release: 17 November 2012 – 8 June 2013

The fifth season of Sirasa Super Star is similar to The Voice. The season began in November 2012 with the blind auditions. The blind auditions ended with 22, 18, 20 contestants joining the groups of Virajini, Gamage and Mihiranga respectively. After the blind auditions, the Group Round began and then the battle rounds came up, preceding to Super Battle Rounds where the Final 12 were chosen. During the Super Battle Rounds, Dilnesha Weerakoon was against Sugath Hewage and was not chosen for the Final 12, but was added to the finals when a contestant was dropped. During the Live Shows, a Wildcard contestant who competed in the Super Battle Rounds and was not chosen for the Live Shows will be brought back to the competition and the contestant was Akila Imesh who competed in Gamage's team. The Grand Finale took place on the 8th of June 2013 announcing the winner as Dasun Madushan from Shihan Mihiranga's team. Dasun Madushan won the biggest ever cash prize given in Sri Lankan reality history of 10 million Sri Lankan rupees for the first time, and became the youngest ever artist to win so.

=== The Final 12 of Season 5 ===
1. Dasun Madushan (Winner)
2. Rasintha Gayan
3. Dulaj Ashen
4. Dilnesha Weerakooon
5. Pavithra Kasun
6. Nirosh Chanaka
7. Champika Dilash
8. Virajini Vishwalanka
9. Sugath Hewage
10. Sameera Ekanayake
11. Nazia Naeem
12. Arosha Narmadha

Akila Imesh won the Wild Card round.

Key:

– Winner
– Runner-up
– Third place

| Team | Competitors | | | | |
|---|---|---|---|---|---|
| Heshan Gamage | 11. Nazia Naeem | 4. Dilnesha Weerakoon | 12. Arosha Narmada | 8. Virajini Vishwalanka | Akila Imesh |
| Nirosha Virajini | 7. Champika Dilash | 10. Sameera Ekanayake | 9. Sugath Hewage | Rasintha Gayan | |
| Shihan Mihiranga | 6. Nirosh Chanaka | Dasun Madushan | Dulaj Ashen | 5. Pavithra Kasun | |

== Season 6 - The Sixth Voice ==
Sirasa Superstar
- Season 6
- Hosted by: Dasun Madushan
- Judges: Heshan Gamage; Dumal Warnakulasooriya; Amila Nadeeshani
- Winner: Gayan Arosha
- Runner-up: Chamara Prasad (1st Runner Up)

Release
- Original release: August 2013 – 4 July 2014

The sixth season of Sirasa Super Star is similar to The Voice. The season began in 2013 with the blind auditions. The blind auditions ended with 22, 18, 20 contestants joining the groups of Dumal, Heshan and Amila respectively. After the blind auditions, the Group Round began and then the battle rounds came up, preceding to Super Battle Rounds where the Final 12 were chosen. The Grand Finale took place on the 4th of July 2014 announcing the winner as Gayan Arosha from Dumal Warnakulasooriya's team. Gayan won the a cash prize of 10 million Sri Lankan rupees.

The final 12 of season 6 are stated below, only the winner and runners-up are in order.

=== The Final 12 of Season 6 ===
1. Gayan Arosha (Winner)
2. Chamara Prasad
3. Tehani Imara
4. Sathya Darshani
5. Shiromi Rathnayake
6. Achala Madusanka
7. Nuwan Bulathsinhala
8. Pubudu Harshani
9. Muditha Jayakodi
10. Harsha Chathuranga
11. Sameera Chathuranga
12. Prabakthi Jithendra
13. Kamal

== Season 7 ==
Sirasa Superstar
- Season 7
- Hosted by: Manuranga Wijesekara; Tehani Imara
- Judges: Arnest de Soysa; Romesh Sugathapala; Umaria Sinhawansa; Thanuja Jayawardena
- Winner: Piyath Rajapakse

Release
- Original release: October 2015 – 9 July 2016

The seventh season of Sirasa Super Star underwent in Sirasa Stein Studios from October 2015 to July 2016. The season began in October 2015 and the season selected only 9 finalists in this time, not 12 finalists. On 17 January 2016, the preliminary round finished with a tragedy, where only single winner needed to enter final 8, but judges selected two winners on that day suggesting that both are very clever and both should go for the 8 finalists round. But, with these two contestants, there were 9 finalists, so it is beyond the format. Therefore, those two contestants "Piyath Rajapakse" and "Shehan Udesh" had a people's choice round and Piyth won the people's choice to enter Super 8.

The elimination of Super 8 started on 8 May 2016, where in each round two contestants will eliminate. Sammani Dinusha won first wild card round on 22 May 2016 and entered Final 7. Nelka Thilini won second wild card round on 29 May 2016 and entered final 8. For the first time in Sirasa Superstar contest, four finalists were selected by peoples' vote to decide the winner instead of usual two finalists in previous occasions. The grand final was held at Sirasa Stein Studios on 9 July 2016. Piyath Rajapakse won the 7th title of Sirasa Superstar with a brand new luxury car and a million Sri Lankan rupees.

=== The Finalists of Season 7 ===
1. Piyath Rajapakse
2. Nilan Hettiarachchi
3. Bashi Madhubashini
4. Nelka Thilini
