= Windy Goonatillake =

Sri Lankan singer

Windy Gunatillake
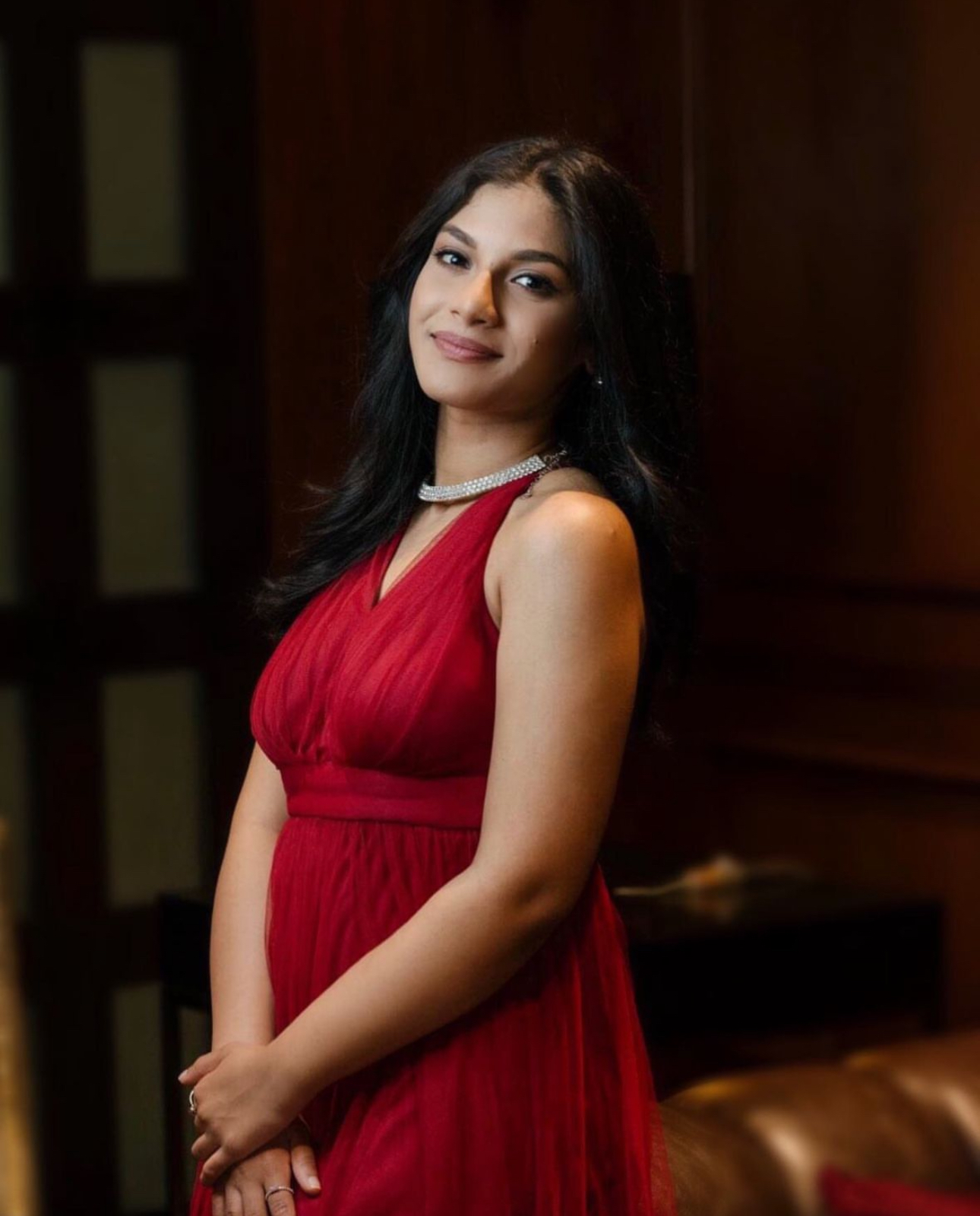
- Born: December 26; New York, USA
- Occupation: Singer
- Known for: Ayyo Saami
- Parents: Rookantha Gunathilake (father); Chandralekha Perera (mother)
- Awards: Edison Awards, SLIM Kantar Peoples Awards, Business World International Awards

Windy Gunatillake is a Sri Lankan singer. Her father Rookantha Gunatillake and mother Chandralekha Perera are both prominent Sri Lankan musicians.

== Personal life ==
Windy Goonatillake (Sinhala: වින්ඩි ගුණතිලක) was born on December 26, in New York, USA. Windy married musician Sanuka Wickramasinghe on 26 December 2022.

== Career ==
Windy made her professional debut with the single, Rau Nagee Ahase in April 2020, written and composed by her father Rookantha Goonatillake, and produced by Sanuka.

She sings the Sri Lankan Tamil-language song Ayyo Saami (also spelt as Aiyo Saami) and the song was unveiled in YouTube in 2022 which went onto become a sleeper hit by garnering a huge widespread attention among Gen Z and then quickly became popular among general public in Sri Lanka. The song also grasped the attention from the majority Sinhalese speaking population in Sri Lanka and the song was also dubbed as an international anthem for women who have been cheated by their boyfriends and husbands. The song, which was composed by Sanuka Wickramasinghe and had lyrics penned by songwriter Pottuvil Asmin, became a viral sensation, garnering over 22 million views on YouTube and also having over 1 million playcounts on Spotify.

In March 2024, she won Sensational Song of the Year for 2023 at the 16th Edison Awards held in Chennai for Ayyo Saami which became a chartbuster hit in Sri Lanka and India

== Discography ==
- Apa Sithana Pathana
- Api Denna
- Ayyo Saami
- Handapane
- Ma Handawala
- Mage Punchi Duwe
- Malak Wage
- Manali
- Maya Deviya
- Numbai Mamai
- Paradeese
- Pinimuwan
- Rau Nagee Ahase
- Sapa Ninde
- Sasara Pura
