= Chandrasena Hettiarachchi =

Chandrasena Hettiarachchi චන්ද්‍රසේන හෙට්ටිආරච්චි
- Born: Hettiarachchige Chandrasena; 7 September; Yatiyanthota, Sri Lanka
- Education: Garagoda Sinhala Junior College
- Occupations: Singer, Music Director
- Spouse: Mangalika Hettiarachchi
- Children: 2
- Parents: Hettiarachchige Gunawardena (father); Waliwita Vidanelage Mary Nona (mother)
- Musical career
- Genres: Pop; soul; rhythm and blues; Indian classical music
- Instrument: Vocals
- Years active: 1979–present
- Labels: Nilwala; Ransilu

Hettiarachchige Chandrasena (Sinhala:චන්ද්‍රසේන හෙට්ටිආරච්චි: born 7 September), popularly known as Chandrasena Hettiarachchi, is a Sri Lankan singer. Having emerged from the youth choir as a group singer, Hettiarachchi has been able to show his talents and sang several popular songs such as Mal Mal Vile, Amma Jeewana, Oya Nisa Mage Sina, Kelesaka Keewath and Nawala Annasi.

== Personal life ==
Chandrasena was born on 7 September in Garagoda, Yatiyanthota as the third child of a rural family with six siblings. His father Hettiarachchige Gunawardena was a mason. His mother Waliwita Vidanelage Mary Nona worked in a rubber plantation. He has one elder brother, one elder sister and three younger sisters. He educated at Garagoda Sinhala Junior College. His mother died on 18 October 2018 at the age of 84.

After school times, he went to work at Mahaweli Development Board in Bathalayaya. He had to cut down forests, roads and drains. However after taking first salary, he quit from the job. Then he packed a box full of plastic items and went from house to house selling them.

He is married to Mangalika Hettiarachchi. The couple has one son Gayana Madhuwantha and one daughter; Lihini Vihanga.

His daughter Lihini is also a singer who started career with the song Irai Hadai. Then she sang the songs, Tharu Dilena Ambare and Man Gawa Thani Wechchi. Lihini went to three schools. She was educated at the Sri Sangamitta Girls' College, Colombo. After that she moved to Gothami Balika in Colombo from the grade six to eleven. Finally studied A/L at Visakha Vidyalaya, Colombo. She is currently an undergraduate at the University of Jayewardenepura.

== Career ==
Since child age, Hettiarachchi participated in the singing competitions for the Sinhala New Year, Vesak and Poson where he was first in all these competitions. He wrote and mailed a song in his own words such as "Jayabhumi Sri Lanka - Rakaganna Jaya Bhumi Lanka" for a singing competition. In 1979 Youth Awards, he sang the first song Jayabhumi Sri Lanka at the Kegalle Girls' College. Hettiarachchi became the first from the Kegalle district and later competed in the All Island competition and became the first.

In 1980, he joined with the youth choir which was first established by the National Youth Services Council (earlier known as Bellwood Music Academy) on September 1. Hettiarachchi learned music under the music teachers Premadasa Mudunkotuwa and Sisira Kumara Marasinghe. His contemporaries of the choir consist with Somasiri Medagedara, Marshall Janatha, Chandralekha Perera, Dhammika Karunaratne and Theja Damayanthi. Musicians Shirley Vaijayantha and Nihal Gamhewa were the lyricists. He sang the first duet Seetha Kandu Yaye with Chandralekha at the Batangala Training Center.

His first recorded song was Lo Satha Hata Setha Sedu. But the first song that first popularized was Thavalam Api Yanawa, composed at the Bellwood Television Village. At Bellwood, he recorded two more songs; Sede Samayay Jeewithe and Yeheliyaka Se. Meanwhile, the artists in the youth choir made a music cassette called "Yowun Gee 1" under the banner "Sangeetha Samagama".

On 20 September 2014, the concert 'Senehase Gee – Oya Nisa' was held at the Maharagama Youth Services Council Theater to celebrate 35 years of singing career.

On 7 September 2018, the concert 'Senehase Gee – Thawalama' was held at 6.30 pm at the Maharagama Youth Services Council Theater to celebrate 40 years of singing career. On 4 July 2020, he was honored with the honorary title "Manawa Hithawadi Keerthi Sri Veeraputhra Deshabandu" by Dharma Shakthi Social Service Foundation.
