= Somasiri Medagedara =

Sri Lankan singer

Somasiri Medagedara සෝමසිරි මැදගෙදර
- Born: 8 November; Walapane, Sri Lanka
- Education: Theripehe Siddhartha Vidyalaya
- Occupations: Singer, Music Director
- Spouse: Neela Seneviratne (m. 1989)
- Children: 3
- Parents: Medagedara Vidyaratne (father); Rankiri (mother)
- Musical career
- Genres: Pop; soul; rhythm and blues; Indian classical music
- Instrument: Vocals
- Years active: 1980–present
- Labels: Nilwala; Ransilu

Somasiri Medagedara (Sinhala:සෝමසිරි මැදගෙදර: born 8 November), is a Sri Lankan singer. Having emerged from the youth choir as a group singer, Medagedara has been able to show his talents and sang several popular songs such as Sandai Tharui, Asa Imu Api, Issara Bedi Pema, Obage Dothin Pidu and Mathu Muthu Wasse.

== Personal life ==
Medagedara was born on 8 November in Theripehe village, Walapane in Nuwara Eliya as the youngest child of a rural family. His father Medagedara Vidyaratne was a farmer. His mother Rankiri was a housewife who helped father for agriculture. Somasiri has five elder brothers. He completed education from Theripehe Siddhartha Vidyalaya. He learned music in the school under the teacher M.M.K Tissa. He is good at reciting Pel Kavi and Virindu songs in the village.

He was married to longtime partner Neela Seneviratne. She met Medagedara in 1984 while working as an Assistant Youth Service Officer at the Maharagama Youth Center after leaving the Bellwood Aesthetic Resort. The couple has two sons – Yasas and Sahan Dhanushka; and one daughter, Yashoda Rasanjali. Yasas is also a singer and a sound engineer.

== Illness ==
In August 2019, the initial symptoms began to subside. At first he went for a doctor because it was difficult to defecate. There was also a tour of America during this time. Before that he went to the United States for medical treatment. After successfully conducting about 9 shows there, he returned to Sri Lanka and appeared for the medical examination. There he knew that a small lump in his stomach had turned into cancer. He stayed in the Apeksha hospital and underwent surgery. After few more days after surgery he went home and got sick again. The body temperature began to rise. Tests carried out there revealed that there was a disease in the liver which was because of the medication taken for the lumps in the intestines.

In 2020, he has been receiving residential treatment at the Maharagama Apeksha Hospital since 13 January. In August 2020, false rumors in the internet stated that he died due to cancer. Later, Medagedara himself made a comment on his false news.

== Career ==
In 1980, he joined with the youth choir which was first established by the National Youth Services Council on 1 September. Medagedara learned music under the music teachers Premadasa Mudunkotuwa and Sisira Kumara Marasinghe. His contemporaries of the choir consist with Chandrasena Hettiarachchi, Marshall Janatha, Chandralekha Perera, Dhammika Karunaratne and Theja Damayanthi. Musicians Shirley Waijayantha and Nihal Gamhewa were the lyricists. He sang his first solo song Salsapu Pipila when he was in the Youth Services Council. The song was written and composed by Shirley Waijayantha. After leaving the band in 1984, he launched the first CD. The CD consists with several popular songs such as Ridawannepa Me Tharam, Sandai Tharui Nisansale and Obe Adare.

On 16 June 1984, Medagedara joined the Youth Services Council as an Assistant Youth Service Officer. Later in 2016 he served as the Assistant Director of its Cultural Division. In 1986, he launched maiden cassette "Magala Yahana". Later in 1989 he launched the album Ahinsakaviya Obata Nowe and Sithak Bindunu Pasu in 1992. In the early millennium, he launched two popular albums with Sunflowers titled "Sunflowers Samaga Somasiri Medagedara". Then in 2004, he made the album "Suwanda Haduwak" and album "Pahan Wetak" in 2011.

He first acted as a music director in the teledrama Irabatu Tharuwa produced by Sriyani Amarasena. Later he composed music for many television serials such as Holman Bottuwa, Depethi and Denethra.

On 19 November 2016, he performed a concert Sandai Tharui at 7.00 pm at the Maharagama Youth Theater to celebrate his 35 years of singing career. On 24 December 2019, he involved in the 'Yowun Gee Mathaka Mansala' live music concert in aid of the Bellwood Alumni Association held at 6.30 pm at the Maharagama Youth Theater.
