= Pottery of Sri Lanka =

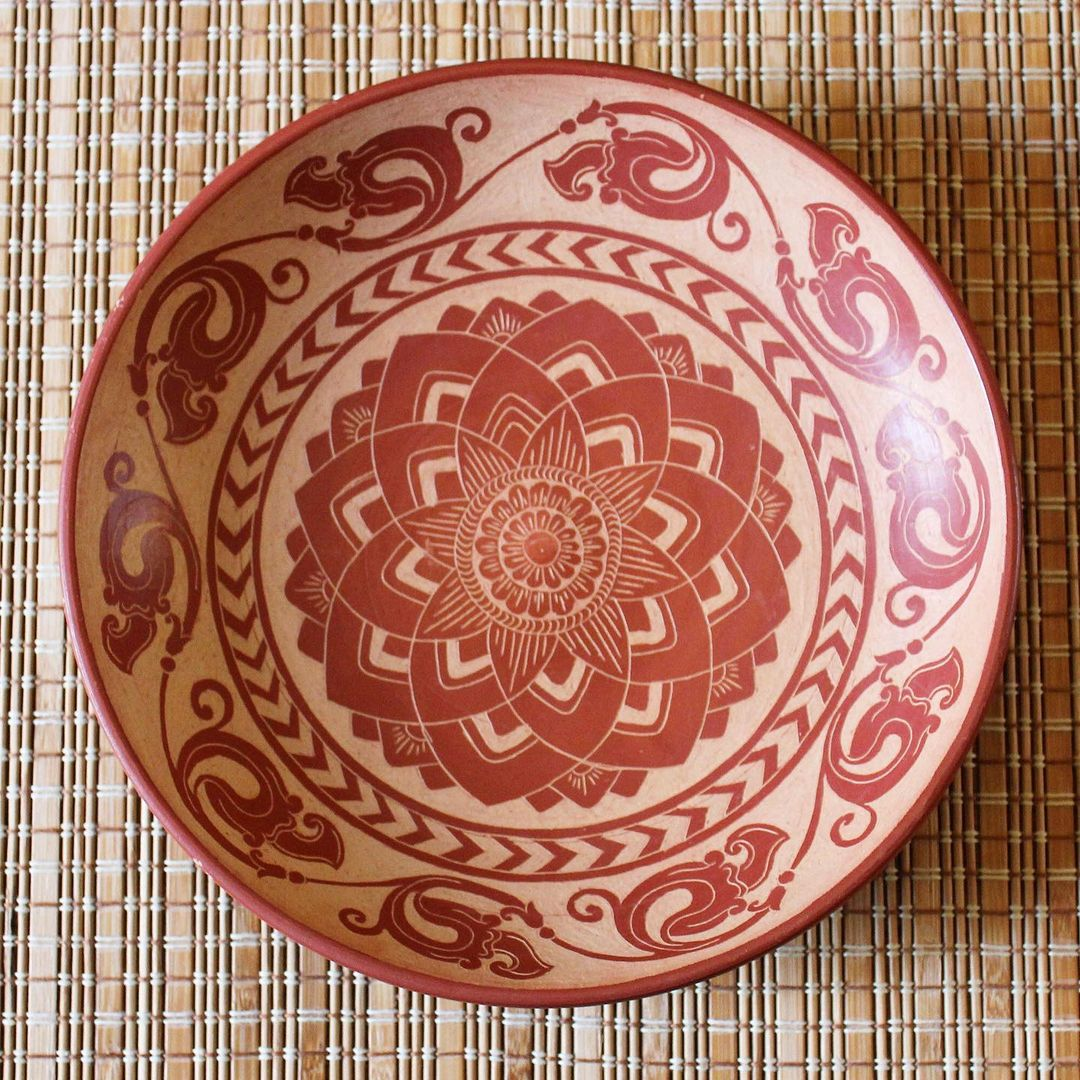
Traditional gurugal pottery of Sri Lanka, it is a type pottery made from "Kirimeti" (kaolin) and "Gurugal"/Guru stone (ferruginous nodules).

Pottery of Sri Lanka is one of the traditional small industries. The pottery industry is distributed almost throughout the country and it has a long history and a tradition.

== History ==
The pottery of Sri Lanka has a very long history. There are pieces of evidence about the history of pottery in Sri Lanka that go back to the second century BC, via an unbroken tradition passed from one generation to other. Evidence from archaeological excavations at Anuradhapura Gedige and Kandarodai in Jaffna have found pottery items from the early historical period. Archaeological excavations done near Thissamaharamaya found many pottery items dated back to the second century BC. Certain finds were imported from other locales, thus proving that pottery items were a key item traded internationally in ancient Sri Lanka.

== Materials ==
Clays of various kinds are the main material that is used in the Sri Lankan pottery industry. There are main three types of clay that are used for pottery - red clay, white clay and ball clay. Clay is primarily sourced from Nattandiya, Dediyawela, Boralasgamuwa, and Meetiyagoda. Most traditional pottery villages are found near these clay deposits, however due to demand there are other villages outside these clay deposits. Due to large-scale use, clay has become a scarce resource in Sri Lanka, which has increased production costs.

=== Red clay ===
Red clay is commonly available in Sri Lanka and is usually found mixed with sand and grit. This clay is mainly used to make tile and bricks. If dirt is removed from the clay body, it is also used for pottery.

=== White clay ===
White clay is found in large deposits. It can not be used as raw material directly and needs to be mixed with other materials for use in the pottery industry. White clay is used to manufacture porcelain and ceramics.

=== Ball clay ===
Ball clay can be found in small deposits and is mainly composed of Kaolin. Boralesgamuwa and Mitiyagoda are the main areas with larger ball clay deposits.

== Techniques ==
The major techniques in use by most potters have remained the similar throughout history and are passed down through families. Earthenware clay is prepared by thoroughly mixing red clay and a small amount of black clay. Then the mixture is heaped and kept aside for about a month for seasoning. Then the broken heap is sliced by using a sliver of bamboo to remove dust and dirt. It is then kneaded and trampled while adding additional water, and kept for another day.

The traditional potters' wheel is called a 'Saka poruwa' (සක පෝරුව). This is a wheel roughly 2.5 feet in diameter. It is flexible to rotate and fixed firmly to the ground. The traditional wheel was rotated by the potters' wife or a child while the potter fashioned the pot. In the current era, most potters' wheels are driven by electric motors. The potter places a ball of clay at the centre of the wheel then while rotating the wheel, moulds it into a pot with both hands. This shape is then further refined and the mouth formed using the wheel. The pot is sliced from the wheel and removed using a small spoke. The rim is finished with a piece of cloth or rubber tubing. Further shaping and trimming are done. The pot is kept for another day to dry before finishing the bottom of the pot. The potter takes the pot in his left hand and a bat-shaped wooden tool in his right - the 'Walantalana Lalla' (වලං තලන ලෑල්ල) or 'Mati Aluwa' (මැටි අලුව). He then holds a round stone inside the pot near the bottom while shaping the pot externally by patting it with the Walantalana Lalla. The pot is then burnished smooth with the bat and decoration is added.

The potter makes a kiln to fire pots to the required temperature. This has a square-shaped enclosure and is built from bricks with a dome made of sticks and clay. The most common fuel materials are coconut husks and wood due to their ready availability. There are a few vents in the kiln to allow smoke to escape. Pots are stacked inside the kiln and first it is smoked for around two days. This process is called 'Dun gahanawa' (දුං ගහනවා). Then the temperature is gradually increased and the pots are fired for another one day to ensure pots are fired adequately, as otherwise many pots break when they are taken out from the kiln. After firing, the kiln is kept intact for about two days while the contents cool. Then the kiln is broken and the pots are taken out.

This is the traditional process of making a pot. There are some new techniques added. But still, most of the potters make their pots in a traditional way in Sri Lanka.

== Current status and new developments of the industry ==
Considering the current SME sector in Sri Lanka traditional pottery industry faces many challenges such as material scarcity and inadequate affordability. This sector still generates a low profit. Therefore, many people who are involved in the pottery industry face many socioeconomic issues. Lack of modern technology, inefficiency of production, and high rate of damage are some of the major problems they face.

In 2020, the government headed by president Gotabaya Rajapaksa made efforts to develop traditional industries including pottery. As an initiative new state ministry was formed as 'Clay, Cane, Brass, Furniture, and Rural Industry Promotion state ministry'. Under this ministry, it is expected to identify the problems in traditional industries and develop them as SMEs by giving short term and long-term solutions.
