= Ramanayake =

Ramanayake is a Sinhalese surname. Notable people with the surname include:

- Vijaya Ramanayake (1945–2016), Sri Lankan film producer, music producer, songwriter, journalist, author and the founder of Tharanga Music and Film
- Champaka Ramanayake (born 1965), Sri Lankan cricketer
- Ranjan Ramanayake (born 1963), Sri Lankan film actor, film director, singer and a writer and also a politician
