= Shirley Waijayantha =

Sri Lankan musician

Shirley Waijayantha ෂර්ලි වෛජයන්ත
- Born: Shirley Waijayantha Gunasinghe; Gampaha, Sri Lanka
- Education: Eriyawetiya Maha Vidyalaya
- Occupations: Singer,Lyricist,Musician, Music Instructor and Teacher
- Awards: Kalabhooshana
- Musical career
- Genres: Pop; soul; rhythm and blues; Indian classical music
- Years active: 1980–present
- Labels: Nilwala; Ransilu

Kalabhooshana Visharad Shirley Waijayantha (Sinhala: ෂර්ලි වෛජයන්ත) , is a Sri Lankan singer, musician, music instructor and music teacher. One of the founding members of Bellwood College of Music in Sri Lanka, Waijayantha has produced several leading singers to the Sri Lankan classical music industry in a career spanning more than four decades.

== Personal life ==
Waijayantha was born in Dalugama, Kelaniya, Sri Lanka. He was educated at Eeriyawetiya Maha Vidyalaya.

== Career ==
During school days, Waijayantha did not focus on music. However, he became an active member in many literary activities including singing and won many prizes. Later he started to study music under Visharad P. V. Nandasiri for his Advance Level examination and completed his Music Visharad exam. Soon after, Waijayantha made his first teaching appointment to Kelaniya Maha Vidyalaya. During this period, he was able to join with Sri Lanka Broadcasting Corporation (SLBC) and sang four songs for 'Sarala Gee' musical program.

However, with an intention to become a leading singer in the country, Waijayantha felt compelled to write his own songs and tunes. Then he launched his first cassette tape with the help of his friend Lionel Nawanage and his wife Sudharma Nawanage. In the album, he sang two duets with renowned singer Nanda Malini. Some of his legendary singles include: Aatha Sithijaye, Dasata Huruwu, Kawadada Aye Enne , Samawa Ithiriwa,Man Bolada Wiye , Mata Epa Obe Hasarel, Mata Sihinayak Wage and Mal Mal Hina. He also worked as the Leader of Youth Service Band for many years.

In the early 1980s, he joined the National Youth Service Council and was able to produce many fresh talents in the country including: Chandralekha Perera, Somasiri Medagedara and Chandrasena Hettiarachchi. In 2007, Waijayantha served as the Institute chief of Bellwood Aesthetic Institute, Kandy, as well as its deputy director. On 4 November 2007, he held a musical show titled 'Waijayantha Gee' at the BMICH after a lapse of 20 years. During the show, he launched the album titled "Ithin Kiyanna Aadare".

On 3 November 2021, he was bestowed with Kalabhooshana title at the 36th Kalabhooshana State Awards Ceremony.
