= Jagath Wickramasinghe =

Sri Lankan musician (born 1966)

Jagath Wickramasinghe ජගත් වික්‍රමසිංහ
- Born: 10 April 1966 (age 60); Kolonnawa, Sri Lanka
- Education: Ananda College; Anuradapura Central College
- Spouse: Gayani Prasangika Kohona (m. 2000)
- Children: 3
- Parents: Jinadasa Wickramasinghe (father); Aryawathi Chandralatha (mother)
- Musical career
- Genres: Pop; soul; rhythm and blues; Indian classical music
- Instruments: Vocals, guitar, tabla, sitar, violin and flute
- Years active: 1983–present
- Labels: Nilwala; Ransilu

Jagath Wickramasinghe (Sinhala: ජගත් වික්‍රමසිංහ; born 10 April 1966) is a Sri Lankan musician. He is the former Chairman of Sri Lanka Broadcasting Corporation.

Wickramasinghe pursued a career as an engineer, but later decided to become a musician like his parents. His career took off after his songs were played on stations owned by the Sri Lanka Broadcasting Corporation.

He is one of the first three judges on Sirasa Superstar for season 1 to 3.

== Personal life ==
He was born on 10 April 1966 in Kolonnawa. His father L.K Jinadasa Wickramasinghe and mother Aryawathi Chandralatha both were music teachers. His parents were largely involved with many of musical programs in Sri Lanka. Therefore, he used to practice sing and play whatever his parents did during their rehearsals. It is during those days his potential of singing and playing instruments were discovered by his parents.

In 1972, he was studying at Ashoka Kanishta Vidyalaya, Maradana and after passing the grade 5 scholarship, he attended Ananda College and studied there up to grade 10. Then he had to study at Anuradhapura Central College as his parents had got an unexpected transfer to Anuradapura. In the school, he was engineering oriented and studied mathematics for G.C.E A/Ls. Later on he followed a civil engineering course and specialised in building construction.

Wickramasinghe fulfilled his music knowledge following Sangeeth Visharada Part 2 and Diploma in music (vocal), Bathkande institute of music, Lucknow, India. As well, he did Prathama Examination Music (Instrumental) Thabla, at Bathkande institute of music. He was student of western music Trinity College of London.

In the year 2000, he got married with Gayani Kohona and is the father of one son and two daughters.

== Musical career ==
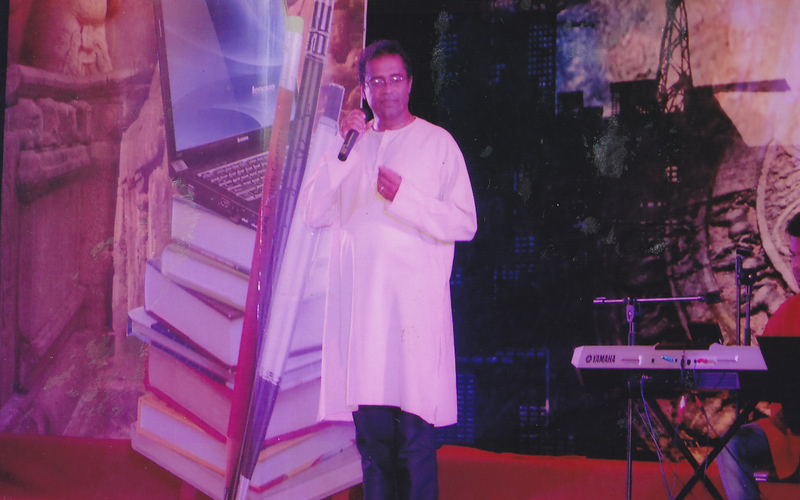

During the first half of the 1990s he forwarded an application to the music section of SLBC. He got selected as music producer and he played instruments for programs and composed his own music. He made many contributions to new creations and got much experience as a young musician. Then he worked as a visiting lecture of university of visual & performing and was a lecture in oriental and western music, in the music department of the youth service council Sri Lanka.

From 1983 to 1985 he performed as a music consultant of "Sarvodaya Organization" and since 1982 to up to now he is performing as a teacher with having experience in music. Since 1991 up to now, he has been touring to around 40 countries performing there as a vocalist, instrumentalist and a director of music. As well, he takes special care to promote our music and culture in foreign countries. His first solo song is Ran Tharakavan composed by himself.

In 1990, he participated in an international singing competition and as a best singer of Sri Lanka he represented Abu Golden Kite World Song festival in Malaysia. In the mid 1990s he attached program on TV such as Prathiba, Ridma Tharanga, Shantha Me Ra Yame, Thani Tharuwe, and Nishanthaya. As well, he composed music for films and teledramas such as Sthyadevi, Re Ru, Bhawa Karma, Thunpath Rela, Bopath Ella, Isuru Tharanaya, Pahe Kalliya, Keetaya and Awasan Horaawa.

In 1991, he involved as an actor in few television serials such as Kande Gedara, Doo Daruwo, Devi, Shoba saha Darshana, Piya Satahan, Awasan Horawa, Soorya Sihinaya, Athugala Pamula, Shapa Nokaraw Daruwane, and Sasala Ruwa. In 1994, 1995, 1996 he was awarded by Sarasavi film festival and he invited to perform opera called Siddartha at the annual Sai Baba Festival in India representing Sri Lanka as its music composer, arranger, singer and performer In 1995 he was awarded presidential award as a most popular pop music artist (western). In 1998 he won the award for Best young music director and Best teledrama singer at Sumathi Awards.

With his experience he held numerous shows both in Sri Lanka and abroad for local and foreign artists and he was assigned to direct the music for 40 Japanese children named Harajuku vocal orchestra. In 1998, he released the first music VCD in Sri Lanka called Thani Tharuwa, and alongwith Maestro K. M. Rathnapala, was a pioneer in national school talent management.

He worked as a judge in Sirasa Superstar in 2004, 2006, 2008, and then with "Derana London Star" from 2008 to 2010. Then in 2011, he worked as judge in Rupawahini Ranawiru Real Star, Thurunu Shakthi, Ceylonta, TNL Star, Rupawaahini Gee Muthu 2007 to 2012, ITN Supiri Hapana 2013. In 2005 he won Bunka Award from Japan as well as Sri Lankan western music award as a best DUO Performance and best instrumentalist. As well he awarded as a best singer of 2008 at Raigam Tele'es.
