= Re Ru =

Re Ru රෑ රූ
- Directed by: Jayasekara Aponso
- Written by: Jayasekara Aponso
- Produced by: Jayasekara Aponso
- Starring: Jayasekara Aponso; Dilhani Ekanayake; Avanthi Aponso
- Cinematography: Bandula Cooray
- Edited by: Elmo Halliday
- Music by: D.D Gunasena
- Release date: 19 February 1999
- Country: Sri Lanka
- Language: Sinhala

Re Ru (Sinhala: රෑ රූ) is a 1999 Sri Lankan Sinhala comedy drama film directed and produced by Jayasekara Aponso. It stars Jayasekara Aponso and Dilhani Ekanayake in lead roles along with Avanthi Aponso and Bandula Vithanage. Music composed by D.D Gunasena. It is the 909th Sri Lankan film in the Sinhala cinema.

== Cast ==
- Jayasekara Aponso
- Dilhani Ekanayake as Kumari
- Avanthi Aponso
- Gamini Aponso
- Dammika Aponso
- Bandula Vithanage
- Thilak Kumara Rathnayake

== Soundtrack ==
The soundtrack was composed by D. D. Gunasena. Milton Mallawarachchi provided playback vocals for the film. The recordings were made before his death in 1998, while Re Ru was released in 1999.

No.	Title	Singer(s)	Length
1.	"Sudu Sela Muthumala Palada"	Damayanthi Jayasuriya, Milton Mallawarachchi
2.	"Raga Raga"	Milton Mallawarachchi
3.	"Nil Ahase Tharu Piyase (female version)"	Nirosha Virajini
4.	"Nil Ahase Tharu Piyase (male version)"	Milton Mallawarachchi
