= Night Rider (2022 film) =

2022 Sri Lankan film

- Sinhala: නයිට් රයිඩර්
- Directed by: Kasun Pathirana
- Written by: Kasun Pathirana; Srinath Chaturanga
- Produced by: Kasun Pathirana
- Starring: Kalana Gunasekara; Yureni Noshika; W. Jayasiri; Mahendra Perera
- Cinematography: Vishwa Karunaratne
- Edited by: Lakruwan De Seram
- Music by: Ajith Kumarasiri
- Release date: July 29, 2022
- Country: Sri Lanka
- Language: Sinhala

Night Rider (Sinhala: නයිට් රයිඩර්) is a 2022 Sri Lankan Sinhala thriller film directed and produced by Kasun Pathirana in his directorial debut. The film stars Kalana Gunasekara and Yureni Noshika in lead roles, whereas W. Jayasiri and Mahendra Perera made supportive roles. The theme of the film revolves around a series of unexpected events that a taxi driver in Colombo has to face when a journalist gets into his car and a political mob follows her, and this taxi driver has to face many unexpected events to protect her from the political gang.

== Cast ==
- Kalana Gunasekara as Malinda Nuwan
- Yureni Noshika as Shani Sooriyabandara
- W. Jayasiri as Hotel receptionist
- Mahendra Perera as Secret gang leader
- Ananda Kumaraunnehe as Gas station worker
- Damayanthi Fonseka as Malinda's mother
- Thumindu Dodantenna as Room boy
- Bimal Jayakodi as Program host
- Aruni Mendis as Malinda's fiancee

== Production ==
The story, dialogues, screenplay, production and direction of the film are done by Kasun Pathirana and Co-produced by Srinath Chaturanga. The assistant director is Chamara Selara, camera director is Vishwa Karunaratne, editor is Lakruwan De Seram, art director is Charith Wickramathilaka and makeup by Shalitha Gunawardena. Ajith Kumarasiri worked as the music director, Malinda Sampath for color mixing, Asha Rajapaksa for sound administration, Charith Gamlath for costume design, Osanda Saman Bandara for stunt direction, Dimuthu Rupasingha for computer visual design, Ronit Adhikari for line production, Taridu Deshapriya for production management.

Most of the scenes in the film are based on the events of the night and the screenplay of the film runs along a chain of events that take place in a uniform 24 hours. For that reason, the production team led by the director has had to shoot the film continuously for many nights.

== Screening ==
Although several years have passed since the completion of the production, the producers have not got a chance to release the film for a wide theatrical release. Instead, they organized several private screenings here at various places for a limited audience. The film was screened under the Cinema of Tomorrow category at the Derana Film Awards in 2019.

The film was initially planned to screen on 22 July 2022, but was later shifted to 29 July 2022. The media and premiere was held on the 22 July 2022 at the Dematagoda Regal Cinema under the participation of veteran actor W. Jayasiri and its main actors Kalana Gunasekara and Yureni Noshika.
