= Ajith Bandara =

Sri Lankan singer

Ajith Bandara අජිත් බණ්ඩාර
- Born: Polpithigama, Sri Lanka
- Education: Pothubowa Vidyalaya
- Occupation: Singer
- Spouse: Niluka Bandara
- Children: 2
- Musical career
- Genres: Pop; soul; rhythm and blues; Indian classical music
- Instrument: Vocals
- Years active: 2006–present
- Labels: Nilwala; MEntertainment

Ajith Bandara (Sinhala: අජිත් බණ්ඩාර) is a Sri Lankan singer. He is the winner of the first season of the singing reality competition Sirasa Superstar in 2006.

== Personal life ==
He is from Ahasyanapitiya, Mawathagama, in Kurunegala District and the second child of his family. His father, who was a carpenter, died after a chest pain when he was a teenager. He has two brothers and three sisters. Before entering singing, he worked as a woodcarver and polisher at Bandara Weerakone Furnishers at Mawathagama. He completed his education at Pothubowa Vidyalaya in Mawathagama.

He is married to Niluka Bandara and they have two children. His daughter, Sathsari Chanchala, became the champion of the reality show Hiru Super Hero in 2017.

== Singing career ==
He started singing at a young age., but his poor family status kept him away from popular singing. Then he joined a group called Flowers. In 2005, his wife sent an application for Sirasa Superstar, Sri Lanka's first singing reality competition. His first audition was in Habarana. He gradually moved through the competition and eventually was the winner. He received one million LKR, a prize car and free sponsorship for a first album. Soon after winning the competition, he released his first music album, Thilaka Thiyanna, which was launched at the Sugathadasa Indoor Stadium in Colombo.

After the competition, he had several popular hits, including "Sudu Hansiye", "Duwillen Thilaka Thiyanna", "Oba Innawanam", "Seetha Handekare" and "Aradhanawak Kalado". He made a duet, "Bandara Aiye", with Shanika Madumali, the season 3 winner of Sirasa Superstar. In 2017, he released the solo "Mage Santhake". In 2018, he released the song "Heena Yaya Pura" after a year silence.

== Thilaka Thiyanna ==
Track listing

No.	Title	Length
1.	"Amma" (album version)	3:23
2.	"Asipiya Salana Nisa" (album version)	4:02
3.	"Heen Manike" (album version)
4.	"Mage Nage" (album version)	3:23
5.	"Mage Sithata Muva Vemin" (album version)	4:01
6.	"Mata Enna Nodi" (album version)	3:49
7.	"Oba Innavanam Inna Ma Langa" (album version)	3:44
8.	"Parasathu Mal Pipila" (album version)	3:36
9.	"Rea Sandalia" (album version)
10.	"Seetha Handeakare" (His first music video made for this song)	3:59
11.	"Sewwandiye" (album version)	4:26
12.	"Sihineka Sitha Davatee" (album version)	4:26
13.	"Sudu Hansiye Mihiraviye" (album version)	4:59
14.	"Tharuka Niva" (album version)	3:46
15.	"Thilaka Thiyanna" (sung with fellow Superstar contestants usually)	3:36
16.	"Vilak Nelum Mal Aragena" (album version)
