= Piyabanna Ayeth =

2022 Sri Lankan film

- Sinhala: පියාඹන්න ආයෙත්
- Directed by: Shirley Samarasinghe
- Written by: Udara Palliyaguru
- Produced by: Udara Palliyaguru
- Starring: Kalana Gunasekara; Chamatka Lakmini; Kalpa Munasinghe; Pokurumali Fernando
- Cinematography: Gayan Geethapriya
- Edited by: Niroda Veranga
- Music by: Sachini Katuwawala
- Production company: D Cinema
- Distributed by: Guththila Films
- Release date: 9 September 2022
- Country: Sri Lanka
- Language: Sinhala

Piyabanna Ayeth (Fly Once More) (Sinhala: පියාඹන්න ආයෙත්) is a 2022 Sri Lankan Sinhala romantic road film directed by Shirley Samarasinghe in his directorial debut and produced by Udara Palliyaguru for Guththila Films and D Cinema. The film stars Kalana Gunasekara and Chamatka Lakmini in lead roles, whereas Kalpa Munasinghe, Pokurumali Fernando, Marcus Fernando, and child actress Pahandi Nethara made supportive roles.

== Plot ==
The film revolves around the tour of Sadisha and Nilantha and how Nilantha influence on Sadesha's life.

== Cast ==
- Chamathka Lakmini as Sadisha
- Kalana Gunasekara as Nilantha
- Kalpa Munasinghe as Adisha
- Pokurumali Fernando as Nilantha's wife
- Marcus Fernando
- Pahandi Nethara as Nilantha's daughter
- Sahansa Dihansi

== Production ==
The film marked the first feature film direction by Shirley Samarasinghe, who has awarded as a director of short films and documentaries. Samarasinghe has gained professional experience by participating in various films as an assistant director and production manager while studying the diploma course of the National Film Corporation. There are two main roles which are played by Kalana Gunasekara and Chamatka Lakmini. Two more small children were used to highlight a cinematic experience that can be watched by the whole family that gives a fresh interpretation of love.

The production crew started filming in Tangalle to capture the beauty of Sri Lanka. After that, it was filmed in Ampara, Anuradhapura, Jaffna, Kurunegala, Nuwara Eliya, Colombo and Kandy. The film contains three songs where the main theme was an aesthetic journey through which their lives flow. But in the bottom line, the happiness, pain, breakdowns and new hopes in life are all contained.

== Screening ==
The media screening of the film was held at the Colombo City Center Cinema in April 2022. The trailer was released online in May 2022.
