= Abeywardena Balasuriya =

Sri Lankan musician (1947–2010)

- අබේවර්ධන බාලසූරිය
- Born: March 9, 1947; Chilaw, Sri Lanka
- Died: March 26, 2010 (aged 63); Colombo, Sri Lanka
- Other name: Chooti Ralahamy
- Education: St. Mary's College, Chilaw
- Occupations: Singer; composer; writer; program producer
- Spouse: Niranjala Sarojini
- Relatives: Sanath Nandasiri (brother-in-law); Malkanthi Nandasiri (sister-in-law); Nirmala Ranatunga (sister-in-law); Wijeratne Ranatunga (brother-in-law); Manoj Peiris (brother-in-law); Sakunthala Peiris (sister-in-law); Sewwandi Ranathunga (cousin daughter); Anuradha Nandasiri (cousin daughter)
- Musical career
- Genres: Pop; soul; rhythm and blues; Classical music
- Instrument: Vocals
- Years active: 1963–2008
- Labels: HMV; Nilwala; Torana; Ransilu

Abeywardena Balasuriya (9 March 1945 – 26 March 2010 Sinhala: අබේවර්ධන බාලසූරිය), was a Sri Lankan musician, playback singer, writer and a television program producer. An A-grade singer with a career spanned more than three decades, Abeywardena made a vital contribution to the music field of Sri Lanka.

== Personal life ==
He was born on 9 March 1947 in Mugunuwatawana, Chilaw, Sri Lanka. He completed education from St. Mary's College, Chilaw. His father, Kandappuhami was a harmonium player. In mid 1960s, he worked in the Air Force. When the job became a barrier to the singing career, he left the army and joined the Paddy Marketing Board as a technical officer.

He was married to a fellow singer, Niranjala Sarojani. He met Niranjala while singing in for Sri Lanka Broadcasting Corporation’s (SLBC) "Upuli" album. Niranjala is the younger sister of veteran songstress Malkanthi Nandasiri. Malkanthi is married to Prof. Sanath Nandasiri, an icon in Sri Lankan music. Some of the other popular members of the family include, Nirmala Ranatunga, Kumar Pieirs, Manoj Peiris, and Sakunthala Peiris. Sakunthala worked at Veritas Radio in Manila. Manoj Peiris is a renowned tabla player and musician of Sri Lanka. Nirmala Ranatunga is also a singer who was married to late Wijeratne Ranatunga, a prominent tabla player. Nirmala's daughter Sewwandi Ranathunga is also a singer.

In his late years, he had a nervous breakdown and had difficulty speaking. He died on 26 March 2010 at the age of 63 while receiving treatment in ICU at the Colombo National hospital. His remains laid at his residence at No. 38, Yahampath Mawatha, Maharagama. The funeral took place at the Borella cemetery at 4 p.m. on 31 March 2010. With the demise of Abeywardena, his wife Niranjala has also retired from singing.

== Career ==
He started his music career as a vocalist at Sarasvathi Mandapaya. On 29 January 1963, he passed the singing examination conducted by Navaka Mandala program under the guidance of Amara Bandu Rupasinghe and Elmo Fernando. However, in the meantime, his father was died and halted musical career. Then in 1966, he joined SLBC and became an A grade singer. He participated his first radio program, Nevum Mihira. In the program, he sang his first solo, "Kavurudo Kavurudo". Since then, he voiced several popular songs for the lyrics made by Sunil Ariyaratne, Ajantha Ranasinghe and Premakeerthi de Alwis. He also participated in many radio musical programs such as Swarna Varna, Swarna Rangana, Miyarasa Vindana, Nurthi Gee and Prabuddha Gee.

In 1976 he became a playback singer with the film Madol Duwa. In the same year, he sang the popular duet "Bonda Meedum Kanduralle" with Sujatha Aththanayaka for the film Duhulu Malak. He later sang the song "Isuru Devindu" in the film Sarungale as well as in the films Chuda Manikyaya, Baba Ketu Hati and Sandakada Pahana. Apart from that, he also provided articles for newspapers. His song "Piyanani Ma Nawatha Upannoth" is a song that has been firmly established in the field of Sinhala music. Some of his other popular hits include: "Anurādhapuraya Obayi", "Man Næthidā Mē Raṭa", "Avasan Husma Poda", "Bhavayen Bhavē", "Oba Maṭa Mal Kækulaki" (with Nanda Malini), "Malavungē Nagarayē" (with Nalani Ranasinghe), "Vælibath Ivvā Matakayi" (with Indrani Perera), "Nohan̆ḍan Sūriya Kānthā" (with Indrani Bogoda), "Kumbuke Liden" (with Nirmala Ranatunga), and "Kīra Palā Dalu" (with Chandrika Siriwardena).

Meanwhile, he attained a scholarship to Germany. In 1982, when Sri Lanka Rupavahini Corporation was established, M.J. Perera who was the Chairman of the Rupavahini invited Abeywardena to produce the musical program Nandana Vindana. Then he became the director and producer of the show. The program became very popular among the public and one of the iconic musical programs in Sri Lanka. Then in 1985, he produced the program Anduna where the program won the Vijiya Rupavahini Sammana Award for the best television program in 1987. Apart from that, Abeywardena took part in the International Record and Music Publishing Market fiesta representing the television.

In 1991, he released his first music album Kalpana Lova. Then he released three more albums in the following years: Ran Reka (1994), Anuradhapuraya Obai (1996) and Sunflowers Samaga Abey (1999). Also along with his wife, twelve CDs titled "Abey-Niranjala Vishista Gee" have also been launched. In 2006, he performed his maiden musical concert 'Tira'. After the popularity of the concert, he toured across the island as well as many foreign countries.

== Legacy ==
To commemorate the 66th birth anniversary of the Abeywardena Balasooriya, a musical show titled "Thun Path Rata" was held on 9 March 2011 at 6 pm at John de Silva theatre. During the show, a CD comprises 20 tracks, titled "Apa Gayu Prem Ge Gee" sung Abeywardena-Niranjala was launched. On 12 July 2013, the patriotic song series sung by the Abeywardena and Niranjala was released under the name "Ran Divaina" at 4.00 pm at the Sri Lanka Foundation Institute. It is the first time that a duo has released a CD of sixteen patriotic songs. The song collection was to be released in 2008 for the 60th Independence Diamond Jubilee, but they could not finish the job as Abeywardena got sick.

== Filmography ==
Year	Film	Role	Ref.
1976	Madol Duwa	Playback Singer	
1976	Duhulu Malak	Playback Singer	
1976	Asha	Playback Singer	
1977	Hariyanakota Ohama Thamai	Playback Singer	
1978	Veera Puran Appu	Playback Singer	
1978	Anupama	Playback Singer	
1979	Sarungale	Playback Singer	
1979	Chuda Manikya	Playback Singer	
1980	Kanchana	Playback Singer	
1980	Seetha	Playback Singer	
1980	Kinduru Kumari	Playback Singer	
1981	Sayuru Thera	Playback Singer	
1981	Valampuri	Playback Singer	
1981	Bamba Ketu Hati	Playback Singer	
1982	Sandaa	Playback Singer	
1983	Subodha	Playback Singer	
1994	Sahodariyakage Kathawa	Playback Singer	
1987	Podi Vijay	Playback Singer	
1988	Sandakada Pahana	Playback Singer	
