= Vijaya Ramanayake =

- Also known as: Vijay Ramanayake, Vijaya Ramanayaka
- Born: Wijasiri Prathapasinghe Ramanayake; 1 April 1945; Matara, Sri Lanka
- Died: 26 October 2016 (aged 71) Colombo, Sri Lanka
- Occupations: film producer, music producer, songwriter, journalist, author
- Label: Tharanga

Vijaya Ramanayake (Sinhala: විජය රාමනායක ; 1 April 1945 – 26 October 2016) is a Sri Lankan film and music producer, songwriter, journalist and author. He was the founder and producer of Tharanga Music and Film. Ramanayake was the first to introduce compact cassette tapes to Sri Lanka.

== Early life ==
Vijaya Ramanayake was born 1 April 1945 in Matara, Sri Lanka to Don Deonis Ramanayake (Dondra Head Lighthousekeeper) and Dona Coraneliya Wimala. In his late teens, Ramanayake came to Colombo and worked as an advertising canvasser for the Lakehouse newspaper organisation and then as a journalist. Ramanayake authored two books, one of which is a children's book.

== Career ==
=== Music ===
In 1978, Ramanayake began Tharanga Records, and quickly dominated the music market. He produced music for several popular Sri Lankan musicians including W. D. Amaradeva, Clarence Wijewardena, Vijaya Kumarathunge, Milton Perera and Neela Wickramasinghe. Under the Tharanga label he released Sri Lanka's first audio cassette; Milton Mallawarachchi's Anytime, Anywhere. In the late 1970s and 1980s many of the country's top hits were produced and in some cases even written by Ramanayake. The countries key classical music titles are owned and distributed under the Tharanga label.

=== Film ===
In the early 1980s Ramanayake expanded the Tharanga label into production and distribution of popular feature films in Sri Lanka.

His first film in 1981 Aradhana (Invitation) is a tale of love, separation and reconciliation, directed by Wijaya Dharmasri and featuring Malani Fonseka, Ravindra Randeniya, Anoja Weerasinghe and Ramanayake's then 3-year-old son Tharanga. The film was both a critical and a popular success.

Gamperaliya is a 1963 film adapted for screen from the first part of a trilogy of novels by Martin Wickramasinghe. The film was internationally acclaimed, winning numerous awards and screened at the Cannes Film festival. Ramanayake continued the production of part two and three in the trilogy, Kaliyugaya (Age of Darkness) 1982, and in Yuganthaya (End Of An Era) 1983. All three films were directed by Lester James Peries and starred Gamini Fonseka. The trilogy was widely popular.

In 1987 Ramanayake produced Maldeniye Simion, for which he won a Sarasaviya Award for 'Best Picture'. The film also earned a Silver Peacock Award at the International Film Festival of India.

In the late 1980s, Ramanayake purchased the rights and ownership of Ranmuthu Duwaa, a film made in 1962 by British director Mike Wilson and financed by Arthur C. Clarke. The asset is a landmark of Sri Lankan cinema, it is extremely popular and also the first colour film in the country. The film was one of Ramanayake's favourites growing up, he took great pride in having it under his banner.

=== Finance ===
In the late 1980s Ramanayake branched into the finance world with several other partners and created Tharanga Investments Ltd. The company ran a public bus service, imported vehicles for sale and invested in a number of other projects throughout the country and in Singapore. This venture was short lived and was unsuccessful.

== Later life ==
In 1988 Ramanayake moved to Canada. While there, he produced a Sri Lankan radio program, put on concerts by popular Sri Lankan artists and screened a number of Sri Lankan theatrical releases in Toronto.

Ramanayake returned to Sri Lanka in the late 1990s and successfully relaunched his Tharanga record store. A number of stores were in various shopping districts within Colombo.

Ramanayake became terminally ill with cancer at the age of 71. He died 4 months after his diagnosis on 26 October 2016.
