= Rookantha Gunathilake =

Sri Lankan musician (born 1959)

Rookantha Goonatillake (රූකාන්ත ගුණතිලක)
- Born: Mario Glory Rookantha Goonatillake; 5 September 1959 (age 67); Kegalle, Sri Lanka
- Other name: Rooka
- Education: St. Mary's College, Kegalle St. Anthony’s College, Kandy
- Occupations: singer, songwriter
- Spouse: Chandralekha Perera
- Children: Raini Charuka; Windy Goonatillake

Mario Glory Rookantha Goonatillake (born 5 September 1959: Sinhala: රූකාන්ත ගුණතිලක) is a Sri Lankan singer, musician, and songwriter. Known for his innovative contributions to Sri Lankan pop music, he rose to prominence in the late 1980s.

Rookantha’s career was disrupted in 2000 when he and his wife, Chandralekha Perera, were subjected to politically motivated harassment under the administration of then-President Chandrika Kumaratunga. Following the attack, the family relocated to the United States, where they continued to focus on their music careers. In 2018, Rookantha returned to Sri Lanka and resumed his role as a key figure in the music industry.

He is known for his contributions to Sri Lankan pop and sentimental music, with a repertoire that includes over 200 songs and a lasting impact on the country’s music scene. Rookantha frequently collaborates with his wife and daughters, Raini Charuka and Windy Goonatillake, who have also pursued careers in music.

== Personal life ==
Mario Glory Rookantha Goonatillake was born on 5 September 1959 in Kegalle, Sri Lanka, into a middle-class family. From a young age, he displayed a passion for music, leading his parents to arrange piano lessons with a local music teacher. He attended St. Mary's College, Kegalle for his primary education and later studied at St. Anthony's College, Kandy, where he learned music under distinguished musicians like Stanley Peiris and Cyril Brown. Despite entering the music industry early, Rookantha successfully completed his G.C.E. Advanced Levels.

He is married to singer and former actress Chandralekha Perera. The couple has two daughters: Raini Charuka (born 10 April 1991), who is also a prominent singer, and Windy (born 26 December).

== Musical career ==
Rookantha began his career in 1976 as a composer. However, in 1985, when a vocalist was unavailable for one of his compositions, "Bambara Pahasa," he provided the vocals himself, marking the start of his journey as a singer. The track later became part of the "Bambara Pahasa" cassette, released on 31 October 1988. His fourth album, Charuka, released in 1997, was named after his daughter Raini Charuka.

Rookantha also contributed to Jaliya Ranatunga's collection of 12 songs, composing music for two tracks.

His most iconic concert series, Ru Sanda Rae (translated as "Beauty Moon Night"), debuted in February 1993 at the Elphinstone Theatre in Colombo. To date, this concert series has been staged over 300 times worldwide, including in Italy, France, Denmark, Sweden, Germany, Australia, New Zealand, Canada, the UK, the USA, and the UAE. Another major event, Rookantha-Chandralekha Live at Stadium, attracted over 15,000 attendees at the Sugathadasa Stadium in August 2009, with tickets selling out weeks in advance.

In 2019, Rookantha served as a judge on the television reality show Hiru Star.

== Political Harassment ==
On 26 January 2000, Rookantha and Chandralekha were attacked by members of former President Chandrika Kumaratunga’s security forces. The attackers cut off their hair, poured petrol on their bodies, and looted their belongings. Following a legal trial, the perpetrators were convicted, and the Panadura High Court sentenced them to four-and-a-half years in prison in 2013. Despite the incident, Rookantha forgave the perpetrators, which contributed to the granting of a presidential pardon by President Mahinda Rajapaksa in 2014, leading to their release. After the attack, Rookantha and his family relocated to the United States.

== Political career ==
Rookantha returned to Sri Lanka in 2018 with ambitions to enter politics. In 2019, he was appointed the Dambadeniya electorate organiser for the United National Party.

== Singles ==
Solo Tracks
No.	Title	Length
1.	"Hitha Nawathuna Thana"
2.	"Sangawanna oya nil nuwan"
3.	"Kalakata passe"
4.	"Upaharaya" (Produced for ICC Cricket World Cup 2011)
5.	"Dura Atha"
6.	"Ithin Hadamu Api Aluth Ratak (Let's Make A New Country)" (Produced with Kasun Kalhara for the victory of New Democratic Front (Sri Lanka) at the 2015 Sri Lankan presidential election)
