= Nattandiya =

Coordinates: 7°25′N 79°52′E

Nattandiya නාත්තන්ඩිය
- Town
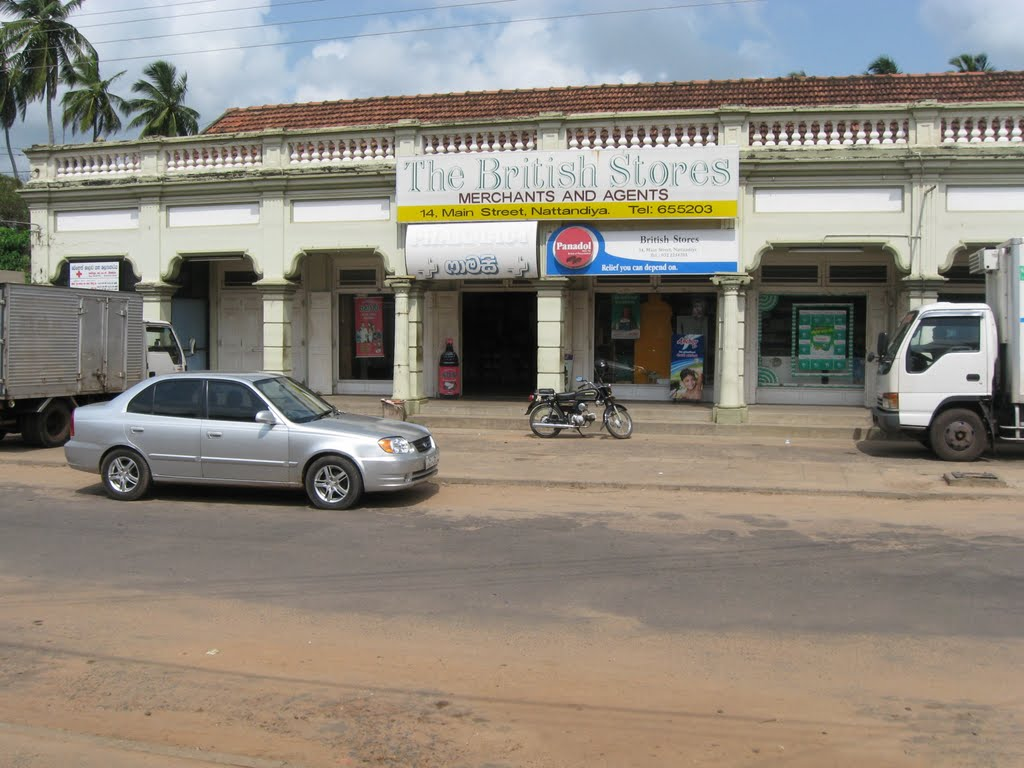
- Interactive map of Nattandiya
- Country: Sri Lanka
- Province: North Western Province
- District: Puttalam District

Population
  - Total: 10,000
- Time zone: UTC+5:30 (Sri Lanka Standard Time)
- Postal Code: 61190

Nattandiya (Sinhala: නාත්තන්ඩිය) is a town, situated in the Puttalam District, of North Western Province, Sri Lanka. The town is located 25 km (16 mi) away from Negombo, on Colombo-Negombo-Kuliyapitiya main road.

== Infrastructure ==
=== Education ===
- Dhammissara National School
- Lourdes College
- President national school
- Zahira Muslim School
