= Sanath Nandasiri =

Sri Lankan musician (1942–2023)

Sanath Nandasiri සනත් නන්දසිරි
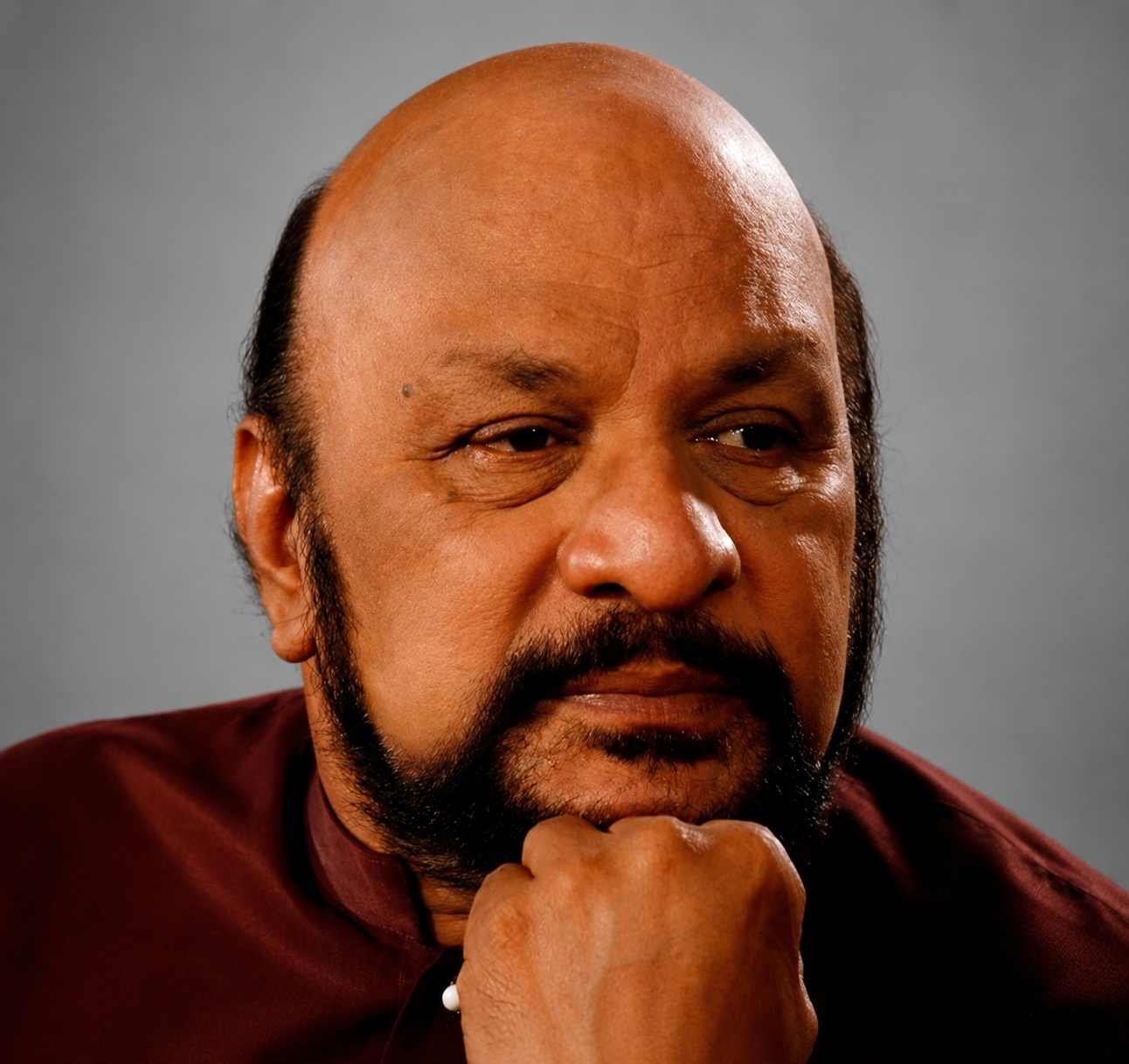
- Born: Herath Mudiyanselage Sanath Nandasiri; 15 February 1942; Gothatuwa, British Ceylon
- Died: 28 March 2023 (aged 81); Colombo, Sri Lanka
- Education: Gothatuwa Maha Vidyalaya; St. Matthew's College; Mahabodhi Maha Vidyalaya
- Alma mater: Bhatkhande Music Institute
- Occupations: Singer, musician Chancellor of the University of the Visual and Performing Arts
- Relatives: Abeywardena Balasuriya (brother-in-law)
- Musical career
- Genres: Pop; soul; rhythm and blues; Indian classical music
- Instruments: Vocals, harmonium, violin
- Years active: 1955–2023
- Labels: Gemtone; Singlanka; Vijitha; Nilwala; Ransilu

Sangeeth Nipun Herath Mudiyanselage Sanath Nandasiri (15 February 1942–28 March 2023) was a Sri Lankan singer, musician, music director, composer and playback singer. He was the chancellor of the University of the Visual and Performing Arts in Sri Lanka. One of the iconic singers in Sri Lankan music, Nandasiri received several awards for his compositions in a career spanned more than six decades. He also composed the music to Sandamalige Kathawa, the first TV serial on Rupawahini.

== Personal life and family background ==
Nandasiri was born on 15 February 1942 in Gothatuwa, Sri Lanka, as the third child to businessman and building contractor, H. M. William Perera and Dona Amalin Katugampola, a housewife. He completed his primary education from Gothatuwa Maha Vidyalaya and St. Matthew's College, Dematagoda for O/Ls. Then he attended Mahabodhi Maha Vidyalaya for Advanced Level and finally Stafford College to study English. During school times, he excelled as an athlete as well as a Elle player. He was a good short-distance runner and won trophies in the 100 meters. Nandasiri has one elder sister, one elder brother, one younger sister and one younger brother, Nimal Chandrasiri.

Nandasiri married singer Malkanthi Nandasiri née Peiris on 18 December 1971. He met Malkanthi during a vesak drama called 'Mara Parajaya' in 1967. They collaborated on songs before and after their marriage. When their son was born in 1971, he was a normal overweight child and put the name, Sanjaya Madhava. But the son died after three days. Their second child was a daughter, Nishamani Anuradha who was born 14 February 1974. Anuradha, also a musician, is currently back in Sri Lanka with her husband.

Born as the eldest daughter, Malkanthi has three sisters: Nirmala, Niranjala, Sakunthala and two brothers: Kumar, and Manoj. Nirmala Ranatunga is also a singer who was married to a prominent tabla player Wijeratne Ranatunga. Nirmala's daughter Sewwandi Ranathunga is also a singer. Nirajala Sarojani is also a singer who was married to late musician Abeywardena Balasuriya who died on 26 March 2010 at the age of 63. With the demise of Abeywardena, Niranjala has also retired from singing. Sakunthala worked at Veritas Radio in Manila. Manoj Peiris is a renowned tabla player and musician of Sri Lanka.

Sanath Nandasiri died at his residence in Colombo, on 28 March 2023, at the age of 81.

== Career ==
Nandasiri first appeared on Sinhala Radio at the age of 13 in 1955. During this period, he got the opportunity to work with Madawala S. Ratnayake, Nanda Jayamanne, Karunaratne Abeysekera and Sanath Wimalaweera. At the age of 17, he began studying the tabla instrument under D. R. Peiris soon after, where he was Peiris' first student at this class held at the YMBA Hall in Borella. He connected Nandasiri to his various radio and outdoor programs and got to participate in radio folk singing programs once a month. In 1960 at the age of 19, Nandasiri travelled to India to continue his studies at Bhatkhande Music Institute Deemed University. His teachers at the academy included Ustad Ahmed Jan Thirakwa, G. N. Nattu, Ustad Mokshut Ali, Pandit Hari Shankar Misra and Ustad Rahimmuddeen Khan Daga. While in India, Nandasiri composed several songs that appeared on Lucknow radio.

In 1965, he returned to Sri Lanka and joined the radio and started singing career. He was selected for the Government College of Music and was teaching at Uhana Maha Vidyalaya in Ampara on 7 September 1967. Then he applied for the position of University Lecturer, but did not call for the interview. However in 1974 with the help of I. M. R. A. Iriyagolle, Nandasiri joined the staff of University of Kelaniya as a lecturer. Nandasiri served as the head of music at the university from 1988 to 1992. Nandasiri took the Part I examination in vocal music and obtained first class at the "Nipun" examination in 1992 becoming the first Sri Lankan to achieve this task.

In 1972, Nandasiri recorded the song Mahada Veena which was included in the Soorya album titled 'Songs and Rhythms of Sri Lanka'. Further he recorded "Sanda Balanna" and "Gamey Kopi Kade" composed by Premasiri Khemadasa in the 70s which were well received and popular. In 1974, Nandasiri launched his first solo concert 'Swarna Kundala' which was later performed for more than 250 concerts. In 1979, he recorded his first full album with the same title of his concert "Swarna Kundala" for Gemtone. This included his popular songs "Kisiwak Nokiyana" and "Egodaha Kandey". After that he recorded three major albums for Singlanka 1980 and 1981 which included some of his best known songs such as "Eka Yayata Mal" and "Mama Nam Asayi". In addition, he has recorded songs for films most notably under the music direction of Premasiri Khemadasa.

After the birth of his daughter, he started a song concert called 'Anuradha' in 1982. Malkanthi Nandasiri also sang with him at the concert. In 1998, he started a formal education center 'Gandhari' to teach music. The institute offers singing and tabla playing related to the first and middle scholar examinations conducted annually by the Bhatkhande College of Music, India as well as music related to school syllabus up to grades 6–11.

In 2015, Nandasiri launched the 'Prathama Wasanthayai' concert where his daughter Anuradha also sang with Malkanthi Nandasiri. On 11 March 2018, the concert titled 'Du Anuradha' was held at 6.30 pm at Nelum Pokuna Theater. He was appointed Chancellor of the University of the Visual and Performing Arts in 2016 by president Maithripala Sirisena after the demise of Pandit Amaradewa. On 12 October 2017, an Inquisitive and Aesthetic Book titled "Sinhala Sangeethaye Sanath Nandasiri Sanathana Gee Miyasi' written by Yapa Bandara Seneviratne was released at 4.15 pm at the Colombo Public Library Auditorium.

On 24 February 2018, a ceremony was held at the Western Province Aesthetic University Resort Auditorium to pay homage to Sanath Nandasiri with a concert titled 'Ninnada 2018 Thunpath Rata Swara Dehana'. During the event, the President Maithripala Sirisena presented special honorary award to Nandasiri. On 4 September 2019, a collection of 100 lyrics and chords of Nandasiri's songs titled "Rasanandaya", was released at the Sri Lanka Foundation Institute. In the same year, he was honoured with Janabhimani Honorary Award at the Bandaranaike Memorial International Conference Hall.

== Filmography ==
Year	Film	Role	Ref.
1967	Sadol Kandulu	Playback Singer	
1969	Hari Maga	Playback Singer	
1969	Hanthane Kathawa	Playback Singer	
1970	Thevetha	Playback Singer	
1971	Samanala Kumariyo	Playback Singer	
1972	Hathara Wate	Playback Singer	
1972	Sihina Lowak	Playback Singer	
1974	Ahas Gauwa	Playback Singer	
1974	Duleeka	Playback Singer	
1974	Sagarika	Playback Singer	
1975	Amaraneeya Adare	Playback Singer	
1976	Diyamanthi	Playback Singer	
1976	Nedeyo	Playback Singer	
1977	Pembara Madhu	Playback Singer	
1978	Mage Ran Putha	Playback Singer	
1978	Vishmaya	Playback Singer	
1979	Jeewana Kandulu	Playback Singer	
1979	Hingana Kolla	Playback Singer	
1979	Wasanthaye Dawasak	Playback Singer	
1980	Doctor Susantha	Playback Singer	
1981	Senasuma	Playback Singer	
1981	Ajasaththa	Composer, Playback Singer	
1982	Miss Mallika	Playback Singer	
1983	Karate Joe	Playback Singer, Singer	
1983	Thunhiri Mal	Composer, Playback Singer	
1984	Ranmalige Wasanawa	Composer, Playback Singer	
1985	Rosy	Playback Singer	
1985	Mihidum Salu	Composer, Playback Singer	
1986	Asipatha Mamai	Playback Singer	
1987	Mangala Thegga	Playback Singer, Wedding Singer	
1987	Viragaya	Playback Singer	
1991	Salambak Handai	Playback Singer	
2000	Hansa Vilapaya	Playback Singer	
2000	Indrakeelaya	Playback Singer	
