= Premakeerthi de Alwis =

Sri Lankan broadcaster, lyricist (1947–1989)

- ප්‍රේමකීර්ති ද අල්විස්
- Born: Samaraweera Mudalige Don Premakeerthi de Alwis; 3 June 1947; Colombo, Ceylon
- Died: 31 July 1989 (aged 42); Colombo, Sri Lanka
- Cause of death: Gunshot wound
- Resting place: Kanatte Cemetery
- Education: Ananda College
- Occupations: Broadcaster; lyricist
- Years active: 1966–1989
- Known for: Radio broadcasting
- Spouses: Daya de Alwis; Nirmala de Alwis
- Children: 2

Samaraweera Mudalige Don Premakeerthi de Alwis (3 June 1947 – 31 July 1989 as Sinhala: ප්‍රේමකීර්ති ද අල්විස්), popularly known as Premakeerthi de Alwis, was a Sri Lankan radio and television broadcaster and lyricist. Considered as an iconic figure in Sri Lankan radio television history, he was assassinated during the 1987–89 JVP Insurrection at the age of 42 by armed movement of Janatha Vimukthi Peramuna (JVP).

== Early life and family ==
De Alwis was born on 3 June 1947 in Colombo, Ceylon. He was the second child of Simon de Alwis, a railway employee from Maradana. He was educated at Maradana Maligakande Maha Vidyalaya and Ananda College where he co-edited the school newspaper Dhamma Jayanthi and compiled the Anandaya magazine in 1965.

In 1961 he unsuccessfully auditioned to be a singer on Radio Ceylon. However, his speaking skills enabled him to take part in several children's radio programmes, including Lama Pitiya and Lama Mandapaya, presented by Karunaratne Abeysekera.

De Alwis had two children – a daughter (Surangi) from his relationship with Daya de Alwis, and a son (Poorna Sampath) from his relationship with Nirmala de Alwis.

== Career ==
De Alwis father wanted him join the railway department but de Alwis was attracted to radio broadcasting. De Alwis joined the Visithura magazine, part of the Davasa group, in 1966 as a feature writer. He started working for Radio Ceylon as a freelance announcer on 17 December 1967. He became a permanent announcer in June 1971 and was promoted to programme producer. He became a Grade Two announcer in 1974 and afterwards presented programmes such as Sonduru Sevana, Serisara Puvath Sangarawa and Shanida Sadaya on Radio Ceylon's successor Sri Lanka Broadcasting Corporation (SLBC). He later joined the Sri Lanka Rupavahini Corporation, presenting programmes such as Anduna, Shanidha Ayubowan and Sampath Rekha (National Lotteries Board).

De Alwis was a prolific lyricist, writing hundreds of songs. He wrote his first song, Hada Puda Asune Senehasa Bendune, in 1969 for Rupa Indumathi and Malkanthi Nandasiri. In the same year he wrote his first film song, for Lokuma Hinawa directed by K. A. W. Perera. He wrote songs for more than 150 films. He wrote songs for numerous singers including Mohideen Baig, Malini Bulathsinhala, Milton Mallawarachchi, J. A. Milton Perera, Mervyn Perera, Victor Ratnayake, Freddie Silva and Priya Suriyasena.

Popular songs written by de Alwis include Aaron Mama, Adaraneeya Neranjana, Adare Ran Bingun Nesu, Beri Bara Hindai Daruwan Dunne, Eda Re Guwan Thotupoledi, Eka Gini Koorai Mulu Gedarama Thibune, Kurullanta Gee Gayanna, Ma Ekkala Amanapawa Wee Dabara, Mannaram Piti Welle, Me Nagaraya, Mudu Parama Supiwithuru, Oba Dedunna Akasaye, Raththaran Menik Muthu Mokatada Ewa and Sanda Midulata Enawa.

== Assassination ==
At around 8.30pm on 31 July 1989, armed men, allegedly belonging to the Deshapremi Janatha Viyaparaya, the armed wing of JVP, stormed into de Alwis' home in Homagama. De Alwis tried to escape through the back door but more armed men were waiting in his back garden. His wife pleaded with the armed men and they assured her that they only wanted to question de Alwis. They dragged him outside and shot him dead. His bullet ridden body was later found 200 yards from his home. His remains were cremated at the General Cemetery, Kanatte on 7 August 1989.

In July 2014 a part of Independence Square Mawatha, the road leading to the SLBC headquarters in Colombo, was renamed Premakeerthi de Alwis Mawatha.
