= Nirosha Virajini =

Sri Lankan singer

- Born: 13 January 1973 (age 53); Kandy, Sri Lanka
- Occupations: Singer, musician and music director
- Spouses: Nalinda Sampath (m. 2000; div. 2005); Yasantha Nimalatheja (m. 2009)
- Website: www.niroshavirajini.lk

Virajini Lalithya de Silva, also known as Nirosha Virajini (Sinhala: නිරෝෂා විරාජිනී) is a Sri Lankan award-winning singer, musician and music director with a career spanning over 23 years.

== Personal life ==
Nirosha was born on 13 January 1973. She is a native of Kandy, Sri Lanka. She was married to Nalinda Sampath in 2000, but the couple got divorced in 2005. She married Yasantha Nimalatheja in 2009.

== Career ==
Nirosha has sung songs in Sinhalese, Tamil, Hindi, and Malayalam.

== Awards and honors ==
In 2000, 2002, and 2016, she was awarded as Best Female Vocalist at President's Award and Sarasaviya Awards for her contribution as a playback singer in the films "Rajya Sevaya Pinisai", "Kinihiriya Mal" and "Sinahawa Atharin" respectively.
