= Chandralekha Perera =

Chandralekha Perera චන්ද්‍රලේඛා පෙරේරා
- Born: Suramya Ratnakumari Chandralekha Perera; 1 December 1961 (age 64); Polgahawela, Sri Lanka
- Genres: Pop, classical
- Occupations: singer, actor
- Instrument: Vocals
- Spouse: Rookantha Gunathilake

Suramya Rathnakumari Chandralekha Perera (Sinhala: චන්ද්‍රලේඛා පෙරේරා) (born 1 December 1961), is a popular Sri Lankan pop singer and actress.

== Personal life ==
Perera was born to a middle-class family in Hewadiwela near Polgahawela.She attended St. Bernadette's College Polgahawela. As a child she often sang at home. At school she frequently sang and successfully took part in inter-school competitions. While studying she sang for the band, Spring Time, in Kurunegala. She met her future husband Rookantha Goonatillake in 1976 when he was a keyboard player for the band.

Perera married Rookantha Goonatillake in 1989, and together they have two daughters, Raini Charuka and Windy Goonatillake. She has two children from her previous marriage, Shyami Nadisha (daughter) and Yohan Perera (son).

== Music career ==
Without her knowledge, Perera's father submitted his daughter's name to a Sri-Lankan government-sponsored youth organisation National Youth Services Council (NYSC). She subsequently attended and had a successful interview. She also appeared on the national television service in Sri Lanka that was a gift from Japan to Sri Lanka and was at that time broadcasting test transmissions.

Perera was noticed by the film director and producer D. B. Nihalsinghe while he was reporting on the NYSC. He selected her to act in his new television series Rekha, which made her a star. She was given the award for best television actress in 1986 (for Nadee Geethaya, another series by Nihalsinghe), and the award for best playback singer in the same year (for the film Yali Hamuwennai). She was signed for LUX International by Lever Brothers at that time.

Perera has sung duets with many popular singers and actors. Vijaya Kumaranatunga, singing more than fifteen songs together.

== Violent incident ==
In 2000, she and her husband were violently attacked by the Presidential Security Division (PSD) of President Chandrika Kumaratunga and threatened with death if they performed at anti-government events. The attack sparked a protest by Dharmasiri Bandaranayake who thereafter also received death threats. In the wake of these developments, Artists Against Violence (AAV) was founded. Ten officers of the PSD were arrested for the attacks and given jail sentences in 2013, but Rookantha her husband and Chandralekha both handed in a letter to president Mahinda Rajapaksa. asking him to pardon the wrongdoers as they have chosen to forgive them especially because the PSD officials who were arrested are mere workers of the previous president and punishing the innocent is not their intention.
