= Suminda Sirisena =

Sri Lankan actor (1948–2023)

- සුමින්ද සිරිසේන
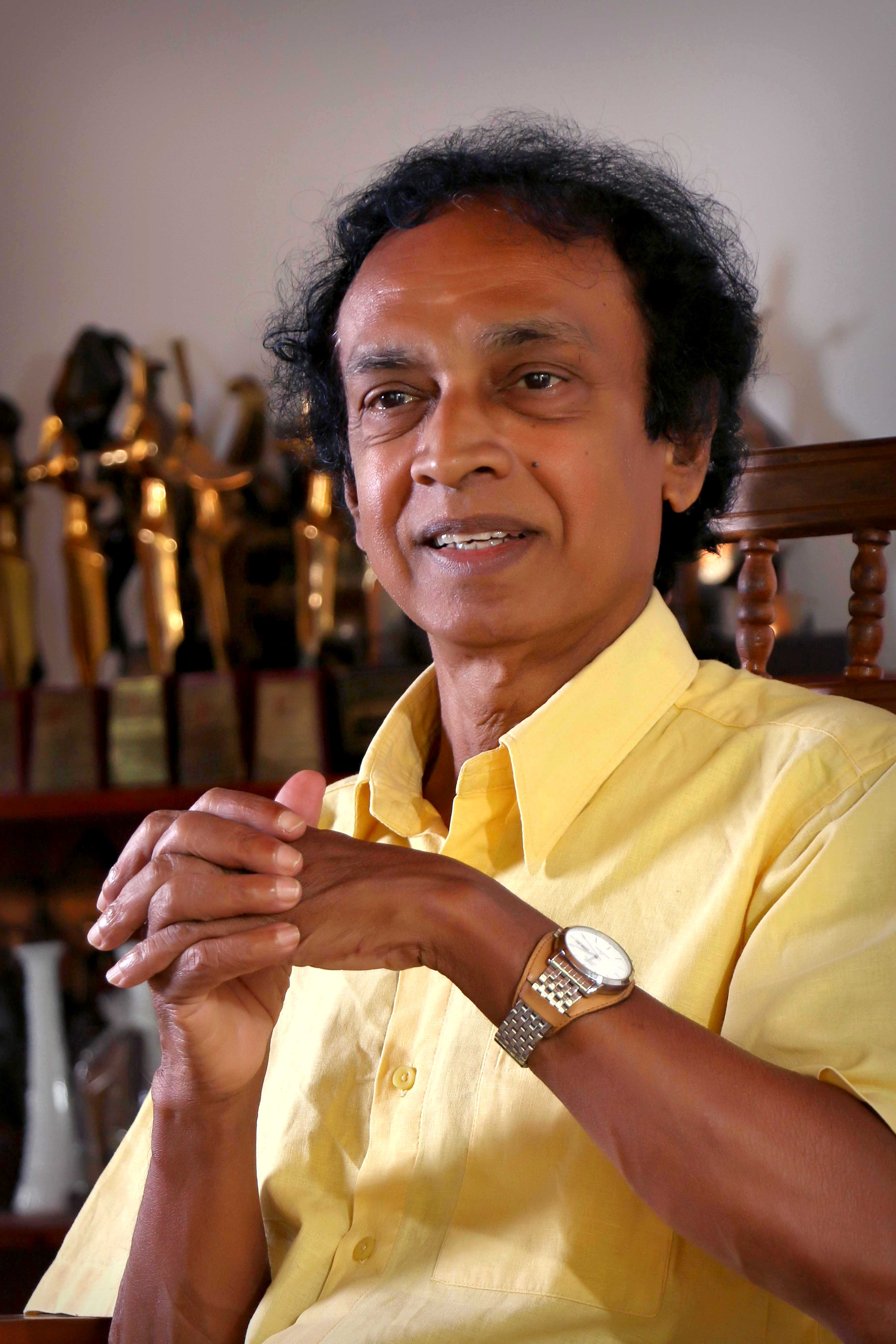
- Sirisena in 2013, by Nidahas
- Born: Suminda Sirisena; 4 July 1948; Bossella, Kegalle, Ceylon
- Died: 4 December 2023 (aged 75); Gampaha, Sri Lanka
- Education: Tholangamuwa Central College
- Alma mater: Open University of Sri Lanka; University of Sri Jayewardenepura
- Occupation: Actor
- Years active: 1966–2012
- Spouse: Leela Sirisena
- Children: 2
- Parents: Bulathgamuwage Singho (father); Punchi Nona (mother)
- Awards: Kala Keerthi (2017), Kala Bhushana (2014)

Kala Keerthi Suminda Sirisena (Sinhala: සුමින්ද සිරිසේන; 4 July 1948 – 4 December 2023) was an actor in Sri Lankan cinema, theatre and television. A highly versatile actor, Sirisena played a wide range of starring or supporting roles and was a recipient of the Best Actor award at many award festivals.

== Personal life ==
Sirisena was born on 4 July 1948, in Bossella, a rural village in Kegalle, Sri Lanka as the eldest of the family with four siblings. His father, Bulathgamuwage Singho was a small-time businessman in the village who also performed traditional Sri Lankan folk dramas and his mother, Punchi Nona, was a housewife. He had two younger brothers and a younger sister. After having his primary education at the village school Bossella Maha Vidyalaya, he was awarded a scholarship to attend Tholangamuwa Central College in 1963.

After his school education, Sirisena moved to Colombo to join the Sri Lanka Railways as a Special Apprentice in 1969. While establishing his career as an actor in theatre, Sirisena went to Oman in 1970 to work as a quantity surveyor for two years. After returning home, he worked as a technical officer at the Victoria Dam project. Then he went back abroad in 1979 and returned to Sri Lanka in 1984.

Before 1971, he was an activist and continually attended the meetings conducted by Janatha Vimukthi Peramuna. But as the party entered the process of armed struggle, he quit politics. He obtained a B.A. degree in Social Sciences from the Open University of Sri Lanka and then completed an M.A, degree from the University of Sri Jayewardenepura.

Suminda Sirisena was married to Leela Sirisena. The couple had two sons, Prabhath and Nanditha.

== Acting career ==
At Tholangamuwa Central College, he studied under Ariyawansa Ranaweera and Daya Alwis who were scholars and artists who had a major influence on Sri Lankan theatre and arts for many decades. In 1967, Sirisena played the lead role in the stage drama Girikūṭa which was selected to the final round of the State School Drama Festival. In 1969, he joined the first batch of students of the theatre school Ranga Shilpa Shalika, founded by Dhamma Jagoda.

His first role on the public stage was the role of "Dionis" in the play Mūdu Puththu, which also marked the first appearance of popular cinema actor Ravindra Randeniya. He acted in many stage dramas of the 1970s such as Namel Weeramuni's Vansakkārayō, Ranjith Dharmakeerthy's Hasthi Rāja Mahattayā and Hiru Næti Lova, Dayananda Gunawardene's ānanda Javanikā, Tilak Gunawardena's Kōntha Nōnā, Dhamma Jagoda's Ves Muhuṇu, Jayalath Manoratne's Andarēlā, Guru Tharuva', Bandula Vithanage's Rōmaya Gini Ganī. He made his film acting debut with Dhululu Malak (1976), in which he played Upali..

After returning to Sri Lanka in 1984, Sirisena was involved in Thilak Gunawardena's dramas. He acted in the plays Sapatheru Hamine by Miyuri Samarasinghe and then in Mī Pura Væsiyō by Somaratne Dissanayake. After completing the studies, he joined the drama group of Ediriweera Sarachchandra and acted in renowned stage dramas such as Manamē, Sinhabāhu, Kadāvaḷalu, Bava Kaḍathurā, and Mahāsāra. In 1993, Sirisena won the Best Actor award for the role in Kadathurawa at the State Drama Festival. In 2002, he formed a drama school called "Siwuranga". He was able to produce four batches of students from that academy. Thereafter he worked as an instructor at the Tower Hall Academy in Colombo. In 1997, he won the best actor award at the State Theater Festival that year for his performance in the play Rōmaya Gini Ganī.

Sirisena's first teledrama was Sihina Nimnaya, produced by Sri Lanka Rupavahini in 1985. He gained wide acclaim for his second teledrama Kumārihāmi, another Rupavahini production, where he played the supporting role of Hichchi Mahaththayā. He later acted in more than 40 teledrama series. His role as "Isaa" in the critically acclaimed serial Charitha Thunak is a hallmark of his television career. He later acted in the serials: Nisalavila, Ramya Suramya, Hada Vila Sakmana as well as in Asalvæsiyō with the role "Jayamangala".

He also acted in many critically notable films such as Saptha Kanya, Yakada Pihatu, Uppalawanna, Samanala Thatu, Uduganyamaya and Ira Handa Yata.

During his illness, he was working with two television serials, Sepalika and Boralu Paara.

=== Notable stage dramas ===
- Aadi Rele Nadagama
- Ananda Javanika
- Andarela
- Andhakaraya
- Bavakadaturawa
- Girikutha
- Hasthiraja Mahathmaya
- Hiru Nethi Lowa
- Kadathurawa
- Kada Walalu
- Konthanona Samugenima
- Mahasara
- Maname
- Meepura Wasiyo
- Megha
- Moodu Puththu
- Muhunu Dekak
- Nadagamkarayo
- Parassa
- Sapatheru Hamine
- Sinhabahu
- Thaksala Nadagama
- Umathu San Warusawa
- Vinishchaya
- Wansakkarayo
- Wes Muhunu

=== Selected television serials ===
- Abuddassa Kalaya
- Angani
- Asani Wasi
- Bogala Sawundiris
- Boralu Para
- Chandra Vinsathi
- Charitha Thunak
- Dambulugala Sakmana
- Dangakara Tharu
- Dumriya Andaraya,
- Ekamath Eka Rataka
- Ekata Gatuma
- Hathara Wate
- Jeewithaya Dakinna
- Jeewithaye Eka Dawasak (final role)
- Mage Kaviya Mata Denna
- Mehew Rate
- Mindada
- Monarathenna
- Nadeeladiya
- Nisala Vila
- Paramitha
- Pathok Palama
- Pipi Pium,
- Punaragamanaya
- Ramya Suramya
- Sepalika
- Sanda Amawakai
- Sanda Dev Diyani
- Sanda Nethi Lova
- Satya
- Sudu Mal Kanda
- Theth Saha Viyali
- Uththamavi
- Vinivindimi
- Weten Eha
- Yasa Isuru

=== Illness and death ===
In May 2012, Sirisena was admitted to the Intensive Care Unit of Colombo National Hospital due to sudden illness and fever. Beginning then, he had difficulties with walking. He was taking physiotherapy treatments at the time of his death. After 2012, Sirisena did not take part in any productions due to illness.

Sirisena died at a private hospital on 4 December 2023, at the age of 75.

== Filmography ==
- No. denotes the Number of Sri Lankan films in the Sri Lankan cinema.

Year	No.	Film	Role
1976	344	Duhulu Malak	Upali
1980	454	Dandu Monara	Punchi Mahaththaya
1993	770	Guru Gedara	Wedding guest
1993	782	Saptha Kanya	Sarath
2003	1016	Yakada Pihatu	Wilson 'Aiyya'
2004	1038	Gini Kirilli	
2005	1247	Udugan Yamaya	
2005	1054	Samanala Thatu	Soththi Martin
2007	1090	Uppalawanna	Veda Mahaththaya
2007	1109	Pitasakwala Kumarayai Pancho Hathai	
2010	1144	Ira Handa Yata	Trader
2011	1160	Gamani	School teacher
2013	1185	Bomba Saha Rosa	Minister Daya

== Awards and honours ==
- Suminda Sirisena was awarded Kala Keerthi, the highest national honour for arts, culture and drama in Sri Lanka, in 2017.
- In 2014 he was awarded the Deshanethru award and the Kala Bhushana state award in recognition of the service he had rendered to the country's performing arts.

=== State Drama Festival, Sri Lanka ===
Year	Nominee / work	Award	Result
1992	Megha	Best Supporting Actor	Won
1993	Bavakadathurawa	Best Actor	Nominated
1995	Andarela	Best Supporting Actor	Won
1997	Romaya Gini Gani	Best Actor	Won

=== State Tele Awards Festival, Sri Lanka ===
Year	Nominee / work	Award	Result
2007	Punaragamanaya	Best Supporting Actor	Nominated
2013	Monara Tenna	Best Supporting Actor	Won

=== Sumathi Tele Awards, Sri Lanka ===
Year	Nominee / work	Award	Result
1997	Megha	Best Supporting Actor	Won
1999	Nisala Wila	Best Actor	Won
2003	Ransirige Sangramaya	Best Supporting Actor	Won
2004	Ramya Suramya	Best Actor	Won

=== Signis Awards, Sri Lanka ===
Year	Nominee / work	Award	Result
1995	Siyapatha	Best Actor	Won
1995	Isiwara Asapuwa	Best Supporting Actor	Won
2002	Asani Wesi	Best Actor	Won
2004	Hadavila Sakmana	Best Actor	Won
2005	Uttamaviya	Best Actor	Won
2005	Ginikirillee	Outstanding Performance	Won
2006	Teth Saha Viyali	Best Actor	Won
2011	Abarthu Atha	Best Supporting Actor	Won

=== Raigam Awards, Sri Lanka ===
Year	Nominee / work	Award	Result
2003	Punchirala	Best Actor	Won
2018	Excellence of Drama	Special Merit Award	Won
