= Kokila Jayasuriya =

Sri Lankan actor (born 1994)

Kokila Pawan Jayasuriya
- Born: 1 November 1994 (age 31); Piliyandala, Sri Lanka
- Education: Piliyandala Central College, Piliyandala
- Occupations: Actor; Model; Singer
- Years active: 2006–present
- Known for: Nadagamkarayo; Siri Raja Siri
- Spouse: Nimali Fernando (m.2020)
- Parents: Dhammika Dinesh Jayasuriya (father); Deepika Jayasuriya (mother)
- Relatives: Dilshan Sathsara Sawan Jayasuriya (brother); Hiruni Jayasuriya (sister)

Kokila Pawan Jayasuriya (born 1 November 1994) (Sinhala: කෝකිල පවන් ජයසූරිය) is an actor in Sri Lankan cinema, theatre and television. He is very popular as a child artist for the role "Sirimal" in the film Siri Raja Siri and role "Manamaalan" in the television serial Nadgamkarayo.

== Personal life ==
Kokila was born on 1 November 1994 in Piliyandala, Sri Lanka, as the eldest and his younger brother Dilshan Sathsara Sawan is also an actor. He studied at Piliyandala Central College. In 2020, he married his long time partner, Nimali Dilshani Fernando.

== Career ==
He approached the stage through Sri Shobitha Dhampasela and school, his drama teacher, ' Kokilani ' recognised his skills and encouraged him to take part in the children's program Hapan Padura. He applied, got through the interview and was a member of the team. He started his career as a stage actor in stage dramas conducted by Jayalath Manoratne at the age of twelve, where he was selected for the role of Sethu in the stage drama Thala Mala Pipila, produced by Manoratne. He also performed in Monratne's play Makara. Then he performed in the play Punchi Punchi Petiyo, produced by Bandula Kuruwitarachchi, for which Jayasuriya won first place in the State Drama Festival in 2005.

In 2007, he received a chance to act in the film Siri Raja Siri, directed by Somaratne Dissanayake. After critics acclaimed his performance in the film, he was chosen to act in Aba, directed by Jackson Anthony, where he portrayed Aba as a child.

As a child artist, he acted in the mega serial Malee. In 2021, he appeared in the television serial Nadagamkarayo broadcast on Swarnawahini TV. His role as Malan in the serial became highly popular where the series eventually became trending in the YouTube. Meanwhile he also nominated for the Best Actor of the year at Sumathi Awards and reached Top 5 of the category. Apart from that, he also acted in the teledramas such as Aaliya, Sidu, Dangale, and Sihina Samagama.

Jayasuriya is also a singer who started career with Hapan Padura. He is also a dubbing artist and a chef.

=== Selected television serials ===
- Aaliya
- Dangale
- Daam
- Malee
- Nadagamkarayo
- Ralla Weralata Adarei
- Sidu
- Ruwan Maliga
- Sihina Samagama
- Uthum pathum

== Filmography ==
Year	Film	Role	Ref.
2008	Siri Raja Siri	Sirimal	
2008	Aba		
2012	Daruwane	Nadeeka	
2016	Sinhaya		
2017	Aloko Udapadi		
TBD	Surangana Lowin Awilla		
