= Poronduwa =

Poronduwa පොරොන්දුව
- Directed by: Chandran Rutnam
- Written by: Herbert Ranjith Peiris; Chandran Rutnam
- Produced by: Taprobane Films
- Starring: Ravindra Randeniya; Vasanthi Chathurani; Asoka Peiris
- Cinematography: Sumedha Liyanage; Donald Karunarathna
- Edited by: Elmo Haliday
- Music by: Rohana Weerasinghe
- Distributed by: CEL Theaters
- Release date: 10 August 2001
- Country: Sri Lanka
- Language: Sinhala

Poronduwa (Promise) (Sinhala: පොරොන්දුව) is a 2001 Sri Lankan Sinhala drama thriller film directed by Chandran Rutnam and produced by Ashoka Perera for Taprobane Films. It stars Ravindra Randeniya and Vasanthi Chathurani in lead roles along with Asoka Peiris and Iranganie Serasinghe. Music composed by Rohana Weerasinghe. It is the 960th Sri Lankan film in the Sinhala cinema.

The film has received mostly positive reviews by critics.

== Cast ==
- Ravindra Randeniya as Vijendra Rambukwella
- Vasanthi Chathurani as Pooja
- Asoka Peiris as Ajith
- Iranganie Serasinghe as Mrs. Rambukwella
- Somy Rathnayake as Opposition Politician
- Achala Alles as Nurse
- Leena de Silva as Ajith's mother
- Manel Jayasena as Principal
- Vijaya Hettiarchchi
- Channa Wijewardana
- Thalatha Gunasekara
- Suneetha Wimalaweera
- Kumudu Nishantha
- Dharmadasa Kuruppu
- Lucky Wickramanayaka
- Shesha Palihakkara
- Vindya Warakagoda
- Sriyani Perera
- Shohan Perera
- George McDonald

== Song track ==
- Ananthayak wee - Rookantha Gunathilake, Chandralekah Perera
- Piyavi Nethu Walin - Amarasiri Peris, Chandralekah
