= Samanala Thatu =

Samanala Thatu සමනල තටු
- title card
- Directed by: Somaratne Dissanayake
- Written by: Somaratne Dissanayake
- Produced by: Renuka Balasooriya
- Starring: Dasun Madushanka; Suminda Sirisena; Duleeka Marapana
- Cinematography: Channa Deshapriya
- Music by: Rohana Weerasinghe
- Production company: Cine Film Lanka
- Distributed by: EAP Theaters
- Release date: 5 September 2005
- Country: Sri Lanka
- Language: Sinhala

Samanala Thatu (Butterfly Wings) (Sinhala: සමනල තටු) is a 2005 Sri Lankan Sinhala children's drama film directed by Somaratne Dissanayake and produced by Renuka Balasooriya. It stars Dasun Madushanka, Suminda Sirisena and Duleeka Marapana in lead roles along with Jayalath Manoratne and Vijaya Nandasiri. Music composed by Rohana Weerasinghe. The film received mostly positive reviews. It is the 1054th Sri Lankan film in the Sinhala cinema.

== Cast ==
- Dasun Madushanka as Sirisena aka Sira
- Suminda Sirisena as Soththi Martin
- Duleeka Marapana as Batti
- Dulanjalie Ariyatillake as Sira's sister
- Jayalath Manoratne as Hospital keeper
- Giriraj Kaushalya as Bicycle Shop owner
- Chandra Kaluarachchi as Prostitute dealer
- Quintus Weerakoon
- Vijaya Nandasiri as Doctor
- Hemantha Iriyagama as Police Constable
- Ajith Lokuge as Drug dealer
- Jagath Benaragama as Drug dealer
- Anton Jude as Sarath
- Wasantha Wittachchi as Lawyer
- Sarath Chandrasiri as Money exchanger
- Renuka Balasooriya as Child Fund owner
- Gamini Hettiarachchi as Balloon businessman
- Somasiri Alakolange
- Sarath Kothalawala as Sex boy dealer
- Dayadeva Edirisinghe

== Soundtrack ==
No.	Title	Lyrics	Singer(s)	Length
1.	"Meka Soduru Lokayak"	Somarathna Dissanayake	Harshana Dissanayaka

== Awards ==
Dulanjalie Ariyatillake, who needs special needs, makes her debut acting in the film. She won special award for her contribution for arts in the film as well. The film also won the most popular film at 31st Sarasaviya Film Festival. Dasun Madushan won Jury Special Award at Presidential Film Festival 2006.
