= Vidhu =

Vidhu may refer to

- Vidhu (actor), Indian actor
- Vidhu (film), 2010 Sri Lankan film
