= CineMa =

2022 Sri Lankan film

- Sinhala: සිනේමා
- Directed by: Kapila Sooriyarachchi
- Written by: Kapila Sooriyarachchi
- Produced by: Champika Jayanandana
- Starring: Shyam Fernando; Douglas Ranasinghe; Robin Fernando; Bimal Jayakody; Gamini Hettiarachchi
- Cinematography: Nishantha Pradeep
- Edited by: Prasanga Napawala
- Music by: Dr. Rohana Weerasinghe
- Production companies: Communi Network; Dil Films International
- Release date: September 2, 2022
- Country: Sri Lanka
- Language: Sinhala

CineMa (Sinhala: සිනේමා, lit. 'The film and me'), is a 2022 Sri Lankan Sinhala drama film directed by Dr. Kapila Sooriyarachchi and produced by Champika Jayanandana for Ideal Creations in association with Communi Network and Dil Films International. The film stars ensemble cast including Shyam Fernando, newcomer Vihanga Sooriyarachchi in lead roles and Nayanathara Wickramarachchi, Douglas Ranasinghe, Robin Fernando, Bimal Jayakody, Chandani Seneviratne, and Isuru Lokuhettiarachchi made supportive roles. The theme of the film is "The Conscience of the People Who Made Cinema as Their Soul". The film is based on the story of six people who are associated with cinema. It deals with how other people influence each other's journey in cinema.

The film was earlier scheduled to screen on 22 April 2022, but later delayed. Finally the film was released on 2 September 2022.

== Plot ==
Dissanayake Mudiyanselage Sumal Dharmaratne is working as a film machine operator in a leading cinema hall in Colombo. His father was also a film machine operator and Sumal has been helping his father since he was a child. Like watching many movies, he had a good knowledge and understanding of cinema through reading. Making a movie was his only dream ever. Jaliya Jayasekara is a handsome 20 year old youth. His father is a well-known professor and a specialist doctor and they live a very luxurious life. Jaliya, who has been interested in cinema since childhood,'s only dream of becoming an expert in film studies. At his father's urging, his older sister becomes a doctor, and Jaliya also studies biology and qualifies to enter medical school. He leaves his house without informing anyone and acts as an assistant under Sumal. He lives with Sumal in a small annex in a shantytown. Its owner Rupalatha is a kind lady who also provides them with food.

Sagara Premachandra is a great character actor in cinema. He is a 75-year-old screenwriter and film director. Still actively contributes to cinema, his only dream and aspiration was to see the rise of cinema. Ananda Gunaratne is a 76 year old popular Sinhala film star. He spent his acting career as a stuntman. Due to an accident on set, he uses a wheelchair. Due to his commitment to cinema, he maintains a private cinema museum, lives in the memory of cinema and serves the public in a different way. Thilini Samarasinghe is a beautiful 19-year-old girl who lives in a remote village and dreams of becoming a film actress. She is constantly applying for newspaper advertisements that apply for the actor-actress requirements for filmmaking.

Vishwa Keerthi Amarasuriya is a businessman. He is a person who uses his own money to make films with other creators and falsely uses his name for those productions. Through these creations, he has won local and foreign awards and popularity and is in touch with crooked film racketeers. The launch of Vishwa Keerthi's new film is attended by many artists and politicians representing the past and present of cinema and various fields of art. Vishwa Keerthi was furious to learn that his film had been heavily edited and it was finally revealed that it was done by Sumal. Sumal loses his job at the cinema and Jaliya leaves with him. Sagara Premachandra, who was the chief guest that day, was amazed at Sumal's script that was displayed in the hall, which was far superior to the original version of the film.

Losing the job, Sumal is very excited to go through the various job opportunities in the film industry, from pasting posters to living with Jaliya. They join a film production team and work on various activities until the end of the film production. They end up unemployed again after that. Sumal, who picked up a screenplay he wrote many years ago, tells Jaliya that his cinematic dream is coming true. Jaliya is surprised and when asked how he can make a lot of money for it, he says that the only valuable thing he has is an old movie projector that his father used for about 40 years in a movie theater, which he bought in memory of his father. Seeing that he would not give up his innocent endeavor, Jaliya also offered to help. According to a newspaper advertisement, the projector will be sold to Ananda Gunaratne, the artist who owns the Cinema Museum. Although he does not discourage Sumal, he also describes the difficulties, risks and experiences of filmmaking. He not only buys Sumal's old cinema projector, but also kindly arranges a place near his film museum for meetings and training. Advertising in a newspaper gathers the team needed for the film where Thilini Samarasinghe is one of the many newcomers.

Finally, Amarasuriya is trying to pursue Sumal's talent and he was lured into the next fake creation with his own name. Jaliya and Thilini contributed to the cast where the clash between Jaliya and Vishwakeerthi starts along with the Jaliya's family conflicts.

== Cast ==
- Shyam Fernando as Sumal Dharmaratne
- Vihanga Sooriyarachchi as Jaliya Jayasekara
- Douglas Ranasinghe as Sagara Premachandra
- Robin Fernando as Ananda Gunaratne
- Nayanathara Wickramarachchi as Thilini Samarasinghe
- Bimal Jayakody as Vishwa Keerthi Amarasuriya
- Isuru Lokuhettiarachchi
- Duleeka Marapana as Rupalatha
- Kalani Dodanthenna as Jaliya's girlfriend
- Gamini Hettiarachchi
- Jagath Benaragama
- Chandani Seneviratne
- Wijeratne Warakagoda
- Iranganie Serasinghe
- Udeni Alwis
- Thusith Ranaweera
- Trishala Natashi
- Kaushalya Samarasinghe
- Oshem De Silva
- Ashoka Amunugama

== Production ==
The film marked as the second directorial venture of Dr. Kapila Sooriyarachchi after 2012 film Prathiroo. It has been more than five years since the film was produced, but it has not been screened in island-wide theatres except for a few special screenings. Nishantha Pradeep was the cinematographer, Prasanga Napawala was the editor, colorist and visual effect supervisor whereas Buddhi Sanjaya Edirisinghe and Dinesh Indika Wijesiri were the art directors and Damayanthi Fonseka was the cost manager and Susantha Ramasinghe was the costume designer. Dr. Rohana Weerasinghe is the music director whereas Senaka Batagoda, Amarasiri Peiris, Uresha Ravihari and Ranjan Saliya Perera made the background singing. Vihanga Sooriyarachchi introduced to cinema with the film. Lyrics also penned by director himself.
