= Vaishnavee =

2018 film directed by Sumitra Peries

- Film poster
- Sinhala: වෛෂ්ණාවී
- Directed by: Sumitra Peries
- Written by: Tony Ranasinghe
- Produced by: Mano Nanayakkara
- Starring: Samadhi Arunachaya; Thumindu Dodantenna; Jayalath Manoratne
- Cinematography: Donald Karunaratne
- Edited by: Chamath Paranawidana
- Music by: Nimal Mendis
- Release date: 5 April 2018
- Running time: 115 minutes
- Country: Sri Lanka
- Language: Sinhala

Vaishnavee (Sinhala: වෛෂ්ණාවී, lit. 'The Goddess') is a 2018 Sri Lankan Sinhala drama thriller film directed by veteran director Sumitra Peries and produced by Mano Nanayakkara. The film stars Yashoda Wimaladharma, Thumindu Dodantenna and Jayalath Manoratne in lead roles along with Vasanthi Chathurani and Cletus Mendis. Popular teledrama actress Samadhi Arunachaya made her cinema debut with the film. The music is composed by Nimal Mendis, and is his last music direction before his death. The film was shot in 2012, and Sumitra Peries was the first director to shoot with the latest Red Epic camera in Sri Lanka. The film had the last script written by Tony Ranasinghe before his death.

The film received mostly positive reviews from critics. The film was released in 30 theaters throughout the country.

== Plot ==
The story was influenced by veteran director Lester James Peries.

A puppeteer proposes to a girl but she runs away with another boy before their engagement. The sad puppeteer then carves a puppet in the shape of the girl of his dreams out of a tree where a goddess secretly lives. The puppet then turns alive with the soul of that goddess and falls in love with the puppeteer, but the fact that they are from two different worlds becomes a barrier to their relationship.

== Cast ==
- Yashoda Wimaladharma as Vaishnavee, the Tree Goddess
- Samadhi Arunachaya as Ruchira
- Rohana Beddage as Gurunnanse
- Vasanthi Chathurani as Laxmi's mother
- Thumindu Dodantenna as Osanda
- Shehara Hewadewa as Laxmi
- Jayalath Manoratne as Ruchira's Father
- Mahendra Perera as Simon
- Roshan Pilapitiya as Laxmi's Lover
- Iranganie Serasinghe as Osanda's grandmother
- Cletus Mendis as Boatman
- Thesara Jayawardane as Laxmi's friend
- Veena Jayakody as Guru Maniyo

== Songs ==
The film contains two songs. Melodies are by Nimal Mendis and music coordination by Suresh Maliyadde.

No.	Title	Lyrics	Singer(s)	Length
1.	"Maa Ridawaa Yadamin"	Rathna Sri Wijesinghe	Indika Upamali
2.	"Kisida Nopethu De"	Nimal Mendis	Rukman Asitha, Meena Prasadini
