= Punchi Suranganavi =

Punchi Suranganavi පුංචි සුරංගනාවී
- Directed by: Somaratne Dissanayake
- Written by: Somaratne Dissanayake
- Produced by: Renuka Balasooriya
- Starring: Tharaka Hettiarachchi; Nithyavani Kandasami; Sriyantha Mendis
- Cinematography: Suminda Weerasinghe
- Edited by: Ravindra Guruge
- Music by: Rohana Weerasinghe
- Release date: 19 July 2002
- Country: Sri Lanka
- Language: Sinhala

Punchi Suranganavi (Little Angel) (Sinhala: පුංචි සුරංගනාවී) is a 2002 Sri Lankan Sinhala children's film directed by Somaratne Dissanayake and produced by Renuka Balasooriya. It stars two child artistes Tharaka Hettiarachchi and Nithyavani Kandasami in lead roles along with Sriyantha Mendis and Dilani Abeywardana. Music composed by Rohana Weerasinghe. The film has received positive reviews and adjudged many awards as well. It is the 984th film in the Sri Lankan cinema.

== Plot ==
The film revolves around a young boy named Sampath Perera who suffers from psychological trauma. As a toddler, Sampath witnessed his parents arguing and fighting and this caused him psychological trauma and impaired his ability to speak. Both of his parents had had extra-marital affairs and his mother ended up leaving Sri Lanka with her lover to go to Canada. Sampath ended up living in Sri Lanka with his father. His father, Mr. Perera provides him a luxurious life with all the comforts a child could ever want such as modern toys, videos, a swimming pool, cakes, chocolates, etc. But Sampath is not happy at all as he lacks a bond with his father. Sampath has a habit of breaking and smashing things at home whenever he is upset. The arrival of their Tamil servant's young daughter, Sathya, brings about a positive impact to Sampath's life. Sampath starts enjoying life after Sathya arrives.

One day, he observes her watering the plants in his garden and he too starts using the water hose to water the plants. He is intrigued by her singing, dancing and storytelling. The two become friends and Sampath quickly learns how to speak in Tamil. He starts sharing his treats like apples, chocolate and cake with Sathya. Likewise, Sathya also shares her chocolates with him and brings him fresh flowers. The two enjoy riding bicycles, feeding their lunch to the birds, watching cartoons and dancing like elephants. Every time Sathya's father yells at her, Sampath gets angry. Mr. Perera is concerned as to whether he should send Sathya away because Sampath does not seem to learn the English and Sinhala languages. He only speaks Tamil. Sampath tends to imitate Sathya's speech and actions. So Sampath's doctor suggests to his father that Sathya should also be taught the English and Sinhala languages along with Sampath in order to encourage Sampath to learn those languages effectively.

With the help of an English Language Tuition Master and a Sinhala Language Tuition Mistress, both Sampath and Sathya start mastering the English language as well as the Sinhala language. The title of the movie - Punchi Suranganavi (The Little Angel) corresponds to Sathya as being "The Little Angel" who is capable of transforming the troubled Sampath into a happy young boy. Gradually, Mr. Perera's prejudice toward Tamil people fades away. Mr. Perera, Sampath, Sathya and Sampath's nurse enjoy a memorable and joyful day swimming in their pool at home. But this new found happiness does not last long as Sathya's father is killed in the 1983 Sinhala-Tamil conflict. The film ends with Sathya leaving the Perera's house stating that she and her mother will return after Sinhala and Tamil people become friends. Sampath goes back to being his old self - a troubled child who smashes up household items when upset.

== Cast ==
- Tharaka Hettiarachchi as Sampath Perera
- Nithyavani Kandasami as Sathya
- Sriyantha Mendis as Mr. Perera, Sampath's father
- Dilani Abeywardana as Nurse Shanika
- Malini Fonseka as Sinhala teacher
- Jayalath Manoratne as English teacher
- Henry Jayasena as Psychiatric
- Janaka Kumbukage as Suren
- Namel Weeramuni as Doctor
- Rathna Lalani Jayakody as Abandoned nurse
- Giriraj Kaushalya Mudalali who saved Sathya from Criminals
- Kusum Renu as Mrs. Perera, Sampath's estranged mother

== Soundtrack ==
No.	Title	Singer(s)	Length
1.	"Punchi Suranganawak"	Ruwani Kaushalya

== Production ==
After a successful blockbuster movie Saroja, director Dissanayake continued to work in another children's movie which was based on Sinhala Tamil ethnic problem in 1983 era of Sri Lanka. He selected Nithyavani Kandasami, who portrayed "Saroja" in his 2001 film as the lead child artist with a newcomer Tharaka Hettiarachchi for the other child character. Shooting was completed in Kandy and negatives were printed in India.

== Awards ==
=== Dhaka International Film Festival ===
Year	Nominee / work	Award	Result
2003	Punchi Suranganavi	Jury Mention Award	Won

=== Kerala International Film Festival ===
Year	Nominee / work	Award	Result
2003	Punchi Suranganavi	Golden Crow Pheasant Prize	Nominated
