= Saroja (2000 film) =

Saroja සරෝජා
- Directed by: Somaratne Dissanayake
- Written by: Somaratne Dissanayake
- Screenplay by: Somaratne Dissanayake
- Produced by: Renuka Balasuriya
- Starring: Nithyavani Kandasami; Joe Abeywickrama; Susantha Chandramali; Nita Fernando
- Cinematography: Suminda Weerasinghe
- Edited by: Stanley de Alwis
- Music by: Rohana Weerasinghe
- Release date: 10 March 2000
- Running time: 103 minutes
- Country: Sri Lanka
- Languages: Sinhalese & Tamil

Saroja (Sinhala: සරෝජා), is a 2000 Sri Lankan Sinhalese children's drama film directed by Somaratne Dissanayake as maiden feature film and produced by his wife Renuka Balasuriya. It stars two child artists Pramudi Karunarathne and Nithyavani Kandasami in lead roles along with Janaka Kumbukage and Joe Abeywickrama. Music composed by Rohana Weerasinghe. It is the 931st film in Sri Lankan cinema. The film is a hugely successful film that has won awards and critical acclaim worldwide.

== Plot ==
Saroja is a little Tamil girl. Her father is a rebel and one day their home is burnt, and Saroja's mother is dead. Due to the army attacking Saroja's father is wounded and they run away to the jungle. They enter an adjoining Sinhala village.

The father and daughter meet Varuni, the little daughter of the village school teacher. Varuni is also of the same age as Saroja, but they cannot understand each other due to the language barrier.

But gradually a strong bond of friendship between them builds up. Varuni pleads with her parents and with much difficulty succeeds in providing accommodation for Saroja in their home. Later Saroja's father is also given shelter in the house.

However, suspicions arise among Police and Army officers resulting in the family being subject to various types of obstacles from the forces. Suddenly Saroja's father is killed.

Varuni's father is given a punishment transfer to another remote village school. The family too leaves, the village along with Saroja who is now treated as a family member

== Cast ==
- Nithyavani Kandasami as Saroja
- Pramudi Karunarathne as Varuni
- Janaka Kumbukage as Punchibanda, Varuni's father
- Mervyn Mahesan as Sundaralingam, Saroja's father
- Nita Fernando as Varuni's mother
- Susantha Chandramali as Nurse
- Sampath Tennakoon as Police Chief
- Mahendra Perera as Sirisena
- Asoka Peiris as Boutique owner
- Ranjini Rajamohan as Saroja's mother
- Mahinda Pathirage
- Winnie Wettasinghe
- Lalith Janakantha
- Tony Ranasinghe as guest artist
- Ravindra Randeniya as guest artist Major Fernando

== Reception ==
The film was chosen to represent the competitive section of the International Film Festival commenced in Dhaka on 20 January 2000. The film won the Audience Award Dhaka International Film Festival held on 28 January 2000. It also shared the NETPAC Award for the Best Asian Film with fellow Sri Lankan film Padadaya directed by Linton Semage.

The film was also selected to compete at the 33rd Annual Worlfest-Houston International Film Festival at the public screening section of the festival from 7 to 16 April 2000. At the festival, Saroja won Bronze award in competitive section.

== Awards ==
- Audience award (Best film) - Dhaka International Film Festival (Bangladesh) 2000
- Best Asian Film (Netpac Award) - Dhaka International Film Festival (Bangladesh) 2000
- Bronze Award Independent Theatrical Feature Films - First Feature - Houston International Film Festival (USA) 2000
- Special Award of the Festival - Pyongyang International Film Festival (Korea) 2000
- Best Director - Iran International Film Festival (Isfahan - Iran) 2000
- Best Performance (Pramudi & Nithyavani) - Iran International Film Festival (Isfahan - Iran) 2000
- LivUllmann Peace Award - Chicago International Film Festival (USA) 2000
- Audience Award -Vesoul International Film Festival (France) 2000
