= Underpants Thief =

- ජංගි හොරා
- Directed by: Somaratne Dissanayake
- Written by: Somaratne Dissanayake
- Produced by: Renuka Balasooriya
- Starring: Pubudu Chathuranga; Dilhani Ekanayake; Chinthaka Kulathunga
- Cinematography: Vishwa Balasooriya
- Edited by: Ajith Ramanayake
- Music by: Rohana Weerasinghe
- Release date: 23 December 2021
- Running time: 98 minutes
- Country: Sri Lanka
- Language: Sinhala

Underpants Thief (Sinhala: ජංගි හොරා) is a 2021 Sri Lankan Sinhalese language drama film directed by Somaratne Dissanayake and produced by Renuka Balasooriya. It stars Pubudu Chathuranga and Dilhani Ekanayake in lead roles along with Chinthaka Kulathunga and Buddhi Randeniya. Music composed by Rohana Weerasinghe.

The film has been granted permission to screen with 'adults only' certification by the Public Performance Control Board. The media screening was held in early December 2021 at the Savoy Premier Cinema. The film was screened in overseas in 2017, where the film was officially screened in Sri Lanka on 23 December 2021.

== Plot ==
While Mahesh accompanies his newly wed wife Nayani to visit his brother Sam who resides in their inherent estate bungalow, Nayani notices peculiar behavioral patterns from Sam. One morning, their neighbor Indu notices that a couple of her panties are missing from the clothesline, and inquires from Nayani who is also perplexed about a couple of her own panties missing. Sam goes to a shopping mall and vehemently insists the sales girl to give him a laced panty on a display dummy. He brings it home and offers if to Nayani who gets infuriated with the dirty joke. Their young servant Karuna explains to her that Sam has a mental illness and is suffering from a severe case of underwear fetishism. Sam continues his odd behavior by touching the revealed panties on top of the jeans of girls in parks and buses and ends up beaten by the public and eventually taken into custody multiple times. Mahesh is fed up after explaining police officers that his brother is not normal, however the police inspector advises that if they formally declare Sam is mentally insane, he will not be arrested again.

Meanwhile, Mahesh is trying to sell the family estate bungalow to the wealthy Australian investor Gregory Philip Watson. Mahesh's lawyer constantly reminds him that since Sam is the sole beneficiary of the property, his consent is a must for the business deal however his signature shall be null and void if he is declared mentally insane. This dilemma constantly bothers Mahesh. Upon seeking advice from a psychiatrist, they help Sam by purchasing him brand new panties and erotic magazines in order to discourage him from scavenging on Nayani, Karuna and Indu's worn panties. However Sam continues his usual stunts. While Nayani is having a shower, Sam retreats her panty using a stick sent through the window pane. Nayani follows him to his room to get it back but Karuna who knew that Sam is sniffing its gusset tells her that he is in another mood and to talk to him later. The following day, Nayani observes that Sam is mazophiliac as well when she saw Karuna charging him money to show her breasts and allowing to caress the nipples. Being a classical guitarist, Sam personifies the female nipple and areola to guitar strings, and play with them.

While Nayani recommends finding a suitable girl and getting Sam married as a cure, Mahesh insists that no girl will marry him. Their psychiatrist recommends that in order to give Sam what he needs, marriage is in fact not a necessity. Therefore Mahesh hires a prostitute and sends her to Sam's room. When she strips down to her thong, Sam starts caressing her nipples. When she gets totally nude and hands Sam her thong to lure him, he starts sniffing it. When she unpacks a condom and Sam starts filling air into it like a balloon, it turns her off. When she requests him to return her the thong, Sam pays her for it and adds it to his comprehensive collection of panties in his cupboard. Despite hiring a handyman to accompany Sam when he travels, and giving him her own panties to no avail, Nayani gets frustrated with him. Even Karuna starts scolding him when his peeping tommery escalates into breaking the bathroom door and confronting Karuna naked under her shower. Indu catches Sam red handed when he snatches one of her panties again from the clothesline and threatens to inform the police station. When Sam hands over one of Indu's old panties back to her, she noticed that it has been tampered with and smashes it to the ground with disgust. Nayana feels sorry for Sam and reconciliates by allowing him to snatch her panties while she is having sexual intercourse with Mahesh and also allowing him to caress her breasts under the condition that he does it only with her. As the time goes by, Mahesh and Nayani embraces Sam for who he is and appreciates his authenticity and sense of humour displayed during the bungalow selling agreement. Despite losing the business deal, they are happy for being able to give their priority to Sam.

== Cast ==
- Pubudu Chathuranga as Sam
- Dilhani Ekanayake as Nayani
- Chinthaka Kulathunga as Mahesh
- Buddhi Randeniya as Karuna
- Neetha Samaranayake as Indu
- Heli Perera as Prostitute
- Thumindu Dodantenna as Psychiatrist
- Kelum Wijesuriya as Lawyer
- Lalith Janakantha as Sarath the handyman
- Sinethi Akila as Girl in the bus
- Aruni Mendis as Sales girl
- Jeyarajan Yogaraj as Sales manager
- Michael Gretson as Gregory Philip Watson

== International screening ==
- Busan International Film Festival.
- Asian Film Festival.
- Osaka Asian Film Festival.
- 5th Delhi International Film Festival - Best Film at the ‘Cinema Across the Borders’ section.
