= Sidu (TV series) =

Sri Lankan 2016 teledrama

- Also known as: Malee 3
- Genre: Adventure
- Created by: Thilina Boralessa
- Based on: Malee; Aththamma (Malee 2)
- Directed by: Thilina Boralessa; Pradeep Manawadu
- Starring: Nethma Aakashmita; Kaveesh Vihanga; W. Jayasiri
- Voices of: Yashodha Priyadarshini; Kaveesh Induwara; Umali Thilakarathne; Sithija Theekshana; Nivani Deedunusri; Rusiru Induwara; Sithmini Sulakkana
- Opening theme: Randuwak Kale Ne (2016-21); Handata Yanna (2021-22)
- Country of origin: Sri Lanka
- Original language: Sinhala
- No. of episodes: 1402

Production
- Executive producer: Janaka Siriwardhana
- Running time: 20 minutes

Original release
- Network: TV Derana
- Release: 8 August 2016 – 7 January 2022

Related
- Aththamma (Malee 2); Shakthi (Sidu 2)

Sidu also known as Malee 3 is a 2016 Sri Lankan long-running teledrama and is the third installment in the Malee TV series which aires in 2011–12 broadcast on TV Derana. It is a sequel to the 2013 teledrama Aththamma (Malee 2) and follows the story of Malee's son, Sidu who is abducted by his mother's former foes, and the boy's friendship with a young Buddhist monk. Sidu is written by Saman Edirimunee and directed by Thilina Boralessa. This drama aired from 8 August 2016 to 7 January 2022. A sequel named Shakthi (Sidu 2) aired from 10 January 2022 to 4 August 2023.

== Seasons ==
Season	Title	No. Episodes	Originally aired	
Season	Title	No. Episodes	First aired	Last aired
1	Malee	476	24 January 2011	14 December 2012
2	Aththamma	440	18 March 2013	28 November 2014
3	Sidu	1402	8 August 2016	7 January 2022
4	Shakti	402	10 January 2022	4 August 2023

== Plot ==
Sidu who inherits wizarding powers, returns to Sri Lanka from England with his father, Nirmal. However, he is kidnapped by his mother's former foe, Ukkuwa and his son, Nandipala. Ukkuwa erases Sidu's memory. Nandipala, pretending as Sumanasiri, elopes to a rural village named, Polpithigama. He introduces Sidu as his nephew, Malitha and works to a gem businessman, Manchanayake. Sidu befriends with a little Buddhist monk of Polpithigama temple, Soratha Thero.

Sidu's mother and sister, Malee and Theruni return to Sri Lanka to search Sidu. Manchanayake tries to locate a hidden ancient treasure, which belongs to Sidu. He finds Sidu's drawing related to the ancient treasure and decides to use Sidu to find it.

After twists of turns, Sidu's family find out him and relocates to Polpithigama as Sidu's wish. Soon, Sidu learns about the treasure and finds it, using his powers. He uses his power to help people. Meanwhile, Rohita tries to take away his son, Subodha Thero from temple to save his property. He seeks help from Nandipala for it when Subodha Thero's sister, Tharumini and her mother, Sumitra visit Rohita's father, Dissanayake as servants. Soon, Sumitra reveals her true identity and Dissanayake accepts them.

In this time, A witchcraft practised woman, Deepa comes to Sidu's village. She learns about Sidu's magic and tries to destroy his powers. But, it fails when Head Monk and Rahula Monk save Sidu. Enraged, Deepa puts Rahula Monk's life in danger. But, Head Monk learns about Deepa's power and destroys her plan. After that, Deepa fails again and loses her powers. Then, Rahula Thero recovers and returns to the temple.

One Day, Soratha Thero learns that Subodha Thero is Rohitha's son. Soratha Thero shocks and goes missing, shocking everyone. A guest hunter, Sisira finds unconscious Thero, who resembles his late son. He keeps Thero in his cave. Eventually, Sidu finds Thero with Sisira and brings them to temple.

Meanwhile, Ranga and Gayani's marriage is fixed by Dilum. Ranga forces Dilum to marry Theruni. Ranga-Gayani and Dilum-Theruni get married. After that, Sidu leaves the country. Dingiri's soul comes to meet Theruni as Poorna. Theruni practices ayurvedic from her.

Later, A puppet master, Mawathe enters to Polpithigama. He is revealed to be Malee's long-lost brother, Shakti. He falls in love with Tharuka, a school teacher. Finally, Nandipala turns good realizing his mistakes and Mawathe learns his truth from Theruni and Poorna.

== Cast ==
=== Main cast ===
- Nethma Aakashmitha as Sidu Bandara / Malitha (2016–2021)
- Kaveesh Vihanga as Soratha Thero (2016–2022)
- W. Jayasiri as Head Monk (2016–2022)
- Abhiman Praveen as Subhodha Thero (2018–2022)
- Indika Madurage as Rahula Monk (2017–2022)

=== Supporting cast ===
- Sena Gunawardena as Heen Baba (2016–2022)
- Shashika Peiris as Muthu (2018–2022)
- Maneesha Chanchala as Theruni Bandara (2016–2022)
- Yash Mihiran as Dilum Kulathunga (2016–2022)
- Kokila Pawan as Shakti "Mawathe" Mudunagala (2021–2022)
- Dilini Lakmali as Poorna (2021–2022)
- Rangi Rajapaksha as Tharuka (2021–2022)
- Shyran Silva as Sumangala Thero (2018–2021)
- Sanyumi Nimnadi as Tharumini Dissanayaka a.k.a. Gungi (2018–2021)
- Virajini Lenora as Sumitra Dissanayaka (2018–2021)
- Jayantha Muthuthanthri as Nandipala / Sumanasiri (2016–2021)
- Sudarshana Bandara as Rohitha Dissanayaka (2018–2021)
- Harshi Anjumala as Gayani (2016–2021)
- Jehan Srikanath as Ranga (2016–2021)
- Laal Sarath Kumara as Principal Kulatunga (2016–2021)
- Pavithra Wicramasinghe as Lalani Kulatunga (2016–2021)
- Pradeep Manawadu as Dara Pan (2016–2021)
- Buddhi Randeniya as Anoja (2017–2021)
- Wasanthi Ranwala as Kumari Dissanayaka (2018–2021)
- Janak Premalal as Mr. Dissanayaka (2018–2021)
- Anoma Pathirana as Mrs. Dissanayaka (2018–2021)
- Amanda Jayarathne as Rukshi (2020)
- Isuru Lankathilaka as Dushen (2020)
- Charith Senanayake as Subhash Ranasinghe (2020–2021)
- Dharshan Thavaraja as Varna (2022)

=== Former cast ===
- Samadhi Arunachaya as Malee Bandara (2016–2018; 2022)
- Sanketh Wickramage as Nirmal Bandara (2016)
- Gamini Hettiarachchi as Navaratne Bandara (2016–2019)
- Kumara Thirimadura as Sisira Bandara (2020)
- Milinda Madugalle as Asanga (2016)
- Imeshan Nelligahawatta as Heshan (2016)
- Nirukshan Ekanayaka as Pasan (2016)
- Sarath Chandrasiri as Ukkuwa (2016)
- Dhanushka Iroshini as Deepa Maniyo (2019–2020)
- Nadeesha Alahapperuma as Himali (2019–2020)
- Lakshan Wattuhewa as Jayampati (2019–2020)
- Vijaya Kangara as Muthugala (2016–2019)
- Nadeeshani Peliarachchi as IP Dulani Jayarathna a.k.a. Nilanthi / Rupika (2017–2018)
- Roshan Pilapitiya as Thilak Manchanayaka (2016–2018)
- Roshana Ondatji as Thamali Manchanayaka (2016–2018)
- Elisha Muzayana as Hiruni Manchanayaka (2016–2018)
- Kavindiya Dulshani as Anjana (2017–2019)
- Samantha Kumara Gamage as Reggie (2016–2020) (Dead)
- Princy Fernando as Siri Achchi (2016)
- Michelle Dilhara as Daylight fairy angel (cameo) (2018)
- Tashin Madhuka as Chutte (2016-2020)
- Jeewanthi Perera as Kanthi (2018–2020)
- Nigel Ranasinghe as Chankya (2020–2021)

== Critical response ==
Sidu teledrama became popular within a short time and the creator TV Derana claims that Sidu became the top-rated teledrama in Sri Lanka in 2016. But critics criticized the teledrama for excessively lengthy storylines and the use of Buddhist monastery in drama.

== Soundtrack ==
No.	Title	Singer(s)	Length
1.	"Randuwak Une Ne"	Yashodha Priyadarshani, Kaveesh Induwara	03:04
2.	"Handata Yanna"	Sithija Theekshana, Niwani Dedunusri, Rusiru Induwara, Sithumini Sulakkana	03:05
3.	"Hithata Aswesillak"	Umali Thilakarathne	04:05
Total length:			10:14

== See also ==
- Malee
