= Mandakini (1999 film) =

Mandakini මන්දාකිනි
- Directed by: H.D. Premaratne
- Written by: H.D. Premaratne
- Based on: Story by Benedict Dodampegama
- Produced by: Yasiru Multimedia (Pvt) Ltd.
- Starring: Ravindra Randeniya; Sabeetha Perera; Asoka Peiris; W. Jayasiri
- Cinematography: Suminda Weerasinghe
- Edited by: Elmo Haliday
- Music by: Rohana Weerasinghe
- Production company: Kwik Enterprise
- Release date: 3 December 1999
- Country: Sri Lanka
- Language: Sinhala
- Budget: Rs 15-20 million

Mandakini (The Milky Way) (Sinhala: මන්දාකිනි) is a 1999 Sri Lankan Sinhala drama film directed by H.D. Premaratne and executive production by Kithsiri Karunarathna. It stars Ravindra Randeniya and Sabeetha Perera in lead roles along with Asoka Peiris and W. Jayasiri. Music composed by Rohana Weerasinghe. It is the 925th Sri Lankan film in the Sinhala cinema.

== Production ==
Film was co-produced by director himself with a group of young Sri Lankans in Australia including Kithsiri Karunarathna, Wimal Samarasingha, Ujith Hewabasithage, Athula Ginige, Kamal Bandara, S.J. Sarath Kumara, Srilal Jayaweera and Lakshman Gamage. The world premiere was held in Sydney under the patronage of Australians and aborigines at Greater Union Theatre on 7 March 1999. It is the first Sri Lanka-Australia co-production. Two professional aborigine actors, Joe Horacek and Chris Johnson starring in the film as well as Veddhas in Sri Lanka.

The film has been shot in and around Sydney, Opera House and the harbour, Australia and locations of Blue Mountain in Katumba, Javis Bay and Redfern two prominent aborigines villages. Professor Sunil Ariyaratne and Vasantha Kumara Kobawaka worked as lyricists whereas Samitha Mudunkotuwa, Athula Adhikari and Athma Liyanage joined as playback singers. Wimal Samaranayake is the production manager while Lal Harindranath is the art director.

== Cast ==
- Ravindra Randeniya
- Sabeetha Perera
- Asoka Peiris
- W. Jayasiri
- Pradeep Senanayake
- Janaka Kumbukage
- Damitha Abeyratne
- Mahendra Perera
- Gnananga Gunawardana
- Sherani Wijesena
- Joe Horacek
- Chris Johnson
- Uruwarige Wannila Aththo
- Dambane Gunawardhana
