= Siri Raja Siri =

Siri Raja Siri සිරි රජ සිරි
- DVD poster
- Directed by: Somaratne Dissanayake
- Written by: Somaratne Dissanayake
- Produced by: Renuka Balasooriya; Somaratne Dissanayake
- Starring: Kokila Jayasuriya; Dilhani Ekanayake; Mahendra Perera
- Cinematography: Channa Deshapriya
- Edited by: Ravindra Guruge
- Music by: Rohana Weerasinghe
- Production company: Nimsara Enterprises
- Distributed by: EAP Theaters
- Release date: 6 March 2008
- Running time: 88 minutes
- Country: Sri Lanka
- Language: Sinhala

Siri Raja Siri, theatrically as Siri Raja Siri alias Kiri Ibbandeniye Maharajathuma, (Sinhala: සිරි රජ සිරි, romanized: King of Kiriibbandeniya) is a 2008 Sri Lankan Sinhala children's drama film directed by Somaratne Dissanayake and co-produced by himself with his wife Renuka Balasooriya. It stars Kokila Pawan Jayasuriya, Dilhani Ekanayake and Jayalath Manoratne in lead roles along with Mahendra Perera and Jayalath Manoratne. Music composed by Rohana Weerasinghe. The plot of the film received positive reviews. It is the 1102nd Sri Lankan film in the Sinhala cinema.

== Plot ==
Sirimal is a bright young poor boy living in a rural village area in Sri Lanka. When he passes the all-island scholarship exam with becoming the first place in the island, he wins a chance to attend a wealthy school in Colombo. Despite his many cries and tears to leave his hometown and family, he travels to Colombo with his father. Sirimal does well in the school, gaining many friends as well as a spoiled rival, Shehan.

When the School drama teacher announces about their annual Drama Competition, Sirimal is determined to get the main role, which is the King's role. However, he wins the role of his dreams, but he hasn't got enough money for the costume. Shehan, who also wanted that role, encourages Sirimal to swap roles, which is the Rajadrohiya's role. But Sirimal doesn't want to.

Sirimal and his best friend tries to earn money to buy the costume by doing part time jobs, such as shoe polishing and working in a store. But Sirimal's father insists they get help from the village's dancing teacher, who gives Sirimal his king costume. But the crown is too big for Sirimal.

The drama teacher tells Sirimal to make a ring out of cloth and cotton. After that he will be able to wear the crown no matter how big it is. On the day of the performance, Shehan steals the cotton ring from Sirimal while he's in the washroom. After a tearful tantrum, the drama teacher decides to give Shehan the king's role and Sirimal the cheap rajadrohiya role. Sirimal protests, but he gives an extraordinary performance as the Rajadrohiya and wins the best actor award. The film ends with Sirimal acting as the king in their village drama competition.

== Cast ==
- Kokila Jayasuriya as Sirimal
- Shehan Randeniya as Shehan
- Dilhani Ekanayake as Sirimal's mother
- Mahendra Perera as Gune, Sirimal's father
- Sharanya Jayakodi as Sirimal's sister
- Jayalath Manoratne as Weerasinghe, school's drama teacher
- Prasannajit Abeysuriya as Village school principal
- Sanath Gunathilake as Principal
- Rathna Lalani Jayakody as Class Teacher
- Giriraj Kaushalya as Theater controller
- Richard Manamudali as Television reporter
- Rohana Baddage as himself
- H. A. Perera as himself
- Charitha Priyadarshani as herself
- Chandrasoma Binduhewa as Drama Master
- Sampath Tennakoon as Shehan's father

== Soundtrack ==
No.	Title	Lyrics	Singer(s)	Length
1.	"Sara Sip Sayuru"	Somaratne Dissanayake	Harshana Dissanayake
2.	"Rupunoda Sindu"	Somaratne Dissanayake	Edward Jayakody

== Awards and nominations ==
The film won several awards at international film festivals.

Year	Nominee / work	Award	Result
2014	Dhaka International Film Festival	Best Audience Award for Best Film	Won
2008	Asia Pacific Screen Awards	Asia Pacific Screen Award for Best Children's Feature Film	Nominated
2008	Mexico International Children Film Festival	Jury Mention Award for Best Film	Won
2008	Lola International Children Film Festival	Silver Knobi Award for Best Film	Won
2008	Argentina International Children Film Festival	Signis Jury Award for the Best Film	Won
2008	Rimouski International Children Film Festival	CamerioHumanitas Award	Won
2008	Rimouski International Children Film Festival	Cifej Award	Won
2008	Chinese International Children Film Festival	Award for the Best Child Actor	Won
