= 21st Sarasaviya Awards =

1993 awards festival for Sinhala cinema

- Date: March 20, 1993
- Site: Bandaranaike Memorial International Conference Hall, Colombo 07, Sri Lanka
- Directed by: A. D. Ranjith Kumara

Highlights
- Best Picture: Kulageya
- Most awards: Kulageya (5)
- Most nominations: Kulageya

Television coverage
- Network: Associated Newspapers of Ceylon Limited

The 21st Sarasaviya Awards festival (Sinhala: 21වැනි සරසවිය සම්මාන උලෙළ), presented by the Associated Newspapers of Ceylon Limited, was held to honor the best films of 1992 Sinhala cinema on March 20, 1993, at the Bandaranaike Memorial International Conference Hall, Colombo 07, Sri Lanka at 6:00 p.m. Prime Minister D. B. Wijetunga was the chief guest at the awards nights.

The film Kulageya won the most awards with five including Best Film.

== Awards ==
Category	Film	Recipient
Best Film	Kulageya	A. A. Paige
Best Director	Kulageya	H. D. Premaratne
Best Actor	Umayangana	Joe Abeywickrama
Best Actress	Kulageya	Sriyani Amarasena
Best Supporting Actor	Me Waare Mage	Somy Rathnayake
Best Supporting Actress	Kulageya	Veena Jayakody
Best Emerging Actor	Sakkara Suththara	Bandula Dissanayake
Best Emerging Actress	Rajek Wage Puthek	Samantha Epasinghe
Best Script Writer	Kulageya	Tissa Abeysekara
Best Cinematographer (color film)	Sinhayangeth Sinhaya	M. A. Gafoor
Best Cinematographer (black n' white film)	Sisila Giniganee	Suminda Weerasinghe
Best Editor	Kulageya	Elmo Halliday
Best Art Direction	Muwan Palesse Kadira	Lionel Silva
Best Makeup Artist	Ahimi Dadayam	Ebert Wijesinghe
Best Sound Effects	Sisila Giniganee	Lionel Gunaratne
Best Music Direction	Muwan Palesse Kadira	Sarath Dassanayake
Best Lyricist	Umayangana	Sunil Ariyaratne
Best Male Playback Singer	Raja Daruwo	Gratien Ananda
Best Female Playback Singer	Okkoma Kanapita	Latha Walpola
Rana Thisara Award	contribution to Sinhala cinema	Iranganie Serasinghe
Rana Thisara Award	contribution to Sinhala cinema	Sumitra Peries
Merit Awards	Sayanaye Sihinaya	Jeevan Kumaratunga
Merit Awards	Sayanaye Sihinaya	Dilani Abeywardana
Merit Awards	Umayangana	Damayanthi Fonseka
Merit Awards	Raja Daruwo	Somapala Rathnayake
Merit Awards	Viyaru Minisa	Sugath Samarakoon

Category	Film
Popular films included in the festival
Popular films included in the festival	Raja Daruwo
Popular films included in the festival	Umayangana
Popular films included in the festival	Sinhayanth Sinhaya
Popular films included in the festival	Malsara Doni
Popular films included in the festival	Chandi Rejina
Popular films included in the festival	Okkoma Kanapita
Popular films included in the festival	Kulageya
