= Sarigama =

Sarigama සරිගම
- Theatrical release poster
- Directed by: Somaratne Dissanayake
- Written by: Somaratne Dissanayake
- Produced by: Cine Films Lanka
- Starring: Pooja Umashankar; Malini Fonseka; Ashan Dias
- Cinematography: Vishawa Balasooriya
- Edited by: Ajith Ramanayake
- Music by: Rohana Weerasinghe
- Release date: 2 December 2016
- Language: Sinhala

Sarigama (Sinhala: සරිගම, romanized: Sa Re Ga Ma) is a 2016 Sinhala musical film written and directed by Somaratne Dissanayake and produced by his wife Renuka Balasooriya for Cine Films Lanka. The film stars Pooja Umashankar and Ashan Dias as leading roles while Malini Fonseka and Gayani Gisantika also play key supporting roles. It was released on 2 December 2016 only on EAP 3D cinemas.

The film is an adaptation of the 1965 Oscar award-winning musical Sound of Music, which was based on the autobiography of Maria Von Trapp in 1949. Changes were made to suit the local setting, and the film avoids politics altogether; the film ends with the marriage of Maria and the Captain. The film was shot in picturesque hill country areas capturing the natural attractions of the island.

== Plot ==
Maria (Pooja Umashankar), a young and beautiful music-loving girl enters a convent with the intention of becoming a Catholic nun. Her playful behavior and strong desire to make music create difficulties with the convent's administration. She is sent away to become a governess to the seven children of a widowed ex-navy captain (Ashan Dias). Maria's playful friendliness towards the children and the very strict captain attracts the love of both the children and the captain, changing all of their lives.

== Cast ==
- Pooja Umashankar as Maria
- Ashan Dias as Captain Tony
- Gayani Gisantika as Sandra
- Somasiri Alakolnga as John
- Malani Fonseka as Reverend Mother
- Rathna Lalani Jayakody as Sister Rita
- Sakunathala Sathsarani as Sister Kathy
- Bhudhi Randheniya as Sister Lisa
- Sherin Ishani as Sister Sofia
- Narthana Dhilmini as Sister Eva
- Lalith Janakaantha as Max
- Ramya Wanigasekara as Dalcy
- Dasun Madusanka as Michael

=== Children ===
- Sinethi Akila as Olu
- Thisuri Anjali as Nelum
- Kaushalya Nirmana as Saman
- Milni Menaara as Manel
- Pramuditha Udayakumara as Sandun
- Menaaraa Thisanya as Kumudu
- Vethuli Umanya as Rosy

== Music ==
The film had music scored by Rohana Weerasinghe and director Somaratne Dissanayake wrote the songs. Thirteen songs were released onto CD and sold at cinemas where the film was playing. Singers included Nanda Malini, Edward Jayakody, Uresha Ravihari, Sashika Nisansala and Harshana Dissanayake. The titular song is based on "Do-Re-Mi".
