= Bindu (film) =

- part of a scene
- Directed by: Somaratne Dissanayake
- Written by: Somaratne Dissanayake
- Produced by: Renuka Balasooriya
- Starring: Sachin Chathuranga; Ruvindika Ishadini; Jayalath Manoratne
- Cinematography: Suminda Weerasinghe
- Edited by: Ravindra Guruge
- Music by: Rohana Weerasinghe
- Distributed by: EAP Theatres
- Release date: 23 September 2009
- Country: Sri Lanka
- Language: Sinhala

Bindu (Sinhala: බිංදු) is a 2009 Sri Lankan Sinhala children's film directed by Somaratne Dissanayake and produced by his wife Renuka Balasooriya for Cine Films Lanka. It stars Sachin Chathuranga and Ruvindika Ishadini in lead roles along with Jayalath Manoratne and Kumara Thirimadura. Music composed by Rohana Weerasinghe. The film revolves around a child boy and girl make an eternal relationship with a baby elephant Bindu and the consequences results from the relationship around them. The film has shot around Sigiriya.

== Cast ==
- Sachin Chathuranga as Muthu
- Ruvindika Ishadini as Malee
- Jayalath Manoratne as Kolamba haadaya
- Kumara Thirimadura as Saping
- Jayani Senanayake as Gune's wife
- Athula Liyanage as Wildlife officer
- Sarath Kothalawala as Minister
- Nilmini Buwaneka as Saping's wife

== Awards and nominations ==
Bindu won the Special Jury Award at the Lucas International Film Festival in 2011.
