= Sinhaya =

- promotional poster
- Directed by: V.Sivadasan
- Written by: V.Sivadasan (Dialogue)
- Produced by: Sunil T.Fernando
- Starring: Ranjan Ramanayake; Maheshi Madushanka; Sanath Gunathilake
- Cinematography: Sujith Nishantha
- Edited by: Nanda Nandi Jayakodi
- Music by: Somapala Rathnayake
- Release date: 30 March 2016
- Country: Sri Lanka

Sinhaya (Lion) is a 2016 Sri Lankan Sinhala-language drama film written and directed by V.Sivadasan and produced by Sunil T.Fernando for Sunil T. Films. The film features Ranjan Ramanayake, Maheshi Madushanka, Sanath Gunathilake and Duleeka Marapana in the lead roles. Featuring music composed by Somapala Rathnayake as his final composing before death and cinematography by Sujith Nishantha. The film was released on 30 March 2016. It is the 1247th Sri Lankan film in the Sinhala cinema. The film has influenced by Bollywood blockbuster Mr. India (1987 film).

== Plot ==
Weerasinghe (Ranjan) is a humble man who works as a tuition teacher and ensure the survival of ten homeless kids. The kids are caring by intellectually disabled female Punchi akka (Duleeka). Weerasinghe's father was a scientist who worked with Professor (Nadeeka) and ask Weerasinghe to achieve his father's legacy, but he refuse them. Meanwhile, Sabhapathithuma (Palitha), who is a cunny man. He starts to build a luxury hotel and get to know about the Weerasinghe's house. Sabhapathithuma send several his men several occasions to agree Weerasinghe to rent te house to him, but all refused by Weerasinghe. Meanwhile, a journalist Hasitha (Maheshi) also engaged with Sabhapathithuma by revealing his dirty works. She lives with homeless kids at Weerasinghe's home as a renter. After series of incidents, Weerasinghe starts to achieve his father's legacy and found a watch made by his father which has the ability to make invisible. He starts use it and find money for the survival of kids and attack thugs several times. One day Hasitha was kidnapped by Sabhapathithuma henchman and Weerasinghe survived her with the help of invisible watch. The news about invisible man named Sathyamithra spread quickly among others, but no one knows the real story of it. Finally, minister (Ravindra) came to the scene and blame Sabhapathithuma for his work and sacked him from his profession. Finally, the house totally belongs to Weerasinghe and kids starts to refer him as their father. Meanwhile, Hasitha also reveal her attraction to Weerasinghe and also about the truth of Sathyamithra.

== Cast ==
- Ranjan Ramanayake as Weerasinghe / Sathyamithra
- Maheshi Madushanka as Hasitha
- Sanath Gunathilake as Minister
- Ananda Wickramage as Newspaper chief editor
- Duleeka Marapana as Punchi akka
- Palitha Silva as Sabhapathithuma
- Mihira Sirithilaka as Mudalali
- Nadeeka Gunasekara as Professor
- Gayathri Dias as Manike
- Kokila Pawan Jayasuriya

== Soundtrack ==
No.	Title	Singer(s)	Length
1.	"Ra Tharu Nathi Ahase"	Suraji Shyamali & crew
2.	"Ale Dole Wana Wadule"	Vidusha Nethranjali, Anjana Yasiru, Maneesha Chanchala, Sathija Lakshan
3.	"Sanda Nagee Eliya Dei"	Maneesha Chanchala
