= Asoka Peiris =

Sri Lankan actor, director and composer

Asoka Peiris අශෝක පීරිස්
- Born: 1942; Moratuwa, Sri Lanka
- Died: 24 December 2007 (aged 65); Moratuwa
- Resting place: Holy Emmanuel Church Cemetery, Moratuwa
- Education: S. Thomas' College, Mount Lavinia
- Occupations: Actor, Dramatist, Director, Music director
- Years active: 1965–2011
- Spouse: Chithra Peiris
- Children: 3

Asoka Peiris (born 1942 – died 24 December 2007 as අශෝක පීරිස්) [Sinhala]), was a Sri Lankan actor in Sri Lankan cinema, stage drama and television. A highly versatile actor who mainly appeared in dramatic roles, Peiris is best known for the roles in Amba Yahaluwo and Guru Gedara.

== Personal life ==
Ashoka Peiris was born in 1942 in Moratuwa, Colombo. His father died when he was about 16 years old. His preliminary education was at Presbyterian Girls' High School, Dehiwela and Ferguson's Girls' High School under Ms. Brooks. Then he attended S. Thomas' College, Mount Lavinia for secondary education. He was married to Chithra Peiris and the couple had two sons, Prakash and Eshantha, and one daughter, Menaka. After the marriage, he worked at Wellawatta Spinning and Weaving Mills, where he met Lester.

He had 6 grandchildren. Amrith, Dharaka and Amandhi are the children of his older son Prakash. Emma is the daughter of his second son Eshantha. Meshaak and Mareesha are the children of his daughter Menaka.

He died on 24 December 2007 due to a heart attack at the age of 65. His funeral took place in Holy Emmanuel Church Moratuwa. He was buried at the Holy Emmanuel Church Cemetery on 29th Friday, 2007 at 3 pm.

== Acting career ==
In 1959, he produced a Sinhala play called Karolis and Porolis along with his friend Marapana during his last year at school.

He started his acting career with the stage play Pala Malla staged in 1965 with the main role. Then he acted in an English play directed by Lucien de Soyza. His maiden cinema acting came through Delovak Athara directed by Lester James Peries with a supportive role. His first main role in cinema was in Thana Giravi directed by Roy de Silva. In 1967, he directed the drama Sarana. In 1993, he won the Best Actor award at Sarasaviya Film Festival for his role in the film Guru Gedara.

In 1994, Peiris won the award for the Best Actor at Sarasaviya Film Festival for the role in Guru Gedara. He continued acting in some foreign movies such as Shadow of the Cobra and Death Stone. Some of his most critically acclaimed roles came through films including, Yuganthaya, Baddegama, Yahalu Yeheli, Viragaya and Maruthaya. His most notable television acting came through Amba Yahaluvo as Nelum Bandara, which became a cult in Sri Lankan television.

In 1994, he founded The Moratuwa Arts Forum (MAF), which launched many projects to identify Moratuwa talents and promote music. He worked as the chartered president of the forum from 1995 to 1996.

In 2004, he worked as the music composer of Jolly Boys and Haadu Wassak films.

=== Selected serials ===
- Amba Yahaluvo
- Asani Wasi
- Awasan Horawa
- Duvili Maliga
- Jeewa Chakra
- Mindada
- Rankira Soya
- Sathya
- Senehase Nimnaya
- Sihinayak Paata Paatin
- Wara Peraliya

== Filmography ==
Year	Film	Role	Ref.
1966	Delowak Athara	Factory walker	
1981	Baddegama	Mr. Perera	
1982	Thana Giravi	Doctor	
1982	Yahalu Yeheli	Simeon	
1984	Maya	Bandu	
1985	Yuganthaya		
1987	Sathyagrahanaya	Journalist Dharme	
1987	Death Stone		
1987	Viragaya	Sammy	
1989	Manika, une vie plus tard		
1990	Dese Mal Pipila		
1990	Hima Hira		
1991	Ali Baba Saha Horu Hathaliha		
1992	Sisila Gini Gani	Frank Dunuwila	
1993	Guru Gedara	Principal Ariya Bandara	
1993	Surabidena	Dunwila	
1994	Pawana Ralu Viya		
1995	Maruthaya	Wickramaratne	
1996	Anantha Rathriya	Wickie Fernando	
1998	Gini Avi Saha Gini Keli	Oscar	
1999	Mandakini		
2000	Saroja	Boutique owner	
2000	Chakrayudha		
2001	Kinihiriya Mal	Renuka's father	
2001	Poronduwa	Doctor Ajith	
2002	Thahanam Gaha	Roland Wijewardena	
2007	Nisala Gira		
2010	Kawulu Dora		
2010	Kshema Bhoomi	Bandara	

== See also ==
- Cinema of Sri Lanka
