= Malee =

TV series in Sri Lanka

- title card
- මලී
- Genre: Mystery; Thriller Romantic
- Created by: Sunanda de Silva
- Directed by: Nimal Ratnayake
- Starring: Duleeka Marapana; Samadhi Arunachaya; Sanketh Wickramage; Sarath Chandrasiri; Ananda Wickramage
- Voices of: Nanda Malini
- Theme music composer: Aruna Gunawardena
- Opening theme: Sanda Malee Mage
- Composer: Janaka Fonseka
- Country of origin: Sri Lanka
- Original language: Sinhala
- No. of episodes: 476

Production
- Executive producer: Janaka Siriwardena
- Editor: Jagath Weeratunga
- Camera setup: Suranjith Kumara
- Running time: 17 to 20 minutes

Original release
- Network: TV Derana
- Release: 24 January 2011 – 14 December 2012

Related
- Aththamma (Malee 2); Sidu (Malee 3); Shakthi (Sidu 2)

Malee (Sinhala: මලී) is a 2011 Sri Lankan mystery thriller teledrama broadcast on TV Derana. The series is produced by Janaka Siriwardena and directed by Nimal Ratnayake. It initially aired from every Monday to Thursday from 7:30 pm to 8:00 pm but later changed to weekdays from 9:00 pm to 9:30 pm. The series was followed by three more seasons - Aththamma (Malee 2), Sidu (Malee 3) and Shakthi (Sidu 2).

It stars Duleeka Marapana in the lead role along with newcomers Samadhi Arunachaya and Sanketh Wickremage in supportive roles. The show became popular and was nominated for Sumathi Awards and Raigam Tele'es in many award categories.

== Seasons ==
Season	Title	No. Episodes	Originally aired	
Season	Title	No. Episodes	First aired	Last aired
1	Malee	476	24 January 2011	14 December 2012
2	Aththamma	440	18 March 2013	28 November 2014
3	Sidu	1402	8 August 2016	7 January 2022
4	Shakti	402	10 January 2022	4 August 2023

== Plot ==
Malee, who has wizarding powers which cures people practices Ayurvedic from her mother, Dingiri who is a Ayurvedic doctor in a rural village, Mudunagala. Nirmal, the divisional secretary in Mudunagala, is bitten by a snake. Malee removes poisons in Nirmal's leg and brings him to her home for treatment. Dingiri cures him and Malee befriends with Nirmal. She receives a marriage proposal from Kusumsiri.

Dingiri's cousin, Ukkuwa is a witchcraft practiced man. He uses his wizarding powers for bad things. Unable to defeat Dingiri, Ukkuwa hates her and tries to stop the birth of grandson to Dingiri's family because he knew that, if Dingiri had a grandson he must be powerful beyond all. To stop Malee's marriage, Ukkuwa kills Kusumsiri.

Eventually, Nirmal and Malee fall for each other and get married. Ukkuwa's son, Nandipala comes to Mudunagala and starts learning palmistry. Soon, Malee gets pregnant and suffers from an excessive abdominal pain. Nirmal informs it to Dingiri, who checks Malee and realizes that Ukkuwa is trying to kill their unborn child. To save child's life, Dingiri decides to separate the baby from Malee and Nirmal for 21 years after birth. Nirmal and Malee are shocked on learning that and Dingiri advices them to keep away from village. Dingiri informs this to her close friend Yasa and her daughter Muthu, who is Malee's friend. Then, Muthu pretends as pregnant in front of villagers on Dingiri's guidance.

However, Malee delivers a baby girl and Dingiri informs them to come to Jaya Sri Maha Bodhi with baby. Next Day, They come with baby while Muthu is also come with Dingiri. Dingiri takes the baby from Malee and gives Muthu to take care. Malee and Nirmal bid an emotional farewell to them and move to England.

== Cast and characters ==
=== Main cast ===
- Duleeka Marapana as Dingiri Mudunagala – An ayurvedic doctor; Malee and Shakti's mother
- Samadhi Arunachaya as Malee Bandara – Dingiri's daughter, Shakti's sister, Nirmal's wife
- Sanketh Wickramage as Nirmal Bandara – Navaratne and Geeta's son, Malee's husband
- Sarath Chandrasiri as Ukkuwa – Dingiri and Malee's foe, Nandipala's father
- Gamini Hettiarachchi as Navaratne Bandara – Nirmal's father

=== Supportive cast ===
- Sarath Karunarathne as Kusumsiri – Malee's former fiancé (Dead)
- Ananda Wickramage as Rajaratne
- Shashika Peiris as Muthu – Malee's friend, Suranga's wife
- Kokila Pawan as Shakti Mudunagala – Dingiri's son; Malee's brother
- Jayantha Muthuthanthri as Nandipala – Ukkuwa's son
- Hashinika Karaliyadde as Nandipala's wife
- Princy Fernando as Siri – Ukkuwa's helper
- Ajith Lokuge as Village councilor
- Nimal Yatiwella as Councilor's friend
- Sathyajith Wedisinghe as Minister
- Niluka Rekhani as Vajira – Minister's wife
- Janaka Kumbukage as Saliya – Madhrangi's father
- Sandhani Sulakna as Madhurangi – Nirmal's friend who worked as a journalist
- Rohani Weerainghe as Chitrangani – Madhurangi's mother
- Isuru Lokuhettiarachchi as Piyaratne
- Malkanthi Jayasinghe
- Shan Bandu Weerasinghe
