= Distant Teardrop =

- Directed by: Padmakumar Narasimhamurthy
- Written by: Padmakumar Narasimhamurthy
- Produced by: Karan Arora; Nishant Kaushik; Satish Kaushik
- Cinematography: Padmakumar Narasimhamurthy
- Edited by: Sanyukta Kaza
- Music by: K Krishna Kumar
- Production company: Picture Thoughts Production
- Distributed by: The Sathish Kaushik Entertainment
- Release date: 18 April 2019
- Running time: 97 minutes
- Countries: India; Sri Lanka
- Language: Hindi
- Budget: $600,000 (estd.)

Distant Teardrop is a 2019 Indian drama film written and directed by Padmakumar Narasimhamurthy and produced by Satish Kaushik under the banner of The Satish Kaushik Entertainment. The film stars Sri Lankan actor Ravindra Randeniya and Indian actor Arjun Chidambaram in lead roles. At the heart of the story is the Tamil-Sinhala conflict. It could be a metaphor for the Israel-Palestine conflict, the Hindu-Muslim conflict in India, the Black and White conflict in America, another father and son tale, is preparing its Indian release. The film premiered in late 2019.

75% of the filming has been filmed in Sri Lanka, and remaining were shot in England and Russia.

== Cast ==
- Arjun Chidambaram as Suresh
- Nithyashri as Gowri
- India Odedra as Sanouber
- Asghar Mohammed Rana as Gowri's father
- Musa Tariq as Shaanth
- Marcia Tucker as Mrs. Edwards
- Aditya Odedra as Adi
- Khushi Modhwadia as Arjun's Niece
- Kunal Modhwadia as Arjun's Nephew
- Shivam Keshwala as Student
- Jonny Deepu James as Aravind
- Sarah T. Cohen as Pregnant Wife
- Atul Sharma as Doctor
- Crystal Wingx as Sikh's Wife
- Karlina Grace-Paseda as Floor Manager
- Ravindra Randeniya
- Sangeetha Weeraratne
- Paul Kaye as Policewoman
- Lampros Kalfuntzos as Lampros
- Ranji Vijayan as Saravanan
