= Nayanathara Wickramarachchi =

Sri Lankan actress

Nayanathara Wickramarachchi නයනතාරා වික්‍රමආරච්චී
- Born: 22 January 1998 (age 28); Sri Lanka
- Education: Sadalanka Maha Vidyalaya; Madduma Bandara Maha Vidyalaya, Weliweriya
- Occupation: Actress
- Years active: 2015–present

Nayanathara Wickramarachchi (born 22 January 1998) is an actress in Sri Lankan cinema and television. Voted the Most Popular Actress at the Raigam Tele'es for three consecutive years, she has also won the Most Popular Actress award at the Sumathi Awards and the SLIM-Nielsen Peoples Awards for five consecutive years.

== Personal life ==
Nayanathara Wickramarachchi was born on 22 January 1998 as the second child in her family. She has an elder sister. Her mother is Samanthi Sadanayaka. Having received her education at Sadalanka Maha Vidyalaya, she later attended Madduma Bandara Maha Vidyalaya in Weliweriya, where she completed her G.C.E. Ordinary Level and G.C.E. Advanced Level examinations.

== Career ==
Before starting her professional acting career, she studied acting at the Maya Shakti Theatre Studio, conducted by Dharmajith Punarjeeva. Although she first appeared on stage in an adaptation of German playwright Bertolt Brecht's play Ragena Avi Mamada Emi, she was unable to devote time to theatre thereafter.

She commenced her television acting career in 2015, appearing in several television serials telecast on various channels, including Hansa Pihatu, directed by Jayaprakash Sivagurunadan, Meedumen Eha, Eran Landu, and Praana. However, her career breakthrough came with her outstanding performance as "Dewmi" in the TV Derana teledrama Deweni Inima. Her role became immensely popular, winning her national accolades and multiple Most Popular Actress awards for consecutive years.

In 2017, she won the Most Popular Actress award at both the Raigam Tele'es and the Sumathi Awards.

In 2018 and 2019, she won the award for the Year's Most Popular Actress at the SLIM-Nielsen Peoples Awards.

She made her feature film debut in the 2018 romance film Eka Dawasaka Api, directed by Anuruddha Jayasinghe, marking her first cinematic experience.

== Television ==
Year	Title	Channel
2019	Hansa Pihatu	Sirasa TV
	Meedumen Eha	
	Eran Landu	
2023	Praana	Sirasa TV
2017–present	Deweni Inima	TV Derana
2023	Jeewithaye Ek Dawasak	ITN
2026	Husmak Lagin	TV Derana
2021	Piyabana Munissam	Sirasa TV
2025	Sathi	Rupavahini

== Filmography ==
Year	Film
2018	Eka Dawasaka Api
2018	Girivassipura
2022	CineMa
2024	Passport

== Awards ==
Year	Award Ceremony	Category	Nominated Work	Result
2016	Raigam Tele'es	Most Popular Actress	Deweni Inima	Won
2017	Raigam Tele'es	Most Popular Actress	Deweni Inima	Won
2017	Sumathi Awards	Most Popular Actress	Deweni Inima	Won
2018	Raigam Tele'es	Most Popular Actress	Deweni Inima	Won
2018	SLIM-Nielsen Peoples Awards	Teledrama Actress of the Year	Deweni Inima	Won
2019	7th Derana Lux Film Awards	Upcoming Actress	Eka Dawasaka Api	Won
2019	SLIM-Nielsen Peoples Awards	Teledrama Actress of the Year	Deweni Inima	Won
