= Senaka Batagoda =

Sri Lankan singer (1958–2024)

Senaka Batagoda සේනක බටගොඩ
- Born: 25 June 1958; Seeduwa, Gampaha, Sri Lanka
- Died: 11 September 2024 (aged 66); Ragama, Sri Lanka
- Occupations: Singer, composer, guitarist
- Musical career
- Genres: Rock; pop rock; soft rock; folk
- Instruments: Vocals, Guitar
- Years active: 1980–2024
- Label: MEntertainment

Senaka Batagoda (Sinhala: සේනක බටගොඩ; 25 June 1958 – 11 September 2024) was a Sri Lankan singer and music composer. He has sung numerous songs in his singing career, where he rose to prominence and limelight for his ability to deliver songs with a mix of unique blend of folk influences, versatile vocals, and mastery of various genres. He is often referred as "The Ancient of Our Time", where Batagoda had the best touch with emotional audience among the Sri Lankan western music culture after Clarence Wijewardena.

== Personal life ==
Senaka Batagoda was born on 25 June 1958 in Seeduwa, Gampaha, Sri Lanka.

== Musical career ==
From his childhood, Batagoda had a special interest in singing and playing drums. Before his solo career, Batagoda was a member of the band Chandimal and the Second Connection in 1980. He released his first song composition in 1994. In 2011, fellow musician Sangeeth Wijesuriya released the song Api Kawuruda along with his new musical band "Wayo". The song became very popular among the public. It was later revealed that the original song was sung by Senaka Batagoda, where he later received immense popularity. Since then, he dominated both indoor and outdoor musical shows and his songs have been highly popularized in mass audience. Then in 2014, his song Api Senasille was released by Wayo.

In mid 2010s, he formed his own musical band "Pace". Batagoda received his first feature film playback singing opportunity through the film CineMa.

== Court order ==
On 3 April 2024, an enjoining order was issued by the Colombo Commercial High Court preventing Batagoda from singing seven popular Sinhala-language songs including "Api Kavuruda", "Api Senasille", "Alu Yata Gini", "Rastha", "Heena Walata Panak Thiyenawa", "Senasuma" and "Hodama De". The court proceeded following a complaint filed under the Intellectual Property Act by musician Janath Kulathilake who insisted to restrain Senaka from singing his songs. Janath made such complaint indicating that Batagoda had violated his intellectual property right and copyright by not allocating the economic benefits due to him and also sought a maximum compensation of roughly 100 million from Batagoda as a remedy.

== Death ==
Batagoda had undergone two surgeries due to a condition in his leg at the Ragama hospital. After the second operation, he developed respiratory distress and later died on 11 September 2024, at the age of 66. His remains were laid to rest at Jayaratne Flower Hall, Borella for public honours.

== Discography ==
- "Abhimanawath Lesa"
- "Alu Yata Gini"
- "Api Kavuruda"
- "Api Senasille"
- "Bidagena Yamu"
- "Elakkaya"
- "Guru Pata Handewa"
- "Heena Walata Panak Thiyenawa"
- "Hodama De"
- "Jeeiwithe Mal Warusawak"
- "Kakuli"
- "Kunkuma Thilakaya"
- "Nidi Nathi Reya"
- "Obawa Soya"
- "Rastha"
- "Senasuma"
- "Sihina Mawannethi"
- "Sitha"
