= Gamini Hettiarachchi =

Sri Lankan actor (1950–2019)

Gamini Hettiarachchi ගාමිණී හෙට්ටිආරච්චි
- Born: Gamini Chandrakirthi Hettiarachchi; 24 July 1950; Nawala, Sri Lanka
- Died: 27 May 2019 (aged 68); National Hospital of Sri Lanka, Colombo
- Education: Nalanda College Colombo
- Occupations: Actor, Dramatist
- Years active: 1974–2018
- Known for: Film, Drama Acting
- Spouse: Subhashini Hettiarachchi (m. 1983)
- Children: Prathibha; Shakthi
- Parents: Stanley Alas Hettiarachchi (father); Soma Hettiarachchi (mother)

Gamini Chandrakirthi Hettiarachchi (24 July 1950 – 27 May 2019) (Sinhala: ගාමිණී හෙට්ටිආරච්චි) was an actor in Sri Lankan cinema, stage drama and television.

== Personal life ==
Hettiarachchi was born on 24 July 1950 as the sixth of the family with ten siblings for Stanley Alas Hettiarachchi and Soma Hettiarachchi. He has three elder brothers, two elder sisters, two younger sisters and two younger brothers. He was educated at Nalanda College, Colombo and completed his GCE A/L education through science stream. He was a retired Technical officer in Department of Railways.

He was married to Subhashini in 1983 and had one daughter and one son. He met Subhashini during Shilpa Shalikawa program held in Lionel Wendt.

He died on 27 May 2019 while receiving treatment, after a kidney transplant surgery.

== Beyond acting ==
In the school, he was a member of Under-14 cricket team and karate team. During Advanced Levels in the school, he started to read Russian books particularly on politics. Then he obtained the membership of Communist Party.

== Acting career ==
Whilst at College, he performed in Ediriweera Sarachchandra's stage drama, Raththaran. Also whilst a pupil at Nalanda, he acted in Dhamma Jagoda's play Vesmuhunu. In 1974, he engaged in street dramas under the guidance of Gamini Haththotuwegama and performed in Minihekuta Ellila Marenna Barida? and Bosath Dakma. His first main role in stage dramas came through 1976 drama Sekkuwa. He won a merit award for the role at National Drama Festival. Some of his other popular stage dramas include Wedikkarayo, Suba Sandewak, Mee Pura Wasiyo, Uththamawi, Esala Sanda Awanhala, Hora Police, Charitha Hathak and Dummala Warama.

His first teledrama acting came through Yashorawaya with the character Sunimal. Then he appeared in many television serials such as Sihina Puraya, Pahasara and Sidu. In 1991, he won the award for the Best Actor for his role in the Dadabima teledrama.

=== Selected television serials ===
- Abuddassa Kalaya
- Ada Ada Ei Maru
- Anavaratha
- Aththamma
- Bhavana – Amuttha
- Bhavathra
- Bonikko
- Dadabima
- Dadu Kete
- Dangakara Tharu
- Deva Daruwo
- Gini Pupuru
- Girikula
- Ingammaruwa
- Kinduru Adaviya
- Makara Dadayama
- Malee
- Medagedara
- Millewa Walawwa
- Nil Mal Viyana
- Oru Bendi Siyambalawa
- Pabalu
- Pahasara
- Raja Bhavana
- Senehasa Kaviyak
- Senehasata Adarei
- Sidu
- Sihina Puraya
- Sihina Sithuvam
- Sulang Kapolla
- Swarna Veena
- Vinivindimi
- Yashorawaya
- Yes Boss

== Filmography ==
He started cinema career with the short film Palamuwaniya Saha Anthimaya in 1980 and then through Hemasiri Sellapperuma's 1992 film Bajar Eke Chandiya. His most popular cinema acting came through the films Kosthapal Punyasoma in 2014, Vidhu and Sinhawalokanaya.

Key
†	Denotes films that have not yet been released

Year	Film	Role	Ref.
1992	Bajar Eke Chandiya		
1995	Ayoma		
2001	Aswesuma	Complaint officer	
2002	Bahubuthayo	Red shirt friend	
2005	Samanala Thatu	Balloon businessman	
2010	Vidhu	Principal	
2011	Sinhawalokanaya	Subey	
2012	Super Six	Jude's Father	
2014	Kosthapal Punyasoma	Sargent Wickrampala	
2018	Nidahase Piya DS	Commentator	
2022	CineMa		
TBA	Rosa Kale Api Yan †		
