= Eka Dawasaka Api =

- Sinhala: එක දවසක අපි
- Directed by: Anuruddha Jayasinghe
- Written by: Anuruddha Jayasinghe
- Produced by: Vinode Productions
- Starring: Pubudu Chathuranga; Nayanathara Wickramaarachchi; Medha Jayaratne
- Cinematography: Chinthaka Somakeerthi
- Edited by: Ajith Ramanayake
- Music by: Navaratne Gamage
- Production company: TVT studio
- Distributed by: CEL Theatres
- Release date: 1 February 2018
- Country: Sri Lanka
- Language: Sinhala

Eka Dawasaka Api (The Day We Will) (එක දවසක අපි) is a 2018 Sri Lankan Sinhala romantic film directed by Anuruddha Jayasinghe, produced by Vinode Productions and Executive Producer Arosha Fernando for Universal Media. It stars Pubudu Chathuranga and newcomer Nayanathara Wickramaarachchi in lead roles.. Music composed by Navaratne Gamage. The film has been shot around central hills of Sri Lanka, from Mahiyangana, Mawanella and the surrounding areas of Kandy and Peradeniya meanwhile in University of Peradeniya.

The muhurat ceremony was celebrated at the Regal Theatre, Colombo. The film was released on 1 February 2018 for a limited period in 40 film theaters across Sri Lanka in the CEL Film Circuit. The film was also will be available in Dialog's Vinode mobile app as well. It is the 1295th Sri Lankan film in the Sinhala cinema.

== Plot ==
Film starts with the sound of Mala Beraya (Drum which is playing for funeral) and aimed to Parami and Vimukthi. Both gathered in the city and get to the train for their journey as they discussed.

== Cast ==
- Pubudu Chathuranga as Vimukthi
- Nayanathara Wickramarachchi as Parami
- Veena Jayakody as Vimukthi's mother
- Medha Jayaratne as Vimukthi's sister
- Nayana Hettiarachchi as Parami's aunt
- Disni Rajapaksa as Nishu, Vimukthi's proposed girl
- Rohan Ranatunga as Vimukthi's friend
- Gayan Hettiarachchi
- Pavithra Wickramasinghe as Kusum, Nishu's mother
