= Thahanam Gaha =

Thahanam Gaha තහනම් ගහ
- Directed by: Christy Shelton Fernando
- Written by: Christy Shelton Fernando
- Produced by: Winson Films
- Starring: Anoja Weerasinghe; Cyril Wickramage; Dilhani Ekanayake
- Cinematography: Andrew Jayamanne
- Edited by: Elmo Halliday
- Music by: Sarath Wickrama
- Distributed by: CEL Circuit
- Release date: 18 July 2002
- Country: Sri Lanka
- Language: Sinhala

Thahanam Gaha (Forbidden Tree) (Sinhala: තහනම් ගහ) is a 2002 Sri Lankan Sinhala political thriller film directed by Christy Shelton Fernando and produced by Ranjith K. Perera for Winson Films. It stars Anoja Weerasinghe, Cyril Wickramage and Dilhani Ekanayake in lead roles along with Asoka Peiris and Shashi Wijendra. Music composed by Sarath Wickrama. It is the 1165th Sri Lankan film in the Sinhala cinema.

== Cast ==
- Anoja Weerasinghe as Seetha, Nirmala's mother
- Asoka Peiris as Roland Wijewardena
- Sunethra Sarachchandra as Helen
- Cyril Wickramage
- Dilhani Ekanayake as Nirmala
- Shashi Wijendra as Wasantha
- Razi Anwar
- Sumana Gomes
- Indrajith Navinna
- Richard Weerakody
- Bandula Suriyabandara
- Sarath Silva

== Soundtrack ==
No.	Title	Singer(s)	Length
1.	"Sihinen Suwadak Wage"	Karunarathna Divulgane, Pradeepa Dharmadasa
2.	"Neela Wana Rekhawa"	Nanda Malini, Ivo Denis
3.	"Thahanam Deshaye"	Ivo Denis, Nanda Malini, Karunarathna Divulgane, Pradeepa Dharmadasa
4.	"Sadarala Peralena"	Nanda Malini, Ivo Denis
