= Priyani Jayasinghe =

Sri Lankan songstress (1967–2018)

- ප්‍රියානි ජයසිංහ
- Born: Priyani Jayasinghe; 10 June 1967; Panadura, Sri Lanka
- Died: 8 July 2018 (aged 51); Colombo, Sri Lanka
- Education: Walana Mahanama Maha Vidyalaya, Panadura
- Spouse: Prabath Rasika Eaton
- Children: 2
- Relatives: Rohana Weerasinghe (uncle)
- Musical career
- Genres: Pop; soul; rhythm and blues; Indian classical music
- Instrument: Vocals
- Years active: 1990–2018
- Labels: Nilwala; Ransilu; Evoke

Priyani Jayasinghe (Sinhala: ප්‍රියානි ජයසිංහ; 10 June 1967 – 8 July 2018) was a Sri Lankan singer and composer. One of the most popular artists in Sri Lanka, Jayasinghe has sung several popular songs of the Sinhala music industry including: Kandula Niwannam, Sundara Hadakata Dee and Aluth Sanda Awith.

== Personal life ==
She was born on 10 June 1967 in Panadura, Sri Lanka. She completed education from Walana Mahanama Maha Vidyalaya, Panadura. Her uncle Rohana Weerasinghe is a musician and composer in Sri Lanka.

She was married to Prabath Rasika Eaton, who later had a dispute with her. The couple had two sons. During her demise, she lived with her younger son Lochana Nimuth Eaton, whereas her older son Loshitha Hasarel Eaton studied in Japan. Her husband worked as a cushion workshop assistant for many years.

Although she has made a name for herself in the field as a popular singer, she is said to have received no support from her husband for her talent or for those activities. As a result, she was involved in music concerts and other art activities, nurtured her two children and fulfilled their responsibilities alone.

== Singing career ==
She became a popular figure in school stage where she won singing awards in island wide level. Then she studied music under D.W. Medagoda. She started singing career in early 1990s, where she went to music classes conducted by Edward Jayakody and Wijesena Kodippili. She entered the radio and became an A grade singer at SLBC. During this period, she met the musician Ashoka Kovilage. Kovilage composed two songs: Kandula Niwannam, Senehasa Illa Liyathambara in 1987 where he was looking for a suitable voice for the song Kandula Nivannam. Finally, Kovilage gave the song to Jayasinghe which became highly popular and made her mark in Sinhala music industry. When the song was sung at concerts and festivals, there was a great response from the audience. At one party in Boralesgamuwa, she was asked to sing the song three times a day.

After the success of the song, she recorded the song Sundara Hadakata which became very popular. With those songs, she later released her first music CD "Kandula Niwannam" and made a disc in 1996. Then she made her second cassette tape "Sundara Hadakata". Her first concert was held in 1992 and the second was in 2011. On 2 January 2016, she performed her third concert with her elder son with the title "Sundara Hadakata" which was held at 6.00 pm at Panadura Town Hall. In the meantime, she also sang a duet Durin Uwath Oba with elder son.

== Death and aftermath ==
On 8 July 2018, Panadura police found her stabbed and critically injured at home around 8:45 p.m. where she was rushed to the hospital. She died after being admitted to the Kalubovila Hospital due to her injuries at the age of 51. The murder was claimed to be done by her husband Prabath using a pair of scissors and killed in her home. Her postmortem examination was held at the Panadura hospital. Remains were laid to rest on 10 July from 10 am at No. 546/1 Alubogahalandawatta Kuda Arukgoda, Panadura. Final rites were held at the Minuwanpitiya cemetery in Panadura on 12 July 2018.

According to the police, Jayasinghe and her husband had longstanding disputes where several police complaints were recorded. Accordingly, although several complaints were lodged with the Panadura South Police regarding family disputes, the Minor Complaints Division had summoned both parties, resolved the issues and sent them back. About ten such complaints had been reported to the police and the last complaint alleging that her husband had assaulted her was about a year and a half ago. The police acted in this regard and reported the case against her husband to the court on the charge of domestic violence and the trial court had ordered the husband to be barred from entering and living in his wife's house for a year.

She had obtained a restraining order against husband many times, which expired on 7 July 2018. Around 8.30 pm Jayasinghe was at her residence in her room with baby two-month-old grandchild and daughter-in-law, Rashini. Her younger son had gone to the shop. During this period, her husband entered her room and stabbed her using a pair of scissors. After the stabbing, he fled the scene. Meanwhile, daughter-in-law heard her scream and ran to get help from the neighbor. When they arrived, they saw her body lying on the bed in a pool of blood with several stab wounds. Then daughter-in-law contacted her son and rushed Jayasinghe into the hospital. She sustained eight serious injuries in eight places including her neck, chest, abdomen, chin, head and lungs and five other cuts.

After investigations, Panadura South Police was able to arrest her husband near Panadura railway station. On 10 July he was produced before Panadura Magistrate Court and later remanded till 13 July 2018. He later confessed his murder and possible suspicious behavior of Jayasinghe.
