= Samantha Epasinghe =

Sri Lankan actress (1967–2021)

- සමන්තා ඈපාසිංහ
- Born: 11 April 1967
- Died: 3 October 2021 (aged 54); Horana Base Hospital, Horana, Sri Lanka
- Education: Dharmapala College, Pannipitiya
- Occupation: Actress

Samantha Epasinghe (Sinhala: සමන්තා ඈපාසිංහ; 11 April 1967 – 3 October 2021), also known as Samantha Diyasena Liyanage, was an actress in Sri Lankan cinema, theatre and television.

== Career ==
Epasinghe began her acting career with the play 'Muhuda Mudra' and was joined on the small screen by Lucien Bulathsinhala and Bandula Vithanage. She acted in teledramas and few films in her career. She won the Best Emerging Award at the 21st Sarasaviya Awards in 1993 for her performance in the film Rajek Wage Puthek (1992).

== Filmography ==
- 1990 - Walavuve Hanu
- 1991 - Kelimadala
- 1992 - Sathya
- 1992 - Sayanaye Shihinaya
- 1992 - Rajek Wage Puthek
- 1994 - Vijaya Geetha
- 1996 - Thunweni Aha
- 1996 - Loku Duwa
- 1996 - Sihina Vimane Raja Kumari
- 1997 - Puthuni Mata Wasana
- 1997 - Raththaran Minihek
- 2008 - Ai Oba Thaniwela

== Death ==
She died on 3 October 2021, at the age of 54 from COVID-19. She underwent treatment at the Horona Base Hospital after being diagnosed with COVID-19 and illness.

== See also ==
- List of Sri Lankan actors
