= Ravindra Randeniya =

Sri Lankan actor and politician

The Honorable Ravindra Randeniya
- රවීන්ද්‍ර රන්දෙණිය

Member of Parliament for Gampaha District
- In office 2001–2004
- Majority: 56,449 Preferential Votes

Member of Parliament for National List
- In office 2000–2001

Personal details
- Born: Liyanage Boniface Walter Perera; 5 June 1945 (age 81) Dalugama, Kelaniya, British Ceylon
- Spouse: Preethi Pramila (m. 1974)
- Children: Sachindra Nirmal; Sameera Manabarana; Umayangana Indrachapa
- Occupation: Actor, politician, businessman
- Known for: Desa Nisa

Liyanage Boniface Walter Perera (born 5 June 1945), popularly known by his stage name Ravindra Randeniya, is a Sri Lankan actor and former politician. He rose to fame in Lester James Peries's film Desa Nisa in 1975, and was a popular actor during the 1970s and 1980s; He won the Sarasaviya Best Actor Award in 1984 (Dadayama), 1985 (Maya), 1989 (Sandakada Pahana), and 1990 (Sri Medura).

Randeniya hosted the quiz program Mind Star on ITN, which gain huge publicity.

== Personal life ==
Randeniya was born in Dalugama, Kelaniya Sri Lanka on 5 June 1945 as the second child in a family with 6 siblings. His father, L.P. Perera was a well-known businessman in Dalugama, Kelaniya who was popular in the brass hinge industry. His mother was Caroline Egodawatte, born in Sapugaskanda. Ravindra has one elder brother: Callistus, two younger sisters: Gertie, Helen, and two younger brothers: Amal and Shantha.

Randeniya attended St. Benedict College in Kotahena. His beloved friend was his classmate Vijaya Kumaratunga. Though he was a good student, he failed to pass his A-level examination and didn't pursue higher education. Randeniya instead joined his family business of manufacturing hardware products.

Dalugama was a small village filled with paddy fields and streams. Randeniya appreciated nature growing up often spending evenings looking over the fields; he was also an avid reader from a young age immersing himself in the works of acclaimed Sinhala authors like Martin Wickremasinghe, Prof.Ediriweera Sarachchandra, Kumaratunga Munidasa, and Wimalaratne Kumaragama.

Randeniya is married to fellow actress Preethi Pramila Seneviratne, and the wedding ceremony was celebrated on 31 October 1974. They have two sons, Sachindra Nirmal and Sameera Manabarana and one daughter Umayangana Indrachapa. Preethi Randeniya is a poet and an author of children's books.

== Career ==
He gave priority to studies over art and at school, he acted as 'Kashyapa' in the school play Sigiriya Kashyapa. He excelled in writing short stories and won the first prize in the short story competition organized by the College Literary Society in 1962. Both Kumaratunga and Randeniya were introduced to art and literature by Wilfred Perera, a well-known school teacher and a staunch leftist who was the brother of dramatist Anthony C. Perera.

In his free time, Randeniya started taking courses in theater decor and screenwriting at Lionel Wendt Theatre Workshop. Randeniya became interested in acting while taking a required general acting class under Dhamma Jagoda; he gradually became fascinated with the idea of acting over the two years he spent at the school. He joined the Lionel Wendt Art Gallery in 1969, to learn drama, screenplay, direction and stage decoration. Randeniya got his first starring role in the student production Mudu Puththu directed by Gallapaththi at the age of 25. Veteran photographer Ralex Ranasinghe baptized Boniface as 'Ravindra Randeniya'.

His performance in the film drew praise from well-known director Lester James Peries. He next appeared in Kalu Diya Dahara, considered "a watershed in the annals of Sinhala films", which dealt with a struggle between workers and administration in a tea plantation. It was made in 1971 and shown nationwide in 1974. Peries, who was a fan, picked Randeniya for one of the three main roles in Desa Nisa alongside Joe Abeywickrema and Sriyani Amarasena. This would be his breakthrough role, and established him as a popular actor when screened in 1975. The 1989 film Siri Medura was the most difficult role for Randeniya. He played Sampath Hamu, a man with complete paralysis. He later won the Sarasaviya Award for Best Actor for this role in 1990, naming him as the first unanimous decision of the jury without recommendation.

== Political ==
Later Randeniya was elected to Sri Lanka Parliament for United National Party. He served as a member between 2000 - 2004.

== Filmography ==
In a career spanning more than 5 decades, Randeniya has acted in more than 100 films across many genre.

Key
†	Denotes films that have not yet been released

Year	Film	Role	Ref.
1974	Kalyani Ganga	Namal's friend	
1974	The God King	Mogallana	
1975	Tharanga	Ravindra Randeniya	
1975	Kalu Diya Dahara		
1975	Desa Nisa	Hermit	
1976	Ganga		
1976	The God King	Mogollana	
1976	Duhulu Malak	Rohan Atukorale	
1976	Hariyata Hari	Piyal	
1976	Pembara Madhu		
1977	Siripala Saha Ranmenika	Siripala	
1977	Yakadaya	Siripala	
1978	Reincarnation		
1978	Veera Puran Appu	Puran Appu	
1978	Seetha Devi	Lakshman 'Lal'	
1979	Higana Kolla	Sir Henry Wijekoon	
1979	Wasanthaye Davasak	Wasantha	
1979	Chuda Manikyaya	Ivan	
1979	Sugandi	Susantha	
1979	Podi Malli	Siripala 'Siri' Rathnasingha	
1979	Hari Pudumai	Ravi	
1980	Ektem Ge	Sarath	
1980	Muwan Palassa II		
1980	Raja Dawasak		
1981	Thawalama	Sikuru Aththo	
1981	Ranga	Ranga / Chaminda 'Punchi Hamu' / Sanath Hamu	
1981	Sathweni Dawasa	Arachchila Muththusami	
1981	Bamba Ketu Hati	Nihal	
1981	Eka Dawasak Re	Jayantha 'Jaya' Jayadeva	
1981	Ridee Thella		
1981	Induta Mal Mitak		
1981	Sathara Diganthaya		
1981	Aradhana	Senaka	
1982	Sandaa	Seneviratne	
1982	Bambara Geethaya	Ravi	
1982	Ra Manamali	Jagath	
1982	Paaramitha	Kamal	
1983	Ran Mini Muthu		
1983	Yali Pipunu Malak		
1983	Dadayama	Weerasinghe Arachchilage Priyanka Jayanatha	
1983	Mal Madhu		
1983	Muwan Palassa III		
1983	Monarathanna 2		
1983	Hithath Hodai Wadath Hodai		
1983	Muhudu Lihini	Sarth	
1985	Deweni Gamana	Saman's brother	
1984	Bambara Patikki		
1985	Hithawathiya	Sarth	
1985	Hima Kathara	Sir Charles	
1985	Maya	Ananda	
1985	Channai Kello Dennai		
1985	Doringe Sayanaya		
1985	Karadiya Walalla		
1987	Maldeniye Simion	Dayaratne	
1986	Jaya Apatai		
1986	Koti Waligaya	Doctor Ravindra	
1986	Der Stein Des Todes	Vic	
1986	Pooja		
1986	Sura Saradiel	Saradiel	
1987	Witness a Killing		
1986	Adara Hasuna		
1987	Janelaya	Mr. Weerasinghe	
1987	Thaththi Man Adarei		
1987	Mangala Thagga	Nihal Perera	
1987	Kele Kella	Koti Albert 'Wimal'	
1987	Raja Wedakarayo	Inspector Kapila	
1987	Ahinsa	Party guest	
1988	Sandakada Pahana	Suranga Wijebandara	
1988	The Iron Triangle	(Production coordinator)	
1988	Angulimala	Ahinsaka/Angulimala	
1988	Kedapathaka Chaya		
1988	Sagara Jalaya	Mudalali	
1989	Siri Medura	Sampath Samarawickrama	
1990	Saharawe Sihinaya		
1990	Hima Gira	Sumith Abeypitiya	
1991	Golu Muhude Kunatuva		
1993	Gurugedara	Arjuna Wimaladharma	
1993	Surabi Dena	Keerthi	
1993	Madara Parasathu	Keerthi	
1994	Nohadan Landune		
1994	Dhawala Pushpaya	Doctor Nalin	
1994	Pavana Raluviya		
1994	Aragalaya	Gajanayake	
1994	Aathma		
1994	Sudu Piruwata	Jagath Ediriweera	
1995	Seilama	Sira	
1995	Sudu Valassu		
1996	Cheriyo Darling	Professor	
1996	Madhuri	Wickie 'Loku Hamu'	
1997	Yasoma		
1997	Ramba Saha Madhu		
1997	Les Mysteres Du Sadjurah	Colonel Taradjahi	
1997	Mother Teresa: In the Name of God's Poor	Police Commissioner, Calcutta	
1997	Bawa Duka	Muhandiram	
1997	Bawa Karma	Muhandiram	
1997	Ninja Sri Lanka		
1999	Anduru Sewaneli		
1999	Theertha Yathra	Mr. Sooriyabandara	
1999	Mandakini		
2000	Saroja	Major Fernando	
2001	Anantha Rathriya	Suwisal Abeysekara	
2001	Poronduwa	Vijendra Rambukwalla	
2001	Aswesuma	Doctor Thilakawardena	
2002	Sansara Prarthana		
2003	Wekande Walauwa	Lucas	
2004	Mille Soya	Kingsley	
2003	One Shot	Police officer	
2003	Mother Teresa of Calcutta	Inspector Shankar	
2005	Aksharaya	father, Retired High Court Judge	
2006	Nilambare	Jayasuriya	
2006	Sewwandi	Priyantha	
2007	Nisala Gira	Minister Saliya	
2008	Puthuni Hambagiya	Lawyer Weeratunga	
2008	Aba	Pandula Brahmin	
2009	Dancing Star		
2009	Juliya		
2012	Matha	Brigadier	
2012	Kusa Pabha	King Okkaka	
2014	Rupantharana	Brigadier Vimal	
2014	Parapura	Minister Rajamanthri	
2016	Weerawarna	Prasad Madugalla	
2016	Paththini	Pandya King	
2016	Sujatha Puthra	Minister	
2017	Ali Kathawa	Hermit	
2017	Nimnayaka Hudekalawa	The Client	
2018	Wassanaye Sanda	Sandesh's father	
2019	Distant Teardrop		
2019	Gaadi	Ehelepola Adigar	
2020	Rookada Panchi	cameo role	
2024	Ridee Seenu		

=== Selected Telivison Serials ===
- Bhavathra
- Deweni Gamana
- Ganga Addara
- Kahala Nadaya
- Kula Kumariya as Edward Deraniyagala
- Piyabana Ashwaya
- Sudu Samanaliyak
- Sherlock Holmes

== Awards ==
=== Presidential Film Awards ===
Year	Nominee / work	Award	Result
1980	Podi Malli	Merit Award	Won
1983	Paramitha	Merit Award	Won
1984	Dadayama	Best Actor	Won

=== Sarasaviya Awards ===
Year	Nominee / work	Award	Result
1984	Dadayama	Best Actor	Won
1985	Maya	Best Actor	Won
1989	Sandakada Pahana	Best Actor	Won
1990	Siri Medura	Best Actor	Won
1996	Seilama	Best Actor	Won
1998	Bawa Duka	Best Supporting Actor	Won

=== Sumathi Awards ===
Year	Nominee / work	Award	Result
2002	Contribution to cinema	U.W. Sumathipala Lifetime	Won
2011	Mind Star quiz program	Jury Appreciation	Won

=== Raigam Tele'es ===
Year	Nominee / work	Award	Result
2015	Contribution to cinema	Prathibha Prabha Lifetime	Won

=== Derana Film Awards ===
Year	Nominee / work	Award	Result
2025	Contribution to cinema	Derana Film Awards Lifetime Achievement	Won

=== Hiru Golden Film Awards ===
Year	Nominee / work	Award	Result
2016	Contribution to cinema	Hiru Lifetime Achievement	Won
