= Vidhu (film) =

Vidu
- Sinhala: විදු
- Directed by: Asoka Handagama
- Written by: Asoka Handagama
- Produced by: Silumina Films
- Starring: Chandani Seneviratne; Thanishka Vimalarathne; Gamini Hettiarachchi
- Cinematography: Channa Deshapriya
- Edited by: Ravindra Guruge
- Music by: Kapila Pugalarachchi
- Distributed by: CEL Theaters
- Release date: 10 December 2010
- Country: Sri Lanka
- Language: Sinhala

Vidu (My Kind of Hero) (Sinhala: විදු), colloquially as Vidhu, is a 2010 Sri Lankan Sinhala children's film directed by Asoka Handagama and co-produced by Iranthi Abeyasinghe, Jagath Wijenayaka, Prashant Rathi, Kanwar Inder Singh Rai and Prasanna Vithanage for Silumina Films. It stars Chandani Seneviratne and child actor Thanishka Vimalarathne in lead roles along with Gamini Hettiarachchi and Saumya Liyanage. Music composed by Kapila Pugalarachchi. It is the 1149th Sri Lankan film in the Sinhala cinema.

== Plot ==
An adolescent boy with no birth certificate, denied access to free education. He overwhelms the whole country and achieves what he has been dreaming in daylight.

== Cast ==
- Thanushka Vimalarathne as Vidu
- Chandani Seneviratne as Vidu's mother
- Saumya Liyanage as Politician
- Shamila Nimanthi Frenando as Chathu
- Gamini Hettiarachchi as Principal
- Himasal Liyanage as Politician's son

== Soundtrack ==
No.	Title	Singer(s)	Length
1.	"Devakathawala Nisollasawala (Hero of My World)"	Nelu Adhikari, Kapila Pugalaarachchi, Gayathri Ekanayake, Isuru kondasinghe, Prasad Samaratunga
