= Sisila Giniganee =

Sisila Gini Gani සිසිල ගිනි ගනී
- Directed by: Prasanna Vithanage
- Written by: Roy de Silva; K. D. Nicholas
- Based on: Story by Sanath Gunathilake
- Produced by: Ajanee Films
- Starring: Sanath Gunathilake; Sabeetha Perera; Veena Jayakody
- Cinematography: G. Nandasena
- Edited by: Elmo Halliday
- Music by: Sangeeth Wickramasinghe
- Distributed by: CEL Theatres
- Release date: January 17, 1992
- Running time: 90 minutes
- Country: Sri Lanka
- Language: Sinhala

Sisila Gini Gani (Fire on Ice) is a 1992 Sri Lankan, Sinhala language film. It was the first film directed by Prasanna Vithanage. The film stars Sanath Gunathilake and Sabeetha Perera in lead roles along with Veena Jayakody and Asoka Peiris.

Sisila Gini Gani had a short run in Sri Lanka. The music for the film was composed by Dr. Premasiri Khemadasa. It made a great impression on the audience. The film won 9 OCIC awards in 1992 including Best Director, Best Actor and Actress, 7 Swarna Sanka Awards including Best Director and 2 Sarasavi Awards. The film was screened again at the Regal Cinema Colombo on a limited engagement basis in October 2002.

== Plot ==
Harris Makalanda is a wealthy aristocrat and well known lawyer. He is also a married man to Kumari. One day he meets a beautiful girl, Annette, at a party. He meets her again when she hitches a ride with him during a heavy rain storm, which leads to a sexual encounter between them.

She is of Sri Lankan Burgher ethnicity; her family background and experiences with married men convince her to shun marriage, which she sees as imprisonment. As their liaison grows, Harris invites Annette to live in his separate bungalow, which she agrees to. Along with renovating the dilapidated bungalow, Annette seems to renovate her notion on marriage, and expresses this to Harris.

Meanwhile, Harris is contesting the municipal elections, at the urging of his wife and in-laws. His schedule leaves him no time for Annette but she continues to relish his company. The only obstacle in Annette's path to possessing Harris, completely and permanently, is Harris' little boy, Vijitha. Harris' son has special needs, acting as the glue in Kumari and Harris' marriage of convenience.

Annette tries to establish a rapport with the son. Once when the child goes on a picnic with his school friends, Annette separates him from the others as a sudden mist rolls in. Frightened, the child runs away. She sees him heading for the abyss but as hard as she tries, she is unable to stop him. This is the crux of the movie, allowing the story to pivot into flashbacks and flash forwards.

== Cast ==
- Sanath Gunathilake as Harris Makalanda
- Sabeetha Perera as Annette
- Veena Jayakody as Kumari Makalanda
- Asoka Peiris as Frank Dunuwila
- Tony Ranasinghe as Inspector Arthur Silva
- Hemasiri Liyanage as Missionary
- Thalatha Gunasekara as Mrs. Dunuwilla
- Jayalath Manoratne as Medawatta
- G.W. Surendra as Newspaper editor
- Nawanandana Wijesinghe as Martin
- Chandani Seneviratne as Nun
- Neil Alles as Opposition Leader
- Dilani Abeywardana as TV announcer
- Daya Thennakoon as Watchman
- Indrajith Navinna as Bystander
- Ebert Wijesinghe

== Awards ==
- OCIC Awards 1992
  - Best Director
  - Best Actress
  - Best Actor
  - Best Supporting Actress
  - Best Music Director
  - Best Cameraman
  - Best Art Director
  - Best Laboratory Work
- Swarna Sanka Awards 1992
  - Best Film
  - Best Director
  - Best Actress
  - Best Music Director
  - Best Cameraman (Black and White)
  - Best Art Director
  - Best Producer
