= Jayalath Manoratne =

Sri Lankan dramatist (1948-2020)

- ජයලත් මනෝරත්න
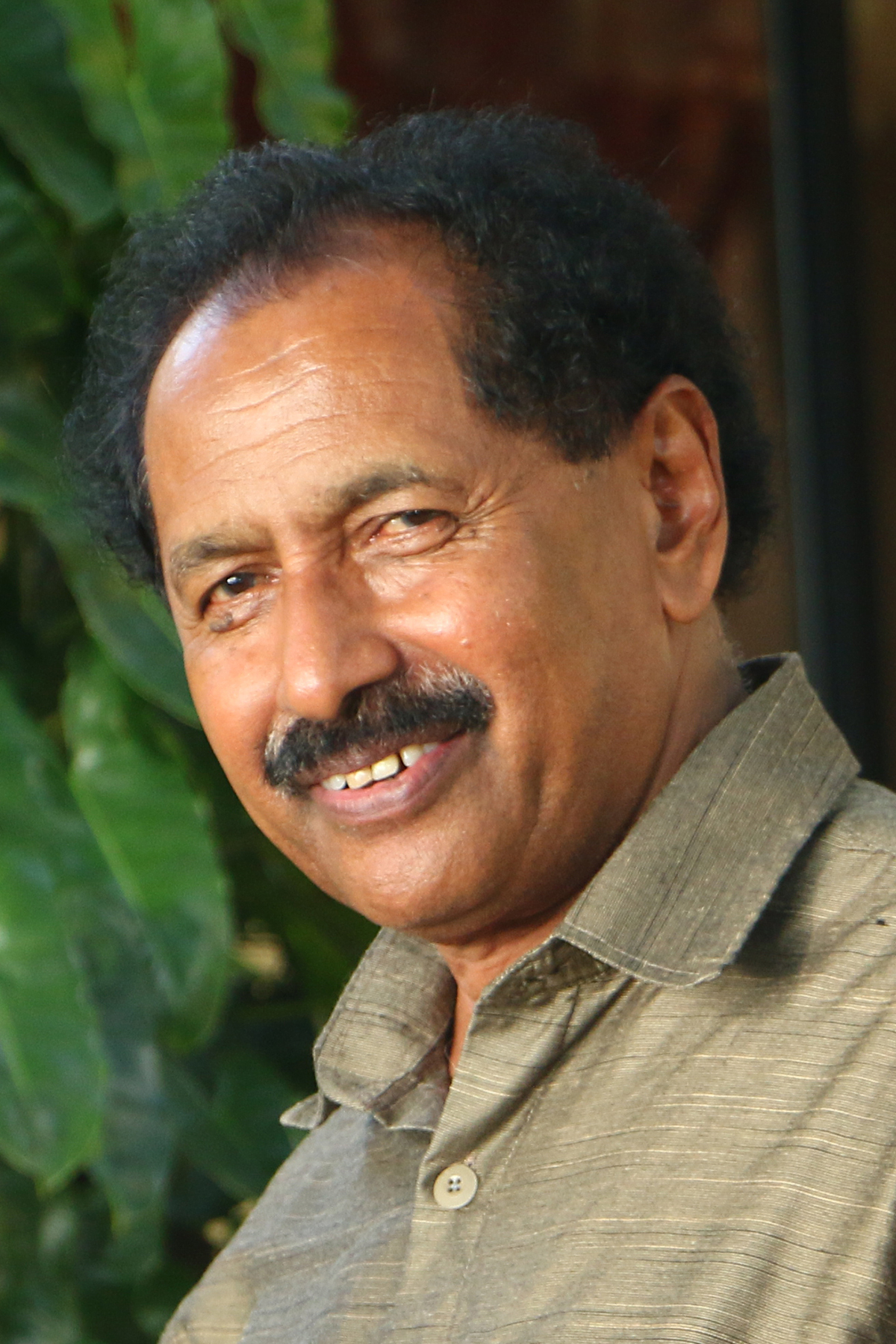
- Born: Keselgaspe Manatunga Jayalath Manoratne; 12 June 1948; Nuwara Eliya, Sri Lanka
- Died: 12 January 2020 (aged 71); Maharagama, Sri Lanka
- Education: Poramadulla Central College
- Alma mater: University of Peradeniya; University of Sri Jayewardenepura
- Occupations: Dramatist, Actor, Singer
- Years active: 1970–2019
- Spouse: Tamara Jayanthi (m. 1979)
- Children: 2
- Parents: Manatunga Perera (father); Leela Kumari (mother)
- Awards: Best Actor; Best Supporting Actor; Best Comedy Actor
- Website: http://jayalathmanorathna.org/

Keselgaspe Manatunga Jayalath Manoratne (Sinhala: කෙසෙල්ගස්පේ මනතුංග ජයලත් මනෝරත්න; 12 June 1948 – 12 January 2020) was an actor in Sri Lankan cinema, stage drama and television. He was a lecturer by profession as well as a director and producer. A highly versatile actor from drama to comedy, Manoratne won awards at OCIC (International Catholic Organization for Cinema and Audiovisual), Presidential, Sarasaviya, Raigam Tele'es, Sumathi and the State Literary and Drama festivals. He was the best actor back to back in 1991 and 1992 for his performance in Socrates and Dvitva. He is considered by critics as one of the five actors who have dominated the Sri Lankan Stage.

He died on 12 January 2020 while receiving treatment for cancer at the age of 71.

== Personal life ==
Manoratne was born on 12 June 1948 in Dehipe, Nuwara Eliya as the youngest son in the family of six children. His father Keselgaspe Manatunga Perera was a lorry driver and his mother Agalakotuwa Herath Mudiyanselage Leela Kumari was a housewife. He undertook his education at the Dehipe Primary School and Poramadulla Central College. Jayalath has three brothers, Manatunga Seneviratne, Manatunga Wijeratne and Manatunga Ariyaratne and two sisters, Indra Kumari and Mallika Kumari.

At an early age, his music teacher, Sunil Sriyananda, recognised his abilities and encouraged him to take up acting and singing. During his school times, he engaged in several educational as well as extracurricular activities such as Secretary of the Sinhala Literary Association (1965), President of the Theater Council (1966), President of the Sinhala Association (1967–68) and Committee member of the Drama Board and Gandharva congregation (1969). Manoratne was the Student Leader at Boys' Hostel in 1965–66. In 1966, he became the Senior Most Valuable Player in College Inter-Athletic Championship.

After completing his secondary education with Geography, Sinhala and Buddhist Civilization for G.C.E A/L, he attended the University of Peradeniya, where he continued to study drama under the guidance of Professor Ediriweera Sarachchandra. Manoratne completed his master's degree from the University of Sri Jayewardenepura, also obtaining a PhD. He was the only postgraduate to obtain a First Class Degree in 1995. In 2013, he accepted an honorary Doctorate (D. Litt) from the University of Peradeniya. In 1981, he completed an external diploma in Rural Development from the University of Colombo.

He was married to Tamara Jayanthi since 1979 to his death. The couple has one daughter, Uthpala Indeewari and one son, Bhanuka Prabuddha. Uthpala is married to Shivanka Perera and Bhanuka is married to Hiranya Dulashini Gamaariya.

== Stage drama career ==
In 1966 Manoratne started acting when he was a school student, making his acting debut in the stage drama Aspha Gudung, which was selected for the finals of the annual provincial inter-school drama competition and won the Certificate of Excellence in Performance at the All Island Inter-School Drama Competition.

Originally playing minor roles in plays as Maname, Sinhabahu under Sarachchandra's guidance, Manoratne embarked on a mainstream acting career, beginning with the operatic play Premato Jayati Soko with the role "Uddala Bamuna". Whilst performing in this play he met his future wife, Tamara Jayanthi. Manoratne went to Nuwara Eliya Kachcheri to get a job and at that time, he produced remakes of Sarachchandra's plays Raththaran and Elowa Gihin Melowa Awa. He has acted under all the five major stage drama directors in Sri Lankan history - Sarachchandra, Sugathapala de Silva, Dayananda Gunawardena, Gunasena Galappatty and Henry Jayasena.

In 1980, he produced his maiden theater play Mahagiri Damba. His only translation drama play came through Puthra Samagama produced in 1985. It is the adaptation of Russian play The Elder Son by Alexander Vampilov. In 1988, he produced the popular play Thalamala Pipila and then Andarela in 1993. The play Andarela also brings Manoratne's first documentary role. In 1996 he produced Guru Tharuwa and then Sanda Gira in 1998. He continuously produced plays of many genres in following years including Kaneru Mal (2000), Lokaya Thani Yayak (2005), Makara remake (2007), Sudu Redi Horu (2008), Buruwa Mahaththaya (2012), Sellam Nirindu (2013) and Handa Nihanda (2016). During the 26 consecutive years from 1980 to 2016, he made nearly 15 plays.

From that time on Manoratne acted in over 80 plays, and directed eleven plays of his own. His play Andarela won the State Literary Award in 1995 and then Guru Tharuwa won State Literary Award in 1996.

In 2014, Manoratne performed in a theater festival named Dawas Pahalos Daha (fifteen thousand days), which showcased a collection of eight plays representing different periods and issues and produced by Manoratne himself. These eight stage plays were Lokaya Thani Yayak, Sellam Nirindu, Thalamala Pipila, Buruwa Mahaththaya, Guru Tharuwa, Andarela and Puthra Samagama.

=== Notable stage dramas ===
- Ahas Maliga
- Andarela
- Andirale Nadagama
- Angara Ganga Gala Basi
- Ape Panthi Kamaraya
- Api Gewanne Na
- Asaatha Manthare
- Aspha Gudung
- Buruwa Mahaththaya
- Chitrage Prema Kathawa
- Debiddo
- Diwes Helanu Mena
- Don Juan
- Dunna Dunu Gamuve
- Dvitva
- Elowa Gihin Melowa Awa
- Gajaman Puwatha
- Guru Tharuwa
- Handa Nihanda
- Hiru Nathi Lowa
- Horu Samaga Heluwen
- Jasaya Saha Lenchina
- Kaneru Mal
- Lokaya Thani Yayak
- Lucinde
- Maala Walalu
- Maa Wani Bilinda
- Madhura Javanika
- Madhura Pura
- Magul Prastava
- Maha Giri Damba
- Mahe Hene Kathawa
- Maha Hene Riri Yaka
- Mahasara
- Makara
- Maname
- Mayadevi
- Megha
- Modara Mola
- Naaga Gurula
- Nari Bena
- Nariya Saha Keju
- Nelum Pokuna
- Oththukaraya
- Pematho Jayathi Soko
- Perahera Enawo
- Pokuru Wassa
- Puthra Samagama
- Raassa Saha Paraassa
- Raththaran remake
- Ratu Hattakari
- Rhinoceros
- Sahathika Nokala Maranayak
- Sanda Gira
- Sapiriwara Mathin
- Satha Saha Satha
- Sathuru Mithuru
- Sellam Nirindu
- Serade Seetha
- Sihina Sappuwa
- Sinhabahu
- Siri Sangabo
- Socrates
- Subhasadhaka
- Subha Saha Yasa
- Suddek Oba Amathai
- Sudu Redi Horu
- Tharavo Igilethi
- Thawath Udesanak
- Thala Mala Pipila
- Ukdandu Ginna
- Wasudeva
- Wessanthara
- Yathra

== Television ==
Manoratne started his television career with the drama Aebeddiya of Parakrama Niriella. Then he showcased his ability through many serials such as Doo Daruwo, Sindui Bindui, Gamperaliya. His role as "Punsiri" in Doo Daruwo became highly popularized. He became popular in comedy roles in Bodima and then in Ramya Suramya. In 2005, Manoratne played triple roles for the first time in Sri Lankan teledrama history in a miniplay directed and scripted by himself, titled Thunpath Ratawaka Lassana. In 2006, he directed the serial Mage Kaviya Mata Denna.

Apart from acting, Manoratne also directed many television serials such as Sekku Gedara, Ransirige Sangramaya, Mage Kaviya Mata Denna, Thunpath Ratawaka Lassana, Eeye Ada Saha Heta and Thaththe Api Awa. He also directed single episode miniplays such as Bappage Paminima, Aege Awurudda, Raja Thun Kattuwa, Nidahasa, Seettuwa, Denna Demallo, Sathuru Mithuru, Duppathunda Adaraya Karathi, Santhapaya and Buddha Puthra.

=== Selected television serials ===
- Abeddiya
- Arungal
- Bodima
- Bumuthurunu
- Deiyo Sakki
- Deweni Yuddhaya
- Deweni Gamana
- Doo Daruwo
- Doratu Rakinno
- Dumriya Andaraya
- Eeye Ada Saha Heta
- Gal Pilimaya Saha Bol Pilimaya
- Gajaman Nona
- Gamperaliya
- Ganga Saha Nissanka
- Hath Pana
- Hiru Sandu Hamuwe
- Hiruta Muwawen
- Irata Handana Mal 2
- Jeewithaya Dakinna
- Kande Gedara
- Madol Doowa
- Mage Kaviya Mata Denna
- Manik Nadiya Gala Basi
- Man Nathida
- Minissu
- Moragiri Kanda
- Nomerena Minissu
- Nopipena Mal
- Passe Gena Manamali (1989)
- Pateelage Kathawa
- Pawara Menuwara
- Punchi Patau
- Ramya Suramya
- Ranketi Doni
- Roda Hatara Manamalaya
- Sabanda Eliyas
- Sakisanda Eliyas
- Samanali
- Sanda Amawakai
- Sandara Vandana
- Sasara Sanda
- Saradiel
- Sedona
- Senehasata Amanthranayak
- Sindui Bindui
- Sooriya Kusuma
- Thunpath Ratawaka Lassana
- Uthuwankande Sura Saradiyel
- Veeduru Mal
- Vinivindimi
- Visithunweni Horawa
- Walakulu
- Wanabime Sirakaruwo
- Warna
- Wetath Niyarath
- Weten Eha

== Radio Play ==
- Tharuwan Saranai
- Bashmanthara

== Author works ==
- Dolos Mahe Pahana
- Dawasa Thawamath Tharunai
- Minihata Ninda Yanda Ati
- Piyadasa saha Kumariya
- Sindu Bindu
- Sinhala Naatye Prasangika Kalathmaka Wardhanaya
- Wahi Enathuru

== Illness and death ==
Manoratne suffered from a brain cancer for sometime. On 13 November 2018, he was admitted to a private hospital, Colombo at 2.00 p.m and underwent a surgery for a brain tumor. After the surgery he continued to work in dramas for a brief period, when the illness got worse. He continued to take medical treatment from Apeksha Cancer Hospital, Maharagama since mid 2019. On 12 January 2020, he died while receiving treatment at the hospital. Funeral took place on 15 January 2020 and cremated at Boralesgamuwa.

== Filmography ==
Manoratne started his cinema career with a minor role in Thilaka and Thilaka in 1979. Then he entered professional cinema acting through the 1979 film Handaya which was directed by Titus Thotawatte. Since then, he has acted in more than 30 films across many genres of drama, romance, thriller and comedy. He was a recipient of Kalasuri and Kala Keerthi due to his enormous contribution to the drama career. Some of his notable films include Sooriya Arana, Ho Gaana Pokuna, Bherunda Pakshiya and Walapatala, where he was awarded for best actor and best supporting actor in many ceremonies. His final film act came through Theja Iddamalgoda's debut film Ashavari.

Key
†	Denotes film or TV productions that have not yet been released

Year	Film	Role	Ref
1976	Thilake Ha Thilaka	Thilake's supporter	
1979	Handaya	Race commentator	
1980	Siribo Ayya	Malhami	
1981	Saranga		
1982	Jeewithayen Jeewithayak		
1983	Muhudu Lihini		
1986	Prarthana		
1986	Athuru Mithuru		
1987	Mangala Thegga	Srilal	
1987	Hitha Honda Chandiya		
1990	Hima Gira		
1991	Sthree		
1992	Sisila Gini Gani	Medawatta	
1992	Umayangana	Henry	
1993	Saptha Kanya	Jagath	
1996	Thunweni Aehe		
1999	Rathu Aluyama		
2002	Punchi Suranganavi	English teacher	
2003	Sudu Kaluwara	Podi Nilame Appuhami	
2004	Premawanthayo		
2004	Sooriya Arana	Chief Monk	
2004	Gini Kirilli		
2005	Sudu Kalu Saha Alu	Koragramaya	
2005	Samanala Thatu	Hospital keeper	
2006	Bherunda Pakshiya		
2006	Hiripoda Wassa	Sithum's father	
2008	Siri Raja Siri	Drama teacher	
2008	Walapatala	Victor Jayasundara	
2009	Bindu	Kolamba Haadaya	
2010	Bambara Walalla	Podi Eka's uncle	
2012	Daruwane	Vajirasena	
2015	Pravegaya	Saranapala, Hemal's father	
2015	Ho Gaana Pokuna	Bus driver Justin	
2016	Zoom	Scientist	
2017	Dedunu Akase	Vihangi's father	
2017	A Level	Uncle	
2018	Vaishnavee	Father	
2018	Goal	Mr. Samarasekara	
2019	Thaala	Principal, Mr.Hewanayake	
2020	Miss Jenis	Liyon aka 'Jenis'	
2022	Ashawari	Station master, Ashawari's father	
2023	Vedi Nowadina Lamai		
2023	Deweni Yuddhaya		
2023	Kathuru Mithuru	Samson 'Taylor'	
2025	Ice Cream		
TBA	Suvisi Vivarana †		

== Awards and accolades ==
He has won several awards at the local stage drama festivals and television festivals, both for acting and direction.

- State Literary Awards – for his two books Andarela and Guru Tharuwa
- Manoratne's script Thalamala Pipila is prescribed for G.C.E O/L syllabus.

=== State Literary Awards ===
Year	Nominee / work	Award	Result
1974	Rathu Hattakari	Best Actor	Won
1985	Puthra Samagama	Best Actor	Won
1988	Thalamala Pipila	Best Actor	Won
1988	Thalamala Pipila	Best Director	Won
1988	Thalamala Pipila	Best Script	Won
1990	Socrates	Best Actor	Won
1991	Dvitva	Best Actor	Won
1993	Andarela	Best Script	Won
1995	Andarela	Best Play	Won
1996	Guru Tharuwa	Best Script	Won
1996	Guru Tharuwa	Best Play	Won

=== Sarasaviya Awards ===
Year	Nominee / work	Award	Result
1988	Mangala Thegga	Best Supporting Actor	Won
2004	Sudu Kaluwara	Best Supporting Actor	Won
2007	Berunda Pakshiya	Best Supporting Actor	Won
2015	Ho Gaana Pokuna	Best Supporting Actor	Won

=== Raigam Tele'es ===
Year	Nominee / work	Award	Result
2009	Arungal	Best Actor	Won
2013	Service to the drama	Prathibha Prabha Award	Won

=== Sumathi Awards ===
Year	Nominee / work	Award	Result
2002	Sanda Amawakai	Best Actor	Won
2004	Ramya Suramya	Best Script	Won

=== Hiru Golden Film Award ===
Year	Nominee / work	Award	Result
2016	Ho Gaana Pokuna	Best Comedian	Won

=== Derana Film Awards ===
Year	Nominee / work	Award	Result
2016	Ho Gaana Pokuna	Best Supporting Actor	Won

=== SIGNIS Awards ===
Year	Nominee / work	Award	Result
1988	Mangala Thegga	Best Supporting Actor	Won
2016	Ho Gaana Pokuna	Best Supporting Actor	Won

=== Presidential Film Awards ===
Year	Nominee / work	Award	Result
2006	Bherunda Pakshiya	Best Supporting Actor	Won
2017	Ho Gaana Pokuna	Best Supporting Actor	Won

== Sinhala articles ==
- දොළොස් මහේ පහන දල්වා 49 වසරකට පසු
- දවසක් පුරා ඇසක් වසාගෙන
- සර් වූ මචං
- මනෝ තෝරාගත් පුදුම හත
- දිවිමඟ විසිතුරු
- ජ්‍යේෂ්ඨ සහ ශ්‍රේෂ්ඨ මනෝ
- මනෝ ගැන මනෝ කී කතා
- මනෝරත්නගේ නිමල ළමාවියේ මිහිරිමතකය
- ඔහුගේම රංගනවේදයක් ලංකාවට හඳුන්වා දුන්නා
- දවස තවමත් තරුණයි
