= Somaratne Dissanayake =

Sri Lankan film director, screen writer, and producer (born 1946)

- සෝමරත්න දිසානායක
- Pronunciation: Somarathna Disānāyaka
- Born: 15 November 1946 (age 79); Giriulla
- Other name: Some
- Occupations: Film director; SRC – Chairman; ITN chairman; SLBC chairman
- Years active: 1997–present
- Notable work: Saroja; Punchi Suranganavi; Sooriya Arana; Sarigama; Jangi Hora
- Spouse: Renuka Balasooriya
- Children: Two sons and one daughter

Somaratne Dissanayake (born 15 November 1946) is a Sri Lankan film director, screenwriter and producer. He was the Chairman of Sri Lanka Rupavahini Corporation and the president of the Film Makers Guild of Sri Lanka (FMG). He is the winner of the most number of international awards for cinema in Sri Lanka. In 2007, he received Presidential award for directing Samanala Thatu (2006).

== Biography ==
Somaratne abandoned his life in Australia to pursue a film career in his motherland Sri Lanka. He started the stage play, Mee Pura Wesio in 1984 and then a television drama, Iti Pahan in mid 1990s. He did not come to the cinema industry at once. He studied cinema for another 10 years. He earned his MA in performing arts from the University of Sydney, Australia. He also obtained his PhD in cinema from the University of Colombo.

He made his debut in the Sinhala film in 2000 with a controversial but blockbuster film Saroja (2000 film). He is also well known for other films he directed and screened such as Punchi Suranganavi, Sooriya Arana, Samanala Thatu, Siri Raja Siri, Bindu and Siri Parakum. In 2016, Dissanayake directed and screened the film Sarigama which was a sinhala remake of the world famous film The Sound of Music.In year 2020 he completed "Tsunami" the blockbuster film, and won many international awards for it. He still holds the box-office record of films in the history of Sri Lankan cinema.

He is married to producer and television host Renuka Balasooriya.

In January 2015, he was appointed as the Chairman of the Sri Lanka Rupavahini Corporation (SLRC), only to resign later, for personal reasons.

== Awards and nominations ==
Awards
Year and Film	Award	Category	Result
2000 Saroja	Chicago International Children's Film Festival	Liv Ullmann Peace Award	Won
2000 Saroja	Dhaka International Film Festival	NETPAC Award for Best Asian Film	Won
2000 Saroja	Pyongyang International Film Festival	Special Award of the Festival	Won
2000 Saroja	Iran International Film Festival	Award for the Best Director	Won
2000 Saroja	Kerala International Film Festival	Golden Crow Pheasant Prize	Nominated
2000 Saroja	Singapore International Film Festival	Silver Screen Award for Best Asian Feature Film	Nominated
2000 Saroja	Vesoul Asian Film Festival	Audience Award	Won
2000 Saroja	WorldFest Houston	Bronze Award for First Feature	Won

Awards
Year and Film	Award	Category	Result
2003 Punchi Suranganavi	Dhaka International Film Festival	Jury Mention Award	Won
2003 Punchi Suranganavi	Kerala International Film Festival	Golden Crow Pheasant Prize	Nominated

Awards
Year and Film	Award	Category	Result
2005 Sooriya Arana	Houston International Film Festival	Silver Remi Award for the Best Feature	Won
2005 Sooriya Arana	Presidential Awards	Award for The Most Popular Film of the Year	Won
2005 Sooriya Arana	Presidential Awards	Award for The Best Lyrics	Won
2005 Sooriya Arana	Presidential Awards	Award for The Best Script (Somaratne Dissanayake)	Won

Awards
Year and Film	Award	Category	Result
2005 Samanala Thatu	Mexico International Film Festival	Best Film Award	Won
2005 Samanala Thatu	Carrousel international du film de Rimouski	HumanitasCamerio Award	Won
2005 Samanala Thatu	Carrousel international du film de Rimouski	Jury Mention	Won
2005 Samanala Thatu	Golden Elephant International Children Film Festival	Silver Elephant Award	Won

Awards
Year and Film	Award	Category	Result
2008 Siri Raja Siri	Dhaka International Film Festival	Best Audience Award for Best Film	Won
2008 Siri Raja Siri	Asia Pacific Screen Awards	Best Children's Feature Film	Nominated
2008 Siri Raja Siri	Mexico International Children Film Festival	Jury Mention Award for Best Film	Won
2008 Siri Raja Siri	Argentina International Children Film Festival	Signis Jury Award for the Best Film	Won
2008 Siri Raja Siri	Carrousel international du film de Rimouski	CamerioHumanitas Award	Won
2008 Siri Raja Siri	Carrousel international du film de Rimouski	Cifej Award	Won

== Filmography ==
Year	Film	Role
2000	Saroja	Director, screenwriter, lyricist
2002	Punchi Suranganavi	Director, screenwriter
2004	Sooriya Arana	Director, screenwriter, lyricist
2005	Samanala Thatu	Director, screenwriter, lyricist
2008	Siri Raja Siri	Director, screenwriter
2009	Bindu	Director, screenwriter, lyricist
2013	Siri Parakum	Director, screenwriter, lyricist
2016	Sarigama	Director, lyricist
2020	Tsunami	Director, screenwriter
2021	Jangi Hora	Director, screenwriter
2024	Sinhabahu	Director, screenwriter
2025	Kaputu Koho	Director, screenwriter, lyricist
TBD	18 Wanguwa	Director, screenwriter
