= Samadhi Arunachaya =

Sri Lankan actress

- Born: 25 November 1990 (age 35); Tissamaharama, Sri Lanka
- Other name: Malee
- Occupation: Actress
- Years active: 2010–present
- Spouse: Sanjaya Moragolla (m. 2014)
- Children: 3

Samadhi Arunachaya Moragolla (née Abegunaratna; Sinhala: සමාධි අරුණචායා; 25 November 1990) better known as Malee following the success of the tele drama in the same title, is a Sri Lankan actress who came to the limelight after being crowned as 2010 Avurudu Kumari competition conducted by Sri Lanka Rupavahini Corporation. She began her career with her debut tele Saveena, which was aired on Derana TV, but she is best known for her later tele Malee Directed by Nimal Ratnayaka and produced by Janaka Siriwardana which was also aired on Derana TV.

== Early life ==
Samadhi was born on 25 November 1990 as the youngest of three children family, with two elder brothers, in Tissamaharama, a town in south-eastern Sri Lanka, She schooled at Tangalle Girls College. She married a businessman, Sanjaya Moragolla in 2014 and has given birth to 3 children.
