= Rohana Weerasinghe =

Sri Lankan musician, composer and singer (born 1949)

Rohana Weerasinghe රෝහණ වීරසිංහ
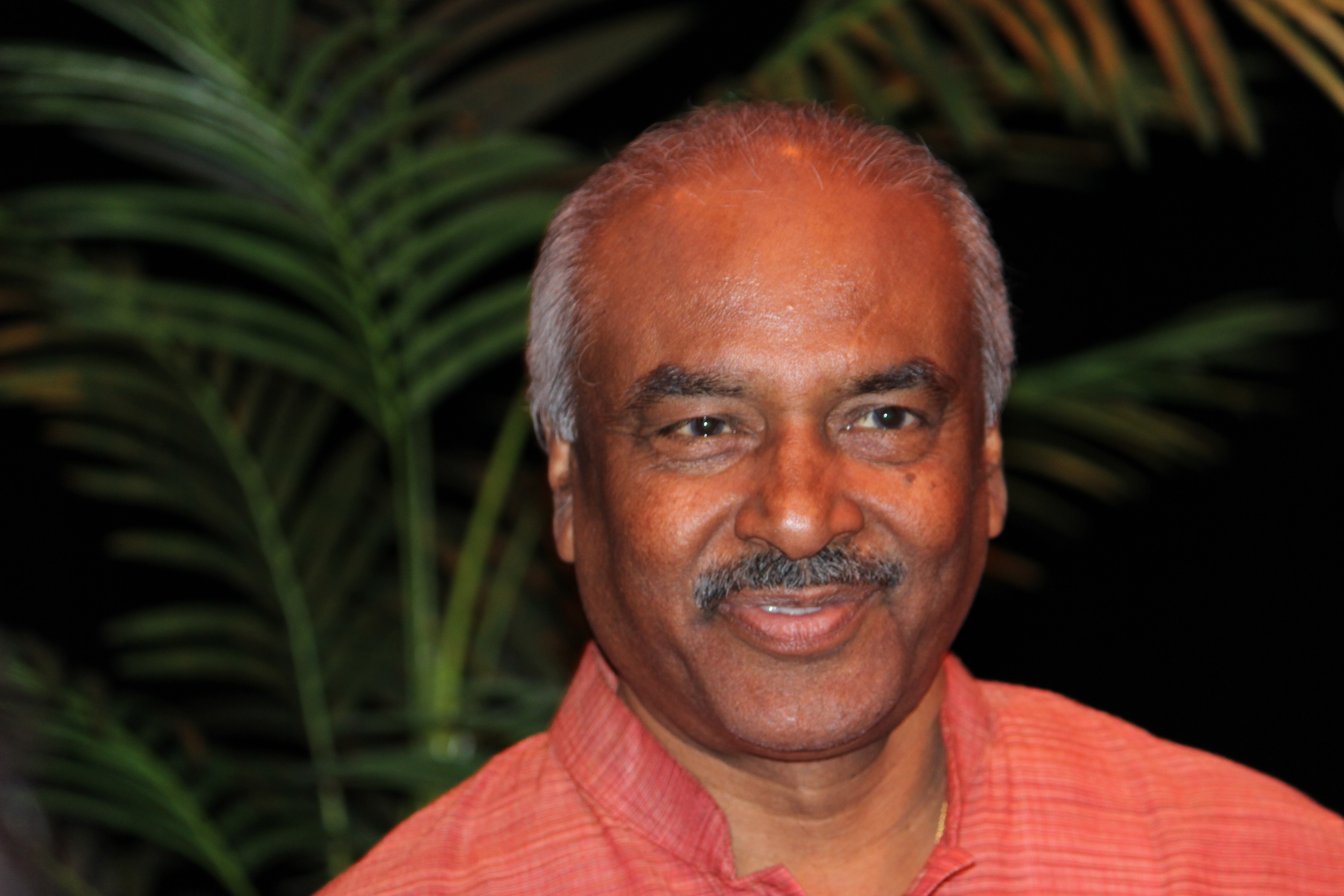
- Weerasinghe at Nanda Malini Geethawali, Winnipeg, Canada
- Born: 18 February 1949 (age 76); Algiriya, Matara, Sri Lanka
- Other names: Dickmadugodage Rohana Chithrakumara Weerasingha
- Education: University of the Visual and Performing Arts
- Occupation(s): Musician, composer, singer, teacher, advisor to the president
- Spouse: Batapola Arachchige Leela Beatrice De Silva
- Children: 2
- Relatives: Priyani Jayasinghe (cousin daughter)
- Website: rohanaweerasingheonline.com

Dr. Rohana Weerasinghe (born 18 February 1949) is a Sri Lankan musician, composer and singer.

== Early life ==
Weerasinghe was born on 18 February 1949 in Algiriya, Matara in southern Sri Lanka. He was the youngest child to his parents Henry Weerasinghe and Sepalin Weerasinghe. In 1954, Weerasinghe started schooling from Good Shepard Family Convent in Nuwara Eliya, and later moved to Vidyachakra Buddhist School Ruwan Eliya, Welimada Maha Vidyalaya, Pannipitya Dharmapala Vidyalaya and Gamini Maha Vidyalaya Nuwara Eliya.

In 1977, Weerasinghe married to Leela Beatrice De Silva, a dancing teacher in profession. They had two sons, Kalindu Gajaba and Chirath Kanishka.

== Music ==
Weerasinghe learnt the basics of music from K.V.S Perera Kithsiri Aluthge. He was able to enter the Government Music School of Sri Lanka for further studies in Oriental Music by mastering Sitar. Later he joined maestro Premasiri Khemadasa as a Sitar player in his Orchestra. Weerasinghe became a key Sitar player for music concerts of prominent Singers in Sri Lanka such as Victor Ratnayake's Sa, Nanda Malini's Shrawana Aradhana and Sanath Nandasiri's Swarna Kundala.

Weerasinghe taught music in D. S. Senanayake College, Senananda Maha Vidyalaya Meepilimanna and Ananda Sastralaya, Kotte as a government music teacher. In 1982, he joined "Sing Lanka" studios as a Sound Engineer. At that time, he composed T. M. Jayaratne's Ekasitha dethanaka, Hiruta Horen and Neela Wickramasinghe's Punchi Sithe Punchi Sina which became popular songs in Sri Lanka.

So far he has created melodies for over 8000 songs, which includes films, teledramas, stage plays.

Weerasinghe has been the Advisor to the President of Sri Lanka in Cultural and Aesthetic Affairs since 2006.

He held the concert "Adaraneeya Rohana" at the BMICH on 14 December 2024.

== Notable performances ==
- Live performances of Ransara Dahara at Arts Centre Melbourne in 2004
- Rohana Ransara performed at Sydney Opera House in 2006
- Live performance at Millennium Dome, London in 2008

== Awards ==
Year	Award	Title	Production
1982	Sarasaviya	Best Music Director	Aaradhana
1987	Sarasaviya	Best Music Director	Aadara Hasuna
1991	Sarasaviya	Best Music Director	Saharave Sihinaya
1991	SIGNIS	Best Music Director	Saharave Sihinaya
1991	Swarnasankha	Best Music Director	Saharave Sihinaya
1994	Presidential Awards	Best Music Director	Saptha Kanya
1994	Sarasaviya	Best Music Director	Madara Parasathu
1994	Presidential Awards	Best Music Director	Madara Parasathu
1998	Sarasaviya	Best Music Director	Seilama
1999	Sarasaviya	Best Music Director	Veesidela
2003	Presidential Awards	Best Music Director	Me Mage Sandai
2007	Presidential Awards	Best Music Director	Anjalika
1982	Vijaya Rupavahini Awards	Best Music Director	Rekha
1983	Vijaya Rupavahini Awards	Best Music Director	Sudu saha kalu
1992	SIGNIS	Best Music Director	Dunhinda addara
1994	Sumathi Awards	Best Music Director	Sankranthi Samaya
1998	Sumathi Awards	Best Music Director	Vilambeetha
2002	SIGNIS	Best Music Director	Gajaman Nona
2008	Raigam Awards	Best Music Director	Rala Bindena Thena
1990	Rasa Awards	Best Music Director	Thala mala pipila
1991	Rasa Awards	Best Music Director	Maghatha
1997	Rasa Awards	Most Popular Song	Sandapanak se awidin
1997	Rasa Awards	Most Popular Song	Ranmalak Lesa
1997	Rasa Awards	Most Popular Music Director in Sri Lanka	N/A
2004	Government Drama Award	Special Recognition	N/A
2009	Eagle Insurance	Eagle Awards of Excellence	N/A

== Publications ==
- Lankika Sangeethayei Rohana Lakuna – Rohana Icon in Sri Lankan Music, Edited by Ravi Siriwardhana and Samudhra Wettasinghe, 2002
- Gaman Magak – Along a Winding Path, Biography of Rohana Weerasinghe, 2009
