= Sri Lanka cinema family =

Generations of Sri Lanka Artistic Family

The Cinema family of Sri Lanka
- Current region: Colombo, Sri Lanka
- Origin: Sri Lanka
- Members: See below
- Traditions: Buddhist Sinhalese

Sri Lanka cinema family is the largest artistic family tree known in the world spanning over a sixty years in the Sinhala film industry. Many members of the family, both direct biological descendants and those married into the family, have had prolific careers as actors, film directors, producers, singers, scriptwriters, journalists and lyricists which included more than six generations at present.

== Beginning of the tree ==
The first generation of this family began about a century ago in 1900s. At that time the drama traditions such as Noorthi, Sokeri and Nadagam were very popular in Sri Lanka, John William Wolboff, who lived in England visited the country. He later settled here and worked as a police officer. During his tenure, John fell in love with a young woman called Hettiarachchige Jane Nona. Jane Nona was a popular actress of the Tower Hall era specially in the popular Nadagam drama called Balasantha. John and Jane were the founders of the family tree. On 24 December 1911, the family had a girl, Gertrude Margaret Wolboff. After Gertrude entered the stage dramas, she changed her name to Vimala Kantha. Vimala Kantha was a popular actress in early Sinhala theater who acted in the plays such as Sivamma Dhanapala. Jane Nona had a cousin named William Perera. William's grandson is Sudath Samarasinghe, a renowned musician.

=== Fonseka Family ===
The Fonseka family began with eleven children; six brothers and five sisters. Malini Fonseka was the third member of the family. Malini was a renowned actress, having starred in over 200 films. Her second - oldest brother; Ranjith Fonseka, worked as an assistant director in films such as Hathdinnath Tharu. He and his wife Nalini had three children. Their eldest daughter, Ruwini Tharanga Fonseka appeared in a number of successful teleseries with high ratings, including the blockbuster teleseries Gehenu Lamai in which she portrayed "Kusum"; directed by Sumitra Peries. She also appeared as the female lead, co-starring with Jagath Wickremasinghe in the hit teledrama, "Devi"; directed by Kumarasiri Abayakoon. She was married to Suneth Perera; a nephew of Sujatha Aththanayake. Their daughter, Yashmi Tharushika Perera, received a Gold Medal for the LAMDA Level 3 Certificate in Performance, marking an early achievement in drama. Her birth marked the union of two celebrated families in the Sri Lankan arts industry — the Fonseka family, led by actress Malini Fonseka, and the Aththanayaka family, led by songstress Sujatha Aththanayaka (née Perera).

Ruwini's younger sister, Tharindi Nayanthi Fonseka is a television journalist who starred her media career from Sirasa TV and worked for Rupavahni, Swarnavahini, Young Asia Television and moved to international media, KRO television Netherlands and many more. She entered acting in Asoka Handagama's Me Paren Enna teledrama, Prasanna Vithanage's film Akasa Kusum and 'Sihina Horu Aran stage Play directed by Rajitha Dissanayake. Tharindi married a film producer and owner of Sky Entertainers (Pvt) Ltd; Rasitha Jinasena and their daughter Manmitha Senadhi Jinasena have acted in theatre productions - Radium Girls, Mamma Mia, Charlotte's Web, and Once Upon A Mattress by Birds of Play in the USA. Achila Ranil Fonseka; younger brother of Ruwini and Tharindi, is an editor, music video director, and founding director of Asian Film Crew; a reputed film production company.

Dayananda Fonseka was the eldest brother of Malini Fonseka. His daughter; Manori Fonseka contributed to several productions such as Kemmura teledrama and the film Pawuru Walalu. Manori's brother Nilanga Fonseka is a graphic designer. Malini's first younger brother is Mahinda Fonseka, whose daughter Hiruni Fonseka also worked as an actress in the films Anthima Reya and Akasa Kusum.

Malini's second younger brother was Ananda Fonseka, who was an actor, director and still photographer. Ananda's daughter, Samanalee Fonseka, is also an actress who acted in the teledrama Sooriy Vinsathi and films Motor Bicycle, Davena Wihagun and Premaya Nam. Samanalee is married to the singer Indrachapa Liyanage, with whom another family is linked to this family tree. Her elder brother; Suranga Fonseka acted in the film Sasara Chethana. Samanalee's next brother Asanka Fonseka has acted in the film Sthree and teledrama Menalada Puthe Kiridunne. Asanka's daughter Kushenya Fonseka is also a child actress who acted in the film Rookada Panchi.

Upali Fonseka was a brother of Malini. His daughter Senali Fonseka is also an actress who played notable characters in the film Siri Parakum and Vijayaba Kollaya as well as television serials Haara Kotiya and Nadagamkarayo.

=== Vimala Kantha family ===
Vimala Kantha was married to Mudunkotuwa Munasinghe Arachchige Dharmadasa Perera, who was a police sergeant. The couple had five children. Eldest daughter Sujatha Aththanayaka is a respected songstress in Sinhala cinema. Her sister Ranjani Perera is a renowned dance teacher and younger brother Susil Perera is a popular comedian and a musician. Sujatha's father, Dharmadasa Perera is the elder brother of popular singer Wasantha Sandanayake.

Sujatha Aththanayaka and Prem Jayanth, who is considered to be the first superstar of Sri Lankan cinema, are also relatives. Sujatha's father Dharmadasa Perera and Ogan Rodrigo's wife are nieces and nephews. Ogan Rodrigo got involved in cinema by directing the music for the first Sinhala dialogue film Mana Prayatnaya. Ogan's brother Aloy Rodrigo is a famous painter. Prem is the son of Aloy Rodrigo. Prem was married to fellow actress Nanda Leelanayake sometime in the 1960s and had seven children, two boys - Jagath and Janith - and five girls - Sunila, Sandhya, Anusha, Nirma and Shiroma.

=== Aththanayake family ===
Sujatha Aththanayake is married to Navaratne Aththanayaka. The couple has three sons - Hely Sajeewa, Chanaka, Samin. Her son Samin Attanayake is married to Dilki Weerasinghe, the daughter of actress Anoja Weerasinghe. Anoja's elder sister Maya Damayanthi is a popular singer. Maya Damayanthi is married to playback singer, Victor Wijayantha Perera. Victor is the only Shehnai player in the country. Victor's brother Henry Perera was also a singer, who sang the popular song, Man Podi Kale Dakkata Passe.

Neelia Perera, sister of Victor and Henry, was married to R. Muttusamy. Muttusamy was a prolific film music director and singer. The couple had four children: Mohanraj, Chitrangi, Prasanna Vadhani and Keerthika. Mohanraj is a music director.

The daughter of Maya and Victor Vijayantha, Kushani Sandareka is a popular singer. Kushani is married to Kasun Kalhara, a prolific singer from another artistic family. Kasun is the son of music director and lyricist H. M. Jayawardena and songstress Malani Bulathsinhala. Malani's sister Sandhya Bulathsinhala is also known as a singer. Sandhya is married to a talented announcer, Lal Ananda Abeydheera.

=== Somakantha family ===
The daughter of Jane Nona's sister, Somakantha enters the stage in the Tower Hall era. Somakantha later married a fellow talented actor of the same era, Thotagamage Wilbert Perera. The Wilbert–Soma couple had eight children: Arthur, Shelton, Suriyarani, Greshan, Davison, Dunston, Rexon and Kumari. Among them is Suriyarani's daughter Kusum Perera is a popular actress. Kusum's husband Leslie Perera is also a well known artist and actor. The couple has two daughters: Nilakshi Perera and Harshika Madhavi, both are popular actresses. Another daughter of Suryarani is Samudra Perera, who was an announcer as well as a theater singer. Samudra's son Kamila Navod worked as child actor for some time.

Dunston is a tabla master. Youngest daughter Kumari Perera was a renowned actress and television presenter who was married to popular journalist Ranjith Yapa de Alwis. Popular singer Chandrani Perera is the daughter of a brother of Wilbert Perera. Rexon Perera's grandson T. Thanushka Gayan Perera is also a musician. As a child actor, he has contributed to productions such as Thanushka Siri Raja Siri and Sathsara Rangana. He is also a tabla player and singer. Thanushka's father Dinesh Suranga Perera is currently a concert stage coordinator, stage playwright, and stage administrator.

Shelton Perera was an accomplished singer, musician and tabla player. Shelton was married to Kumari Shashi, a Hindi girl who came to study dance at Bhatkhande University. The couple has five children - Sathish, Sanjaya, Subash, Anuradha and Anupama. Shelton's son Sathish Perera was a popular singer who started the singing career to continue his father's legacy in 1989. Shelton's daughter Anuradha Perera is also a popular singer. Daughter Anupama Perera is a dancing teacher who studied from Bhatkhande University.

Anupama Perera married popular singer J. A. Milton Perera's son Arosh Perera. Accordingly, Milton's other two sons: Chalaka Champathi, Priyankara Perera and his wife popular actress Dilhani Ekanayake are also related to Shelton's family. Chalaka Chamupathi is also a singer.

=== Sandanayake family ===
Wasantha Sandanayake was married to Don Dharmapala Sandanayake. The couple had four children: Sarath, Daya Hemantha, Sisira and Gamini. Sarath Sandanayake is also a popular singer who sang the songs, Rasa Mihira Katha and Mada Seetha Nalarella. Popular actress Deepika Sandanayake is a distant granddaughter of singer Wasantha Sandanayake. Daya Hemantha was married to Shanthi Abeysekera, who is a well-known director as well as a screenwriter. The couple had two daughters, Supriya and Sadhana, both are popular singers. Sadhana is married to Nanditha Ranatunga, the son of veteran artists Dayarathna Ranatunga and Amara Ranatunga.

Nanditha's aunt Srimathi Ranatunga was married to Gunaratne Abeysekara, a lyricist. He is the brother of the renowned lyricist and journalist Karunaratne Abeysekera. Dayaratne Ranatunga's uncle D. M. Colombage was the first Sinhala announcer of the Sri Lanka Broadcasting Corporation. Karunaratne was married to Erani Abeysekara. Their son, Dilipa Abeysekara is a film critic.

=== Walpola family ===
Popular singer Dharmadasa Walpola is one of the uncles of Somakantha. He was married to fellow songstress Rita Genevieve Fernando popularly known as Latha Walpola. The couple has four children: Suneth, Amith, Dhammika and Chaminda, all are singers. Dhammika Walpola is married to Mahinda Bandara, a musician. Mahinda's brother Raju Bandara is also a popular singer. Mahinda and Raju's mother Chandra Bandara was a singer who sang the song Hada Gee Pothe. Chandra's younger brother Premanath Kodithuwakku is a popular musician. Their father, D. C. Kodithuwakku was also a tabla player.

=== Sirimanne family ===
Popular singer Chamika Sirimanne is also a relative of this large family tree. Chamika's grandfather is a cousin of Wasantha Sandanayake's husband, Dharmadasa Perera. Chamika's father is a talented saxophonist Susil Sirimanne.

=== Ipalawaththage family ===
Shelton Perera's wife Kumari Shashi's father is a popular film director I. P. Sena. Shashi's elder brother is Shyam Kumar Ipalawatte. His son Shaimendra Ipalawatte lives in India, is currently involved in Hindi cinema as a makeup artist. Shaimendra's wife is Flavia Ipalawatte from India is also involved in Hindi cinema as a hair stylist.

Shashi had two younger brothers: Chunky Ipalawatte and Lal Priyadeva. Her brother Chunky Ipalawatte, who appeared in many early Sinhala films. Chunky was married to Shamila Fernando, the daughter of Baptist Fernando, one of the popular actors, film directors and producers in Sinhala cinema. Chunky–Shamila couple had one daughter, Kaveetha Anjali, is also an actress. Baptist's grandson Chris Wijewardena is also an actor who appeared in the television serials Pani Kurullo, Amaliya and the film Apata Sadunu Ape Lokaya.

Kumari Shashi's next brother, Lal Priyadeva is a renowned filmmaker and producer. His elder son Chamath Ipalawatte is an assistant film director. His younger son, Chandev Ipalawatte is an actor.

=== Liyanage Family ===
Samanalee is married to the singer Indrachapa Liyanage. Indrachapa is the son of actor Hemasiri Liyanage. His elder son Saumya Liyanage is an academic and also an actor with many notable roles in the films Sulanga Enu Pinisa, Aba and Vidhu.
