= With You, Without You =

- official poster
- Sinhala: ඔබ නැතුව ඔබ එක්ක
- Directed by: Prasanna Vithanage
- Produced by: Akar Films
- Starring: Shyam Fernando; Anjali Patil; Maheshwari Ratnam; Wasantha Moragoda
- Cinematography: M.D. Mahindapala
- Edited by: A. Sreekar Prasad
- Music by: Lakshman Joseph De Saram
- Release dates: 30 August 2012 (Montreal World); 6 September 2015
- Running time: 90 minutes
- Country: Sri Lanka
- Languages: Sinhala; Tamil

With You, Without You (Sinhala: ඔබ නැතුව ඔබ එක්ක, romanized: Oba Nathuwa Oba Ekka) is a 2012 Sri Lankan film written and directed by prolific Sri Lankan filmmaker Prasanna Vithanage, and produced by Lasantha Navaratne, Mohammad Adamaly and Prasanna Vithanage for Akar Films. It stars Shyam Fernando and Anjali Patil in lead roles with Maheshwari Ratnam and Wasantha Moragoda. Music composed by Lakshman Joseph De Saram.

Based on the 1876 short story "A Gentle Creature" by Fyodor Dostoyevski, Oba Nathuwa Oba Ekka was adapted into a post-war Sri Lankan background. Principal photography was shot in Bogawanthalawa, Central Province, Sri Lanka and Sarasavi Studio in Colombo.

== Synopsis ==
Sarathsiri, a man in his mid-forties, runs a pawn shop from his two-storied building in a remote town surrounded by tea plantations. He broods, rarely talks, and in his spare time intently watches professional wrestling on TV.

One day, Selvi, a young woman, lands at his pawn shop with a fistful of worthless trinkets and keeps coming back. Sarathsiri is intrigued by her and through his maid Lakshmi finds out that Selvi, a Tamil Christian is originally from Kilinochchi, an ethnic civil war stricken area of northern Sri Lanka. Her parents have sent her to this area of central Sri Lanka to save her life. Sarathsiri learns that an older widowed businessman has asked for Selvi's hand in marriage and immediately rushes in to declare his own desire to marry her. She accepts and they get married.

Once at home, Sarathsiri teaches her the basics of pawning business and tells her of his dream to own a tea plantation. However, he remains aloof, cold and unresponsive to Selvi who it seems is blossoming after the marriage. One day they go to see a South Indian Tamil movie at a local theatre. Selvi who has never seen a movie on a big screen is visibly happy. Sarathsiri, however, is his dour self and says it was a waste of money. While Selvi exudes a warmth and happiness, Sarathisri remains engrossed in his pawnshop and the wrestling bouts on TV.

One day out of the blue, an old friend of Sarathsiri appears at his door. Sarathsiri drags his friend out for a drink, they return late at night drunk, and have an argument. In the morning while Sarathsiri is asleep Selvi goes downstairs to answer a knock on the door. Gamini (the friend) is awake and asks Selvi to forgive him for barging in unannounced. Selvi discovers through Gamini that Sarathsiri is an ex Sri Lankan army soldier.

Shocked, Selvi leaves the house. Sarathsiri goes looking for her and finds her at the same bus stop where he had proposed. At night Selvi confronts Sarathsiri and asks him why he hid from her his army past. Dissatisfied with his monosyllabic replies, Selvi says if she knew he had served in the army, she would have never married him. She tells him about her two brothers who were killed by the Sri Lankan army. She informs him that her parents sent her here to save her from being raped by the Sri Lankan army soldiers. Unsettled by her ferocity, Sarathsiri grabs his pillow and blanket and goes downstairs. Selvi follows him asking how many Tamil women he has raped and how much gold he has stolen from them. Sarathsiri retorts saying if it wasn't for him, she would be starving.

While rummaging through the closet, Selvi discovers a handgun in a hidden drawer. At night while Sarathsiri is asleep, she creeps downstairs and points the gun at his forehead.

The next day when she opens the hidden drawer, to her surprise the revolver is missing. She feels that Sarathsiri is watching her. Selvi gradually becomes unresponsive and slips into a depression. With her health failing, Selvi's body is wracked with seizures.

Sarathsiri silently watches her withering away. One day he finds Selvi singing to herself. It dawns on Sarathsiri that he may lose Selvi. He falls on his knees and pleads with her to speak. He promises to change, be more responsive and begs her to give their relationship one more chance. He offers to go and find her missing parents. On hearing that, Selvi goes has a seizure.

Sarathsiri becomes caring and nurturing. He feeds her, looks after her, and talks to her. He confesses that as a soldier he gave false witness to protect his fellow soldiers including Gamini after they were accused of raping and killing a Tamil girl. He tells her that he left the army because he couldn't come to terms with his lie. His confession worsens her condition as she has another seizure.

In a desperate effort to get her back, Sarathsiri sells his business and offers to take her to India and show her films. One morning Selvi unexpectedly apologises to Sarathsiri about not being the wife he desired and promises to make amends. Overjoyed, Sarathsiri kisses her from head to toe and leaves to buy flight tickets for India. Selvi picks up the rosary and prays. Selvi is at peace as she has made her decision.

== Cast ==
- Shyam Fernando as Sarathsiri
- Anjali Patil as Selvi
- Maheshwari Ratnam as Lakshmi
- Wasantha Moragoda as Gamini

== Music ==
The original music for Oba Nathuwa Oba Ekka was composed by Lakshman Joseph De Saram.

== Editing ==
The film's editing was done in Chennai, India by renowned editor A. Sreekar Prasad who edited three of Prasanna Vithanage's movies - Purahanda Kaluwara, Ira Madiyama, Akasa Kusum.

== Sound designing ==
The film's Sound designer was Tapas Nayak whose previous works include Raavan and Paa.

== Cinematography ==
Veteran photographer M.D. Mahindapala joined Prasanna Vithanage for their fifth consecutive project as the cinematographer of Oba Nathuwa Oba Ekka. Their other collaborations are:

- Anantha Rathriya
- Purahanda Kaluwara
- Ira Madiyama
- Akasa Kusum

== Production ==
The script was completed in September 2011 and pre-production started in December 2011. Principal photography was done from February to March 2012. Post-production started in April 2012. The movie was completed in July 2012. Oba Nathuwa Oba Ekka is a co-production between Sri Lanka and Aakar productions India.

== Producers ==
Lasantha Nawarathna and Mohamed Adamaly produced the movie.

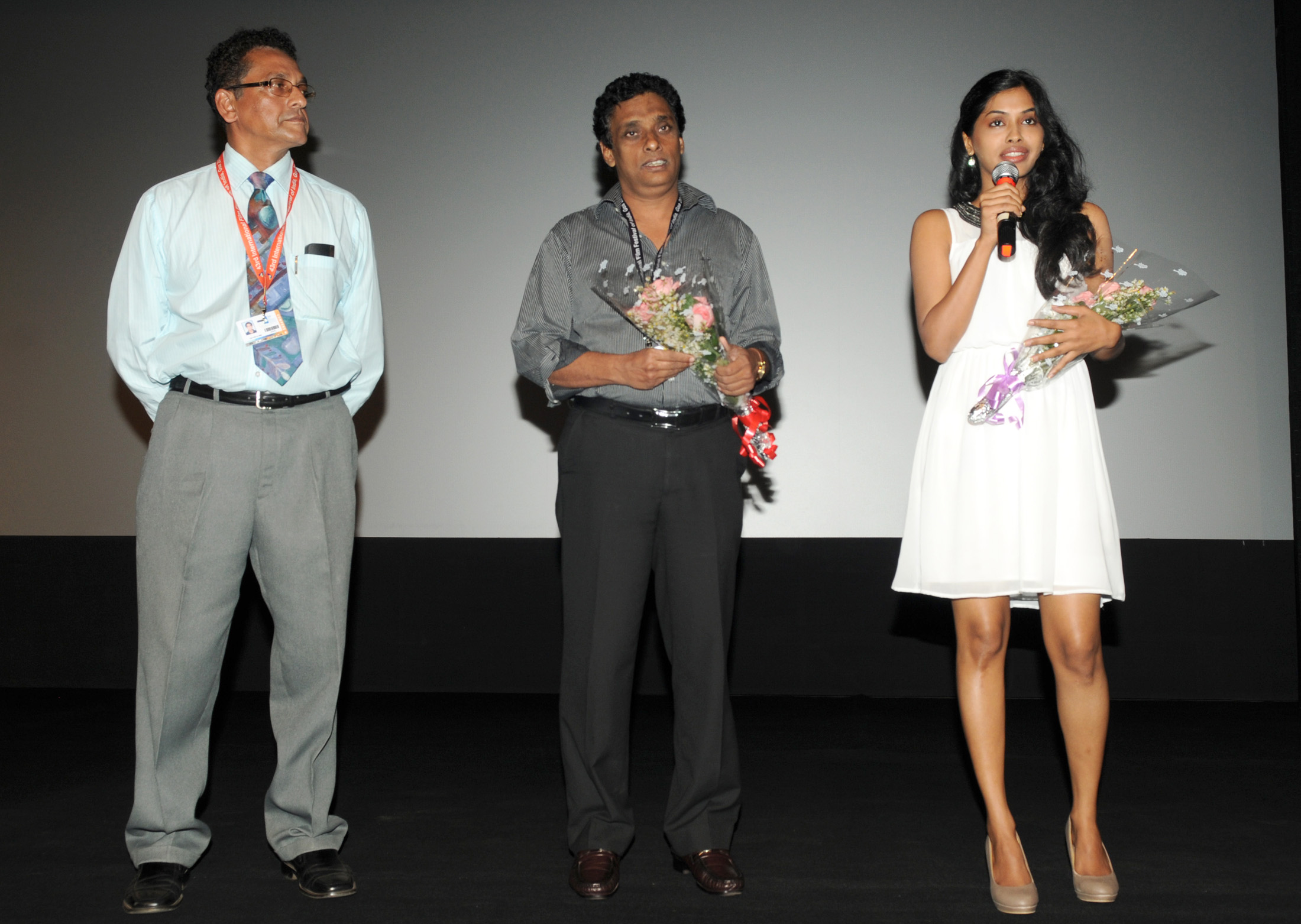
Film crew at IFFI (2012)

== Screened film festivals ==
- Montreal Film Festival – Canada
- Fukuoka Film Festival – Japan
- BFI London Film Festival – London
- Indian Film festival – Goa
- Chennai International Film Festival – Chennai, India
- Vesoul Film Festival – France
- Dublin International Film Festival – Ireland
- Hong Kong International Film Festival - Hong Kong
- Milano African Asian Film Festival
- Moscow International Film Festival
- Kerala International Film Festival
- Pune International Film Festival

== Awards ==
- SIGNIS Award Milano African Asian Film Festival 2013
- BEST FILM Cyclod’or Vesoul Asian Film Festival 2013
- NETPAC AWARD - Vesoul International Film Festival of Asian Cinema 2013
- Won Best Actress Award at

International Film Festival of India :2012
