= Tony Ranasinghe =

Sri Lankan actor

Tony Ranasinghe ටෝනි රණසිංහ
- Tony Ranasinghe in a scene from Delovak Athara
- Born: Ranasinghe Hettiarachchilage Ignatius Anthony Silva; 31 July 1937; Modara, Sri Lanka
- Died: 16 June 2015 (aged 77); Colombo, Sri Lanka
- Education: St. Anthony's College, Wattala; De La Salle College, Colombo
- Occupations: Actor, Writer
- Years active: 1962-2008
- Known for: Crowned king of Sri Lankan cinema
- Spouse: Sirima Indrani Wickramasuriya (m. 1962)
- Parents: Emmanuel Cyril (father); Lilian Fernando (mother)

Deshabandu Tony Ranasinghe (1937-2015), was a renowned Sri Lankan actor who performed in film, theater, and television. Considered one of the greatest Sri Lankan actors of all time, he was renowned for his distinctive facial expressions, voice, and body language, as well as his ability to embody challenging and intense roles, such as Sarath's role in Ahasin Polowata, Nissanka's role in Delovak Athara etc. According to critics, he is the last Crowned king in Sri Lankan cinema to die after Gamini Fonseka and Joe Abeywickrama.

He appeared in 115 films, 43 of which were starring roles. He played 72 supporting roles. He also worked as a screenwriter on two films.

== Personal life ==
Ranasinghe Hettiarachchilage Ignatius Anthony Silva, who later became popular as Tony Ranasinghe, was born July 31, 1937, in Modara to Emmanuel Cyril and Lilian Fernando as the second of the family. He had 8 siblings in the family - The eldest is the Ralex. Other younger members include Stella, Marie, Gina, Romwell, Christopher, and Daya. He studied at St. Anthony's College, Wattala, and De LaSalle College, Modera. His father worked as a Technical Officer in the Department of Posts and Telecommunications. He joined de la Salle College, Modera in 1948 to study English. He was a cricket fan during school times and used to collected photographs of Don Bradman.

He started his career as an English stenographer and quit from the job after few months. He changes his name to an advertisement for the 1962 drama "Bodinkarayo" with the influence from his brother Ralex.

He was married to longtime partner Sirima Indrani Wickramasuriya. The wedding was celebrated on 30 April 1962. Ranasinghe died on 16 June 2015 at a public hospital in Colombo at the age of 77.

== Career ==
Ranasinghe began his career in theater with a role in Dharmasiri Wickramaratne's Ran Thodu in 1963, which won him the Governor General's Award for Best Stage Actor. This award was presented by minister T. B. Ilangaratne. His first film appearance was for Sirisena Wimalaweera's Punchi Amma but was not screened due to an economic crisis.

Ranasinghe made his film debut with Lester James Peries' Gamperaliya (1964) and followed it with Ran Salu with a different villain role in the film. He worked with Peries again on Delovak Athara, in which he had the starring role. He continued to play many main protagonist role in several critically acclaimed blockbuster movies such as Parasathu Mal, Baddegama, Hulawali, Duhulu Malak, Hanthane Kathawa, Pawuru Walalu and Le Kiri Kandulu.

In his early days, Ranasinghe also appeared in many stage dramas with the collaboration with Sugathapala de Silva's drama group "Ape Kattiya". He acted in the plays Bodimkarayo, Thattu Gewal, Waguru Bima, Virupi Muhuna, Harima Badu Hayak, Julius Caesar and Veniciye Velenda.

He also acted in few television serials such as Awarjana, Suwanda Kekulu, Raigam Yaluwo, Ekata Getuma, Hathe Wasama, Manokaya, Soorya Vinsathi and Kadamuna.

In addition to acting, he contributed to the script and drama production. Some of them include Koti Waligaya, Awaragira, Tharanaya, Pawuru Walalu, Kelimadala and Duwata Mawaka Misa. He worked as the producer of stage plays Julius Caesar, Balawa Nawaka Aruma and Dolosweni Rathriya. He was also a talented author. He wrote the books Jogi Hamarai, Hemadama Oba Mage and Mata Kawuruth Adare Na. Then he wrote the novel Adaraneeya Ayra in weekly parts to Sarasaviya magazine.

=== Selected Television Series ===
- Siri Sirimal

== Author work ==
- Adaraneeya Ayra
- Doloswana Rathriya
- Haemadama Oba Mage

== Awards ==
Ranasinghe was awarded the Best Supporting Actor Sarasaviya Award in 1966 for his role in Parasathu Mal. Subsequently he won Best Actor Awards for Hanthane Kathawa (1969), Duhulu Malak (1976) and Ahasin Polawata (1979). In 1980 he played the father of the protagonist in Ganga Addara. 1993's Saptha Kanya won him Best Actor Awards from Sarasaviya, Swarna Sanka, Presidential and OCIC.

Ranasinghe has dabbled in screenplay writing, winning Sarasaviya Awards for Koti Waligaya, Keli Mandala, Awaragira (1995) and Pavuru Walalu. Ranasinghe was honoured with the Deshabandu award, third highest national honour awarded in Sri Lanka in 1988.

== Filmography ==
Year	Film	Role
1963	Gamperaliya	Baladasa
1964	Getavarayo	Mr. Ilangakoon
1965	Sekaya	Jayantha
1966	Parasathu Mal	Sirisena
1966	Sihina Hathak	Doctor Upul Palihakkara
1966	Delovak Athara	Nissanka Wijesinghe
1966	Kinkini Paada	
1966	Senasuma Kothanada	
1967	Wasanthi	
1967	Ran Salu	Cyril Elkaduwa
1967	Manamalayo	
1967	Sadol Kandulu	
1968	Adaravanthayo	Nimal
1968	Singithi Surathal	
1968	Hangi Hora	
1968	Indunila	
1968	Dahasak Sithuvili	Music Master
1969	Pravesam Vanna	Mr. Ranasinghe
1969	Naarilatha	Ranjith Weerasooriya
1969	Hari Maga	Tilak
1969	Hanthane Kathawa	Anura
1970	Penawa Neda	
1971	Kalana Mithuro	
1971	Samanala Kumariyo samaga Api Kawadath Soorayo	
1972	Adare Hithenawa Dakkama	Tony 'Boss'
1973	Hathdinnath Tharu	Raja's cousin
1973	Sunethra	
1973	Gopalu Handa	Saranaa
1973	Hodai Narakai	
1974	Dinum Kanuwa	
1974	Sheela	Victor Karunaratne
1974	Vasthuwa	
1974	Sagarika	
1975	Suraya Surayamai	Lawyer Donald Ranasinghe
1975	Hitha Hoda Minihek	Rohana
1975	Kaliyuga Kale	
1975	Kokilayo	
1976	Ransalu	
1976	Unnath Daahai Malath Daahai	
1976	Adarei Man Adarei	
1976	Duhulu Malak	Mr. "Suray" Suraweera
1976	Walmath Vuvoo	Cyril
1976	Looka Horu	
1976	Asha	
1976	Deyyange Theenduva	Kamal Siri
1976	Mangala	
1976	Onna Maame Kella Panapi	
1976	Hulavali	Bibile Aththo
1976	Saradiyelge Putha	Ravi
1977	Sakunthala	
1977	Hithuwoth Hithuwamai	Club Announcer
1977	Pembara Madu	Dr.Sarath
1978	Hitha Mithura	Cyril
1978	Maduwanthi	Ravindra 'Ravi' Ranasinghe
1978	Veera Puran Appu	
1978	Sithaka Suwanda	Vijay
1978	Sara	Paala
1978	Ahasin Polawata	Dr.Sarath
1979	Eka Hitha	Nalaka
1979	Nuwan Renu	Nuwan Senaratne
1979	Subhani	
1980	Uthumaneni	
1980	Ektam Ge	Upali
1980	Mayurige Kathawa	Paala
1980	Hewanali Ada Minissu	
1980	Ganga Addara	Dr. Juwanis Atapattu
1980	Sasaraka Pethum	Collector Jagath
1980	Bambara Pahasa	Sudesh
1980	Parithyaga	Jayathilaka
1981	Ran Ethana	
1981	Samawenna	Raja Samaranayake
1981	Sayuru Thera	Joseph
1981	Bandura Mal	Sathgama Mudalali
1981	Beddegama	Fernando
1981	Valampuri	Aranolis
1982	Yahalu Yeheli	Mr. Wanigasekara
1982	Pethi Gomara	Dhanushka
1982	Re Manamali	Police Inspector Suraweera
1982	Sagarayak Meda	Dr. Moladanda's nephew
1982	Malata Noena Bambaru	
1983	Sandamali	Prasanna Samarasinghe
1983	Samuganimi Ma Samiyani	
1983	Samanala Sihina	
1983	Kaliyugaya	Doctor
1984	Maya	Ranjith Dias
1984	Sasara Chethana	
1984	Kokila	Nimal / Hermit
1985	Sudu Mama	
1985	Adara Kathawa	Kanthi's father
1986	Dinuma	Wickrama
1986	Koti Valigaya	Minister M.G Ramasuriya
1986	Dushyanthi	Doctor Ranaraja
1987	Janelaya	Mr. Fernando
1987	Sathyagrahanaya	Asoka Atvasada
1992	Kulageya	Ariyaratne
1992	Sisila Gini Gani	Inspector Arthur Silva
1993	Saptha Kanya	Dabare
1995	Avaragira	Ran Banda
1997	Duwata Mawaka Misa	
1997	Tharanaya	Podi Mahaththaya
1997	Savitrige Raththriya	
1998	Eya Obata Barai	Head Doctor
1998	Anthima Reya	
1999	Kolompoor	Alphabet Dantanarayana
1999	Pawuru Walalu	Victor Mendis
2000	Saroja	Police OIC
2000	Anuragaye Ananthaya	Dayapala Jayathilaka
2001	Mahadena Muththai Golayo Roththai	
2001	Anantha Rathriya	Lawyer Vicky
2001	Kinihiriya Mal	Edwin
2002	Salelu Warama	Priyanka's father
2003	Le Kiri Kandulu	Jayananda Ratnapala
2003	Sonduru Dadabima	Solomon Sahabandu
2004	Diya Yata Gindara	Police Chief
2004	Randiya Dahara	
2005	Alu Yata Gini	
2004	Samunoganna Sugandhika	
2006	Ammawarune	Rathnapala Hamuduruvo
2007	Sikuru Hathe	Chief Inspector
2004	Yahaluvo	Sinhala tuition master
2008	Heart FM	Doctor Sri Vastav
2008	Nil Diya Yahana	Jayawardena
2009	Ekamath Eka Rateka	guest appearance

=== Script writing ===
Year	Film	Director
-	Angulimala	First script. Did not filmed.
-	Daruwange Gedara	Gamini Fonseka did not filmed.
-	Athuru Mathiwaranaya	Gamini Fonseka did not filmed.
-	Niroopikawa	Did not filmed.
1986	Koti Valigaya	Gamini Fonseka
1995	Awaragira	Lester James Peries
1997	Tharanaya	Sudath Devapriya
1997	Duwata Mawaka Misa	Sumithra Pieris
1991	Kelimadala	D.B. Nihalsinghe
1999	Pawuru Walalu	Prasanna Vithanage
2018	Vaishnavi	Sumithra Pieris

=== Stage dramas ===
Year	Drama	Producer
1962	Bodimkarayo	Sugathapala de Silva
1964	Thattu Gewal	Sugathapala de Silva
-	Ran Thodu	Sugathapala de Silva
1967	Nil Katarol Mal	Sugathpala de Silva
-	Wagurubima	Premaranjith Tillakaratne
-	Viroopi Roopa	Namel Weeramuni
-	Vaniciye Welenda	Bandula Vithanage
1982	Julius Caesar	Himself
-	Gimhane Reyaka Dutu Sihinayak	Helena Lehthimathi
-	Harima Badu Hayak	Sugathpala de Silva
-	Avi	Sugathpala de Silva
-	Parasthawa	Showed only in Galle
-	Balawa Namaka Aruma	W.M. Wijesiri
