= Damayanthi Fonseka =

Sri Lankan actress

- Born: Wanniarachchige Damayanthi Priyalatha Fonseka; 25 August 1960 (age 65); Kelaniya, Sri Lanka
- Resting place: \
- Occupations: Actress, Producer
- Years active: 1979–present
- Spouse: Prasanna Vithanage (m. 1991)
- Parents: Gilbert Fonseka (father); Seelwathie Fonseka (mother)
- Relatives: Malini Fonseka (sister); Karunarathna Hangawaththa (brother-in-law); Samanalee Fonseka (niece); Senali Fonseka (niece); Ashan Fonseka (nephew); Kushenya Sayumi (grandniece)

Wanniarachchige Damayanthi Priyalatha Fonseka (born 25 August 1960) is a Sri Lankan actress, director, and producer.

== Personal life ==
She was born on 25 August 1960 in Kelaniya in a family with 11 siblings. Her father Gilbert Fonseka worked at a Government Press. Her mother Seelwathie Fonseka from Peliyagoda, Kelaniya and was a housewife.

Though she received a government teaching appointment to Habarana, she refused to move far from home. She is married to popular Sri Lankan filmmaker Prasanna Vithanage.

== Family background ==
Three of her sisters - Malini, Sriyani, Rasadari - and two of her brothers - Dayananda and Ananda - are a part of the cinema industry. Her elder sister Malini Fonseka is considered the Queen of Sinhala cinema, has acted many critically acclaimed films since 1963 and has received many Best Actress awards in the local award festivals.

Like her siblings, Damayanthi's several relatives are in the Sinhala film industry. Actor Karunarathna Hangawaththa is her brother-in-law, Actresses Samanalee Fonseka and Senali Fonseka are her nieces, Actor Ashan is her nephew and Actress Kushenya Sayumi of Rookada Panchi fame is her grandniece. Apart from her popular nieces, Samanalee and Senali, five of her other nieces - Shivanya, Ruwani, Tharindi, Manori and Sanduni - are also in the drama industry.

Damayanthi's older brother Actor Dayananda died in 2012 and her other brother Ananda died aged 70 in 2020.

== Career ==
She started acting as a child artiste at the age of 10 while attending school. She acted in the short film Piyek Saha Minisek by I.M. Hewawasam. Her maiden cinematic appearance came through 1976 film Madol Duwa directed by Lester James Peries under the influence by elder sister Malini. However her first screened film was Edath Suraya Adath Suraya in 1972. Since then she acted in many supportive roles in commercially successful films such as Umayangana, Dolosmahe Pahana, Angulimala, Shakthiya Obai Amme and Prathiroo.

She has also produced two films, Purahanda Kaluwara and Anantha Rathriya which were directed by her husband, Prasanna Vithanage and the film Guru Geetha directed by Upali Gamlath. She also helped support the production side of Vithange's newest film Ae. In 2013, Damayanthi established a drama school.

She has acted in many stage plays and television serials. She won an award for her role as a villain in the television serial Hopalu Arana. She won a Jury award for the acting in stage play Avi and then received a Special Merit award for the film Umayangana in 1993 Sarasaviya Film Festival.

Her maiden theatre production came through Ape Aeththo. In 2003, she produced the play Popiyana Uyana and introduced her nephew Ashan Fonseka onto stage. She further produced two stage plays Gasthuwa Keeyada, a Sinhala adaptation of the play "Farewell" by Alexander Vampilov in 1966, and Parana Pinak in 2015 and in 2017, she directed the tele-serial Rankiri Amma where her sister Malini acted in a main role. She also directed the tele-drama Iragala Nekatha.

=== Selected stage plays ===
- Amal Biso
- Api Kawuda
- Avi
- Awalan Kalla
- Balawa Namaka Aruma
- Bheema Bhomi
- Boniki Gedara
- Debiddo
- Deshapaluwa
- Devlowa Yanakan
- Dukganna Rala
- Dvitva
- Erabadu Mal Pottu Pipila
- Ex Girlfriend
- Kadadasi Oru
- Little Animal's Home
- Loka Dekai Eka Minihai
- Man Nilame
- Nari Bena
- Paarajika
- Rajakiya Wendesiya
- Sivamma Dhanapala
- Ukdandu Hewana
- Viyanga
- Wes

=== Selected television serials ===
- Andiri Hewanella
- Amanda
- Ambu Daruwo
- Divya
- Garunda Damana
- Hopalu Arana
- Kumarihami
- Mudiyanse Mama
- Nenala
- Pabalu Menika
- Prarthana Mal
- Piya Saha Daruwo
- Sudu Nelum Vila
- Pujasanaya
- Ranmasu Uyana
- Sanda Madala Kaluwarai
- Sath Mahala
- Senehasata Adarei
- Sihina Genena Kumariye
- Sinahawata Paata Denna
- Sisila Ima
- Sohoyuro
- Thurya
- Tikiri Nilame
- Tikiri Saha Ungi
- Udumbara Kumariyak
- Uragala
- Wana Sarana
- Yaddehi Gedara

== Filmography ==
Year	Film	Role	Ref.
1972	Edath Suraya Adath Suraya	Onlooker	
1976	Madol Duwa	Lawyer's daughter	
1982	Chathu Madura	Pushpa	
1985	Kirimaduwal		
1986	Asipatha Mamai	Manel	
1987	Yukthiyada Shakthiyada		
1988	Amme Oba Nisa		
1988	Angulimala		
1989	Shakthiya Obai Amme	Dhammi	
1991	Sthree		
1991	Jayagrahanaya		
1991	Paaradise		
1991	Dolosmahe Pahana		
1992	Umayangana	Umayangana	
1993	Mawila Penevi Rupe	Dalsi	
1994	Nohadan Landune		
1994	150 Mulleriyawa		
1997	Pavuru Valalu	Daisy	
1998	Anthima Reya		
2007	Aganthukaya		
2008	Nil Diya Yahana	Shanuka's elder sister	
2012	Prathiroo	Muslim mother	
2013	Siri Parakum	Duraya's wife	
2018	Kalu Hima		
2022	Night Rider		
TBD	Gaadi	Bulathgama Disawe's sister	
TBD	Anora		
