= Nimmi Harasgama =

Sri Lankan actress

- Born: Sri Lanka
- Occupation: Actress
- Years active: 1997–present
- Awards: Vishva Keerthi Award (2004)

Nimmi Harasgama (Sinhala: නිම්මි හරස්ගම) is a Sri Lankan-British actress, writer, and producer. The British National Television Awards nominated her for best "Drama Performance" for her portrayal of Nurse Mari in ITV's The Good Karma Hospital. She made her screen-debut through the English movie Mother Teresa in 1997 by portraying a supporting character. Her first appearance in Sri Lankan cinema. was as the lead in the Sinhalese movie Ira Madiyama (2003) for which she won Best Performance/Best Actress at several international and national award ceremonies - these included the 2004 International Film Festival of Las Palmas and 2006 SIGNIS Salutation Awards Ceremony.

== Personal life ==
Nimmi Harasgama was born in Colombo, Sri Lanka to a Sinhalese father and Tamil mother. She has two siblings from her father's first marriage: the artist Nelun Harasgama and Prithi Harasgama. When she was five her family moved to the UK where she attended the Westwood House School for Girls a Church of England school. Nimmi attended Goldsmiths, University of London where she received a B.A. (HONS) in Drama and Theatre Arts. In 2001 she received a scholarship to an Acting in Film Workshop at the New York Film Academy.

== Career ==
After appearing in a supportive role in the English movie Mother Teresa: In the Name of God's Poor in 1997, Nimmi made her first step into Sri Lankan cinema in 2003 playing the lead role in Prasanna Vithanage’s film Ira Madiyama (August Sun) where she played the role of a woman whose husband was missing in action. Her successful performance brought her positive reviews and several accolades, including the Best Actress award at the 2004 International Film Festival in Spain. Following Ira Madiyama, she appeared in another film about the life of Mother Teresa: Mother Teresa of Calcutta (2003) which was filmed in Sri Lanka and Italy.

In 2012 she appeared in her first Tamil speaking role in Enakkum oru per (I Too Have a Name), a short film written and directed by Suba Sivakumaran, which was nominated for the Golden Bear for Best Short at the Berlin International Film Festival in Germany. In 2011 she partnered with ETV, a Sri Lankan television station, to star in the chat show Put a Chat With Auntie Netta based on a character she created.

In 2020 she played the female lead in Deepa Mehta's film Funny Boy based on Shyam Selvadurai's book of the same name. Her performance garnered rave reviews: "Accomplished British-Sri Lankan actress Nimmi Harasgama (also seen in August Sun and the short I Too Have a Name) stands out as the bold, married Nalini..."

In 2023, she collaborated with Bafta-winning Welsh director Philip John to co-write the cross-cultural romantic comedy film "Chennai Story." The movie, which is directed by Philip John, features Indian superstar Shruti Haasan and rising star Viveik Kalra in leading roles.

== Filmography ==
Year	Film	Role	Language	Notes
1997	Mother Teresa: In the Name of God's Poor	Christina	English	
2003	Ira Madiyama	Chamari	Sinhala and Tamil	Best Actress (International Film Festival of Las Palmas 2004); Gold Best Actress (SIGNIS Salutation Awards Ceremony 2006); Vishva Keerthi Award (2004)
2003	Mother Teresa of Calcutta (film)	Sister Celes	English	Television film
2007	Nisala Gira	Nanditha	Sinhala	Full Length Feature
2008	Flowers of the Sky	Priya Gunaratne	Sinhala	Full Length Feature
2009	Shafted	Sharma	English	Short film
2012	Enakkum oru per	Sister	Tamil	Short film
2009	The Great Rudapest Motel	Madame	English	Short film
2020	Hello Darlin’	Aanya	English	Full Length Feature
2020	Funny Boy	Amma / Nalini	English, Tamil, and Sinhala	Full Length Feature
2024	Chennai Story		English	Also, Co-wrote the story with the director Philip John

== Television ==
Year	TV Series	Episode	Role	Language	Notes
2005	Doctors	Leap in the Dark	Mira Chopra	English	
2008	Doctors	Naughty or Nice	Dr. Shareen Patel	English	
2011	Doctors	Sticky and Sweet	Linda Sahota	English	
2011	Doctors	Anything You Say	Linda Sahota	English	
2017	The Good Karma Hospital	Series 1 (6 Episodes)	Mari Rodriguez	English	ITV (UK), ACORN TV / AMAZON PRIME (USA)
2018	The Good Karma Hospital	Series 2 (6 Episodes)	Mari Rodriguez	English	ITV (UK), ACORN TV / AMAZON PRIME (USA)
2018	Requiem	Series 1 Episode 1	Detective Inspector Alice Benton	English	Netflix
2020	The Good Karma Hospital	Series 3 (6 Episodes)	Mari Rodriguez	English	ITV (UK), ACORN TV / AMAZON PRIME (USA)
2022	The Good Karma Hospital	Series 4 (6 Episodes)	Mari Rodriguez	English	ITV (UK), ACORN TV / AMAZON PRIME (USA)
