= Prathiroo =

- official poster
- Sinhala: ප්‍රතිරූ
- Directed by: Kapila Sooriyaarachchi
- Written by: Kapila Sooriyaarachchi
- Produced by: Sense Creations
- Starring: Malani Fonseka; Joe Abeywickrama; Jagath Benaragama
- Cinematography: Chandana Jayasinghe
- Edited by: Ravindra Guruge
- Music by: Darshana Ruwan Dissanayake
- Distributed by: EAP Films
- Release date: November 23, 2012
- Running time: 113 minutes
- Country: Sri Lanka
- Language: Sinhala

Prathiroo (Sinhala: ප්‍රතිරූ; lit. 'The images') is a 2012 Sri Lankan Sinhala drama film directed by Kapila Sooriyaarachchi and co-produced by Kapila Sooriyaarachchi and Harischandra Yakandawala for Sense Creations. It stars Malani Fonseka and Joe Abeywickrama in lead roles along with Jagath Benaragama and Jagath Chamila. Music composed by Darshana Ruwan Dissanayake. It is the 1170th Sri Lankan film in the Sinhala cinema.

== Cast ==
- Malani Fonseka as Leelawathi
- Joe Abeywickrama as Siyathu
- Jagath Benaragama as Wickrama
- Jagath Chamila as Suresh
- Sriyantha Mendis as Teacher
- Palitha Silva as Monk
- Himali Sayurangi sa Purnima
- Veena Jayakody as Parwathi
- Giriraj Kaushalya as Salesman
- Wijeratne Warakagoda as Bookstore owner
- Damayanthi Fonseka as Muslim sister
- Sujeewa Priyalal
- Dharmapriya Dias as Linta
- Ajith Lokuge as Jayatissa
- Bandula Wijeweera
- Kaushalya Samarasinghe
- Dimuthu Chinthaka
