= Chandra Kaluarachchi =

Sri Lankan actress (1943–2019)

- Born: Chandra Kankanamage Kaluarachchi; April 6, 1943; Narahenpita, Sri Lanka
- Died: November 1, 2019 (aged 76)
- Occupations: Film, Television, Radio and Stage actress
- Spouse: Lakshman Wijesekara
- Children: Ama Wijesekara (Daughter) Vihanga Wijesekara (Son)

Chandra Kankanamage Kaluarachchi (April 6, 1943 – November 1, 2019), popularly known as Chandra Kaluarachchi, was an actress in Sri Lankan cinema, theater and television. Kaluarachchi is best known for performances in Welikathara (1971), Ira Madiyama (2003) and Nisala Gira (2007).

== Personal life ==
Chandra Kaluarachchi was born on 6 April 1943 and grew up in Narahenpita, near Colombo.

She died on 1 November 2019 at the age of 76. She was married to musician and actor Lakshman Wijesekara. They had one daughter: Ama and one son: Vihanga.

== Career ==
In the meantime the program named Lamapitiya was encouraged to pursue acting in radio. After leaving college she played the leading role in several Sri Lankan stage productions such as Wahalak Neti Geyak produced by dramatist Premaranjit Tilakaratne. It got recognition at the State Drama Festival 1964, where she won the Best Actress Award. Chandra Kaluarachchi played a grandmother in the S. Karunaratne play Erabadu Mal Pottu Pipila in 1967. Dayananda Gunawardena's Gajaman Puwatha, first in the genre of "docudrama", which he introduced to the Sinhala stage on 14 October 1975. Since her debut role as a 19-year-old woman in Raththaran putha by Arnold Wickramasuriya in 1962, Chandra was recognized for playing motherly and other figures on stage, film, radio and television serials.

== Radiography ==
Year	play	Writer	Role	Ref.
1968	Monara Thenna	Dharmasri Munasinghe	Sanda	
2015	Rangadena Kapuwo	Malaka Dewapriya	Hamine	
2015	Ekathena Kerakumae	Malaka Dewapriya	Manika	

== Filmography ==
Year	Film	Role	Ref.
1968	Dahasak Sithuvili	Nilanthi's aunt	
1969	Mokada Une	Hamine	
1969	Romio Juliet Kathawak		
1969	Bakmaha Deege	Panampallage Celestina Karunawathie	
1970	Lakseta Kodiya	Rani Vandurumana	
1970	Thunman Handiya	Sophie	
1970	Sidadiyen Hayak		
1971	Welikathara	Bathik dress discusser	
1972	Singappuru Chali		
1973	Mathara Achchi	Sumitra's mother	
1973	Hathdinnath Tharu	Siripala's mother	
1974	Sihasuna		
1974	Jeewana Ganga		
1974	Dinum Kanuwa		
1975	Siril Malli		
1975	Tharanga	Mrs. Silva	
1976	Asha		
1976	Mangala		
1978	Selinage Walawwa	Selina's mother	
1978	Sara		
1979	Wasanthaye Dawasak	Kalu Ethano	
1980	Para Dige		
1980	Dandu Monara	Catherine	
1981	Aradhana		
1981	Vajira	Kamani's mother	
1982	Re Manamali		
1983	Muhudu Lihini		
1984	Shirani		
1984	Hima Kathara		
1986	Athuru Mithuru		
1990	Himagira		
1992	Bajar Eke Chandiya		
1993	Seilama		
1997	Sudu Akka		
1994	Yuwathipathi	Redi Nanda	
1999	Pawuru Walalu	Alice 'Nona'	
2003	Ira Madiyama	Duminda's mother	
2005	Samanala Thatu		
2007	Nisala Gira	Kudu Amma	
2015	Bora Diya Pokuna	Desmond's mother	
