= Nisala Gira =

Nisala Gira නිසලගිර
- official DVD poster
- Directed by: Tanuj Anawaratne
- Written by: Yolanda Weerasinghe
- Produced by: Padma Films
- Starring: Nita Fernando; Ravindra Randeniya; Angela Seneviratne
- Cinematography: Suminda Weerasinghe
- Edited by: Ravindra Guruge
- Music by: Aruna Lian
- Distributed by: CEL Theaters
- Release date: 12 September 2007
- Running time: 97 minutes
- Country: Sri Lanka
- Language: Sinhala

Nisala Gira (Silent Honour) (Sinhala: නිසලගිර) is a 2007 Sri Lankan Sinhala psychological drama film directed by Tanuj Anawaratne and produced by Nita Fernando for Padma Films with the funds of National Film Corporation of Sri Lanka. It stars Nita Fernando herself, Ravindra Randeniya in lead roles along with debut actress Nimmi Harasgama and Saumya Liyanage. Music composed by Aruna Lian. It is the 1094th Sri Lankan film in the Sinhala cinema. The film has received mixed reviews from critics.

== Plot ==
Nisala Gira is a moving portrait of a woman (Radha). Her life was changed by one swift, unexpected' stroke of fate... the tragic murder of her only child by underworld drug barons. She loses all that she holds dear... torn by grief in a hidden web of drugs.

== Cast ==
- Nita Fernando as Radha
- Ravindra Randeniya as Minister Saliya
- Angela Seneviratne as Cynthia
- Nimmi Harasgama as Nanditha
- Saumya Liyanage as Marko
- Iranganie Serasinghe as Radha's mother-in-law
- Chandra Kaluarachchi as Kudu Amma
- Damitha Abeyratne as Poddi
- Kanchana Mendis as Asela
- Rozanne Diasz as Nicola
- Jayani Senanayake as Female jailor
