= Mother Teresa: In the Name of God's Poor =

1997 biographical film

- Written by: Dominique Lapierre; Carol Kaplan
- Directed by: Kevin Connor
- Starring: Geraldine Chaplin; Keene Curtis; Helena Carroll; William Katt
- Music by: Irwin Fisch
- Countries of origin: United Kingdom; Germany; United States
- Original language: English

Production
- Executive producer: Robert Halmi
- Producers: Leslie McRay; Dominique Lapierre
- Cinematography: Mike Frift
- Editor: Barry Peters
- Running time: 95 minutes
- Production companies: Hallmark Entertainment; The Family Channel

Original release
- Network: The Family Channel
- Release: October 5, 1997

Mother Teresa: In the Name of God's Poor is a 1997 made-for-television biographical film directed by Kevin Connor and starring Geraldine Chaplin as Mother Teresa. Mother Teresa herself had approved the script but withdrew her imprimatur shortly before her death. It was broadcast on what was then known as The Family Channel on 5 October 1997.

== Plot ==
In mid-1940s Calcutta, Mother Teresa teaches geography at her convent. One day, she and one of the other sisters go outside the convent to find food for their girls, only to get caught up in a riot. Though they manage to make it back to the convent, Mother Teresa is shocked by the sight of the massive number of people starving in the streets. Haunted by the images of the hungry people, Mother Teresa decides to leave the convent to devote her life to caring for the poorest of the poor.

Soon after her arrival in the slums, Mother Teresa teaches the children to read and write, but she faces opposition from the adults in the slum who mistrust her because of the colour of her skin. As Mother Teresa continues her crusade to help the poor, some of her former students from the convent come to her with the desire to become nuns and help her on her mission.

The films end scene sees Mother Teresa travelling to Oslo, Norway to receive the Nobel Peace Prize.

== Cast ==
- Geraldine Chaplin as Mother Teresa
- Keene Curtis as Father Van Exem
- Helena Carroll as Mother Superior
- David Byrd as Archbishop
- William Katt as Harry Harper
- Ravindra Randeniya as Police chief
- Belle Connor as Lorete Pupil
- Neil Daluwatte as Deputy Commissioner
- Chamitha de Alwis as Charu
- Upali De Silva as Angry Worshipper
- Nimmi Harasgama as Christina
- Sunil Hettiarachchi as Bald Man
- Veena Jayakody as Charu Ma
- W. Jayasiri as Mr. Goma
- Leonie Kotalawela as Hospital Nurse
- Hemasiri Liyanage as Manik
- Saumya Liyanage as Student Leader
- Anna Mathias
- Cornelia Hayes O'Herlihy as Sister Gabriella
- Yolanda Peiris as Mabel Goma
- Hilarian Perera as Dying Brahmin
- Prageeth Sanjeeva as Jyoti
- Roger Seneviratne as Student Leader
- Alan Shearman
- Peter Shepherd as Nobel Official
- Sangeetha Weeraratne as Sunitha
- Nilanthi Wijesinghe as Mrs. Goma
- Yashoda Wimaladharma as Sister Maria
- Ronnie Leitch as Hari

== Reception ==
The film was generally well received by critics. At the time of the broadcast, The Philadelphia Inquirer applauded the film as a triumph for the network, as "probably the most important show it has presented in its 20-year history." Praise was lavished on the "authoritative" Chaplin who "commands the little screen at every turn. Quietly and without histrionics, she convincingly demonstrated Mother Teresa's absolute faith that God guides and God provides, despite opposition from both church and state." The review continued to praise how the film is "skilfully and winningly dramatized..and directed with assurance and passion". William Brailsford of The Washington Times noted that "Miss Chaplin gives a convincing performance as Mother Teresa, imitating her soft voice and her awkward yet charming mannerisms and re-creating that aura of piety that surrounded the "saint of the gutters." This remarkable actress has us in the palm of her hands early on, and she never lets go." Brailsford also praised the realism of the project, "The film's portrayal of the horrors of poverty and disease in India's streets is chillingly realistic. With extreme vividness, some scenes will cause viewers to wince as they become bystanders to the insufferable agonies of the poor and starving."

Caryn James of The New York Times also praised Chaplin "Ms. Chaplin is fine in the role, full of quiet determination and faith". However, James felt that "This faithful telling of her middle years cannot capture her inner life. She seems like one more extremely good woman. Whatever Mother Teresa might have thought of that, it doesn't go far as biography or drama."

The film won the Audience Award at the 1998 Art Film Festival and the writers were nominated for the Humanitas Prize.

== Notes ==
Chaplin drew on her experience as a convent-educated schoolgirl in Switzerland and her once-held desire to become a nun.

== See also ==
- Names of God in Christianity
- Notable film portrayals of Nobel laureates
