= Philip John =

British film director

Philip John (born in Newport, Wales) is a director and screenwriter. He is the managing director of his own production company, Orange River Ltd, named after the River Ebbw, which, in the 1960s, was one of the most polluted waterways in Europe.

== Early life and education ==
John played bass with DIY punk band called Reptile Ranch. Along with Spike Reptile, Simon Smith and Andrew Tucker, he founded Z-Block Records, a non profit-making collective releasing records by fellow Cardiff-based DIY bands, including the Young Marble Giants. John also ran a musicians collective at the seminal Grassroots Cafe on Charles Street in Cardiff. John left the music business "following an ill-fated busking-trip to Paris with nine-piece kazoo band performing Motown numbers."

He graduated of Newport Film School (formerly part of the University of Wales, Newport, now the University of South Wales).

== Film ==
On leaving film school, John made a further three short films under various schemes. Sixteen Ounces was made as part of an in-house BBC Wales scheme. BBC Wales and Sgrin Cymru collaborated on Welsh Rarebits, which produced John's BAFTA-nominated short film Suckerfish. John's final post graduation short Sister Lulu was made under the Channel 4/Sgrin Cymru's Screen Gems. Both Suckerfish and Sister Lulu went on to win international festival prizes, including selection by NEW DIRECTIONS Y2K who sponsored a trip to New York and Los Angeles for the 'best new UK directors'.

In 2023, he worked on Chennai Story, which he also co-wrote along with Nimmi Harasgama. The movie starred Blinded by the Light star Viveik Kalra.

== Television ==
John's television drama work includes Murphy's Law, Channel 4 feature-length comedy Wedding Belles written by Irvine Welsh and Dean Cavanagh and primetime series like Being Human, for which he gained a BAFTA nomination as Best Director, Ashes To Ashes and Downton Abbey.

Philip's recent credits include Crossing Lines, Spotless and four episodes of the Starz/Sony series Outlander.
