= The Good Karma Hospital =

British medical drama television series

- Genre: Medical drama
- Created by: Dan Sefton
- Starring: Amanda Redman; Amrita Acharia; James Floyd; Neil Morrissey; Darshan Jariwala; Phyllis Logan
- Composer: Ben Foster
- Country of origin: United Kingdom
- Original language: English
- No. of series: 4
- No. of episodes: 24

Production
- Executive producers: Frith Tiplady; Iona Vrolyk; Will Gould
- Producer: Stephen Smallwood
- Cinematography: Michael Snyman
- Running time: 60 minutes (inc. adverts)
- Production company: Tiger Aspect Productions

Original release
- Network: ITV
- Release: 5 February 2017 – 27 February 2022

The Good Karma Hospital is a medical drama series produced by Tiger Aspect Productions for ITV about a disillusioned doctor, Ruby Walker, who travels to South India hoping to make a fresh start. It stars Amanda Redman, Amrita Acharia, James Krishna Floyd, Nimmi Harasgama, and Neil Morrissey. The series is shot in Unawatuna in southern Sri Lanka, Thiranagama Golden Beach Restaurant, and some other places in Galle District.

The series was recommissioned for a second and a third season. Filming for the second series started in August 2017 and it was broadcast from 18 March 2018. Series 3 first aired in October 2019 in Australia, with a UK premiere in March 2020. A fourth series started airing in the UK on 23 January 2022. On 8 November 2022 it was announced that the show had been cancelled after its fourth series. In December 2025, the entire series began streaming on Netflix in response to viewer enthusiasm.

== Plot ==
A medical drama about a junior doctor, Ruby Walker, who becomes disillusioned with her life and broken relationship, and decides to leave the UK. Seeing an advertisement for a hospital job in south India, she travels there hoping to make a fresh start and finds herself working at The Good Karma Hospital, an under-resourced and overworked cottage hospital run by a strong-willed English expat, Dr. Lydia Fonseca. The show combines interpersonal stories and medical drama alongside the culture and challenges of rural Indian life.

== Cast and characters ==
- Amanda Redman as Dr Lydia Fonseca
- Amrita Acharia as Dr Ruby Walker
- James Floyd as Dr Gabriel Varma
- Neil Morrissey as Greg McConnell
- Darshan Jariwala as Dr Ram Nair
- Nimmi Harasgama as Mari Rodriguez
- Sagar Radia as AJ Nair (Series 1–3)
- Phillip Jackson as Paul Smart (Series 1–2, 4)
- Phyllis Logan as Maggie Smart (Series 1, cameo Series 2)
- Achint Kaur as Mala Pradeep (Series 1-3)
- Soni Razdan as Jasminder Patel (Series 2)
- Ritvik Sahore as Atul Nadar (Series 1)
- Priyanka Bose as Dr Aisha Ray (Series 3)
- Sayani Gupta as Jyoti Gill (Series 3)
- Scarlett Alice Johnson as Tommy McConnell (Series 3)
- Kenneth Cranham as Ted Dalrymple (Series 3)
- Rebecca Ablack as Dr Nikita 'Niki' Sharma (Series 4)
- Harki Bhambra as Dr Samir Hasan (Series 4)
- Raquel Cassidy as Frankie Martin (Series 4)
- Connor Catchpole as Bobby Martin (Series 4)

== Episodes ==
Series	Episodes	Originally released		Ave. UK viewers (millions)
Series	Episodes	First released	Last released	Ave. UK viewers (millions)
1	6	5 February 2017	12 March 2017	7.39
2	6	18 March 2018	22 April 2018	6.28
3	6	12 October 2019 (AU); 15 March 2020 (UK)	16 November 2019 (AU); 19 April 2020 (UK)	5.87
4	6	23 January 2022	27 February 2022	TBA

=== Series 1 (2017) ===
No. overall	No. in series	Title	Directed by	Written by	Original release date	UK viewers (millions)
1	1	"Episode 1"	Bill Eagles	Dan Sefton	5 February 2017	8.13
Junior doctor Ruby Walker has become disillusioned with her life and decides to leave the UK. She heads to South India hoping to make a fresh start, and finds a new home working in an under-resourced and over-worked cottage hospital run by a strong-willed English expat, Dr Lydia Fonseca.
2	2	"Episode 2"	Bill Eagles	Dan Sefton	12 February 2017	8.02
Ruby gets to grips with her challenging new routine working at the hospital, but tension continues in her professional relationship with Gabriel. The doctors have a mystery on their hands when an unidentified man is discovered washed up on the beach. In addition they face a race against the clock to find anti-venom for a local snake catcher whose luck may have run out, leaving him in urgent need of treatment. Guest Stars Rajendranath Zutshi
3	3	"Episode 3"	Bill Eagles	Nancy Harris	19 February 2017	7.08
Ruby becomes personally involved in the case of an abandoned baby that is brought to the hospital during the Holi festival, and Lydia is reunited with an expat artist, whose unusual lifestyle may be about to catch up with him. The festival helps Maggie further to find joy in her decision to stay in India.
4	4	"Episode 4"	Bill Eagles	Vinay Patel	26 February 2017	7.30
Ram clashes with Lydia as a medical case becomes personal on the day he is due to attend a lavish wedding. Ruby treats a patient from the UK whose story does not add up, and the experience leaves her wondering where she really belongs. Mari is conflicted about helping a famous singer. Guest Stars Sharon Prabhakar
5	5	"Episode 5"	Jon Wright	Dan Sefton	5 March 2017	7.07
Lydia and Ruby visit a convent and make a seemingly miraculous diagnosis, but the treatment of a young nun and the senior doctor's interfering attitude creates tension between them, which finally erupts in a fierce confrontation. Maggie and Paul join a group of pilgrims on a trek through the jungle, hoping to find the answer to their prayers, while a stroke victim's family prays for his recovery as well. Ram engages an attractive marriage broker for his son AJ. Meanwhile Ruby's ex-boyfriend initiates a reconciliation. Guest Stars Madhur Jaffrey
6	6	"Episode 6"	Jon Wright	Dan Sefton	12 March 2017	6.71
Tension between Lydia and Ruby continues to grow with the arrival of Ruby's ex-boyfriend, leading Ruby to make a momentous decision. Maggie's health begins to decline dramatically, and her daughter is adamant that the family must return to the UK. However, the staff supports Maggie in her desire to remain in India for the time she has left.

=== Series 2 (2018) ===
No. overall	No. in series	Title	Directed by	Written by	Original release date	UK viewers (millions)
7	1	"Episode 1"	Alex Winckler	Dan Sefton	18 March 2018	6.90
A blistering heatwave hits the region placing additional stress on the hospital. Gabriel and Ruby have differing opinions regarding a patient with abdominal pain and Ruby performs her first surgery.
8	2	"Episode 2"	Alex Winckler	Ben Edwards	25 March 2018	6.58
Lydia tries to regain the trust of a former patient who has turned to a herbal doctor for medical care. Gabriel reveals something about his past as he and Ruby treat a patient with a mysterious condition. Ruby gets a letter from an unexpected source.
9	3	"Episode 3"	Alex Winckler	Nicola Wilson	1 April 2018	6.05
Gabriel joins Ruby on an outreach programme to a tea plantation, but discovers that she has not been completely honest about her reasons for wanting to go there. Back at the clinic, Lydia tries to help a patient who she believes is a victim of domestic abuse.
10	4	"Episode 4"	Lisa Clarke	Gabbie Asher & Dan Sefton	8 April 2018	6.05
Ruby is still reeling from her discoveries at the tea plantation, and must decide whether she can forgive past mistakes. Paul encounters a girl who feels she has special powers. Meanwhile, Mari goes head to head with Lydia when a surrogate mother gives birth in the hospital.
11	5	"Episode 5"	Lisa Clarke	Ben Edwards	15 April 2018	6.05
The clinic is pushed to its limits when a building collapses in Barco and the doctors face a desperate struggle to save the injured survivors. Ruby's objectivity is put to the test when she discovers a secret concerning one of her patients, and Ram helps a woman whose husband is missing.
12	6	"Episode 6"	Lisa Clarke	Dan Sefton	22 April 2018	6.06
Lydia is confronted with a difficult dilemma when she is contacted by her former mentor. AJ saves a patient and makes a decision about his future. Greg tries to help Paul work through his grief. Ruby and Gabriel treat two fishermen who have been involved in a fight. The staff of the hospital come together to celebrate Ram and Mala's wedding, where Ruby and Gabriel acknowledge their interest in each other.

=== Series 3 (2019) ===
No. overall	No. in series	Title	Directed by	Written by	Original release date	UK viewers (millions)
13	1	"Episode 1"	Philip John	Dan Sefton	12 October 2019 (AU); 15 March 2020 (UK)	6.07
After months away with her family, Ruby returns to the hospital for her pregnant sister to give birth. A life-and-death medical crisis unfolds, and Ruby makes a decision about where she belongs. Greg has a surprise family visitor.
14	2	"Episode 2"	Philip John	Kelly Jones	19 October 2019 (AU); 22 March 2020 (UK)	5.60
A medical train rolls into in town providing free operations, and carrying a surprise for Gabriel—an attractive older surgeon from his past. Lydia tries to convince a patient with cataracts to have a needed surgery. A staff member, Jyoti, is viciously attacked, leaving the staff shocked.
15	3	"Episode 3"	Philip John	Ben Edwards	26 October 2019 (AU); 29 March 2020 (UK)	5.85
Gabriel and Aisha get closer when they work on an operation together, threatening Ruby and Gabriel's blossoming relationship. Ruby and Ram fall out over a patient's care, and Edmund's search for his lost love hits a dead end.
16	4	"Episode 4"	John McKay	Dan Sefton	2 November 2019(AU); 5 April 2020 (UK)	5.95
AJ returns home from medical school to assist at the hospital on his break, while Greg discovers his daughter, Tommy, is hiding a secret. Lydia sends Ruby to investigate a possible case of dengue fever at a nearby mission. Despite the staff's best efforts, Jyoti continues to struggle with the physical and emotional consequences of the attack on her.
17	5	"Episode 5"	John McKay	Glen Laker	9 November 2019 (AU); 12 April 2020 (UK)	5.88
It's Diwali, and revelers cause chaos throughout the town. Lydia tries to help a deaf runaway teenager, while Gabriel and Aisha are thrown together in a festival clinic.
18	6	"Episode 6"	John McKay	Nicola Wilson	16 November 2019 (AU); 19 April 2020 (UK)	5.87
As Lydia and Mari disagree about how to support Jyoti, AJ helps a patient with mysterious abdominal pain. Still reeling from what happened with Gabriel, Ruby struggles to return to her normal duties at the hospital.

=== Series 4 (2022) ===
No. overall	No. in series	Title	Directed by	Written by	Original release date	UK viewers (millions)
19	1	"Episode 1"	Philip John	Dan Sefton	23 January 2022	5.74
Lydia is forced to admit a patient who has the highly contagious Nipah virus when Ruby and new British-Asian doctor Samir Hasan break protocol in the fight to save the girl's life.
20	2	"Episode 2"	Philip John	Nyla Levy & Dan Sefton	30 January 2022	5.12
Ruby faces difficult questions when her actions have devastating consequences, while Greg keeps a troubling secret from Lydia and the hospital welcomes a new doctor.
21	3	"Episode 3"	Nimer Rashed	Jess Williams	6 February 2022	5.02
The happy news that Karishma is awake is offset by her loneliness. Samir realises she needs more than medicine to fix her and arranges a little magic. Meanwhile Lydia discovers there's only one answer to Greg's visa problem.
22	4	"Episode 4"	Nimer Rashed	Dan Sefton	13 February 2022	5.03
A tragic case leads Samir and Mari to grow closer still. Lydia and Niki are reminded of how testing life can be as Good Karma Hospital doctors and a familiar face returns to Good Karma but will he find the forgiveness he's looking for???
23	5	"Episode 5"	Philip John	Sumerah Srivastav	20 February 2022	4.98
Ruby is shocked with the unexpected arrival of someone from her past who insists on helping care for her father. Can she really be expected to trust again? A misstep teaches Niki the dangers of overconfidence and Lydia is forced to confront her past in the form of her first husband, the charismatic Dr Jules Fonseca.
24	6	"Episode 6"	Philip John	Matt Evans	27 February 2022	5.30
Lydia and Greg's wedding plans are upset by three emergency admissions. Greg wonders if disappearing to help her patients is a ploy and in truth, Lydia has cold feet. Will they tie the knot?

== Reception ==
On Rotten Tomatoes season 1 received an 80% rating based on reviews from 5 critics.

Gayle Pennington of the St. Louis Post Dispatch described the first season as “a magical combination of familiar and exotically foreign…. a drama you’ll remember long after you finish watching it.“

Writing for the Indian digital news publication Scroll, Vikram Johri says: ”The series…has its heart in the right place even if it cannot entirely avoid tone-deaf generalisations… Ignore these irritants and the show can be engaging, especially when it is not trying to train the viewer in Indian mores… It is Walker who is the show’s beating heart. Unaware of Indian customs and rituals,..she takes to her new home and assignment with gusto, quickly imbibing that all-important Indian lesson of making do with what’s available. As a paediatrician, she finds herself performing minor surgical procedures. However, it is her deep reserves of empathy – and the gentle eyes of the actress who plays her – that make her the ideal doctor. “

Deborah Ross for Event Magazine says that the series, “…does not have an original bone in its body…. It’s intended as Sunday night ‘unchallenging’ fare but if you can sit through it without feeling so challenged you want to throw a shoe at the TV, you are made of stronger stuff than I. “

== DVD releases ==
Title	Number of discs	Year	Number of episodes	UK Release date	Australia Release Date
Series 1	2	2017	6	20 March 2017	2 August 2017
Series 2	2	2018	6	23 April 2018	6 June 2018
Series 3	2	2019	6	20 April 2020	27 November 2019
Series 1-3	6	2017-2019	18	20 April 2020	27 November 2019
Series 4	2	2022	6	11 April 2022	N/A
Series 1-4	8	2017-2022	24	11 April 2022	N/A
