= Pilot Premnath =

1978 film by A. C. Tirulokchandar

- Theatrical release poster
- Directed by: A. C. Tirulokchandar
- Screenplay by: A. C. Tirulokchandar
- Based on: Mezhugu Bommaigal by R. Venkat
- Produced by: D. M. Chandrasena; M. M. Saleem; T Mukundan Menon
- Starring: Sivaji Ganesan; Malini Fonseka
- Cinematography: T. S. Vinayagam
- Edited by: B. Kanthasamy
- Music by: M. S. Viswanathan
- Production company: Cine India Productions
- Release date: 30 October 1978
- Countries: India; Sri Lanka
- Language: Tamil

Pilot Premnath (/preɪmnɑːθ/) is a 1978 Tamil-language film written and directed by A. C. Tirulokchandar. The film stars Sivaji Ganesan as the eponymous character. It is based on R. Venkat's play Mezhugu Bommaigal (transl. Wax Figurines). The film, the first joint Indo-Sri Lankan co-production in history, was shot entirely in Sri Lanka, while post-production took place in India. It was released on 30 October 1978.

== Plot ==
Pilot Premnath, devastated by the tragic loss of his wife in an accident, redirects his love and affection towards his two sons and a blind daughter. However, a significant shift occurs when he discovers an unsent letter written by his late wife.

== Cast ==
- Sivaji Ganesan as Premnath
- Malini Fonseka as Premnath's wife
- Vijayakumar as Premnath's son
- Jai Ganesh as Premnath's son
- Jayachitra as Vijayakumar's lover
- Sridevi as Kanchan
- Major Sundarrajan as Balu
- Prem Anand as Kanchan's lover
- Thengai Srinivasan as Premnath's co-pilot
- Manorama as Premnath's co-pilot's wife
- Sathyapriya as Premnath's son's lover

== Production ==
Pilot Premnath was directed by A. C. Tirulokchandar, who also wrote the screenplay while Aaroor Dass wrote the dialogues. The film was produced by D. M. Chandrasena, Mukundan Menon and M. M. Saleem. The first joint Indo-Sri Lankan co-production in history, it was shot entirely in Sri Lanka, while post-production took place in Madras, India. The film was an adaptation of the play Mezhugu Bommaigal written by R. Venkat. Sivaji Ganesan portrayed the lead character originally played by A. R. Srinivasan, and Sridevi portrayed that character's blind daughter, reprising the role originally played by Sachu.

== Soundtrack ==
The songs were composed by M. S. Viswanathan, and written by Vaali. The song "Azhagi Oruthi" belongs to Baila, a Sri Lankan genre.

Track listing
No.	Title	Singer(s)	Length
1.	"Ilangaiyin Ilam Kuyil"	T. M. Soundararajan, Vani Jairam
2.	"Azhagi Oruthi"	P. Jayachandran, L. R. Eswari
3.	"Muruganendra Thirunaamam"	T. M. Soundararajan
4.	"Who Is The Black Sheep"	T. M. Soundararajan
5.	"Kopithootta Mudhalalikku"	L. R. Eswari, Ceylon Manohar

== Release and reception ==
Pilot Premnath was released on 30 October 1978, Diwali day. The Hindu wrote, "Excellent photography is the chief asset of Pilot Premnath". The Indian Express wrote, "Captivating photography and M. S. Viswanathan's music. A few of the melodious numbers are bound to become hits". Kousigan of Kalki appreciated the film for its music and cinematography, especially the capturing of Sri Lankan locales on camera. Naagai Dharuman of Anna praised the performances of cast, Aaroor Das's dialogues, Vinayagam's cinematography and Tirulokachander's direction. Kumudam described Tirulokchandar as an expert in making a rich story dramatic, the ending as delicious ending, and concluded it was a once-in-a-lifetime feat. Ananda Vikatan rated the film 48 out of 100. Historian Randor Guy noted that the film was a "reasonable success" in both the countries it was produced.
