= Samanalee Fonseka =

Sri Lankan actress and social activist

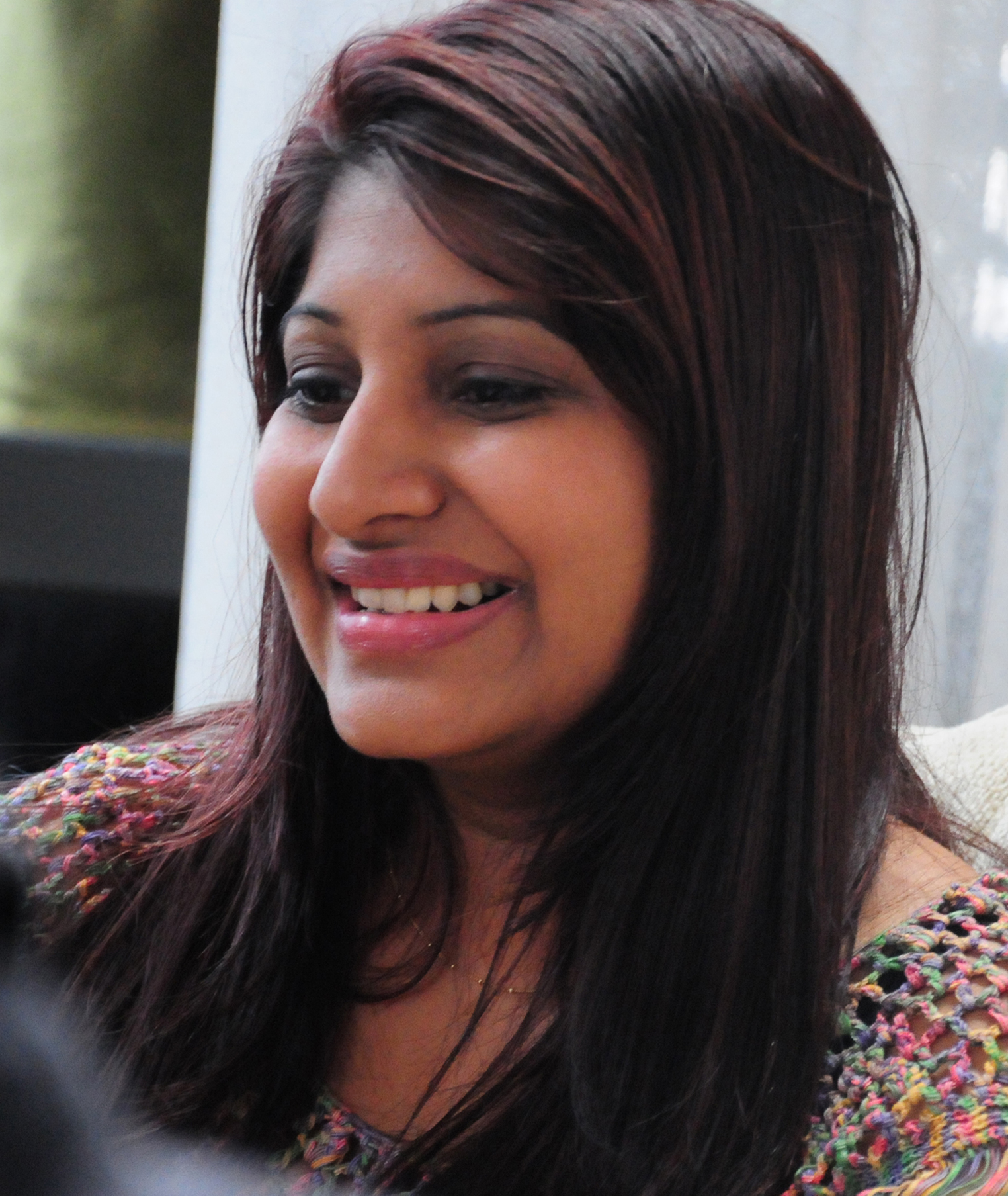
- Born: Wanniarachchige Samanalee Fonseka; 23 November 1981 (age 44)
- Education: St. Pauls Girls School; Sirimavo Bandaranaike Vidyalaya; University of Colombo; University of Peradeniya
- Occupation: Actress
- Years active: 1998–present
- Spouses: Gayan Lakruwan; Indrachapa Liyanage
- Father: Ananda Fonseka
- Relatives: Malini Fonseka (aunt); Damayanthi Fonseka (aunt); Dayananda Fonseka (uncle); Upali Fonseka (uncle); Prasanna Vithanage (uncle); Karunarathna Hangawaththa (uncle); Asanga Fonseka (brother); Senali Fonseka (cousin sister); Ashan Fonseka (cousin brother); Hemasiri Liyanage (father-in-law); Saumya Liyanage (brother-in-law)
- Awards: Sarasaviya Best Actress Award

Wanniarachchige Samanalee Fonseka (Sinhala:සමනලී ෆොන්සේකා), is a Sri Lankan actress and singer. Apart from acting, she is also a social activist who stands against racism, gender inequality and other social issues in Sri Lanka.

== Biography ==
=== Education and personal life ===
Samanalee was born on 23 November in 1981. Finished her primary education at St. Pauls Girls School, Kelaniya and her higher education at Sirimavo Bandaranaike Vidyalaya, Colombo. She holds a B.A degree from the University of Colombo and a Postgraduate diploma in fine arts from the University of Peradeniya. She was previously married to actor Gayan Lakruwan where the wedding was celebrated on 21 July 2010. They divorced after few years and Samanalee is currently married to popular singer Indrachapa Liyanage. Indrachapa is the son of award-winning actor Hemasiri Liyanage and brother of popular actor Saumya Liyanage.

=== Family background ===
Samanalee is the daughter of Ananda Fonseka. Ananda is the brother of popular award-winning actress Malini Fonseka. Three of her sisters, Sriyani, Rasadari, Damayanthi and two brothers – Dayananda and Ananda are in the cinema industry. Malini's sister Damayanthi Fonseka entered cinema with the film Madol Duwa. She is married to filmmaker Prasanna Vithanage. Malini is also the sister-in-law of Karunarathna Hangawaththa. Her nephew Ashan is also an actor. Her grand daughter Kushenya Sayumi entered cinema with the film Rookada Panchi. She is the daughter of Samanalee's brother Asanga Fonseka and Imalka Samaraweera.

Samanalee's aunt Sriyani Fonseka has acted in popular films such as Lokuma Hinawa, Hondai Narakai, Thilaka Saha Thilakaa, Niwena Ginna and Selinage Walawwa. Aunt Rasadari Fonseka has acted in films such as Situ Kumariyo and Athin Athata. Rasadari is married to fellow actor Karunarathna Hangawaththa. Samanalee's elder uncle Dayananda Fonseka died in 2012.

Ananda Fonseka started acting with Thilaka Saha Thilakaa and continued to act in some films such as Eya Dan Loku Lamayek, Wasanthaye Dawasak, Anupama, Bamba Ketu Hati and Sasara Chethana. He also directed the film Umayangana.

Malini's brother Upali Fonseka died on 30 May 2020 by COVID-19 complication while at London. He was the father of popular actress Senali Fonseka. Senali started acting with the blockbuster film Siri Parakum and then made popular characters in Haara Kotiya and Vijayaba Kollaya.

== Career ==
She entered the Sri Lankan film industry as a child artist at the age of five and made her acting debut with Paradisaya by Dinesh Priyasad. Her maiden lead female role was in Aruna Gunarathne's tele-film Suriya Vinshthi when she was 16 years old. In 2004 she won the Best actress (Short Play) award at the State Drama Festival. Samanalee came to fame with her performance in prolific Sri Lankan filmmaker Prasanna Vithanage’s Akasa Kusum. Then she acted in critically acclaimed films such as Motor Bicycle by Shameera Rangana Naotunna, Premaya Nam by Kalpana Ariyavansa, Vindana Ariyawansa, Nimnayaka Hudakalawa by Boodee Keerthisena and Dewena Vihangun by Sanjeewa Pushpakumara.

Samanalee Fonseka has won the best actress award in many national film festivals for her role in the film Premaya Nam in 2018. She also has won the best actress in a supporting role for the film Dewena Vihangun in 2019 at many national award ceremonies. For the role she played in Motor Bicycle, she has won several special jury awards for acting.

In 2021, she appeared in the Raffealla Fernando Celebrity Calendar along with many other Sri Lankan celebrities.

== Beyond acting ==
On 29 December 2014, Fonseka along with fellow actors Laxman Wijesekara, Indrachapa Liyanage and Jagath Manuwarna were attacked in Kumbukgete, while raising voice against Rajapaksa government during the presidential election in 2015. They have organized a program at Kumbukgete under the theme "Let's Get Rid of Deception" by "Aluth Parapure Kalakaruwo".

In November 2018, Fonseka has filed a writ petition through her lawyers seeking Rs. 500 million in compensation from parliamentarian Kanchana Wijesekera. It is based on a statement made by Wijesekera that she had received money from the Ministry of Mass Media and Information.

== Awards ==
- Special Jury Award for Best Actress – Presidential Film Awards 2016 Motor Bicycle
- Special Jury Award for Best Actress – Derana Film Awards 2017 Motor Bicycle
- Award for Best Actress – Sarasaviya Awards 2018 for Premaya Nam
- Award for Best Actress – Signis Sri Lanka Awards 2018 for Premaya Nam
- Award for Best Actress in a Supporting Role – Derana Film Awards 2019 Burning Birds
- Award for Best Actress in a Supporting Role – Presidential Film Awards 2018 Davena Vihagun
- Award for Best Actress in a Supporting Role – Signis Sri Lanka Awards 2019 Davena Vihagun
- Award for Best Actress – Sumathi Awards 2021 for Ado

== Filmography ==
Year	Film	Role	Ref.
1993	Prathingya		
1998	Prathirawaya		
2008	Akasa Kusum	Bunty	
2008	Heart FM	Uththara	
2016	Motor Bicycle	Taniya	
2016	Davena Wihagun	Wasana	
2017	Premaya Nam	Samadhi	
2017	Nimnayaka Hudekalawa	Maya	
2020	Avilenasului	Woman with knife	
2020	Soosthi	Susa	
2025	Bahuchithawadiya	Kumari	
2025	Spying Stars	Wasana	
2025	Aayu	Sandy	
2026	Malaki Duwe Nubha	Nimansa	
