= Ira Madiyama =

Ira Madiyama ඉර මැදියම
- Directed by: Prasanna Vithanage
- Written by: Priyath Liyanage
- Produced by: EAP Films
- Starring: Peter D Almeida; Nimmi Harasgama; Namal Jayasinghe; Mohamed Rahfiulla
- Cinematography: M. D. Mahindapala
- Edited by: Sreekar Prasad
- Music by: Lakshman Joshep de Saram
- Production company: Prasad Laboratories
- Distributed by: CEL Theatres
- Release dates: August 2003 (Montreal); February 2005 (Sri Lanka)
- Running time: 108 minutes
- Country: Sri Lanka
- Languages: Sinhala; Tamil
- Budget: 10 Million LKR

Ira Madiyama (August Sun) (Sinhala: ඉර මැදියම) is a 2005 Sri Lankan bilingual feature film directed by Award-winning Prasanna Vithanage and produced by Soma Edirisinghe for EAP Films. It stars Peter D'Almeida, and Nimmi Harasgama in lead roles along with Namal Jayasinghe and Mohamed Rahfiulla. Music composed by Lakshman Joshep de Saram. It is the 1047th film in Sri Lankan cinema.

The film premiered at the Montreal World Film Festival. A website "www.iramadiyama.com" was launched along with the film, which is for the first time in Sri Lanka.

== Synopsis ==
Ira Madiyama (August Sun) is set in Sri Lanka during the mid-1990s and tells three simultaneous stories against the backdrop of the country's savage civil war (1983 – 2009).

Chamari (Nimmi Harasgama) is searching for her husband, a Sinhalese Sri Lankan Air Force pilot shot down in flight, whom she believes has been taken prisoner by the Tamil Tigers. Desperate to know the truth, she enlists a sympathetic journalist and sets out on a journey to track him down.

Meanwhile, eleven-year-old Tamil Muslim Arfath (Mohamed Rahfiulla) is struggling to keep his companion and friend, a dog, while the family together with the entire village is forced to evacuate by a rebel army.

The third narrative follows Duminda (Namal Jayasinghe), a young soldier who walks into a brothel to find his sister among the working girls.

The main action of the film takes place in Sri Lanka's northern territories, parts of which are controlled by the Tamil rebels who have created a de facto separate state.

These stories are about people who are struggling to hold on to their hopes and dreams while being swept up by the torrents of war. The film is about their quest for life.

== Cast ==
- Peter D'Almeida as Saman Gunawardena
- Nimmi Harasgama as Chamari
- Mohamed Rahfiulla as Aralath
- A. A. Mansoor as Hasan
- Namal Jayasinghe as Duminda
- Nadee Kammalaweera as Kamani
- Maheswari Rathnam as Aralath's mother
- Rajeena Begum as Aralath's Sister
- H. V. Thaheera as Aralath's Grandmother
- Chandra Kaluarachchi as Duminda's mother
- Gayani Gisanthika as Girl at Brothel
- Nilar N. Kasim as TV Presenter
- Sampath Jayaweera as Duminda's friend
- Mahesh Mayra Nisal as Duminda's friend
- Kumara Thirimadura as Checkpoint officer

== Music ==
The original music for Ira Madiyama was composed by Lakshman Joseph De Saram.

== Theatrical Release ==
=== Sri Lanka ===
Ira Madiyama (August Sun) saw its domestic release across Sri Lanka on 10 February 2005. It opened across 16 centres islandwide. It ran for 55 days to good critical and commercial response.

=== Singapore ===
Ira Madiyama (August Sun) had a limited release alongside Akasa Kusum (Flowers of the Sky) starting on 18 June 2010 at Sinema Old School, a 136-seater high definition cinema screening local and award-winning films in Singapore.

== International Film Festivals ==
=== Awards ===
- Grand Prix - Special Mention, Fribourg International Film Festival, Switzerland
- FIPRESCI - NETPAC Award, Singapore International Film Festival, Singapore
- Best Film - Silver Award Lady Harimaguada De Plata, Las Palmas International Film Festival, Canary Islands
- Best Actress - Nimmi Harasgama, Las Palmas International Film Festival, Canary Islands
- Grand Jury Prize, Makati Cinemanila International Film Festival, Philippines

=== Official Selections ===
- Montreal World Film Festival, Canada (World Premiere)
- Quebec International Film Festival, Canada
- International Film Festival of India, India
- Chennai International Film Festival, India
- Kolkata Film Festival, India
- Pusan International Film Festival, Korea
- London Film Festival, United Kingdom
- Bite the Mango, Bradford, United Kingdom
- Amiens International Film Festival, France
- Deauville Asian Film Festival, France
- Fukuoka International Film Festival, Japan
- Cinequest International Film Festival, United States
- Istanbul International Film Festival, Turkey
- Durbun International Film Festival, South Africa
- Hong Kong Asian Film Festival, Hong Kong SAR
- Taiwan Film Festival, Chinese Taipei
- Film Fest Hamburg, Germany
- Dhaka International Film Festival, Bangladesh
- Films from the South Festival, Oslo, Norway
