= Anantha Rathriya =

- Directed by: Prasanna Vithanage
- Written by: Leo Tolstoy (novel); Prasanna Vithanage (writer)
- Produced by: Damayanthi Fonseka
- Starring: Swarna Mallawarachchi; Ravindra Randeniya; Yashoda Wimaladharma; Tony Ranasinghe
- Cinematography: M. D. Mahindapala
- Edited by: Lal Piyasena
- Music by: Harsha Makalanda
- Distributed by: Fifth circuit
- Release date: September 1996; (Pusan International Film Festival)
- Running time: 75 minutes
- Country: Sri Lanka
- Language: Sinhala

Anantha Rathriya (Dark Night of the Soul) is a 1996 Sri Lankan drama film directed by Prasanna Vithanage. It is loosely based on the 1899 Leo Tolstoy novel Resurrection.

== Plot ==
Suwisal (Ravindra Randeniya) arrives at what seems to be an old family house in the middle of the night. The housekeeper explains that the rebels have asked everyone in the village to keep the lights off, and that for all, times have been bad. Suwisal recalls brief memories of the piano and a young girl shyly peering from behind the drapes at him and his aunts.

Several days earlier, Suwisal's fiancée (Yashoda Wimaladharma) had called to remind him of jury duty. He is to spend the next three days listening to a theft/murder case. The defendant, Piyum (Swarna Mallawarachchi), has been charged with the murder of John Wijesinghe. She is a prostitute and Wijesinghe, a client. He did not have enough money to pay her, so instead of continuing with her work, she slipped sleeping pills into his drink. Piyum left the room and Wijesinghe died.

Decades before, a young Suwisal goes back to the village and ancestral home to work on his thesis called, "The Possible Result of Disillusioned Rural Youth and the Impact of the Free Education Policy". He encounters the servant woman working at his aunts' home. He sleeps with her, and soon thereafter, leaves to go back to the city. Through letters, he learns she is pregnant, and stops all communication with her.

During the second day of the trial, Suwisal goes to his lawyer friend Vicky (Tony Ranasinghe) and explains that he knows Piyum. She is the former servant at his aunts' house. Vicky advises Suwisal to keep quiet and wait for the trial to end. Piyum does not indicate that she knows Suwisal, which causes him to question his actions and character. At the end of the trial, the jury convicts Piyum and sentences her to 10 years in jail.

Suwisal's guilt overwhelms him and he goes to the jail to help Piyum. She informs him that she gave birth to a boy, who lived for a week. She then tried to find Suwisal in the city, and "lost her way." She tells him to stop contacting her, and the last he sees of her is while she walks out of jail.

== Cast ==
- Swarna Mallawarachchi as Piyumi
- Ravindra Randeniya as Suwisal
- Yashoda Wimaladharma as Suwisal's fiancée
- Tony Ranasinghe as Counsel for the prosecution
- Asoka Pieris as Vicky
- Veena Jayakody as Loku Amma
- Thalatha Gunasekara as Narmadha's mother
- Gnananga Gunawardane as John Wijesinghe
- Buddhadasa Vithanachchi as Palliyamullage Liobel Ranasinghe

== Acclaim ==
The film won Sri Lanka Film Critics Forum Awards for the outstanding film, the best director and the script writer in 1996.
