= Malini Fonseka =

Sri Lankan actress and politician (1947–2025)

Hon. Malini Fonseka
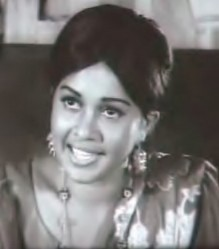
- Fonseka in 1976

Member of Parliament for National List
- In office 22 April 2010 – 26 June 2015

Personal details
- Born: Wanniarachchige Malini Senehelatha Fonseka; 30 April 1947 Peliyagoda, Kelaniya, British Ceylon
- Died: 24 May 2025 (aged 78) Colombo, Sri Lanka
- Party: United People's Freedom Alliance
- Spouses: Upali Senanayake (m. 1965; div. 1970); Lucky Dias (m. 1986; div. 2011)
- Parents: Gilbert Fonseka (father); Seelwathie Fonseka (mother)
- Relatives: Damayanthi Fonseka (sister); Prasanna Vithanage (brother-in-law); Samanalee Fonseka (niece); Senali Fonseka (niece)
- Occupation: Actress
- Awards: Sarasaviya Best Actress Award; Sarasaviya Most Popular Actress Award

Wanniarachchige Malini Senehelatha Fonseka, (Sinhala: මාලිනී ෆොන්සේකා; Tamil: மாலினி பொன்சேகா; 30 April 1947 – 24 May 2025) was a Sri Lankan actress, theatre artist, director and politician. Often dubbed the "Queen of Sri Lankan Cinema", her career spanned seven decades. Fonseka made her debut in Sri Lankan cinema with Tissa Liyansooriya's Punchi Baba in 1968, and later she was named by CNN as one of Asia's 25 greatest film actors of all time in 2010.

Fonseka first became widely known when she won the Best Actress Award at the 1969 National State Drama Festival, followed by a Sarasaviya Best Actress Awards for Hingana Kolla in 1980, Aradhana in 1982 and Yasa Isuru in 1983. She also broke records by winning the Slim Nielsen Peoples' Award for the Most Popular Actress twelve times in a row.

== Biography ==
=== Early life ===
Malini was born as the third of eleven siblings to Bandu Arachchige Gilbert Fonseka, a Government Press worker and Seelwathie Fonseka at Peliyagoda, Kelaniya. After her birth, her family moved to Jambugasmulle, Nugegoda. In 1952, she started her education at Samudradevi Balika Vidyalaya, Nugegoda until grade 5 and continued at Kelaniya Gurukula Maha Vidyalaya until the end of her secondary education. While studiying at Gurukula, she started to sing poetry under the guidance of teacher Thilakaratne and drama under the teacher S. Malal. At a very young age, she played the role of a fifty-year-old woman in the short drama "Hiru Awara Giyado".

=== Family ===
Three of her sisters – Sriyani, Rasadari, Damayanthi – and two of her brothers – Dayananda and Ananda – are a part in the cinema industry.

Like her siblings, Malini's several relatives are in the Sinhala film industry. Actor Karunarathna Hangawaththa and Director Prasanna Vithanage are her brothers-in-law, Actresses Samanalee Fonseka and Senali Fonseka are her nieces, Actor Ashan is her nephew and Actress Kushenya Sayumi of Rookada Panchi fame is her grandniece. Apart from her popular nieces, Samanalee and Senali, five of her other nieces – Ruwini, Tharidi, Shivanya, Manori and Sanduni – are also in the drama industry.

Her older brother Dayananda died in 2012 and her other brothers Ananda and Upali, father of Senali, died in 2020.

=== Political career ===
In April 2010, she was appointed to the Parliament of Sri Lanka as a National List MP from the United People's Freedom Alliance, due to her support of then-incumbent president Mahinda Rajapaksa.

=== Death ===
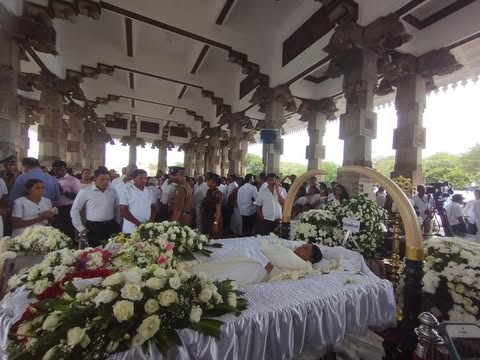
Malini Fonseka lying in state

On 24 May 2025, Fonseka died in Colombo, Sri Lanka, while receiving treatment at a local hospital. She was 78. Her remains were placed for public viewing and to pay respects at her residence and later transferred to the National Film Corporation of Sri Lanka on 25 May. The funeral ceremony, conducted with full state honours, took place on 26 May 2025 at Independence Square in Colombo.

== Career ==
Fonseka started her acting career with stage dramas with Noratha Ratha produced by H. V. Weerasiri in 1963. In 1968, Fonseka won a national award for Best Stage Drama Actress for her performance in Akal Wessa produced by Dharmadasa Jayaweera. From 1963 to 1969, Fonseka played the lead role in 14 stage dramas including; B. Ratnayake's Amal Biso, Sam Perera's Iwa Bawa Nathi Lowa, S. Karunaratne's Guththila, Erabudu Mal Pottu Pipila, Hiru Awarata Giyado, Sunanda Mahendra's Sayuren Aa Landa, Prema Kumara Epitawela's Nuwana Podiya, Sathischandra Edirisinghe's Baka Thapas, Sumana Aloka Bandara's Nidhi Kumba, and Gunasena Galappatty's Liyathambara.

While acting in the play Akal Wessa in Lumbini Theatre, her acting credentials were observed by Sugathadasa Marasinghe, Tissa Liyanasuriya, Joe Abeywickrama, Sisira Senaratne, Anton Alwis, who were looking for an actress for a lead role in their upcoming film. She entered the cinema industry through one of her brothers, Ananda Fonseka, who was both a film director and producer, and was introduced as a cinema actress by Tissa Liyansuriya and Joe Abeywickrama.

At the age of 18, she made her film debut with Tissa Liyansuriya's Punchi Baba (Little Baby) in 1968 with the role "Maali", where she won the Swarna Sankha Award for Best Supporting Actress. The she acted in the films Abudasse kale, Dahasak Sithuwili and Adarawanthayo in the same year. The success of these movies led her to be cast as the lead role by several movie directors of the time. Fonseka acted in over 140 movies thereafter, some of which were international movies. She paired up with popular Indian Tamil actor, Sivaji Ganeshan in Pilot Premnath in 1978. Her career was enhanced by her work alongside Gamini Fonseka who had a long journey in the history of the silver screen in Sri Lanka. At his funeral in 2004, Fonseka stated "His performance had appeal across the board and I had the good fortune of being associated with Gamini. The cinema of that era is slowly fading away and the passing away of Gamini is another step towards that direction". Her popularity peaked in the 1970s and 1980s, as she collaborated with renowned directors, including Lester James Peries and Dharmasena Pathiraja. She successfully made her mark in both Imitative popular cinema (with the films: Mē Dǣsa Kumaṭada (1972), Suhada Pæthuma (1973) Sangeethā (1975) and Næwatha Hamuvemu (1982) as well as Cinematic popular cinema (with the films: Dæn Mathakada (1970) Hathara Denāma Sūrayō (1971), Edath Sūrayā Adath Sūrayā (1972), Adarē Hithenava Dækkama (1972) and Thuṣhārā (1973) at the same time. In the meantime, she became a trendsetter by fashion designs (Mini Frocks, Bell Bottoms, Swimming kit, Cabare kits) and hair cuts for the fans island wide.

As a bridge between two immortal eras in Sri Lankan cinema: Vijaya-Malini and Gamini-Malini made huge impact on Sri Lankan cinema with several blockbuster films. The Gamini-Malini era was polished with the romantic action films such as Nidhānaya, Sahanaya, Edath Surayā Adath Surayā, Hondaṭa Hondayi, Hondayi Narakayi, Avā Soyā Adarē, Kawuda Rājā, and Surayā Surayāmayi. Meanwhile, Vijaya-Malini era powered with romantic thriller films such as Thuṣārā, Susee, Sangīthā, Pradīpē Mā Wēvā, Unnath Dāhayi Maḷath Dāhayi, Diyamanthi, Eyā Dæn Loku Lamayek, Pembara Madhu, Bæddēgama and Madhusamaya. With these blockbuster movies, she became the only actress to win the Most Popular Actress award multiple times where Gamini and Vijaya won the Most Popular Actor award five times in a row respectively.

Her milestones in cinema came through several artistic cinematic films such as Nidhanaya (role "Irene") by Lester James Peiris, Siripala Saha Ranmenika (role "Ranmenika") by Amaranath Jayathilake, Eya Den Loku Lamayek (role "Susila"), Bambaru Ewith (role "Helen") by Dharmasena Pathiraja, Soldādu Unnæhē (role "Prēmakkā"), Induṭa Malmiṭak (role "Nisansalā") and Stree (role "Mæggī Hāmi"). Apart from them, her other notable roles came through the films: Wasanthayē Davasak, Pembara Madhu, Deviyani Oba Koheda, Hingana Kollā, Danḍu Monara, Bambara Geethaya, Sandakaḍa Pahaṇa, Madhusamaya, Umayanganā, Sanda manḍala and Anthima Ræya. During her 63 year cinema career, she acted minor roles in the films: Akkara Paha, Ahas Gavva, Punchi Suranganāvi, Uppalawanna; acted elderly roles in youth age in the films Anūpamā, Hingana Kollā; as well as complex roles in the films Soldādu Unnæhē, Sirimædura and Madhusamaya. In the film Sally, Fonseka played the same role with five different guises: a maid, a married woman, a prostitute, a woman addicted to smoking and drinking, and a crazy woman.

Fonseka is also credited to play the first action packed heroine character in Sri Lankan cinema, with the film Raktha. Then she achieved a significant milestone with Sasara Chetana in 1984 as both the director and the producer. The film won the Sarasaviya Award for the Best Action film in that year and was a economically successful film. Her directorial venture saw three other films: Ahimsa in 1987, Sthree in 1991 and Sanda Madala in 1994.

She entered television with the teledrama Nirupa Mala, where she became the first female teledrama director in the history of Sri Lankan teledramas when she both directed and acted. Her notable performances in the teledramas came through Manalada Puthe Kiri Dunne, Pitagamkarayo, Kemmura, Ambu Daruwo, Pin Mada Puthunē, Mahamera Pāmula, Mahagiridamba, Maha Naḍuva and Depæthi Dahara. She later won the Sumathi Best Teledrama Actress Awards for her roles in Pitagamkarayo and Kemmura. She further solidified her mark as a teledrama director with successful creations such as Sanasili Suwanda.

== Awards ==
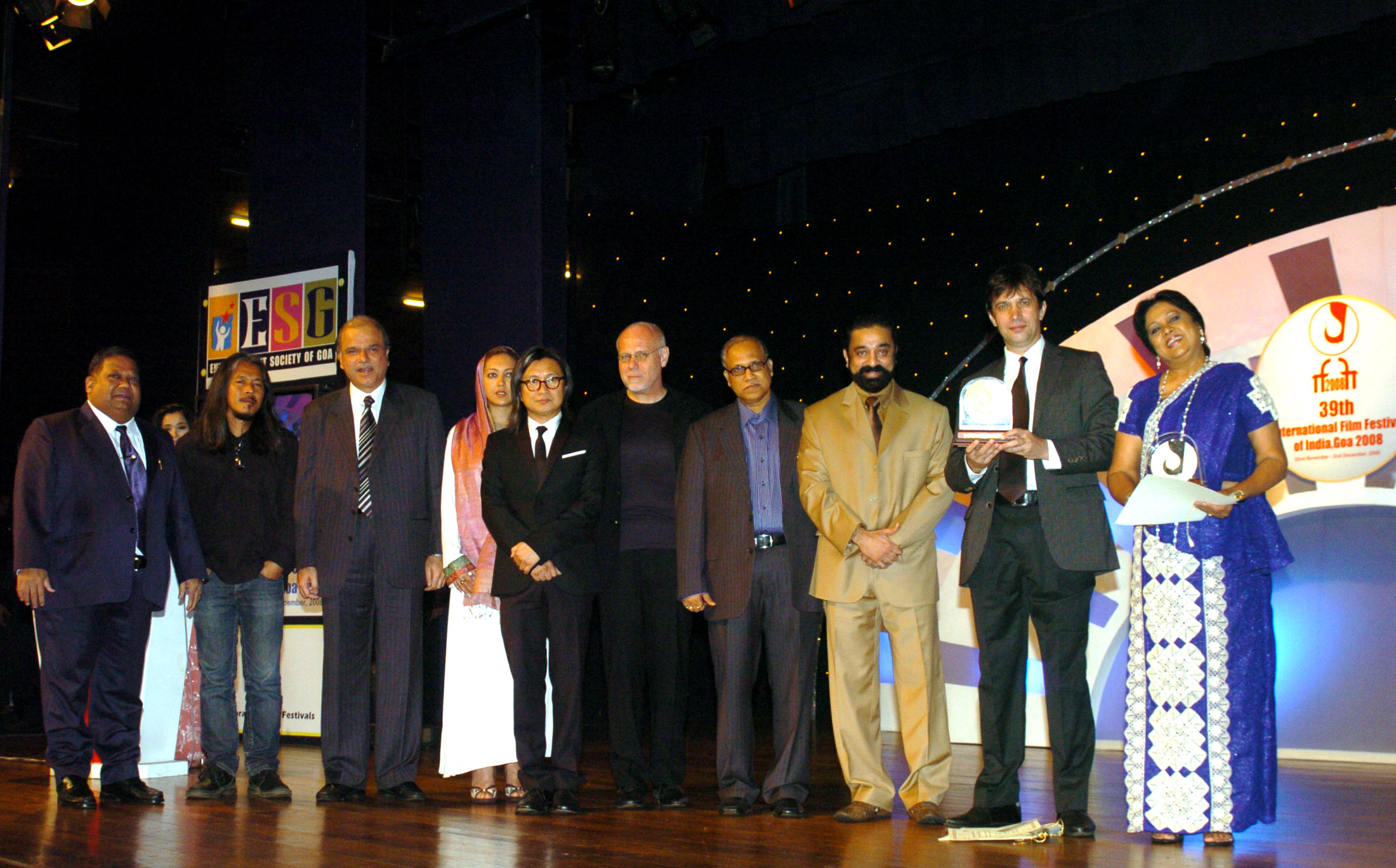
Malani Fonseka won Special Jury Award for the film Akasa Kusum (Flowers of the Sky) at the 2008 International Film Festival of India

Winning more than 40 awards in her career, Fonseka is also the most awarded Sri Lankan film actress ever. She was the first Sri Lankan actress to reach international heights and earn international recognition, winning a special Jury award at the Moscow International Film Festival in 1975; a first of her many international awards. She also won an award at the New Delhi Film Festival in 1977. She also won an honorary doctorate from the University of the Visual and Performing Arts.

In 2010, she was named one of Asia's 25 Greatest Film Actors of All Time by CNN. She is the only Sri Lankan in the list. This list had been prepared ahead of the Oscar night on 7 March.

Apart from the many Sarasaviya Awards, Presidential Awards, OCIC Awards and others for her cinematic miles, she has also received awards including the "Best Actress Award" for the teledrama "Kemmura" at the Sumathi Tele Awards Ceremony, 2000 and Wishva Prasadhini Award as appreciation of her service to the cinema industry from the President of Sri Lanka in 1996.

A felicitation ceremony titled Maliniye was held at the Bandaranaike Memorial International Conference Hall (BMICH) on 30 April 2003 with the participation of President Chandrika Bandaranaike Kumaratunga to honour Fonseka for her four long decades of contribution to the Cinema of Sri Lanka in more than 150 films.

In January 2008, Sri Lankans living in the United States gathered in large numbers at Los Angeles to honour her, alongside a special dinner hosted by the Consular General of Sri Lanka to the Consulate in Los Angeles, Jaliya Wickramasuriya and his wife, followed by an honouring ceremony where she was awarded an Appreciative Plaque by the Consulate General. In 2019, she was honoured with Janabhimani Honorary Award at the BMICH.

=== Deepashika Award Festival ===
Year	Nominee / work	Award	Result
1973	–	Most Popular Actress	Won
1974	Nidhanaya	Most Popular Actress	Won

=== Sarasaviya Awards ===
Year	Nominee / work	Award	Result
1980	People's vote	Most Popular Actress	Won
1980	Hingana Kolla	Best Actress	Won
1981	People's vote	Most Popular Actress	Won
1982	Aradhana	Best Actress	Won
1982	People's vote	Most Popular Actress	Won
1983	People's vote	Most Popular Actress	Won
1983	Yasa Isuru	Best Actress	Won
1984	People's vote	Most Popular Actress	Won
1985	People's vote	Most Popular Actress	Won
1986	People's vote	Most Popular Actress	Won

=== Vanitha Viththi Award Festival ===
Year	Nominee / work	Award	Result
1992	People's vote	Most Popular Lady	Won
1993	People's vote	Most Popular Lady	Won

=== Presidential Film Awards ===
Year	Nominee / work	Award	Result
1980	Bambaru Awith	Best Actress	Won
1981	Wasanthaye Dawasak	Best Actress	Won
1983	Aradhana	Best Actress	Won
2004	Wekanda Walawwa	Best Actress	Won
2006	Ammawarune	Best Actress	Won

=== SIGNIS OCIC Awards ===
Year	Nominee / work	Award	Result
1978	Films in 1977	Best Creative Actress	Won
1981	Dandu Monara	Best Creative Actress	Won
1981	Films in 1980	Creative Female Acting	Won
1992	Madhu Samaya	Creative Female Acting	Won

=== UNDA Awards ===
Year	Nominee / work	Award	Result
1993	Mahamera Pamula	Best Actress	Won
1997	Pitagamkarayo	Best Actress	Won
2007	Sisila Ima	Best Actress	Won

=== Sumathi Awards ===
Year	Nominee / work	Award	Result
1998	Pitagamkarayo	Best Actress	Won
2002	Kemmura	Best Actress	Won

=== Navaliya Vendol Film Awards ===
Year	Nominee / work	Award	Result
2006	People's vote	Appealing Film Actress	Won
2007	People's vote	Appealing Film Actress	Won
2008	People's vote	Appealing Film Actress	Won

=== Other Local Awards ===
Year	Nominee / work	Award	Result
1968	Akal Wessa	State Drama Festival: Best Actress	Won
1969	Punchi Baba	Broadcasting Awards: Best Supporting Actress	Won
1973	Nidhanaya	Reviewers Film Awards: Best Actress	Won
1992	Madhu Samaya	Swarna Sanka Film Awards: Best Actress	Won
2016	Contribution to Cinema	Prathibha Prabha Award (at Raigam Tele'es)	Won
2018	Contribution to Cinema	Lifetime Achievement Award (at Derana Film Awards)	Won
2018	Contribution to Cinema	Hiru Golden Lifetime Award	Won
–	Contribution to Cinema	Swarna Rajani Award (by Kala Lanka Foundation)	Won
–	Contribution to Drama	Felicitation Award (by Malani Fonseka Felicitation Committee)	Won
–	Contribution to Cinema	Felicitation Award (by National Film Corporation)	Won

=== International Awards ===
Year	Nominee / work	Award	Result
1976	Humanship on Cinema, Art and for Peace, Friendship Among Nations	9th Moscow International Film Festival; Honorary Diploma Certificate	Won
1978	Siripala Saha Ranmenika	6th Indian International Film Festival: Honorary Diploma Certificate	Won
2009	Akasa Kusum	39th International Indian Film Festival; Silver Peacock Award and Certificate for Best Performance	Won
2010	Akasa Kusum	7th Levanthe International Film Festival: Best Actress	Won
2012	Outstanding Achievement in Film	Kandy International film Festival: Excellence	Won

== Filmography ==
- No. denotes the Number of Sri Lankan film in the Sri Lankan cinema.

Key
†	Denotes films that have not yet been released

Year	No.	Film	Role	Notes
1968	182	Punchi Baba	Mala	Film debut
1968	184	Abudasse kale		
1968	196	Adarawanthayo	Sumana	
1968	194	Dahasak Sithuvili	Lalith's sister	
1969	204	Kawda Hari	Subha	
1969	214	Prawesam Wanna	Geetha Basnayake	
1969	215	Parawalalu		
1970	223	Dan Mathakada	Sandya Amunugama	
1970	224	Akkara Paha	Kumari	
1971	241	Hathara Denama Surayo	Nilmini	
1971	249	Maahene Ririyaka	Leela Livera	
1971	242	Abirahasa	Lover	
1971	247	Samanala Kumariyo		
1972	250	Nidhanaya	Irene Abeynayake	
1972	251	Sahanaya	Rupa	
1972	266	Adare Hithenawa Dakkama	Deepa	
1972	254	Edath Sooraya Adath Sooraya	Kanthi	
1972	263	Me Dasa Kumatada	Mala	
1973	269	Matara Achchi	Cyril's city co-worker	
1973	271	Suhada Pathuma	Chamila	
1973	272	Thushara	Thushara	
1973	273	Sadahatama Oba Mage		
1973	275	Hathdinnath Tharu	Pearli	
1973	276	Hondama Welawa		
1973	277	Sinawai Inawai		
1973	279	Hondai Narakai		
1973	280	Daahakin Ekek	Shyama Abeykoon	
1973	281	Hondata Hondai	Chammi	
1974	282	Ahas Gauwa	Post office co-worker	
1974	285	Kasthuri Suwanda	Kanchana	
1974	294	Susee	Susee	
1974	299	Senakeliya	Tharangani	
1975	311	Awa Soya Adare	Nilanthi	
1975	313	Kohoma Kiyannada	Samanthi	
1975		Sooraya Soorayamai	Nilanthi / Mango 'Nanda'	
1975	327	Sadhana		
1975	330	Sangeetha	Sangeetha / Geetha (two births)	
1975		Nayana		
1976	332	Pradeepaya Maa Wewa		
1976	335	Kawuda Raja	Chintha	
1976		Yar Aval		Tamil dubbed Sinhala Film
1976	336	Wasana	Sudarshi Rajadasa	
1976	337	Ganga		
1976	342	Diyamanthi	Chitra Saparamandu	
1976	348	Unnath Dahai Malath Dahai		
1976	351	Onna Mame Kella Panapi		
1976	252	Saradiyelge Putha	Subha	
1976	356	Adarei Man Adarei		
1976	383	Zashis (Rahas Kumanthranaya)		
1977	359	Neela		50th film
1977	360	Sakunthala		
1977	365	Hithuwoth Hithuwamai	Apsara	
1977	367	Pembara Madhu	Madhu	
1977	368	Deviyani Oba Kohida	Elizabeth	
1977	369	Eya Dan Loku Lamayek	Katuwalagedera 'Susila' Susilawathie 'Susee'	
1977	376	Siripala Saha Ranmenika	Ranmanika	
1978		Pilot Premanath	Premnath's wife.	Indian Tamil Film
1978	388	Vishmaya	Nita 'Manike'	
1978	395	Selinage Walawwa	Wimalaa	
1978	397	Kundala Keshi	Badhra Kumari 'Kundala Keshi'	
1978	399	Weera Puran Appu	Bandara Menike	
1978	400	Bambaru Avith	Helen	
1978	401	Salee	Salee	
1978	406	Sandawata Ran Tharu		
1978	407	Apeksha	Niranjala	
1978	409	Anupama	Marthaa	
1979	416	Hingana Kolla	Lamahami / Nanda	
1979	418	Divi Thibena Thuru	Sumana	
1979	420	Muwan Palessa	Namali	
1979	422	Wasanthaye Dawasak	Mala	
1979	421	Malligai Mohini	Tamil film	
1979	421	Raan Kurullo	Sujatha 'Kumara Hami'	
1979	423	Monarathenna	Sandha	
1979	435	Nuwan Renu	Renuka 'Renu'	
1980	443	Silva	Kumari	
1980	444	Ektam Ge	Mala Pushpalatha	
1980	450	Raktha	Raktha	
1980	454	Dandu Monara	Anulawathi	
1980	358	Raja Dawasak	Ran Manika	
1981	474	Beddegama	Punchi Menika	
1981	475	Sathweni Dawasa	Agadanna	
1981	476	Sayuru Thera	Jocelin	
1981	478	Bamba Ketu Hati	Dhammi	
1981	479	Soldadu Unnehe	Prema 'Akka'	
1981	481	Situ Kumariyo		
1981	483	Ek Dawasak Re	Asha 'Aashi' Ranaweera	
1981	493	Geethika	Samanthi	
1981	496	Induta Mal Mitak	Nisansala	
1981	499	Aradhana	Jinadari	
1981		Pani Malargal		Tamil Film
1982	531	Mihidum Sihina	Veena	
1982	508	Bambara Geethaya	Mali	
1982	511	Yasa Isuru	Sarojini Wickramasinghe	
1982	520	Anuradha	Anuradha	
1982	539	Newatha Hamuwemu	Madhuka 'Madhu' Damayanthi	
1982		Piya Saha Daruwo		
1983	552	Samuganimi Ma Semiyani		
1983	557	Thuththiri Mal		
1983	563	Loku Thaththa		
1983	567	Samanala Sihina		100th film
1983	569	Muwan Palessa 3		
1983		Peter of the Elephant		Sri Lankan English Film
1984	577	Welle Thanu Maliga	Isabella 'Isa'	
1984	589	Bambara Patikki		
1984	591	Kokila	Kokila	
1984	590	Hithawathiya	Mahesi Jayasekara	
1984	593	Sasara Chethana	also as producer.	
1984	594	Wadula	Ranmali	
1984	603	Sahodariyakage Kathawa		
1986	636	Mal Warusa	Sarojini	
1986	644	Dewduwa		
1986	647	Puja		
1986	650	Awurudu Da	Nirupama	
1987	662	Kele Kella	Uma 'Kala Kella'	
1987	670	Ahinsa	Saroja Madugalla	
1988	675	Sandakada Pahana	Malathi 'Mali' Wijebandara	
1988	677	Angulimala	Aduruthumiya	
1988	678	Newa Gilunath Ban Choon	Deepa / Chapa	
1989	690	Shakthiya Obai Amme	Nirmala 'Nimmie' Randeniya	
1989	693	Waradata Danduwama		
1989	696	Siri Medura	Nirmala Samarawickrama	
1990	699	Jaya Shakthi		
1990	702	Weera Udara		
1990	713	Honda Honda Sellam	Sub Inspector Geeta Randeniya / Neeta	
1991	718	Paradeese		
1991	724	Hithata Dukak Nathi Miniha	Nirmala	
1991	726	Raja Kello	Police officer	
1991	728	Madusamaya	Sarojani	
1991	737	Sthree	Magihami	
1991	738	Suwadena Suwandak		
1991		Sihina Ahase Wasanthaya	Madhu	
1992	751	Ahimi Dadaman	Rathi	
1992	756	Umayangana	Elizabeth	
1992	759	Ruamathiyay Neethiyay	Kanchana	
1992	763	Sathya	Sathya	
1994	803	Sanda Madala	Ekanayake Mudiyanselage Sandalatha 'Sanda'	
1994	811	150 Mulleriyawa	Doctor Sujatha / Juliet 'Julie' Fonseka	
1997	881	Apaye Thathpara 84000k		
1998	901	Anthima Reya	Luxmi	
2000		Saroja		
2002	984	Punchi Suranganavi	Sinhala teacher	
2003	1020	Vekande Walauwa	Sujatha	
2004	1032	Aadaraneeya Wassanaya		
2004		Udu Sulanga		
2006	1064	Dedunu Wessa		
2006	1081	Ammawarune	Sumanawathi	
2007	1090	Uppalawanna	Nayaka Meheniya	
2008	1111	Aba	Bhadra Kachchayana	
2008	1114	Machan	Manoj's mother	
2008	1128	Akasa Kusum	Sandhya Rani	150th film
2009	1120	Dancing Star	herself. cameo appearance	
2010		Saraa		
2011	1166	Selvam	Madhuvani	
2012	1180	Prathiroo	Leelawathi	
2016	1265	Sarigama	Matron	
2020		Rookada Panchi	School principal	
2021		Bhavatharana		
2025		Aayu	Nishmi's mother	Released Posthumously
2026		Malaki Duwe Nuba	Chanuli's grandmother	Released Posthumously
2026		Monara Vilak	Vandana	Released Posthumously, Final Film

=== Director and actor ===
Year	Film	Note
1984	Sasara Chethana	Also as Producer
1987	Ahinsa	Also as Producer
1991	Sthree	
1994	Sanda Madala	Also as Script writer

Awards
Preceded by Swarna Kahavita for Binaramalee	Sarasaviya Best Actress Award for Hingana Kolle; 1980	Succeeded by Vasanthi Chathurani for Ganga Addara
Preceded by Vasanthi Chathurani for Ganga Addara	Sarasaviya Best Actress Award for Aradhana; 1982	Succeeded by for
Preceded by for	Most Popular Actress Award for 1980	Succeeded by for
Preceded by for	Most Popular Actress Award for 1981	Succeeded by for
