= Pavuru Valalu =

Pawuru Walalu පවුරු වළලු
- Directed by: Prasanna Vithanage
- Written by: Tony Ranasinghe
- Produced by: Padma Films
- Starring: Tony Ranasinghe; Nita Fernando; Sangeetha Weeraratne
- Cinematography: Suminda Weerasinghe
- Edited by: Lal Piyasena
- Music by: Harsha Makalanda
- Release date: 22 January 1999
- Country: Sri Lanka
- Language: Sinhala

Pawuru Walalu (Walls Within) (Sinhala: පවුරු වළලු) is a 1998 Sri Lankan Sinhala drama film directed by Prasanna Vithanage and produced by Nita Fernando for Padma Films. It stars Tony Ranasinghe, Nita Fernando and Sangeetha Weeraratne in lead roles along with Mahendra Perera and Roger Seneviratne. Music composed by Harsha Makalanda. It is the 908th Sri Lankan film in the Sinhala cinema.

The film was telecast on television for the first time through Sirasa TV on 26 January 2003 at 8.00 p.m.

== Plot ==
Violet is a middle-aged woman living in Galle Fort in the 1950s. She is a single mother and raised her two daughters in the city. Her daughters go on to marry, and Violet begins to wonder how to seek happiness as her former partner Victor Mendis returns to the city. She begins to live "according to her heart's desires" and must deal with the societal pressures placed upon her as a result.

== Cast ==
- Nita Fernando as Violet
- Tony Ranasinghe as Victor Mendis
- Sangeetha Weeraratne as Lily
- Mahendra Perera as Anthony
- Damayanthi Fonseka as Daisy
- Seetha Kumari as Maggie
- Roger Seneviratne as Ranjith
- Chandra Kaluarachchi as Alice 'Nona'
- Edward Gunawardena as Edward
- Sanat Dikkumbura
