= Senali Fonseka =

Sri Lankan actress

Senali Fonseka සෙනාලි ෆොන්සේකා
- Born: Wanniarachchige Senali Koshila Fonseka; 18 September 1992 (age 34); Colombo, Sri Lanka
- Education: Visakha Vidyalaya, Colombo
- Alma mater: University of Cambridge (BSc)
- Occupations: Actress; model
- Years active: 2005–present
- Known for: Sri Parakum; Nadagamkarayo
- Parents: Upali Fonseka (father); Senani Fonseka (mother)
- Relatives: Malini Fonseka (aunt); Damayanthi Fonseka (aunt); Samanalee Fonseka (cousin); Indrachapa Liyanage (brother-in-law)
- Awards: Most Popular Teledrama Actress in 2021

Wanniarachchige Senali Koshila Fonseka (Sinhala: වන්නිආරච්චිගේ සෙනාලි කෝෂිලා ෆොන්සේකා; born 18 September 1992) is a Sir Lankan actress in Sri Lankan cinema, theatre, and television. Her first film appearance was in Siri Parakum as Sirimal Ethana. She became more popular with her role as Paatali aka Sudu Chooti in the Sri Lankan television series Nadagamkarayo.

== Personal life ==
Senali Koshila Fonseka was born on 18 September 1992 in Colombo, Sri Lanka. Her father Upali Fonseka was one of the brothers of Sri Lankan famous actress Malini Fonseka, known as Queen of Sinhalese cinema.

She attended Visakha Vidyalaya, Colombo, Sri Lanka. Then her family moved to England, and she got her higher education from University of Cambridge in Biomedical Sciences.

In 2020, Fonseka's father died due to the effect of COVID-19 in England.

== Career ==
In 2013, Fonseka began her acting career in Siri Parakum, directed by Somaratne Dissanayake. It became the highest-grossing film in Sri Lankan cinema history. She made her first television appearance in Sellam Gedara, telecasted on ITN, Sri Lanka. In 2014 she appeared in the TV miniseries Kalu Sewanella.

In 2018, she acted in the Doowili Ahasa television series telecasted on Sri Lanka Rupavahini Corporation. In 2021, she became more popular with the role of Paatali aka Sudu Chooti in the Sri Lankan television series Nadagamkarayo. She became known through the role of Paatali, and later won Most Popular Teledrama Actress at the Sumathi Awards in 2021. Fonseka has been acclaimed critics and audiences for her performance in Nadagamkarayo.

=== Television serials ===
Year	Teledrama	Role	Ref.
2014	Naagin (Kalu Sewanella)		
2017	Haara Kotiya	Dili	
2018	Doowili Ahasa		
2021	Nadagamkarayo	Paatali	
2026	Mal Bigun	Saanvi	

== Filmography ==
Year	Film	Role	Ref.
2013	Siri Parakum	Sirimal Ethana	
2019	Vijayaba Kollaya	Neelamani	
2021	Kabaddi	Malithi	
2026	Eda Raa	Anatt	
2026	Eka Gei Sokari	Dalumalee	
