= Rookada Panchi =

2020 Sri Lankan children's musical drama film

- Sinhala: රූකඩ පැංචි
- Directed by: Kalpana Ariyawansa; Vindana Ariyawansa
- Written by: Kalpana Ariyawansa; Vindana Ariyawansa
- Produced by: East West Entertainment
- Starring: Kushenya Fonseka; Jackson Anthony; Dilhani Ekanayake; Dhananjaya Siriwardena
- Cinematography: Jaan Shenberger
- Edited by: Kalpana Ariyawansa
- Music by: Rohana Weerasinghe
- Distributed by: EAP Theaters
- Release date: 24 September 2020
- Country: Sri Lanka
- Language: Sinhala

Rookada Panchi (Sinhala: රූකඩ පැංචි: Little Miss Puppet) is a 2020 Sri Lankan Sinhala children's musical drama film co–directed and co-produced by two brothers Kalpana Ariyawansa and Vindana Ariyawansa with their father Kularatne Ariyawansa as executive producer for East West Entertainment. It stars child artist Kushenya Fonseka in lead role with Jackson Anthony, Dilhani Ekanayake and Dhananjaya Siriwardena in supportive roles. Music composed by Dr. Rohana Weerasinghe. Kushenya is the daughter of Asanga Fonseka, the son of Malini Fonseka's younger brother Ananda Fonseka.

The official trailer was released on 20 February 2020. The premiere was held on the 23 September 2020 at the Savoy Primiere Cinema. Initially planned to be released on 17 September, it was delayed and was officially released on 24 September 2020. On 8 September 2020, the songs of the film composed by Rohana Weerasinghe was released at 4 pm at the Savoy Premier Hall, Wellawatte.

The film received mostly positive reviews from critics.

== Cast ==
- Kushenya Fonseka as Rangi
- Lakshika Deshan as Sasa
- Jackson Anthony as Uncle Louis
- Dilhani Ekanayake as Rangi's mother
- Dhananjaya Siriwardena as Uncle
- Umali Thilakarathne as Punchi
- Dayadeva Edirisinghe as Walter
- Bandula Wijeweera
- Niroshan Wijesinghe as Rangi's father
- Malani Fonseka as School principal
- Ravindra Randeniya in cameo appearance
- Bandula Nanayakkarawasam in cameo appearance
