= Pura Handa Kaluwara =

2001 film by Prasanna Vithanage

Purahanda Kaluwara පුරහඳ කළුවර
- DVD poster
- Directed by: Prasanna Vithanage'
- Written by: Prasanna Vithanage
- Screenplay by: Prasanna Vithanage
- Produced by: Prasanna Vithanage
- Starring: Joe Abeywickrama; Linton Semage; Priyanka Samaraweera; Mahendra Perera; Nayanna Hettiarachchi
- Cinematography: M.D Mahipala
- Edited by: K. Sekar Prasad
- Production company: Gemini Studios
- Release date: 9 October 2001 (Colombo)
- Running time: 72 minutes
- Country: Sri Lanka
- Language: Sinhala

Purahanda Kaluwara (Death on a Full Moon Day) (Sinhala: පුරහඳ කළුවර) is a 2001 Sri Lankan Sinhala drama film directed and produced by Prasanna Vithanage. It stars Joe Abeywickrama and Priyanka Samaraweera in lead roles along with Linton Semage and Mahendra Perera. Music composed by Nadeeka Guruge. The film has received mainly positive reviews. It is the 967th film in Sri Lankan cinema.

== Plot ==
Wannihami, the main character, is a blind old man who is mourning the death of his soldier son. He is an average man and one day his simple life is upturned by the news of his son’s death that pushes him into a very difficult journey that tests his faith and courage.

Wannihami lives in a drought-stricken, mostly barren land marred by ethnic conflict, where the sons of the rural poor are dying in a bitter civil war. Wannihami's village consists of decaying huts and houses, such as his own. His house is a small quiet place, its doors are low, and the rain squeezes in from the roof to wet its mud floor.

On the Buddhist holiday of the full moon, the body of Bandara, Wannihami's soldier son, is brought home in a sealed coffin draped with the flag of Sri Lanka, with all its nationalistic symbolism. Wannihami knows that rain will come soon, and it rains on the day Bandara is buried. To ward off the pressure that comes from outside to accept the death of his son’s death, Wannihami sits on the empty veranda’s floor or the dingy rear of the house. It is to this house that his elder daughter would come to ask for his finger print signature, to claim compensation for her brother’s demise. Despite pressure from his desperate community and his family, Wannihami refuses to sign the papers which entitles the family to government compensation.

He decides to dig up his son's sealed coffin, even though he knows it will invalidate the compensation claim. When the coffin is opened, tree trunks are found inside instead of the son's remains. The coffin is closed up and buried once more. The film concludes with Wannihami near a lake listening to the sounds of children playing in the lake as it begins to rain. Ultimately, his greater purpose is to believe that the war cannot kill his son.

== Cast ==
- Joe Abeywickrama as Vannihamy
- Priyanka Samaraweera as Sunanda
- Linton Semage as Sunanda's husband
- Mahendra Perera as Village Officer
- Nayana Hettiarachchi as Yamuna
- Kumara Karunananda as Pala
- Uvindu Harshajith Abeysuriya as Vannihamy's Grandson
- K. A. Milton Perera as Schoolmaster

== Production ==
=== Crew ===
- Prasanna Vithanage - Director, producer, writer
- Sota Yamamoto - Executive producer
- M.D. Mahindapala - Camera (color)
- A. Sreekar Prasad - Editor
- K.A. Milton Pereira - Production Designer
- Jayasudha - Sound

=== Financing ===
Vithanage’s Pura Handa Kaluwara was funded by and produced with Japan's national television (NHK). In an interview conducted by Richard Phillips, Prasanna Vithanage commented "Fortunately I had money from outside Sri Lanka—the Japanese Broadcasting Corporation funded the film."

== Box office ==
The film recorded the highest gate collection at the Colombo Regal cinema and earned Rs. 2,420,284.00 within 61 days to break the previous box office record set by Saroja by Somaratne Dissanayake which earned Rs. 2,414,000.00 after running for 126 days. Within last 50 days, the film earned Rs. 7,621,643.34 showing in thirteen theatres around the country.

== Accolades ==
The main actor, Joe Abeywickrama won Best Actor award at 12th Singapore International Film Festival for his role "Wannihami". In 2001, the film won Grand Prix award, Jury award and NETPAC at 19th Amiens International Film Festival as well as International Film Critic's award at Fribourg International Film Festival in the same year.
