= Anthima Reya =

Anthima Reya අන්තිම රැය
- Directed by: Gamini Fonseka
- Written by: Daya Alwis
- Produced by: Lucky Dias
- Starring: Gamini Fonseka; Lucky Dias; Malani Fonseka
- Cinematography: Suminda Weerasinghe
- Edited by: Elmo Halliday
- Music by: Somapala Rathnayake
- Release date: 31 July 1998
- Country: Sri Lanka
- Language: Sinhala

Anthima Reya (Night of Destiny) (Sinhala: අන්තිම රැය) is a 1998 Sri Lankan Sinhala drama thriller film directed by Gamini Fonseka and produced by Lucky Dias. It stars director and producer themselves with Malani Fonseka in lead roles along with Cletus Mendis and Daya Alwis. Music composed by Somapala Rathnayake. It is the 901st Sri Lankan film in the Sinhala cinema.

The film was cited as the final appearance of Gamini Fonseka in films. This film also marked Gamini-Malani reunion in film after 21 years since 1977.

== Cast ==
- Gamini Fonseka as Linton Cooray
- Lucky Dias as Devendra Silva
- Malini Fonseka as Luxmi
- Mahendra Perera
- Daya Alwis
- Cletus Mendis
- Vinee Weththasinghe
- Thalatha Gunasekara
- Linton Semage
- Miyuri Samarasinghe
- Damayanthi Fonseka
- Udeni Alwis
- Edward Gunawardana
- Lal Kularatne
- Buddhi Wickrama
- Daya Thennakoon
- Teddy Vidyalankara
- Dinesh Priyasad
- Sujatha Paramanathan
- Ananda Tissa De Alwis
- Shantha Saparamadu
- Wasantha Wittachchi
- Gamini Jayalath
