= Akasa Kusum =

- Sinhala: ආකාස කුසුම්
- Directed by: Prasanna Vithanage
- Written by: Prasanna Vithanage
- Produced by: H.D. Premasiri; Prasanna Vithanage; A. Sreekar Prasad
- Starring: Malini Fonseka; Nimmi Harasgama; Dilhani Ekanayake
- Cinematography: M.D Mahindapala
- Edited by: A. Sreekar Prasad
- Music by: Lakshman Joseph de Saram
- Production companies: Prasad Color Lab, Chennai
- Release dates: October 2008 (Pusan); 21 August 2009 (Sri Lanka)
- Running time: 90 minutes
- Country: Sri Lanka
- Language: Sinhala

Akasa Kusum (Sinhala: ආකාස කුසුම්; lit. 'Flowers of the Sky') is a 2008 Sri Lankan Sinhala drama film directed by Prasanna Vithanage and co-produced by H.D. Premasiri, Prasanna Vithanage, and A. Sreekar Prasad for Sarasavi Cineroo Films. It stars Malini Fonseka and Nimmi Harasgama in lead roles along with Dilhani Ekanayake and Kaushalya Fernando. The film's music was composed by Lakshman Joseph de Saram.

Filming started on 23 December 2007 in Colombo. It had its world premiere at the Pusan International Film Festival in October 2008, and won numerous awards at various other film festivals.

The film was released in Sri Lanka on 21 August 2009, and became a box-office hit in that country. It was also Sri Lanka's initial entry to the 2010 Academy Awards for Best Foreign Language Film, but was replaced by Alimankada. In May 2009, American film distribution company, Wonderphil Productions were granted international distribution rights of the film.

== Plot ==
Sandhya Rani (Malini) is an aging film star who was once the darling of the silver screen. Having lost fame and fortune in a changing world, she now lives quietly in obscurity. She earns a living by renting out a room in her house to the young film and television stars of today to satisfy their illicit sexual desires, and by selling dumplings.

Rani is introduced to Shalika (Dilhani), a popular film actress, when she decides to carry on her affair with a co-star. Shalika's husband discovers the affair, and the scandal and publicity bring Rani and Shalika closer as friends. Rani is invited to a media programme on television, as a backup, and after the interview, her profile rises again.

Priya Gunaratne (Nimmi), in her mid-20s, happens to be unmarried, two months pregnant, and HIV-positive, and is employed at a karaoke night club. It is a tough life, but she develops a friendship with another hostess named Bunty (Samanalee).

Shalika tries getting in touch with Udith (Pubudu), her former costar and current lover, with the hopes that he will continue their relationship. However, he decides to end things over the phone callously. Rani commiserates with Shalika by exploring her affair and the patriarchy inherent in the entertainment industry. Their conversation inspires confidence in Shalika; the next day she calls a magazine to announce that she will start working in teledramas. This opens more work opportunities and includes Rani in the teledrama.

Priya sees a clip from the serial on the bar's television set right before a fight between a regular client and an aggressive new client breaks out. Rani receives a call from the Colpetty police station with the message that a girl from a bar fight said that Rani was her mother. Rani responds, "The whole country knows I was never married." Priya is bitter about her childhood abandonment and makes it known to her mother that she still exists and that Rani is responsible for her current plight.

After the phone call and brief visit, Rani is visibly shaken. Shalika asks what is wrong, and Rani explains that she was discovered when her father worked as a light man in a studio. The owner noticed Rani and insisted that she start working in the industry. However, Rani was already married and had a year old daughter, and the studio could only work with a "virgin" star. Rani eventually separated from her husband and daughter, who were also paid off for the silence.

Once this secret is public knowledge, Rani decides to go to the karaoke bar to find Priya. Priya drives her away, further emotionally isolating herself. She asks Bunty to move in with her and help raise her soon-to-be-born baby. Rani continues looking for Priya, visiting the bar and Bunty's apartment.

Priya goes to the hospital and starts writing long extensive letters to Rani about her experiences growing up without her mother and with an alcoholic father. In the end Priya passes and Rani becomes the caretaker of Priya's baby girl.

== Cast ==
- Malini Fonseka as Sandhya Rani
- Nimmi Harasgama as Priya
- Dilhani Ekanayake as Shalika
- Samanalee Fonseka as Bunty
- Kaushalya Fernando as Mallika, Sandhya's sister
- Sanduni Fonseka as Teenage Sandhya Rani
- Jayani Senanayake as Leela
- Nirosha Perera as TV presenter
- Dayadeva Edirisinghe as Police Inspector
- Upeksha Swarnamali as Film actress
- Kumara Thirimadura as Karaoke client
- Thusitha Laknath
- Suraj Mapa
- Pubudu Chathuranga

== Music ==
The original music for Akasa Kusum was composed by Lakshman Joseph De Saram. The original soundtrack (OST) was also made into a promotional music video.

Track	Song	Singer(s)	Music	Lyrics	Duration
1	Akasa Kusum (Original Sound Track)	Saman Nishantha	Ranga Dasanayake	Upul Shantha Sanasgala	4:28

== Release ==
The film was released in Sri Lanka on 21 August 2009 and ran over 77 days across 24 screens in the country. It also received a limited release in Singapore from 18 June 2010, at Sinema Old School.

== Accolades ==
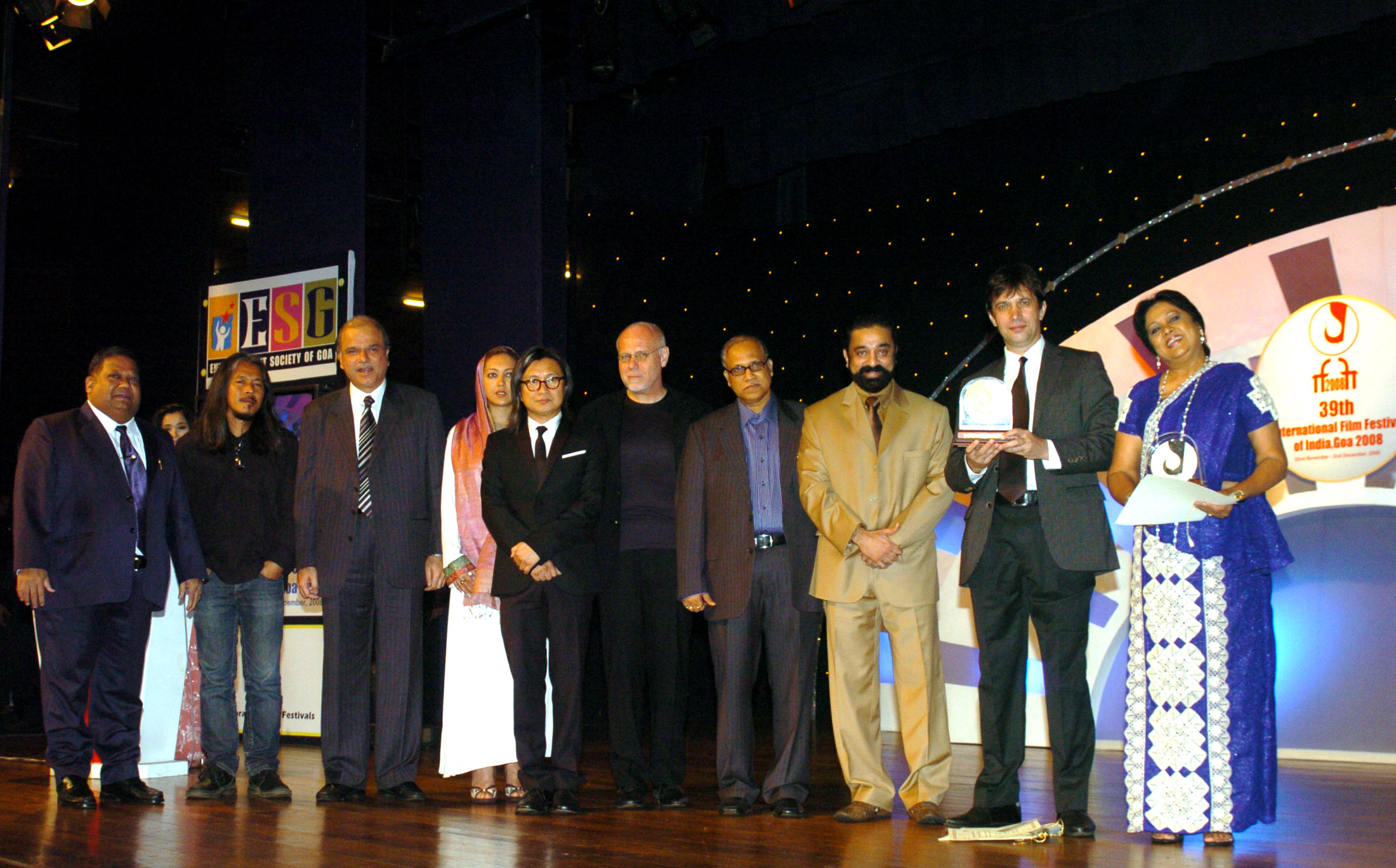
Malani Fonseka won Best Actress Award at the 2008 International Film Festival of India

- Silver Peacock Award (Best Actress – Malini Fonseka), Indian International Film Festival (IFFF), India
- Best Actress – Malini Fonseka, Levante International Film Festival, Italy
- Jury Special Mention Award, Vesoul Asian Film Festival, France
- Best Asian Film (NETPAC) Award – Granada Cinesdelsur Film Festival, Spain

'Akasa Kusum was originally Sri Lanka’s official entry for Best Foreign Language Film to the Academy Awards (Oscars) in 2010. It was replaced by Alimankada.

=== Official selections ===
- Pusan International Film Festival, Korea (World Premiere)
- Brisbane International Film Festival, Australia
  - Nominee, International Federation of Film Critics (FIPRESCI) Award
- Asia Pacific Screen Awards, Australia
  - Nominee, Best Actress Malini Fonseka
- International Film Festival of Kerala, India
- Palm Springs International Film Festival, United States
- Singapore International Film Festival, Singapore
- London Asian Film Festival, United Kingdom
