= Prasanna Vithanage =

Sri Lankan filmmaker (born 1962)

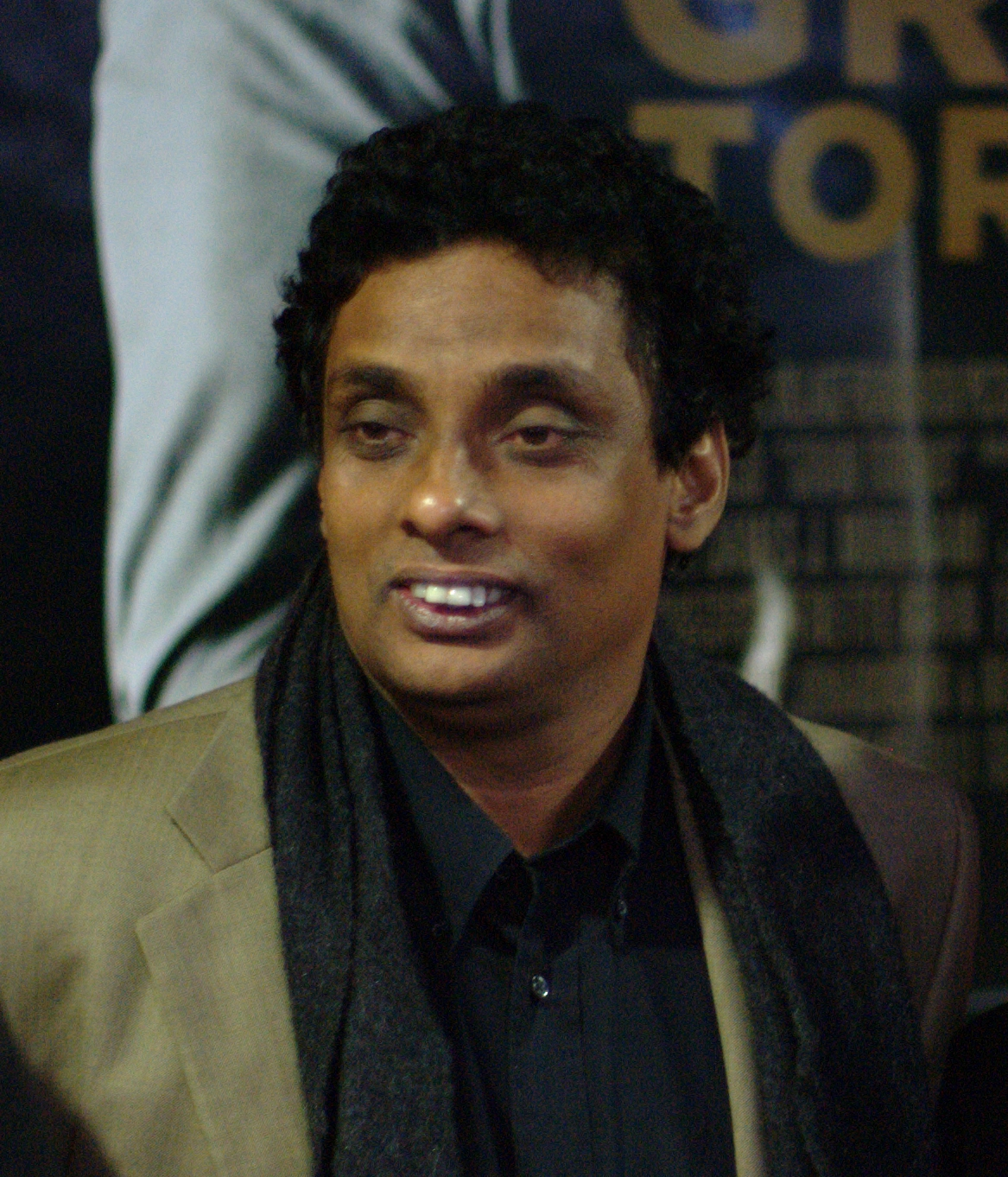
- Prasanna Vithanage during Vesoul International Film Festival of Asian Cinema, 2009
- Born: 14 March 1962 (age 63); Panadura, Western Province, Sri Lanka
- Occupation: Filmmaker
- Years active: 1980s–present
- Known for: Prasanna Vithanage Academy of Acting
- Spouse: Damayanthi Fonseka (m. 1991)
- Awards: Full list

Udaya Prasanna Vithanage (Sinhala: ප්‍රසන්න විතානගේ) (born 14 March 1962) is a Sri Lankan filmmaker. He is widely regarded as one of the most talented and influential filmmakers in South Asia. He is known for thought-provoking films that often deals with social, political and cultural issues. His films have received numerous awards accolades, both locally and internationally and have been praised for their innovative storytelling.

He has battled against the censorship in Sri Lanka and worked as an educator of cinema who has conducted many Master classes in the subcontinent for young filmmakers and enthusiasts. Prasanna Vithanage is also an activist and has been involved in human rights and peace initiatives.

== Filmography ==
Year	Title	Credited as			Notes	Ref(s)
Year	Title	Director	Producer	Writer	Notes	Ref(s)
1992	Sisila Giniganee	Yes	No	No	Directorial Debut	
1996	Anantha Rathriya	Yes	No	Yes		
1997	Pura Handa Kaluwara	Yes	Yes	Yes		
1997	Pavuru Valalu	Yes	No	No		
2003	Ira Madiyama	Yes	No	Yes	Co-written with Priyath Liyanage	
2008	Machan	No	Yes	No		
2008	Akasa Kusum	Yes	Yes	Yes		
2012	Oba Nathuwa Oba Ekka	Yes	No	Yes		
2015	Usaviya Nihandai	Yes	Yes	Yes	Documentary	
2017	Premaya Nam	No	Executive	No		
2018	Thundenek	Yes	No	Yes	Segment: "Her"; Co-written with Asoka Handagama & Vimukthi Jayasundara; Marketed as Her. Him. The Other	
2019	Gaadi	Yes	Yes	Yes		
2023	Bhagwan Bharose	No	Yes	No		
2023	Paradise	Yes	No	Yes	Co-written with Anushka Senanayake	Won Kim Jiseok award at the BIFF

Key
†	Denotes films that have not yet been released

== Awards ==
=== Ira Madiyama (August Sun) ===
- Grand Prix (Special Mention) "Le Regard d'or" – Fribourg International Film Festival 2004
- FIPRESCI Award – 17th Singapore International Film Festival 2004
- NETPAC Award – 17th Singapore International Film Festival 2004

=== Akasa Kusum (Flowers of the Sky) ===
Awards

- Best Actress – Malini Fonseka, Levante International Film Festival, Italy
- Best Actress – Malini Fonseka – SAARC Film Festival 2012

– Nominee, International Federation of Film Critics (FIPRESCI) Award

- Asia Pacific Screen Awards, Australia

– Nominee, Best Actress Malini Fonseka

- New Jersey Independent South Asian Cine Fest, US

=== Oba Nathuwa Oba Ekka (With You, Without You) ===
- Cyclo d'Or – Best Film, Vesoul International Film Festival
- NETPAC, Vesoul International Film Festival
- SIGNIS, Milano -African Asian Latin American Film Festival
- Silver Peacock Award (Best Actress – Anjali Patil), Indian International Film Festival (IFFF), India

=== Honours ===
- Jury member at the 2024 Busan International Film Festival for its competition section 'Kim Jiseok Award'.
