= Mandara (film) =

Mandara මන්දාරා
- Directed by: Priyantha Colombage
- Written by: Priyantha Colombage, Vajira Kasturi
- Produced by: Creative Force
- Starring: Chulakshi Ranathunga; Bimal Jayakodi; Megha Sooriyarachchi; Saheli Sadithma; Semini Iddamalgoda; Isuru Lokuhettiarachchi
- Cinematography: Ruwan Costa
- Edited by: Megha Kavinda Colombage
- Music by: Samantha Perera
- Distributed by: Blueshift Productions
- Release date: 26 July 2024
- Running time: 88 minutes
- Country: Sri Lanka
- Language: Sinhala

Mandara (Sinhala: මන්දාරා) a 2024 Sri Lankan Sinhala thriller drama film directed by Priyantha Colombage and produced by Mahen Perera for Creative Force and Blueshift Productions. It stars Chulakshi Ranathunga in the titular role along with Bimal Jayakodi, Megha Sooriyarachchi, Saheli Sadithma, Semini Iddamalgoda and Isuru Lokuhettiarachchi in supportive roles. The film is loosely based on three real stories that took place in recent Sri Lanka including missing of a child in Colombo hospital.

== Plot ==
The film revolves around four characters with different persona: sports star Mandara, engineer Vishwa, orphan heiress Yashora, and her uncle Bharatha.

== Cast ==
- Chulakshi Ranathunga as Mandara
- Megha Sooriyarachchi as Vishwa
- Bimal Jayakodi as Bharatha, Inoka's brother-in-law
- Saheli Sadithma as Yashora
- Semini Iddamalgoda as Mamaa
- Isuru Lokuhettiarachchi as Police OIC Kelum
- Madani Malwaththa as Inoka, Yashora's mother
- Chandani Seneviratne as Sudharma, Mandara's mother
- Lakshman Mendis as Soorya, Mandara's step father
- Dinakshie Priyasad as Kavi
- Priyankara Rathnayake as Police officer
- Chanuka Prabuddha
- Keerthi Ratnayake as Sene, Vishwa's father
- Vihanga Sooriyaarachchi as Mrs. Wijenayake, Bharatha's mother
- Muthu Tharanga as Vishwa's mother
- Chinthaka Vaas as Bakka
- Raja Ganesan
- Ajith Lokuge as Jayasena, Inoka's driver
- Wasantha Wittachchi
- Nayana Hettiarachchi as Shanika
- Ferni Roshini

=== child cast ===
- Anjana Sathyangani
- Chanum Jayakodi
- Kasun Malith
- Mal Mandiv
- Methika Navin
- Kavisha Udara

== Production ==
This is the 6th cinematic direction by Priyantha Colombage, who previously directed the films: Dehena (1998), Vimukthi (1998), Arumosam Wahi (2002), Adaraneeya Kathawak (2016), and Dedunu Akase (2017). The film is produced by Mahen Perera and screenplay co-written by director himself with Vajira Kasturi. Donal Jayantha is the first assistant director and Priyantha Pathirage with Niroshan Edirimanna are the second assistant directors. Cinematography handled by Ruwan Costa whereas editing, still photography and visual color combination done by Megha Kavinda Colombage. Diran Wijesinghe made sound design and recording, where feature writing by Nalin Prematilake and Ruchira Sanjeeva. Mangala Fernando and Leslie Weerasinghe are the art directors with the assistance by Amith Madduma Bandara. Clothing designed by Janaka Uladupitiya, choreography by Gayan Srimal, hair styling by Chamidu Ashek Liyanage. Sharaka Shyamal is the chief lighting engineer.

Special effects supervision carried out by Vishwa Colombage with the assistance of Alex Caldera. Production management included Palitha Thennakoon, Nimal Wijesiri Senadheera and Chinthana Srimal along with the product management support by Upul Gunasekara and Vasantha Veeradana. Music director is the Samantha Perera, where director himself and Nilar N. Kasim are the lyricists. Music composition done by Mahen Perera and Chitral Somapala. Song music composition by Chaturangana de Silva, Diran Wijesinghe. Bhachi Susan, Mihindu Ariyaratne, Kushani Sandarekha, Supun de Silva, Chitral Somapala and Aksha Chamudi made background vocals.

The screenplay was written using the lasering method and the contrasting scenes were used for filming. Muhurath ceremony was held on 24 October 2019 at the Mount Lavinia Hotel. The shooting was done in and around Colombo, Galle Fort, Galle Face Green, Ella, Badulla since 21 November 2019. However, shooting delayed in several times due to COVID-19 pandemic in throughout the country. The production crew hired a separate train from Colombo for a train scene where they filmed it for four days in Demodara and Ella areas.

== Release ==
The film was earlier scheduled to be released in September 2020, but later rescheduled to the end of the same year. However, the film took four years to release on 26 July 2024. The film is currently screening in 35 theaters across the island for 75 days, making revenue records.
