= Sirimal Wijesinghe =

Sri Lankan journalist, author, filmmaker, critic and activist

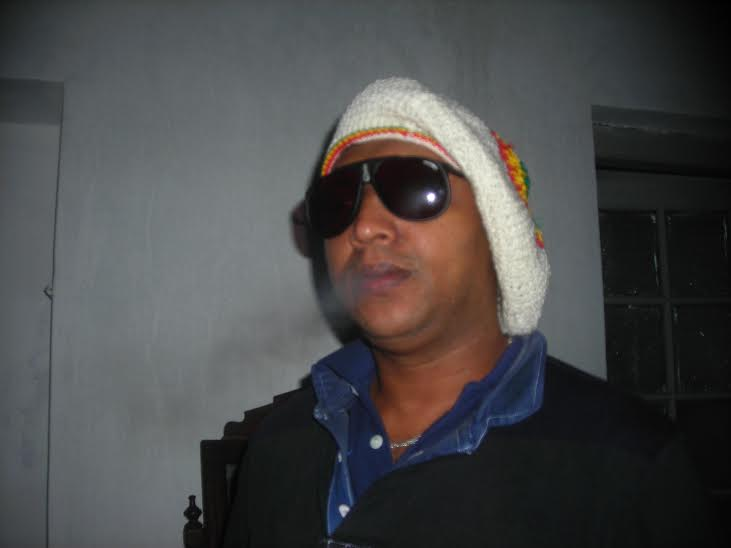
- Born: 31 March 1963 (age 62); Colombo, Sri Lanka
- Occupation: Author - Journalist - Film Director - Political activist
- Website: https://sirimalwijesinghe.com

Sirimal Wijesinghe is a Sri Lankan journalist, film director, and political activist. He was the founding editor of the controversial Sinhala youth magazine, Paradisaya. Wijesinghe was also one of the pioneers of the Colombo-based young political and cultural analysts who emerged in the decade of 1980, particularly after the advent of the open economic system.

== Journalism ==
Wijesinghe worked as an editor of newspapers or periodicals in Sri Lanka and is known for covering controversial topics with social and cultural analyses. His topics have ranged from politics, arts, culture and sexuality, presented in a more colloquial language comprising satire. Well-known social scientist Prof. Jayadewa Uyangoda once said he learnt to use a different and more effective writing style after reading Wijesinghe's articles.

=== Paaraadeesaya magazine ===
1990s popular sociocultural magazine Paradisaya (Paradise) was a brainchild of Sirimal Wijesinghe. Founded on 25 November 1998, Paradisaya became a huge success. Its controversial style and content caused controversy in the country. The magazine reflected Sirimal's steadfastness towards alternate youth politics – human rights, minority rights and sexual autonomy was explicit in his social mediation in Sri Lanka's cultural politics after the 1980s.

A popular post-modernist theoretician in Sri Lanka and the leader of the Sri Lanka Vanguard Party, Deepthi Kumara Gunaratne has said Wijesinghe who is first Politics teacher of me broke many existing social and cultural shackles when he edited Paradeesaya. Gunaratne has added: "Sirimal bravely discussed the subject of sexuality which had been vehemently suppressed in the mainstream media that time. Understandably, the following generation followed in his footsteps and brought sexual themes openly to the media. Sirimal can be considered one of the most pioneers in our journalism."

== Filmography ==
In 2008, Wijesinghe directed the children's feature film Pitasakwala Kumarayai Pancho Hathai. There he experimented in presenting a novel children's theme in Sinhala cinema.

Wijesinghe was also the dialogue writer of the award-winning Sinhala film Mille Soya directed by Boodee Keerthisena.

In 2012, Wijesinghe directed another 34-minute short film Full stop to police torture on the invitation of the Asian Human Rights Commission. Rights Now in collaboration with Asia Human Right Commission, produced the film. It was directed by Sirimal Wijesinghe.

He was also the script writer of the 2010 documentary Lunatic Heaven which was based on the gruesome incident where police clubbed to death a mentally handicapped youth in Bambalapitiya in front of general public. Most of the crew who contributed to produce this documentary received death threats and had to flee the country and now living in Netherlands under the political asylum.

Wijesinghe also comes in as an actor in the film How I Wonder What You Are directed by Chinthana Dharmadasa and Udaya Dharmawardhana.
