= Kasun Kalhara =

Sri Lankan musician (born 1981)

Kasun Kalhara Jayawardhana
- කසුන් කල්හාර
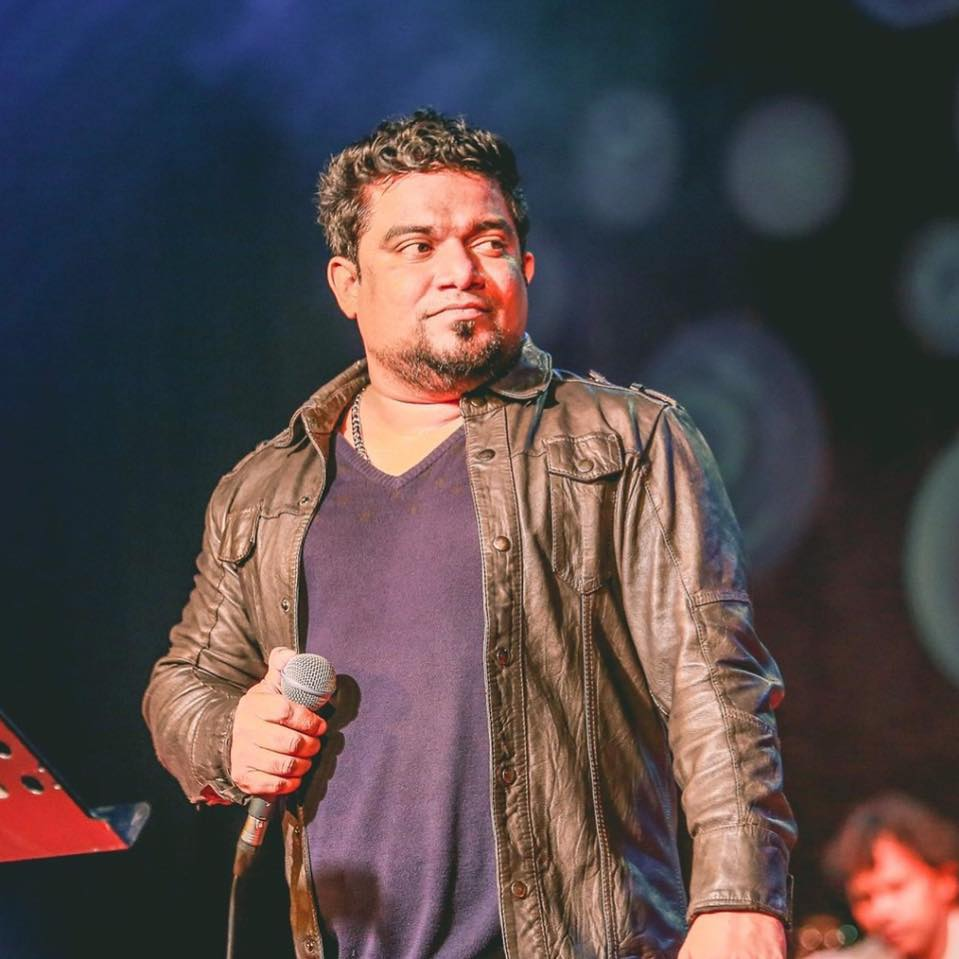
- Born: Kasun Kalhara Jayawardena; 3 November 1981 (age 45); Rajagiriya, Sri Lanka
- Occupations: Musician; producer
- Spouse: Kushani Sandarekha
- Parents: H. M. Jayawardena; Malani Bulathsinhala
- Musical career
- Genres: Experimental; classical; rock; pop; Latin
- Instruments: Vocals; guitar; piano; keyboard
- Years active: 1999–present

Kasun Kalhara Jayawardena (Sinhala: කසුන් කල්හාර ජයවර්ධන) (born 3 November 1981), known professionally as Kasun Kalhara, is a Sri Lankan singer, musician, vocal coach, composer, guitarist and record producer. During his musical career, Kasun has released three albums, Haritha Nimnaye, Radical Premaya and Romantic Opera. Widely regarded as one of the greatest singers Sri Lanka has produced, Jayawardena's singing voice has garnered acclaim from prominent musical peers and publications. He is one of the biggest and best-selling music artists in Sri Lankan history.

== Biography ==
Kasun's mother Malani Bulathsinhala, was a veteran vocalist and his father H. M. Jayawardena was a renowned composer as well. His younger sister, Nirmani Chaya died in 1991 at the age of three.

Kasun's music career started along with Indrachapa Liyanage and his schoolmates from Ananda College under the mentorship of Maestro K. M. Rathnapala in late 1999. His mother who was highly supportive of his musical career once answered a newspaper interviewer who asked "what is the most memorable day in your life?" with "the day Maestro Premasiri Khemadasa hugged and wished my son, following his first musical concert (Waves of Introspection). That warm hug from Maestro Kemadasa guaranteed that Kasun had a genuine talent and a clear future".

Kasun has held a number of solo concerts, collaborating with other artists such as "Kasun Kalhara: Live in Concert", "Kasun Kalhara Unforgettable Live in Concert", "The Black Red White Concert", "Kasun Kalhara in Culture Shock", "4U: Live in Concert" and "Love U: Live in Concert".

Kasun also performed in concerts: Culture Shock (2013) and Kasun Kalhara in LoveU (both in 2016 and 2017) which collectively became one of the most attended musical show trios in history of Sri Lanka with over 5,000 fans gathering around at the Nelum Pokuna Theatre. He was one of the judges of The Voice Sri Lanka seasons 1 and 2 along with Bathiya and Santhush, Sashika Nisansala and Umaria Sinhawansa.

== Filmography ==
=== Film ===
Year	Title	Role	Notes
2004	Aadaraneeya Wassaanaya	Playback singer	Song(s): Heenayaki Mata Adare
2006	Nilambare	Composer / playback singer	
2006	Eka Malaka Pethi	Composer	Co-composed with Rookantha Gunathilake and Nalin Perera
2006	Anjalika	Composer / playback singer	Song(s): Pama Wee Pipunu Mal Suwandai
2007	Sikuru Hathe	Singer	Song(s): Nilata Nile
2009	Kanyavi	Playback singer	
2009	Juliya	Additional music / playback singer	
2010	Uththara	Composer / playback singer	Song(s): Mal Mitak Thiyanna
2016	Adaraneeya Kathawak	Singer	Song(s): Adare, Me Obata Ahenawada, Ahasin Eha
2018	Goal	Singer	Song(s): Sansaraye Nawathenaka
2019	Thaala	Playback singer	Song(s): Roda Bandila, Gagane
2025	Ice Cream	Composer / playback singer	

=== Television ===
Year	Title	Channel	Language	Role
2017	Sahodaraya	ITN Sri Lanka	Sinhala	Composer / Singer
2020-21	The Voice Sri Lanka (Season 1)	Sirasa TV	Sinhala	Coach – Himself
2022-23	The Voice Sri Lanka (Season 2)	Sirasa TV	Sinhala	Coach – Himself

== Discography ==
=== Albums ===
Haritha Nimnaye (2001)
No.	Title	Length
1.	"Ananthayata Yana Para Dige"	05.19
2.	"Chiththa Kanyavi"	03.34
3.	"Tharu Ketayak Wee"	04:04
4.	"Sanda Sanda Wage"	03.17
5.	"Sanda Sanda Wage (Slow Version)"	03.04
6.	"Aadara Mal Wala"	03.30
7.	"Escape"	03.05
8.	"Hangum Mathuwee"	03.42
9.	"Walaakulak Wee"	05.31
10.	"Oba Pipunaa"	03.31
11.	"Mal Warusaawe"	03.30
12.	"Veenawee"	03.13
13.	"Wine Kendiye"	04.18
14.	"Kaulu Piyanpath"	03.45
15.	"Nathasha"	04.59
16.	"Aachariya"	03.33

Radical Premaya (2005)
No.	Title	Length
1.	"Eka Wasanthayaka"	04.05
2.	"Radical Premaya"	05.25
3.	"Sonduru Sithuwam"	03:38
4.	"Sithija Rekha"	03.56
5.	"Mal Mitak"	03.37
6.	"Lihiniyeku Se"	03.14
7.	"Susum Podhak Wee"	04.23
8.	"Worldless"	05.51
9.	"Appachchi"	03.58
10.	"There She Comes"	03.23
11.	"Sulanga Obadha"	03.48
12.	"Maname Kumari"	04.02
13.	"Irimaa Udaye"	04.10
14.	"Hasanganawee"	03.02
15.	"Daetha Wihidhaa"	03.55
16.	"Paawelaa Yanna"	03.32

Romantic Opera (2008)
No.	Title	Length
1.	"Heta Aluth Aluyamak"	03.29
2.	"Andhure"	04.51
3.	"Aadhare Sithum"	04.41
4.	"Rae Ahasin"	03.12
5.	"Leila"	03.51
6.	"Warna"	04.26
7.	"Pitastharayaa"	04.50
8.	"Sandha Onaa"	03.45
9.	"Kandhulu"	02.42
10.	"Obata Mathakadha Thawama"	04.15
11.	"Romanthika Operawa"	03.49
12.	"Mae Heenaye"	03.18
13.	"Haritha Wana Rekhawa"	02.46
14.	"Arambumama Kandulak Wela"	04.38

With other artists

- Aadaraneeya Wassaanaya (with Uresha Ravihari)
- Aathmaabhimaanayay (with Indrachapa Liyanage)
- Adare (Adaraneeya Kathawak Movie Song) (With Kushani Sandareka)
- Ahasin Eha (Adaraneeya Kathawak Movie Song) (Uresha Ravihari)
- Malakai Kiya (with Kushani Sandareka)
- Pamaawee Pipuna (with Indika Upamali and Uresha Ravihari)
- Raaththriya Manaram (with Nirosha Virajini)
- Samagi Samaadana (with Malani Bulathsinhala)
- Sanda Ahimi (with Pradeepa Dharmadasa)
- Sanda Eliya (Moonlight) (with Indrachapa Liyanage)
- Sara Sande (with Kushani Sandareka)
- Shuunya Wuu Nagaraye (with Samitha Mudunkotuwa)
- Sihinayata Tharam (with Prathibha Prabha)

=== Singles ===
- Sanda Mithuri (2009)
- Meedum Dumaraye (2009)
- Math Mal Sena (2011)
- Mata Kiya Denna (2011)
- Nawathi Methekin (2012)
- Adarema Geethayak (2013)
- Atheethaye Ma (2015)
- Kadadasi Oru (2015)
- Lowa Dutuwe Amma (2015)
- Lihiniye (2015)
- Ithin Hadamu Api Aluth Ratak (Let's Make A New Country) – Produced with Rookantha Gunathilake for the victory of New Democratic Front (Sri Lanka) at the 2015 Sri Lankan presidential election
- Sri Lanka Cricket Theme Song (2016)
- Varamale (2016)
- Me Obata Ahenawada (Adaraneeya Kathawak Movie Song 2016)
- Vasilissa (2016)
- Alaye Ghatha (2016)
- Nagena Bindena (2017)
- Melaa (2017)
- Wahilihiniye (2017)
- Nodaneema Awasan Una (2018)
- Nela (2018)
- Siyak Dahasak (2018)
- Hanthana Nathimuth J'Pure (2020)
- Ma Balawath Karana Samide (Sinhala Hymn) (2020)
- Roopakartha Adariye (2021)
- Ruwanarini (2021)
- Hitha Heena Aran (2021)
- Banchimaari (2022)
- Mage Diwi Pana Nala Rakinne (Sinhala Hymn) (2022)
- Paradeesaye Jawayai Me (2022)
- Matath Kaviyak Liyanna (2023)
- Bohoma Issara (2023)
- Swetha Rathriya (2024)
- Genimi (2024)

=== Political Campaign Songs ===
- Ithin Hadamu Api Aluth Ratak (Let's Make A New Country) - Presidential campaign of Ranil Wickremesinghe
- Ratakata Ona Apamana Agayak (2015) - Presidential campaign of Maithripala Sirisena
- Rata Anurata (2024) - Presidential campaign of Anura Kumara Dissanayake
