= Maria (2022 film) =

2022 Sri Lankan film

Maariya
- Sinhala: මාරියා
- Directed by: Aruna Jayawardene
- Written by: Aruna Jayawardene
- Produced by: Indrajith Silva
- Starring: Mahendra Perera; Hemal Ranasinghe; Ashan Dias; Darshan Dharmaraj
- Cinematography: Channa Deshapriya
- Edited by: Dilantha Perera
- Music by: Chinthaka Jayakodi
- Production company: Golden Rose Studio
- Distributed by: D&D Films
- Release date: 2022
- Country: Sri Lanka
- Language: Sinhala

Maariya (also known as The Ocean Angel) (Sinhala: මාරියා, romanized: Maariya) is a 2022 Sri Lankan Sinhala thriller film directed by Aruna Jayawardene and produced by Indrajith Silva for D&D Films. The film stars all-men cast including, Mahendra Perera, Hemal Ranasinghe, Ashan Dias, Darshan Dharmaraj, Priyantha Sirikumara, Dasun Pathirana, and Suran Dasanayake. The film is based on a true incident faced by a group of Indonesian fishermen.

It is notable that for the first time in Sinhala cinema, all the scenes of the film were filmed in the middle of the deep sea in Sri Lankan waters. The film participated in the 53rd International Film Festival of India. The film received positive reviews from critics.

== Plot ==
A group of friends who are engaged in fishing in the Indian Ocean by a multi-day fishing boat which belongs to different races, castes and religions. They are named Willy, Bennett, Anthony, Oscar, Dayya and Tenny. They engaged in this profession very peacefully and lovingly. Before the trawler leaves land, a young man named Marlon boards the trawler with the sole purpose of immigrating to Australia. His fishing friends meet him after a long journey from land. One day they see an unknown object floating in the sea and they direct it to their ship. With a restless mind, they come across a beautiful doll while examining it. Considering it as a gift from God, everyone tends to love a doll. Due to this incident, the mutual trust and friendship that had been built up among each other is broken and the team spirit is also lost. The ship's captain Willie and Bennett's efforts to reconcile each other are also futile. One day the doll is thrown into the sea but everyone jumps into the sea and tries to bring it back to the boat. One day Marlon and the doll disappear. In their search for him, Marlon's mobile phone is found. Everyone is shocked to see the video footage. With the intention of burying all the secrets, the phone is thrown into the sea. Friends who forget everything will rejoin the mission they came for. Madly in love, Marlon and the doll embrace each other at the bottom of the deep sea.

== Cast ==
The film has been made without involving any actress, marking the third such Sri Lankan film after Hara Lakshaya and Sandaluthalen Eha.

- Mahendra Perera as Captain Willy
- Hemal Ranasinghe as Antony 'Anta'
- Ashan Dias as Dayya
- Darshan Dharmaraj as Oscar
- Priyantha Sirikumara as Bennett 'Bena'
- Dasun Pathirana as Marlon
- Suran Dasanayake as Tenny

== Production ==
This is the fourth film directed by Aruna Jayawardena after 2013 award-winning film Nikini Vassa, and 2022 thriller Happy Birthday and 2024 thriller 1970 Love Story. He also made the screenplay and lyrics of the film, while the film is produced by Indrajith Silva. Assistant Director is Daminda Madawala, cinematography by Channa Deshapriya and Filming Steadicam and Underwater scenes are done by McLane Streiner Adams with the camera support by Prasad Rulsan, Dilipa Rangana, and Kasun Vimukthi.

The film is edited by Dilantha Perera, art direction and costume design by Sunil Premaratne, and feature writing by Priyanka Thilak Ratnayake. Sound design is done by Sashika Ruwan Marasinghe with sound editing assistance was given by Nanda Kumar and Aruna Munasinghe. Chinthaka Jayakodi made the music direction, Asanka Wickramasiri with color combination and DCP mastering, Malith Hagoda with subtitling and lighting support handled by Hiran Indika, Keerthi Vasantha.

== Release ==
After 39 years, the film has been qualified to represent Sri Lanka in the competitive section of the 44th Moscow International Film Festival in Moscow, Russia. In conjunction with this film festival, the organizing committee has planned to hold the premiere of the film "Maria" there.

The film was released on 21 November 2025 in Sri Lankan theaters.
