= Anjalee Liyanage =

Sri Lankan actress

- අංජලී ලියනගේ
- Born: March 29, 1983; Mount Lavinia, Sri Lanka
- Occupations: Actress, singer
- Years active: 2000–present
- Spouse(s): Indika Mallawarachchi (first), Tharindu Perera (current)
- Children: 1

Sudhasinha Liyanage Anjalee Poornika De Silva (born 29 March 1983), popularly known as Anjalee Liyanage, is a Sri Lankan actress.

== Early life and education ==
Anjalee was born in Mount-Lavinia, Sri Lanka, on 29 March 1983. Her father, Joseph Liyanage, served as the chief clerk at the harbour authority, and her mother, Chandi Chamari Perera, is a homemaker. She has two sisters.

She studied at Girls’ High School, Mount Lavinia, and completed her G.C.E. Ordinary Level in 1999 and Advanced Level (Arts stream) in 2002. During school, she was active in stage drama, dance, and performing arts. She trained in traditional Sri Lankan dance under Piyasara Shilpadhipathi and developed skills in both Udarata and Pahatharata and Sabaragamu Dance.

== Career ==
From her school days, Anjalee was active in stage drama and performing arts, participating in school stage plays and inter-school drama competitions.

In 2000, she entered the field of acting through the novel Bonda Meedum by Sujeewa Prasanna Arachchi, which helped her gain recognition among the youth audience. Later, she studied acting under veteran actress Anoja Weerasinghe at her acting academy.

Afterward, she took part in a stage drama directed by Bandula Vithanage, performing a minor role. Her first televised appearance was in the teledrama Doni. Her first lead role came with the teledrama Hima Kadulu, directed by Gihan Rohana, where she portrayed the character “Sadamini.”

In the television drama TV Derana ''Deweni Inima'', Anjalee Liyanage portrays the character Anusha. The series, directed by Saranga Mendis, gained popularity among Sri Lankan television audiences.

She has appeared in many popular teledramas.

=== Selected Television Serials ===
- Adare Ahasa Tharam
- Deweni Inima
- Hiru Dahasak Yata
- Monara Thenna
- Pabalu Palama
- Ralla Weralata Adarei
- Sihina Sakmana
- Siri Wasala

== Filmography ==
Year	Film	Role	Director
2016	Adaraneeya Kathawak		Priyantha Colombage
	Hero Nero		Nishantha Pradeep
2015	Address Na		Jackson Anthony
2023	Thattu Deke Iskole		Lalith Rohitha Edirisinghe

== Stage play roles ==
year	Drama	Role	Director
	Nonawaru Samaga Mahathwaru		Priyantha Samarakoon
	Romaya Gini Gani		Nalaka Vithanage

== Personal life ==
Anjalee was first married to Indika Mallawarachchi and they have a daughter, Dinuli Mallawarachchi. She later married Tharindu Perera, a singer, percussionist, music director, and band leader of Pearl Jam.
