= Eka Malaka Pethi =

Eka Malaka Pethi එක මලක පෙති
- Directed by: Mohan Niyaz
- Written by: Mohan Niyaz
- Produced by: Silumina Films
- Starring: Nalin Perera; Reema Ginger; Roshan Pilapitiya
- Cinematography: Andrew Jayamanne
- Music by: Rookantha Gunathilake; Nalin Perera; Kasun Kalhara
- Distributed by: CEL Theatres
- Release date: 3 March 2006
- Country: Sri Lanka
- Language: Sinhala

Eka Malaka Pethi (Petals of Desire) (Sinhala: එක මලක පෙති) is a 2006 Sri Lankan Sinhala drama romantic film directed by Mohan Niyaz and produced by Jagath Wijenayake for Silumina Films. It stars popular singer Nalin Perera in his debut acting, with another popular female singer Reema Ginger in the lead role along with Roshan Pilapitiya and Rex Kodippili. Music was co-composed by Rookantha Gunathilake, Nalin Perera and Kasun Kalhara. It is the 1165th Sri Lankan film in the Sinhala cinema.

== Cast ==
- Nalin Perera as Mahela Wijenayake
- Reema Ginger as Nirasha
- Roshan Pilapitiya as Arun Basnayake
- Rex Kodippili as Mahela's father
- Manel Wanaguru as Arun's mother
- Gnananga Gunawardena as Arun's father
- Maureen Charuni as Mahela's mother
- Buddhika Jayaratne as Kuma
- Anarkali Akarsha as Taniya
- Manel Wanaguru
