= Aruni Rajapaksha =

Sri Lankan actress and model (born 1984)

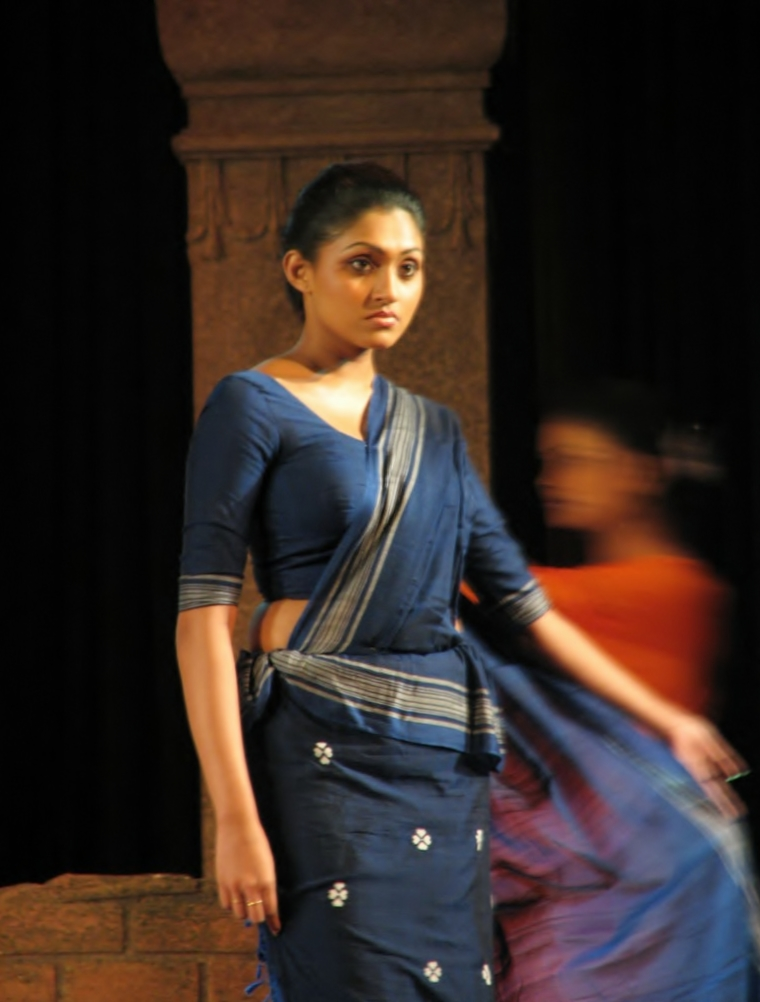
- Rajapaksha in 2006
- Born: අරුණි රාජපක්ෂ; 5 January 1984; Kalpitiya, Puttalam District
- Spouse: Nalin Samarawickrama (m. 2015)
- Children: Diara Samarawickrama, Inara Samarawickrama
- Modeling information
- Height: 173 cm (5 ft 8 in)
- Hair color: Black
- Eye color: Brown
- Website: arunirajapaksha.com

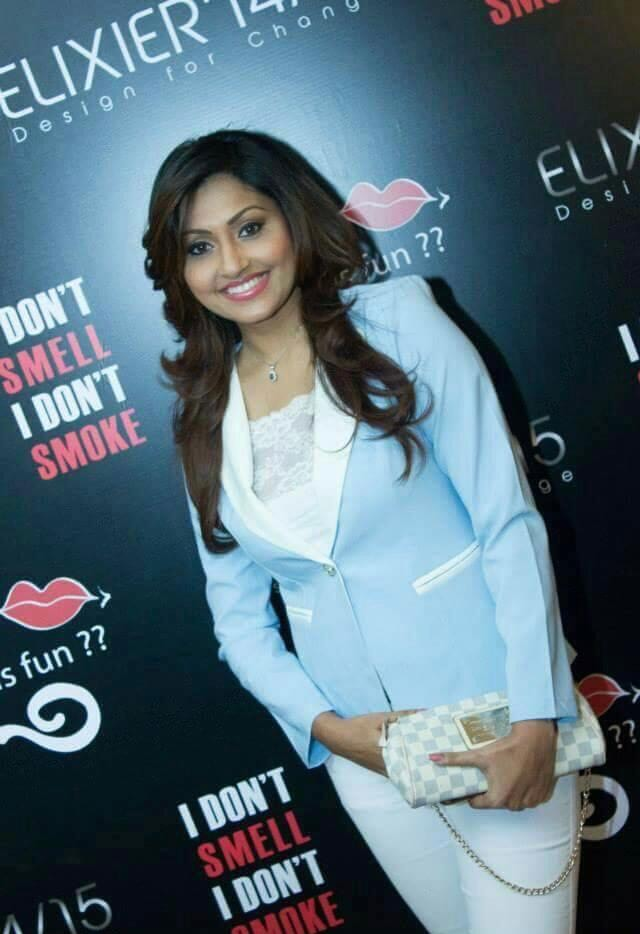
Aruni in 2015

Aruni Rajapaksha is a Sri Lankan model, actress, TV host and beauty pageant titleholder.

== Personal life ==
Aruni Rajapaksha was born in Kalpitiya, Sri Lanka, and raised in Kandy. After taking the G.C.E. Advanced Level examination, Aruni joined the Kandy Technical College to do a secretarial course. During that period, she organized fashion shows in Kandy leading her to take on a career in modelling. Aruni is married to Nalin Samarawickrama and mother of twin girls.

== Career ==
In 2004, Aruni won the title of Udarata Menike and the Capri Beauty queen 2005 crown.

Aruni has also worked as a host for various shows such as "Hello Sri Lanka" and "Liyasevana".

== Filmography ==
Year	Film	Role	Other notes
2012	Super six	Sherin	Main actress
2015	Maharaja Gemunu	Kalu Menika	Supportive actress
2015	Address Na (No Address)	Nathalia	Supportive actress
2016	Paththini	Madhavi	Supportive actress
2016	Adaraneeya Kathawak (A Melody of Love)	Dewli	Musical movie

Awards and achievements
Preceded by Jacqueline Fernandez	Miss Universe Sri Lanka; 2007	Succeeded by Faith Landers
