= Chulakshi Ranathunga =

Sri Lankan actress and model

- Born: Chulakshi Saubhagya Ranathunga; 11 February 1989 (age 37); Colombo, Sri Lanka
- Other name: Chula
- Education: Maliyadeva Girls' College
- Occupations: Model, Actress
- Years active: 2014-present
- Awards: Miss Sri Lanka 2013

Chulakshi Saubhagya Ranathunga (Sinhala: චූලක්ෂි සෞභාග්‍යා රණතුංග) (born 13 February 1989) is a Sri Lankan actress, model and beauty pageant titleholder. She was the winner of the Miss Sri Lanka title in 2014. She represented Sri Lanka in the Miss World 2014 pageant held on 14 December 2014 at ExCeL London.

== Personal life ==
Ranathunga was born on 11 February 1989 in Colombo, Sri Lanka as the second of the family. She completed education from Maliyadeva Girls' College, where she excelled in basketball for national level. She has one elder brother.

== Career ==
In 2014, Ranathunga won the Miss Sri Lanka crown and represented Sri Lanka in the Miss World competition held in England in 2014. She has studied acting under Kaushalya Fernando.

She also made her debut appearance in the film Dedunu Akase in 2017, where she is the lead actress opposite to Hemal Ranasinghe. The film became a commercial success and established Ranathunga as a film actress. In the same year, she acted in the thriller film Nilanjana in a supportive role. In 2019, she acted in the Sunil Ariyaratne's historical film Vijayaba Kollaya second time opposite to Hemal. She won the award for the Best Supporting Actress for her role "Hamidumma" at the Sarasaviya Awards in 2024.

In 2021, she played the lead role in the adult thriller film Ginimal Pokuru and then made supportive roles in the preceding films Gindari 2 and Guththila. In 2024, she played the titular role in the thriller film Mandara. In 2025, she played the lead role in the comedy film House Full, second time opposite to Isuru Lokuhettiarachchi after Ginimal Pokuru.

== Filmography ==
Key
†	Denotes films that have not yet been released

Year	Film	Role	Notes
2017	Dedunu Akase	Vihangi	
2017	Nilanjana	Amanda	
2019	Vijayaba Kollaya	Hamiduma	
2021	Ginimal Pokuru	Piyumi	
2022	Gindari 2	Devil princess	
2023	Lockdown		
2023	Guththila	Princess	
2023	Midunu Vishwaya	Danny - Sumadya	
2024	Mandara	Mandara	
2025	House Full	Umeshi	
TBA	Case Number 447 †	filming	
TBA	Replica †	Ashan's girlfriend	
TBA	Meeduma Tharanaya †		
TBA	Tikiri Kumaruge Mulleriya Satana †		
