= Indrachapa Liyanage =

Sri Lankan singer and musician (born 1981)

Indrachapa Liyanage ඉන්ද්‍රචාපා ලියනගේ
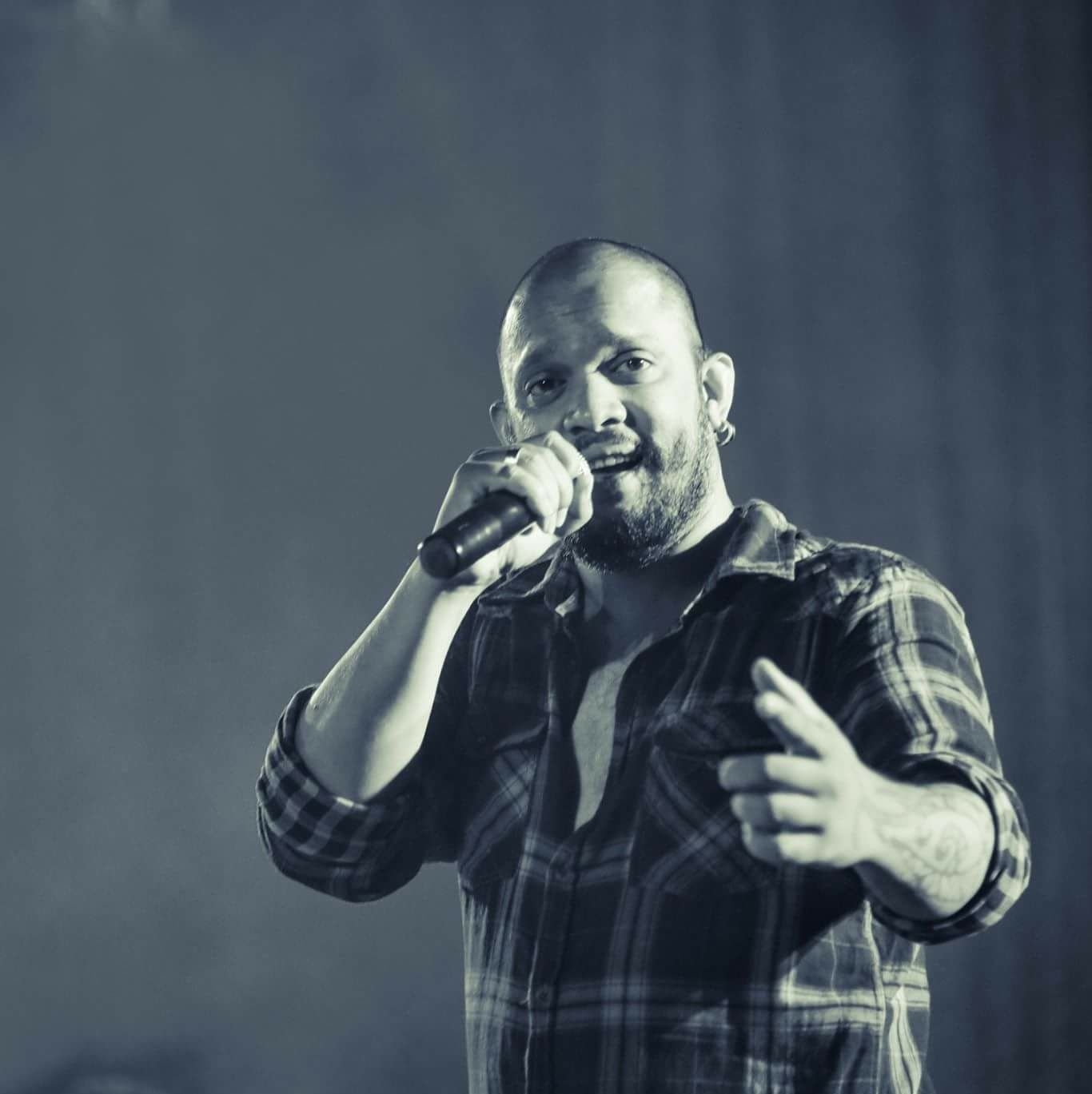
- Liyanage performing at Acoustic Brew in 2010

Background information
- Born: Indrachapa Liyanage; 13 May 1981 (age 44); Colombo, Sri Lanka
- Genres: Rock; Pop
- Occupations: Singer; Musician; Record producer; Composer
- Instruments: Vocals; Guitar
- Years active: 2000–present
- Spouse: Samanalee Fonseka
- Website: indrachapaliyanage.com

Indrachapa Liyanage (Sinhala: ඉන්ද්‍රචාපා ලියනගේ; born 13 May 1981) is a Sri Lankan singer, musician, record producer, and composer known for his contributions to rock and pop music, as well as his work in film music and social activism.

== Biography ==
Indrachapa Liyanage was born in Colombo, Sri Lanka, on 13 May 1981. He attended Royal College, Horana, and later Ananda College, Colombo. His music career began in the late 1990s at Ananda College, where he collaborated with schoolmates, including Kasun Kalhara, under the guidance of K. M. Rathnapala. They formed a band and released the album Haritha Nimnaye in 2001, which gained popularity among local audiences. By 2005, the group disbanded, and Liyanage pursued a solo career, focusing on rock music with influences from Sri Lankan musical traditions.

== Career ==
Liyanage has released three albums: Haritha Nimnaye (2001, with Kasun Kalhara), Radical Premaya (2004, with Kasun Kalhara), and Abinishkramanaya (2007).

He has performed at numerous concerts in Sri Lanka and internationally, often with artists like Kasun Kalhara, Nadeeka Guruge, and Nadeeka Jayawardena. Notable performances include the Culture Shock concert in 2013, Nadeeka Guruge's Echo in the Mountain in Nuwara Eliya in 2015, and the 4U concert at Ave Maria Stadium, Negombo, on 24 September 2024. In 2023, he performed two concerts with Kalhara and others, drawing significant crowds.

Liyanage has composed music for films, debuting with Avilenasului (2020), for which he won the Best Musical Score at the Signis Awards. He also sang songs for the film Saho (2020).

== Social activism ==
In 2022, Liyanage and actress Samanalee Fonseka performed a Sinhala cover of Bella ciao titled Enawado during the 2022 Sri Lankan protests, released with the National People's Power.

In 2024, they were among 26 Sri Lankans arrested and released in Kuwait during a musical event organised by the JVP-affiliated Ethera Api.

In 2015, Liyanage was among artists attacked during a political campaign in Kumbukgeta, supporting Maithripala Sirisena.

== Personal life ==
Liyanage is the youngest of four brothers, including actor Saumya Liyanage. His father, Hemasiri Liyanage, was a prominent Sri Lankan actor. He is married to actress Samanalee Fonseka.

== Discography ==
=== Albums ===
- Haritha Nimnaye (2001, with Kasun Kalhara)
- Radical Premaya (2004, with Kasun Kalhara)
- Abinishkramanaya (2007)

=== Singles ===
- "Enawado" (2022, with Samanalee Fonseka)
