= Happy Birthday (2022 Sri Lankan film) =

2022 Sri Lankan film

- Sinhala: හැපි බර්ත් ඩේ
- Directed by: Aruna Jayawardena
- Written by: Aruna Jayawardena
- Produced by: The Capital Maharaja Organization Limited
- Starring: Dilhani Ekanayake; Isuru Lokuhettiarachchi; Tashi Kalidasa; Surya Dayaruwan; Randika Goonetileke
- Cinematography: Channa Deshapriya
- Edited by: Asanka Wickramasiri
- Music by: Chinthaka Jayakodi
- Production company: M Entertainments
- Distributed by: LFD & CEL Theatres
- Release date: March 24, 2022
- Country: Sri Lanka
- Language: Sinhala

Happy Birthday (Sinhala: හැපි බර්ත් ඩේ) is a 2022 Sri Lankan Sinhala action mystery thriller film directed by Aruna Jayawardena and produced by The Capital Maharaja Organization Limited as a Stein Film, and distributed by M Entertainments. The film stars Dilhani Ekanayake and Isuru Lokuhettiarachchi in lead roles whereas Tashi Kalidasa, Yohani Hettiarachchi, Surya Dayaruwan and Randika Goonetileke made supportive roles.

The premiere of the film was held in April 2022 at the Scope City Cinema, Colombo. The film received mixed reviews from critics.

== Plot ==
The widow Nita Saparamadu and her two daughters Natalie and Venuki now live in Nita's father's spacious bungalow. Her father Saparamadu was a millionaire. It has been a month since he died. So Nita decided to celebrate her daughter's 18th birthday at this house, though not too big. Before Saparamadu's death, all of his estate was transferred to Nita's eldest daughter, Natalie. Victor, a close associate of Mr. Saparamadu knew this secret. From then on Victor began to draw a plan which was launched on this birthday celebration. Nita had a mysterious incident when she came to this bungalow with her two daughters in which Manika, the housemaid was disappeared. The story then revolves around Nita Saparamadu's attempt to protect her two daughters from these unknown thugs.

== Cast ==
- Dilhani Ekanayake as Nita Saparamadu
- Tashi Kalidasa as Natalie, Nita's eldest daughter
- Isuru Lokuhettiarachchi as Victor
- Surya Dayaruwan
- Randika Goonetileke
- Suranga Ranawaka as Menika
- Yohani Hettiarachchi as Venuki, Nita's younger daughter
- Bandula Sooriyabandara as Mr. Saparamadu, Nita's father
- Prasanna Dakumpitiya
- Sunil Premaratne as Lawyer Samaradiwakara

== Production ==
The film marked as the fourth film of Aruna Jayawardena after Nikini Vassa, 1970 Love Story, and Maria. This is the ninth film produced by the Maharaja Company Limited, which has produced films such as Dancing Star, Dharmayuddhaya, Thee, A Level, Goal, Udumbara, U Turn and Thala. Although Yohani Hettiarachchi has been involved in a number of films before, this is Tashia Kalidasa's first cinematic experience. Editing and color combination done by Asanka Wickramasiri, and film was co-directed by Amila Pahathagedara. Art direction has done by Sunil Premaratne, production by Priyantha Ratnayake, production management by Gihan Perera and costume design by Malki Wijemanne. Sound design has done by Sasika Ruwan Marasinghe whereas Malki Wijemanne has contributed with lyrics to the film. Sunil Premaratne, who was the artistic director, can also be seen in the role of a lawyer

== Soundtrack ==
The film consists of a single song.

No.	Title	Lyrics	Singer(s)	Length
1.	"Man Kiyannada Rahasak"	Malki Wijemanne	Ayisha Shamrin
