= Ginimal Pokuru =

- Sinhala: ගිනිමල් පොකුරු
- Directed by: Udayakantha Warnasuriya
- Written by: Udayakantha Warnasuriya
- Produced by: Prasad Rodrigo; Bandula Gunawardena; Krishantha Hettiarachchi; Nishantha Jayawardena; Udayanga Suresh; Suranga de Alwis; Newton Vidanapathirana
- Starring: Isuru Lokuhettiarachchi; Chulakshi Ranathunga; Charith Abeysinghe
- Cinematography: Ayeshmantha Hettiarachchi
- Edited by: Chandana Sonnadara
- Music by: Sarath de Alwis
- Distributed by: LFD and CEL Theatres
- Release date: 3 December 2021
- Running time: 120 min
- Country: Sri Lanka
- Language: Sinhala

Ginimal Pokuru (Sinhala: ගිනිමල් පොකුරු, lit. 'Flowers of Fire') is a 2021 Sri Lankan Sinhala adult romantic film directed by Udayakantha Warnasuriya. The film is co-produced by Prasad Rodrigo, Bandula Gunawardena, Krishantha Hettiarachchi, Nishantha Jayawardena, Udayanga Suresh, Suranga de Alwis and Newton Vidanapathirana for U Creations. It stars Isuru Lokuhettiarachchi, Chulakshi Ranathunga and Charith Abeysinghe in lead role whereas Ananda Kumaraunnahe, Dilrufa Shanas and Kumara Wanduressa made supportive roles.

== Production ==
This is the 25th cinematic feature film directed by Udayakantha Warnasuriya. The filming began on 22 April 2021, but postponed due to COVID-19 pandemic in the country after few shooting schedule. The rest of the filming was started on 15 August 2021. Cinematography was done by Ayeshmantha Hettiarachchi, edited by Praveen Jayaratne, assisted by Donald Jayantha and art direction by Eheliyagoda Somathilaka. Sarath de Alwis is the music director, Indika Udaralanka is the costume designer and Ashoka Ariyaratne is the production manager.

== Cast ==
- Isuru Lokuhettiarachchi as Ranga
- Chulakshi Ranathunga as Piyumi
- Charith Abeysinghe as Lasith
- Ananda Kumaraunnahe
- Dilrufa Shanas as Tharushi
- Kumara Wanduressa

== Release ==
For the first time in the history of Sri Lankan cinema, two cinema boards came together to screen the film: LFD and CEL cinema boards. The film is based on a true story that took place in Sri Lanka twenty years ago. The Performance Board certified the film as an adults-only film and the film was released on 3 December 2021.
