= Thaala =

- තාල
- Directed by: Paalitha Perera
- Written by: Paalitha Perera; Nadee Kammalweera
- Produced by: Nilan Weerasinghe
- Starring: Hemal Ranasinghe; Kalani Dodantenna; Jayalath Manoratne
- Cinematography: Chinthaka Somakeerthi
- Edited by: Tissa Surendra
- Music by: Chinthaka Jayakody
- Production company: MEntertainments
- Distributed by: EAP Theaters
- Release date: 31 January 2019
- Country: Sri Lanka
- Language: Sinhala

Thaala (Sinhala: තාල) is a 2019 Sri Lankan Sinhalese musical drama film directed by Paalitha Perera and produced by Nilan Weerasinghe for MEntertainment production as a Sirasa Movie. It stars Hemal Ranasinghe and Kalani Dodantenna in lead roles along with Jayalath Manoratne and Kaushalya Fernando. The music is composed by Chinthaka Jayakody. It is the 1322nd Sri Lankan film in the Sinhala cinema.

Asela, a young teacher comes to the Hatagala Elementary School situated in a remote rural village. In a short period of time, he is able to create a new educational awakening in the school with attractive, teaching methods.

== Cast ==
- Hemal Ranasinghe as Asela Danturebandara
- Kalani Dodantenna as Arundathi Esmeralda Divithotawila
- Jayalath Manoratne as Principal, Mr. Hewanayake
- Kaushalya Fernando as Amaravathi
- Chandani Seneviratne
- Priyantha Sirikumara as Osukula
- Wilson GunaratneSecretary Senaratne
- Giriraj Kaushalya as Kattadiya
- Chamila Peiris as local politician
- Wageesha Salgadu
- Danushka Dias
- Pradeep Ramawickrama as Baasu
- Nimash Dulantha as Roshan
- Nadeeshani Peliarachchi as Nisansala
- Priyanka Samaraweera
- Ruwan Madanayake

== Soundtrack ==
1st single of the soundtrack; 'Moda Band' written by Asoka Handagama was released under M Entertainments label on 9 January 2019. The soundtrack was composed by Chinthaka Jayakody. The album consists of six tracks and was received positively.

No.	Title	Lyrics	Singer(s)	Length
1.	"Kan Kan Kan"	Dr. Anuradha Mahasinghe	Chamila Madushan	02.05
2.	"Roda Bandila"	Dr. Anuradha Mahasinghe	Kasun Kalhara	04.08
3.	"Moda Band"	Asoka Handagama	Various Artists	01.46
4.	"Gagane"	Dr. Anuradha Mahasinghe	Kasun Kalhara	03.47
5.	"Katawath Ba"	Thisara Mangala Bandara	Chamila Madushan	02.21
6.	"Roda Bandila"	Dr. Anuradha Mahasinghe	Kushani Sandareka Ft. Kasun Kalhara	03.06
