= Dedunu Akase =

- Theatrical release poster
- දේදුණු ආකාසේ
- Directed by: Priyantha Colombage
- Written by: Tharaka Herath Dhamunumulla
- Produced by: Swarnavahini Films
- Starring: Hemal Ranasinghe; Chulakshi Ranathunga; Teena Shanel Fernando; Shriyani Amarasena; Mike Fernando
- Cinematography: Ranga S. Bandara
- Edited by: Megha Colombage; Diran Wijesinghe
- Music by: Udara Samaraweera
- Production company: Creative Force
- Distributed by: Colambage Films
- Release date: 12 October 2017
- Country: Sri Lanka
- Language: Sinhala
- Box office: 9.5 LKR Crores

Dedunu Akase ('Mirror of Life; Sinhala: දේදුණු ආකාසේ) is a 2017 Sri Lankan Sinhala romantic film directed by Priyantha Colombage and produced by EAP Network Swarnavahini Production. It stars Hemal Ranasinghe in the lead role, along with newcomers Chulakshi Ranathunga and Teena Shanel Fernando. The music was composed by Udara Samaraweera. It is the 1288th Sri Lankan film in the Sinhala cinema.

Supporting actor Dasun Nishan committed suicide on 27 September 2017, prior to the screening of the film. The muhurath ceremony was held at Galadari Hotel, Colombo. The film has received mixed reviews from critics.

== Plot ==
While the dancing troupe of a college was practicing for a competition, one of their members get injured. To fill up the space, the teacher decides to join Pavani who's a very attractive girl from the junior batch and the new roommate of Vihangi who's a leading dancer in the troupe. Vihangi is in love with a boy named Samudra who's also a leading dancer in the troupe, but even though she gives him so many hints about that, he never seems to understand. Time flies and after they leave college everyone's on their own separate paths in life.

Samudra becomes a famous dancer in the country. His parents arrange for him a marriage to a family his father is friends with and the proposed girl turns out to be Pavani from his college. They're both surprised and start to think they just met each other's soulmates. They then happily marry and move to their own house. On the same day, Samudra hands over a pile of letters and asks Pavani to check them and separate the bills for him and Pavani comes across a letter from Vihangi in the pile. The letter says she's carrying Samudra's baby with all her love which makes Pavani stressed out. She doesn't tell this to Samudra. Samudra finds Pavani stressed out, so to make her happy, he decides to take her on a ride in his fast car and they are met with an accident where Pavani dies. Samudra is left alone with the guilt that he killed his own wife.

=== 8 years Later ===
Vihangi's daughter, Sayuri grows up and lives with her mother and grandfather. But she never has seen her father. Even though Vihangi is a great dancer, Sayuri hates dancing. One day at school, Sayuri finds a pretty, young lady (Pavani's soul) playing the piano in a quiet place at her school and the lady speaks to her. Pavani says she knows Vihangi and asks Sayuri if she knows who her father is. As the person who received that letter and destroyed it, she felt like it was her responsibility to introduce Samudra to Sayuri. Pavani convinces Sayuri to dance in the inter-school ballet competition and practices her for that, promising, in the end, she would bring her father to her. Sayuri agrees.

A colleague of Samudra visits him during one of Samudra's visits to Sri Lanka and says Vihangi is now a teacher at a rural school and they decide to go see their old friend. But they couldn't meet her as she wasn't home that day.

A few days later Samudra receives an invitation as the chief guest for the winner's welcoming ceremony from the school of the winner of a competition he judged recently. During the ceremony, when the compere asks Sayuri who taught her to dance so well, she tells her father taught and adds that she's never seen him. It turns out that Vihangi's daughter is the winner. Vihangi invites Samudra to come over to her place for tea and Samudra politely asks her why her husband isn't home in reply she says he never came home and recalls the party on their last day of college where everything happened after everyone got drunk and high. Samudra then realizes that Sayuri is his daughter, but Vihangi says it's okay to stay away from things because she doesn't want another woman on earth to be left alone feeling the same as her. Samudra explains to her how his life collapsed as Pavani died due to his carelessness. In the end, Vihangi forgives Samudra and they both forget their dull pasts, and Sayuri finds her father and they live happily ever after as a beautiful family, all thanks to Pavani.

== Cast ==
- Hemal Ranasinghe as Samudhra Bandara Dissanayake
- Chulakshi Ranathunga as Vihangi
- Teena Shanell Fernando as Pawani
- Saheli Sadithma as Sayuri
- Bimal Jayakody as Ramesh
- Dasun Nishan as Malith
- Jayalath Manoratne as Vihangi's father
- Priyankara Rathnayake as Dance Teacher
- Tharindu Kavinda
- Sriyani Amarasena as Vajira
- Mike Fernando as Sagara Dissanayake
- Kumara Jayakantha as Mr. Rathnayake
- Daya Tennakoon as Peter
- Meena Kumari as Samanthika

== Songs ==
| No. | Title | Lyrics | Singer(s) | Length |
|---|---|---|---|---|
| 1. | "Sihinaya Pupura Yay" | Priyantha Colambage | Chitral Somapala |
| 2. | "Mal Kalamba Laga" | Upul Shantha Sannasgala | Udesh Indula, Kushani Sandareka |
| 3. | "Selfie Langa Natida" | Priyantha Colambage | Nadimal Perera, Sanuka Wickramasinghe |
| 4. | "Bhawayen Bhawe" | Nandana Wickramage | Uresha Ravihari, Mihindu Ariyaratne |
| 5. | "Mal Kalamba" | Upul Shantha Sannasgala | Uresha Ravihari |

== Box office ==
The film successfully passed 50 days in theatres by earning more than 9 crore of SLR.
