= St. Mary's College, Chilaw =

Location
- Chilaw; Sri Lanka
- Coordinates: 7.582412°N 79.796212°E

Information
- Type: Public
- Motto: Potest Qui Vult; Latin - (We can if we but try!)
- Established: 1 May 1933; 92 years ago
- Founder: Caesar Albert
- Principal: Janaka Nishantha
- Grades: Class 6 - 13
- Gender: Boys
- Age: 11 to 19
- Enrollment: 2500
- Campus: 5 acres (20,000 m^{2})
- Colours: Black, gold and blue
- Pupils: Maryite’s

St. Mary's College, Chilaw is one of the oldest English educational institutes of past Ceylon. St. Mary's College is a provincial school, which provides secondary education.

== History ==
St. Mary's College, Chilaw was established as St. Mary's English School. It was founded in the premises of G. S. Perera at Jetty Street Chilaw. In 1905 the school was shifted to the Queen Victoria Memorial Hall, which was situated near the cathedral of Chilaw.

On 1 May 1933, the college handed over the administration to the De La Salle brothers and shifted to the current location, its first director was Rev. Bro. Caesar Albert.

It was a mixed school of girls and boys where the former principals were Rev. Father Joseph David Fernando and J. Robert Fernando who were attached to community of Oblates Mary immaculate. Messrs Len Karunaratne, Peter Lawrence Perera, A. G. Cambal and Roach were former head masters.

Sinhala, Tamil, English languages which were converted to multilingual medium college on 1 May 1933, handed over the administration to the De La Salle brothers and its first director was Rev. Bro. Caesar Albert.

== The college today ==
The college provides education to 2,500 students from grade 6 to grade 13. It is governed by the Roman Catholic Diocese of Chilaw and the provincial Government.

== College crest ==
- Ocean
- Shining Star
- AM (Ave Maria)
- Motto - "Potest Qvi Vult"

The shining star, also known as the ocean star, symbolises Our Lady of Mount Carmel.

== College houses ==
- De Costa House
- Camillus House
- Robert House
- De La Salle House

== Past principals (rectors) ==
| Name | From | To |
|---|---|---|
| Bro.Caesar Albert | 01.05.1933 | 1935 |
| Bro.Theodoret of Mary | 17.06.1935 | 1939 |
| Bro.Antony Francis | 30.04.1939 | 1940 |
| Bro.Vaclay Maria | 25.08.1940 | 1943 |
| Bro.Hermenegild (acting | 05.11.1943 | 1944 |
| Bro.Caesar Albert | 16.01.1944 | 1945 |
| Bro.Cassian of Jesus | 10.04.1945 | 1946 |
| Bro.Hugh Faringdon | 01.01.1947 | 1948 |
| Bro.Anselm Calixtus | 01.09.1948 | 1950 |
Bro.Hugh Faringdon
| Bro.Hermenegild Joseph | 15.02.1950 | 1953 |
| Bro.Anselm Calixtus | 02.05.1953 | 1953 |
| Bro.lawrence Justinian | 26.06.1953 | 1955 |
| Bro.Glastian Oliver | 29.06.1953 | 1958 |
| Bro.Hugh Faringdon | 01.01.1959 | 1959 |
| Bro.lewis of Jesus | 01.01.1960 | 1965 |
(The school was handed over to Govt. on 08.10.1962)
| Bro.Thomas Alphonsus | 04.01.1966 | 1968 |
| Bro.Edwin Ambrose | 01.06.1969 | 1979 |
| Bro.George de Silva | 15.09.1979 | 1986 |
| Bro.Aloysius Stephen | 20.10.1986 | 1992 |
| Bro.Placidus Fernando | 15.01.1992 | 01.10.1995 |
| Bro.Sadalal Alwis | 2011 | 2016 |
| Fr.Benate Shantha | 2016 | 2017 |
| Mr.Munasingha Parakrama | 2017 | 2021 |
| Fr.Janaka Nishantha | 2021 | |

== Diamond jubilee ==
Celebration of 75 years since its inception was celebrated on September 17, 2008. The college was founded and formed under the mantle of De La Salle Christian Brothers on 17 September 1933. St. Mary’s College began with a group of three Christian Brothers of the Order of De La Salle.

Valence Mendis, Bishop of Chilaw and Frank Marcus Fernando, Bishop Emeritus were co-celebrants of Holy Mass at Our Lady of Mount Carmel Cathedral, Chilaw on 17 September, followed by a procession to the venue at St. Mary’s College where a meeting was held with the guests, students, parents and well-wishers.
