= Visangamanaya =

- Sinhala: විසංගමනය
- Directed by: Ranjan Prasanna
- Written by: Upali Gamlath
- Produced by: Cinem Entertainments
- Starring: Ashan Dias; Samanalee Fonseka; Semini Iddamalgoda
- Cinematography: Thisula Thambavita
- Edited by: Praveen Jayaratne
- Music by: Samantha Perera
- Distributed by: MPI Theatres
- Release date: 7 July 2023
- Country: Sri Lanka
- Language: Sinhala

Visangamanaya (Isolation) (Sinhala: විසංගමනය) is a 2023 Sri Lankan Sinhala drama film directed by Ranjan Prasanna and produced by Mahesh Wijeratne for Sinem Entertainments. It stars Ashan Dias and Semini Iddamalgoda in lead roles along with Samanalee Fonseka and Udith Abeyratne. Music composed by Samantha Perera.

== Cast ==
- Ashan Dias as Jagath Dissanayake
- Semini Iddamalgoda as Rukshani
- Samanalee Fonseka as Esha
- Udith Abeyratne
- Douglas Ranasinghe as Dissanayake principal, Jagath's father
- Hyacinth Wijeratne as Jagath's mother
- Elroy Amalathas as Doctor Sharma
- Niroshan Wijesinghe
- Chinthaka Kulatunga
- Charith Abeysinghe
- Ishan Mendis
- Gamini Jayalath
- Bandula Suriyabandara
- Sujeewa Karunaratne.

== Awards ==
The film brings maiden cinematic direction of Ranjan Prasanna. The film won the second place at director's maiden film category at London's Lift-Off Film Festival. It was also selected for the final round of Tokyo Lift-Off Film Festival. In 2021, it won the Director's Debut film Award at the Stockholm City Film Festival in Sweden and then won the Best Film at the Port Blair Awards in India.
