= Ralla Weralata Adarei =

Ralla Weralata Adarei (Sinhala: රැල්ල වෙරළට ආදරෙයි is a 2017 Sinhalese Sri Lankan television prime-time soap opera which premiered on 2021 on Hiru TV. The series is directed and produced by Nivantha Parasara and Kasun Tharindra. It airs every weekday.

== Plot ==
Ralla Weralata Adarei (Love Beyond the Waves) is a Sri Lankan romance drama that explores themes of love, sacrifice, and destiny against the backdrop of the ocean.

The story follows Sandeep, a young fisherman who dreams of a better life beyond the small coastal village where he was born. One fateful day, he rescues Nethmi, a wealthy girl who nearly drowns while vacationing with her family. Despite their different backgrounds, the two develop a deep bond that blossoms into love.

However, their love faces many obstacles. Nethmi's parents strongly oppose the relationship, arranging her engagement to a businessman, Roshan, who can provide her with a stable and luxurious life. Meanwhile, Sandeep struggles with his own insecurities, wondering if he will ever be good enough for Nethmi.

Determined to prove himself, Sandeep takes on a dangerous deep-sea fishing expedition, hoping to earn enough money to change his fate. As the stormy sea tests his resilience, Nethmi must also decide between following her heart or succumbing to her family's wishes.

== Cast ==
- Bimal Jayakodi / Gayan Wicramathilaka as Weerawardana
- Mahendra Perera as Shiwa Father
- Randika Gunathilaka as Shiwa
- Amanda Jayarathna as Sathya
- Nihal Fernando as Sathya Grand Father
- Kokila Jayasuriya as Bhabu
- Chamila Piris as Sathya Mother
- Tharindi Fernando
- Chathura Rajapakse as Jude
- Darshan Dharmaraj
- Kumara Thirimadura
- Jayani Senanayake as Weerawardana Sister / Jude Mother
- Sarath Chandrasiri / Ananda Athukorala as Bus Driver
- Nimal Pallewaththe
- Meena Kumari
- Menaka Rajapakse / Wishwa Kodikara as Police Inspector
- Sanath Gunathilake as Cameo appearance
- Nilmini Tennakoon as Cameo appearance
- Kusal Maduranga as Samare
- Nirosha Thalagala
- Dasuni Senethma
- Praveena Dissanayaka
- Richard Manamudali
- Kamal Deshapriya as Cameo appearance
- Anjalee Liyanage
- Dharmapriya Dias
- Niroshan Wijesighe as Minister
- Ferni Roshini

== See also ==
- Hiru TV
