= Charith Abeysinghe =

Sri Lankan actor, director and politician

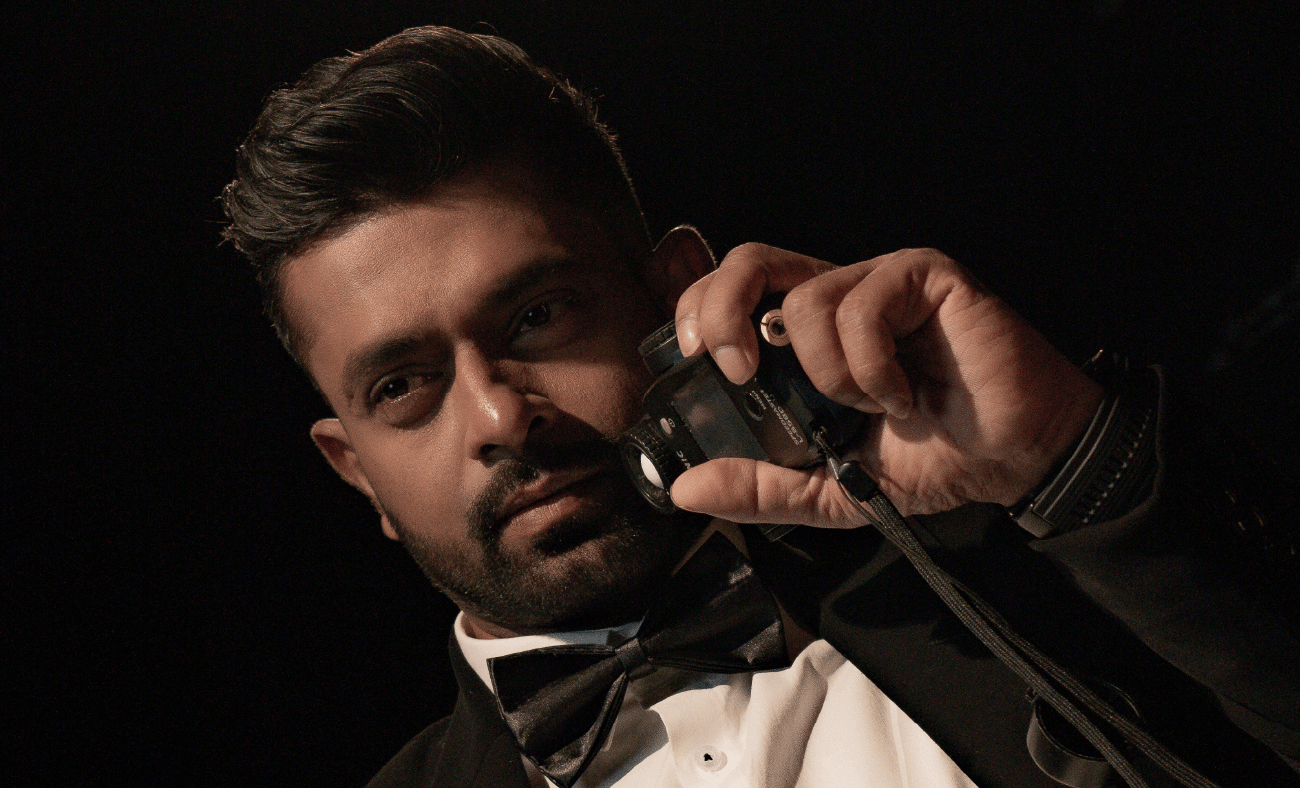
- Born: November 27, 1982 (age 43); Horana, Sri Lanka
- Political party: Samagi Jana Balawegaya
- Other political affiliations: Samagi Jana Balawegaya
- Spouse(s): Puvaneswary Sundarampillai (M 2004 - 2014), Satharasinghe Arachchie Hanson Sithara (M 2015)
- Children: Ashok Abeysinghe, Aveesha Abeysinghe, Thedeesha Abeysinghe, and Meleesha Abeysinghe
- Awards: Best Director & cinematographer - Thadee (2023 Signis awards)
- Website: charithabeysinghe.com

Abeysinghe Charith Wasantha Kumara (born November 27, 1982, in Horana, Sri Lanka; Sinhala: චරිත් අබේසිංහ), commonly known as Charith Abeysinghe, is a Sri Lankan tele-cinema director, producer, cinematographer, singer, actor, and television presenter. With a career spanning over 25 years, Abeysinghe has been involved in various roles within the Sri Lankan arts and entertainment sector, including television and film.

== Personal life ==
Abeysinghe was married to Puvaneswary Sundarampillai, with whom he has a son named Ashok (21 years old).

Abeysinghe then married Satharasinghe Archie Hanson Sithara, and they have three daughters: Aveesha, Thedeesha, and Meleesha.

== Acting career ==
Abeysinghe began his career in the Sri Lankan entertainment industry, participating in music, television, and film. In 2007, he produced Juliya, recognized as one of the early Sri Lankan films shot entirely in High Definition and among the most expensive productions in the country at that time. The film was completed at Pinewood Studios in London, marking a significant technical advancement for Sri Lankan cinema.

In addition to his work in film, Abeysinghe has been involved in numerous television dramas, including Wassanaye Hiru Avidin (2001), Sonduru Kadalla (2014), Chakra (2014), Prana (2016), Gemunu Maharaja (2017), Yan (2019), Kumi (2019), Sathya (2020), Thadee (2021), Number 09 (2022), Chandi Kumarihami (2023), Bambarek Awith.(2024), Take Care (2023), and Meemassa (2024) His 2018 teledrama Mini Gandala saw him take on roles as both director and actor.

=== Selected television series ===
- Amma (2025)
- Bambarek Awith (2024)
- Chakra (2014)
- Chandi Kumarihami (2023)
- Gamunu Maharaja (2016–2017)
- Kumi (2019)
- Meemassa (2024)
- Minigandela (2018)
- Number 09
- Prana (2016)
- Sathya (2020)
- Take Care (2024)
- Thadee (2021)
- Yan (2019)

=== Political career ===
Post-release from his time served in London for a money-laundering charge, Abeysinghe returned to Sri Lanka to pursue acting and political power. In 2024, he was nominated as a candidate for the Sri Lankan Parliament from the Colombo District, representing the Samagi Jana Balawegaya (SJB). In 2026 Abeysinghe was appointed as a member of working committee of the Samagi Jana Balawegaya. On June 25, 2026, Abeysinghe was arrested by Bribery Commission of Sri Lanka for allegations of bribery and connections with organized criminal figures. Following which, his SJB membership was suspended by the party.

== Filmography ==
Key
†	Denotes films that have not yet been released

Year	Film	Role	Ref.
2009	Juliya	Dilru	
2016	July 7	Robbin	
2018	Sarungal	Milinda	
2021	Ginimal Pokuru	Lasith	
2023	Kadira Divyaraja	King Dutugemunu	
2023	Visangamanaya		
TBA	Mr and Mrs †		
TBA	Ima †		

=== Awards ===
Sumathi Awards

Year	Nominee / work	Award	Result
2018	Minigandela	Best Teledrama Art Director	Won
2019	Sansararanyaasabada" ,"Thadi", "Sathya"	Special Jury Award	won

Signis Awards

Year	Nominee/work	Award	Result
2023	Thaadi	Best Director & Cinemetographer	Won
