= Frank Marcus Fernando =

Sri Lankan bishop (1931-2009)

Frank Marcus Fernando (Sinhala: ෆ්‍රෑන්ක් මාකස් ප්‍රනාන්දු) (October 19, 1931 – August 24, 2009) was the Sri Lankan bishop of the Roman Catholic Diocese of Chilaw in Sri Lanka. Fernando served as the Bishop of Chilaw from his appointment on December 27, 1972, until his retirement on October 19, 2006. The diocese is based in Chilaw, a coastal city north of Colombo. Frank Marcus Fernando was born in 1931. He was officially ordained a Catholic priest in Rome, Italy.

== Bishop of Chilaw ==
Fernando was first ordained as a bishop on August 19, 1965. He was further appointed the coadjutor bishop of Chilaw in 1968. Fernando served as the president of the Catholic Bishops' Conference of Sri Lanka. He succeeded Edmund Peiris as the Bishop of Chilaw on December 27, 1972 and remained in the post until his retirement on October 19, 2006.

He became a writer and human rights activist for a number of Catholic and Sri Lankan causes as bishop. Fernando campaigned strongly against a proposed law that would limit religious conversions in Sri Lanka. He also fought against the construction of a coal-fired power plant which many feared would pollute both the environment as well as a Catholic shrine located in the Diocese of Chilaw. Fernando organized rallies and prayer services against the deteriorating human rights, justice, and environmental policies in the country.

Bishop Frank Marcus Fernando died on August 24, 2009, at the age of 77 at a private hospital in Marawila. His requiem mass was held at the home of the Archbishop of Colombo on August 25. His funeral mass was held at the Our Lady of Mount Carmel Cathedral in Chilaw.
