= Gamya Wijayadasa =

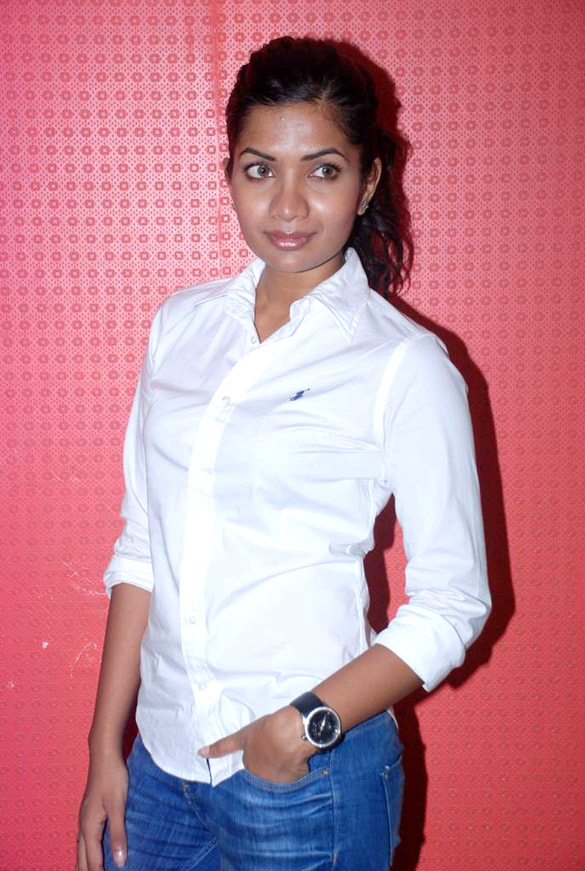
- Gamya at Cast of 'Aalaap' interview
- Born: Gamya Prasadini Vaidurya Wijayadasa; 30 June 1986 (age 39); Colombo, Sri Lanka
- Occupation: Actress
- Years active: 2009–present
- Height: 5 ft 6 in (168 cm)

Gamya Wijayadasa (Sinhala:ගම්‍යා විජයදාස) is a Sri Lankan actress and beauty pageant titleholder who won Derana Veet Miss Sri Lanka 2009 and represented Sri Lanka in Miss World 2009 on December 12, 2009 in Johannesburg, South Africa.

== Early life ==
Wijayadasa studied up to grade 6 at Musaeus College in Colombo before leaving to Singapore and then studying at the Marsiling College, Wijayadasa also studied at Strathmore Secondary College in Australia before going on to study Psychology for her Bachelor's degree.

== Career ==
Wijayadasa was named Miss Sri Lanka 2009 on Wednesday July 22, 2009 beating 11 beauty queens at Mount Lavinia Hotel in Sri Lanka. She also won mini-titles like Miss Veet Beautiful Legs, Miss Personality and Miss Veet Beautiful Skin at the Derana Veet Miss Sri Lanka 2009 beauty pageant.

2009 October Wijayadasa was appointed as the United Nations Good will ambassordor for Sri Lanka as a recognition of her 10 years of community service for her country. Wijayadasa is also working as representative of " Tharunyata Hetak " - National Youth Organisation.

Wijayadasa focus on rehabilitation process, welfare of Internally Displaced People in the North of Sri Lanka and Youth education.

In 2012 Wijayadasa met the producers including Manish Manikpuri of Aalaap Bollywood movie and she was selected for an Item number for the movie.

== Social work ==
Wijayadasa began volunteering at the age of 13. She started as a volunteer journalist and ventured into many avenues of social service where she contributed to major community projects before the title of Miss Sri Lanka was bestowed upon her.

== Filmography ==
Key
†	Denotes film or TV productions that have not yet been released

Year	Film	Role	Ref.
2012	Aalaap	Item song 'Chadhti Jawaani'	
2019	U Turn	Maya	
2024	1970 Love Story		
