= Avilenasului =

2020 Sri Lankan road thriller film

- Film poster
- Sinhala: ඇවිලෙනසුලුයි
- Directed by: Chinthana Dharmadasa
- Written by: Chinthana Dharmadasa
- Produced by: Anura Silva
- Starring: Shyam Fernando; Samanalee Fonseka; Hemasiri Liyanage
- Cinematography: Palitha Perera
- Edited by: Saman Alvitigala
- Music by: Indrachapa Liyanage
- Production company: Ashram Films
- Distributed by: EAP Theaters
- Release date: 13 March 2020
- Running time: 80 minutes
- Country: Sri Lanka
- Language: Sinhala

Avilenasului (Sinhala: ඇවිලෙනසුලුයි, lit. 'Inflammable') is a 2020 Sri Lankan Sinhala road thriller film directed by Chinthana Dharmadasa and produced by Anura Silva for Ashram Films. It stars Shyam Fernando and Samanalee Fonseka in lead roles along with Hemasiri Liyanage and Kumara Thirimadura. Music composed by Indrachapa Liyanage as his debut cinema composing. It is the first road thriller film in Sri Lanka.

Director Chinthana Dharmadasa won the Most Promising Director award at the Derana Film Awards in 2018 for the film. However, film received mixed reviews from critics.

The screening of the film was halted after few days due to the COVID-19 pandemic in Sri Lanka.

== Cast ==
- Shyam Fernando as Kamal Senadilankara
- Samanalee Fonseka as woman with knife
- Hemasiri Liyanage
- Priyantha Sirikumara
- Kumara Thirimadura
- Nishantha Priyadarshana
- Ranjith Devanarayana
- Indunil Suranga
