= July 7 (film) =

2016 Sri Lankan film directed by Sanjay Nirmal

- Sinhala: ජූලි 07 යි
- Directed by: Sanjaya Nirmal
- Written by: Hemantha Prasad
- Based on: Miniplay of Don't Dress for Dinner by Marc Camoletti (playwright)
- Produced by: Head Master Films
- Starring: Anarkali Akarsha; Saranga Disasekara; Charith Abeysinghe
- Cinematography: Upul Prajath
- Edited by: Shan Alwis
- Music by: Nuwan Thenuwara
- Release date: 7 April 2016
- Country: Sri Lanka
- Language: Sinhala

July 7 (Sinhala: ජූලි 07 යි) is a 2016 Sri Lankan Sinhala comedy black-n-white film in the 2010, directed by Sanjaya Nirmal and produced by Charith Abeysinghe for Head Master Films. The film based on a miniplay of Don't Dress for Dinner by French Marc Camoletti (playwright). It stars Anarkali Akarsha and Saranga Disasekara in lead roles along with and Charith Abeysinghe and Damitha Abeyratne. Music composed by Nuwan Thenuwara. It is the 1248th Sri Lankan film in the Sinhala cinema.

== Cast ==
The characters are from their real life names.

- Anarkali Akarsha as Susina
- Saranga Disasekara as Tom
- Charith Abeysinghe as Robbin
- Damitha Abeyratne as Susima
- Pubudu Chathuranga as Kalu Malli
- Oshadi Hewamadduda as Loren

== Soundtrack ==
No.	Title	Lyrics	Singer(s)	Length
1.	"Ranga Paana Dadabbara Kello"	Kasun Mahendra	Charith Abeysinghe
