= How I Wonder What You Are =

- Theatrical Poster
- Directed by: Udaya Dharmawardhana; Chinthana Dharmadasa
- Written by: Udaya Dharmawardhana; Chinthana Dharmadasa
- Produced by: Magic Lantern; Endless World; D Mix
- Starring: Prasanna Mahagamage; Purnima Muhandiram
- Cinematography: Chinthaka Somakeerthi; Udaya Dharmawardhana
- Edited by: Duminda De Silva
- Music by: Jayanth Dharmawardhana
- Release date: April 30, 2010
- Running time: 74 minutes
- Country: Sri Lanka
- Language: Sinhala
- Budget: $3000

How I Wonder What You Are is a 2010 drama film directed by Udaya Dharmawardhana and Chinthana Dharmadasa. The film is a low budget production and is claimed to be from the first independent cinema in Sri Lanka.

== Plot ==
The plot is a story of two youths who are engaged on a soul searching mission. D (played by Prasanna Mahaganage) is a youth of 29 who is frustrated with life not having a reason to live. He yearns for some form of connection, when Kathy (played by Purnima Mohandiram) visits him. She comes to D after a little crash with her partner KK (played by Namal Jayasinghe). Kathy is waiting for a call from her boyfriend to confirm that he still needs her, but the call never comes. D and Kathy spend a day waiting, yet nothing happens. D and Kathy make desperate attempts to reveal their emotions to each other, but they soon realize that they have forgotten the language of connectivity. However, D began to create dreams around her. Unable to face the trauma of nothingness and emptiness, Kathy leaves, leaving D behind in a state more heartbroken than before and waiting for her to return.

== Cast ==
- Prasanna Mahagamage as "D"
- Purnima Muhandiram as Kathy
- Namal Jayasinghe as "KK"
- Mahendra Perera
- Dayadeva Edirisinghe
- Sirimal Wijesinghe

== Production ==
The movie was shot in numerous locations in Colombo, Sri Lanka. The directors raised their budget with the collaboration of colleagues. Several cast and crew members worked without pay.

== Music ==
The original score was composed by Jayanth Dharmawardhana. The theme song of the movie "Adare Anshu Mathrayak" (Descending from Paradise) is performed by Indrachapa Liyanage and written by Asoka Handagama.

== Release ==
The film was officially premiered at the National Film Corporation theater on April 30, 2010, for a selected audience. Producers claim that they are going to use alternative methods for public screening.
