= Ashan Dias =

Sri Lankan actor and presenter

- Born: 31 May 1981 (age 45); Negombo, Sri Lanka
- Education: Maris Stella College
- Occupations: Actor, TV host
- Years active: 2008–present

Ashan Dias (Sinhala: අෂාන් ඩයස්; born 31 May 1981) is an actor in Sri Lankan cinema. Started as a newscaster in MBC Networks, Dias became a character actor with several critically acclaimed roles in films including Alimankada, Sarigama and Vijayaba Kollaya.

He hosted two seasons of the television reality show Thathvika on TV Derana.

== Personal life ==
He was born on 31 May 1981 to a Roman Catholic family. He studied at Maris Stella College, Negombo. He completed A/L education from mathematics stream. He has two brothers.

== Career ==
After A/Ls, he worked with an architect friend for six months. While studying at the Institute of Architecture, he started to work part time as a reporter in MTV/MBC network. He started as a reporter for MTV, doing coverage, news writing and editing. After five months as a news reporter, Dias got into news reading for Yes FM and then later for MTV. He worked in News reading for Yes FM on Tuesday evenings and for MTV on Monday and Friday nights.

During the time as a TV presenter, Dias started backstage in a couple of Workshop Players' plays. He also acted as a "hyena" in theater play Lion King. His maiden cinematic experience came through 2008 film Alimankada directed by Chandran Rutnam. His role as "Captain Wasantha Ratnayake" was highly praised by the critics. In 2016, he acted in the film Siri Parakum. For his role as "Pathiraja Senevi", he won the Hiru Golden Film award for the Best Supporting actor.

In 2019, he co-hosted the Derana Lux Film Festival with fellow actor Jagath Manuwarna. In 2020, he hosted the adventure cookery program Cookout on TV Derana. In 2020, he acted in the Sci-Fi horror film Vikaari directed by Sandun Seneviratne and British Filmmaker Charlie Bray.

As a television presenter, he is currently hosting the cookery program Derana "Cook-Out" and entertainment program Sirasa "Five Million Money Drop – season III".

== Filmography ==
Key
†	Denotes films that have not yet been released

Year	Film	Role	Ref.
2008	Alimankada	Captain Wasantha Ratnayake	
2013	Death Watch	Akthul Majood	
2013	A Common Man		
2013	Siri Parakum	Pathiraja Senevi	
2016	Sarigama	Captain Tony	
2019	Vijayaba Kollaya	Asanga	
2019	President Super Star	Mad president	
2019	Gaadi		
2020	Suparna	Indrajith	
2020	Ekthara Adara Kathawak		
2022	Three Way Junction		
2023	Visangamanaya	Jagath Dissanayake	
2023	Vedi Nowadina Lamai		
2024	1970 Love Story	Reginald Dunusinghe	
2024	Sihina Sameekarana	Janaka Sir	
2025	Rani	Mangala Samaraweera	
2025	Walampoori	Angelo	
2025	Aayu	Ravi	
2025	Maria	Dayya	
2026	Dharmayuddhaya 2	D.I.G Vishwa	
TBA	Vikaari †		
TBA	A Promise Carved in Flesh †	Brodie	
TBA	Dharmayuddhaya 03 †	D.I.G. Vishwa	
