= Sihina Nelum Mal =

2024 Sri Lankan romantic drama film directed by Shameera Rangana Naotunna

- Sinhala: සිහින නෙළුම් මල්
- Directed by: Shameera Rangana Naotunna
- Written by: Shameera Rangana Naotunna
- Produced by: Waruna Arambage
- Starring: Hemal Ranasinghe; Dusheni Miyurangi; Umali Thilakarathne
- Cinematography: Vishwajith Karunaratne
- Edited by: Ravindra Guruge
- Music by: Milinda Thennakoon
- Production company: Cinelli Media
- Release date: 23 August 2024
- Country: Sri Lanka
- Language: Sinhala

Sihina Nelum Mal (Sinhala: සිහින නෙළුම් මල්) is a 2024 Sri Lankan Sinhala-language romantic drama film written and directed by Shameera Rangana Naotunna and produced by Waruna Arambage from Cinelli Media. The film stars Hemal Ranasinghe, Dusheni Miyurangi and Umali Thilakarathne in the pivotal roles. The film has its theatrical release across various theatres in Sri Lanka on 23 August 2024. The film title Sihina Nelum Mal was inspired and taken from yesteryear veteran lyricist Ajantha Ranasinghe's song which was also composed with the same title of the name.

== Synopsis ==
The film is based on the life trajectory of a happily married young couple named Sahan and Nayomi, who live in an apartment. However, things take a backseat for them when they face growing societal pressure without bearing a child despite being in marriage for more than six years.

== Cast ==
- Hemal Ranasinghe as Sahan
- Dusheni Miyurangi as Nayomi
- Umali Thilakarathne as Kumari
- Sriyani Amarasena as Sahan's mother
- Veena Jayakody as Sahan's aunt
- Priyantha Seneviratne as Saman
- Lal Kularatne as Lal
- Kalana Gunasekara as Alvis
- Mayura Kanchana as Asanka
- Dayadeva Edirisinghe as Sahan's father

== Production ==
This is the second cinema direction by Shameera Rangana Naotunna, who previously made the critically acclaimed award winning 2016 film Motor Bicycle. Vishwajith Karunaratne is the cinematographer and Ravindra Guruge is the editor. Art direction done by Dhammika Hevaduwatta, makeup by Buwaneka Ranawaka, whereas sound administration by Aruna Priyantha Kaluarachchi and Madhavi Dasanayake with the costumes. Ronith Adhikari is the main production manager.

The film consists with three songs: Oba Mage by Mihindu Ariyaratne with Sashika Nisansala; Maa Hade Ron Pibidunu by Anushka Kulatunga and Rosa Kusuma by Amila Perera.

== Release ==
The Muhurath ceremony was held in April 2023 at the Cinnamon Grand Colombo. However, the film was officially released on 23 August 2024 in 60 cinemas throughout the country. The film successfully passed 50 days, and 100 days in cinemas.
