= Vijayaba Kollaya (film) =

2019 film directed by Sunil Ariyarathne

- Sinhala: විජයබා කොල්ලය
- Literally: Sack of Vijayabāhu
- Directed by: Sunil Ariyaratne
- Written by: Tissa Abeysekara
- Based on: Vijayabā Kollaya by W. A. Silva
- Produced by: H. D. Premasiri
- Starring: Hemal Ranasinghe; Senali Fonseka; Ashan Dias
- Cinematography: Channa Deshapriya
- Edited by: Boodee Keerthisena
- Music by: Rohana Weerasinghe
- Production company: Sarasavi Cineru
- Distributed by: EAP Circuit
- Release date: 1 August 2019
- Running time: 130 minutes
- Country: Sri Lanka
- Language: Sinhala
- Budget: Rs. 75 million

Vijayaba Kollaya (Sinhala: විජයබා කොල්ලය, lit. 'Sack of Vijayabahu') is a 2019 Sinhalese historical drama directed by Sunil Ariyaratne. The film stars Hemal Ranasinghe, Senali Fonseka and Ashan Dias in lead roles. Rohana Weerasinghe composed the film's soundtrack. The film's screenplay was written by Tissa Abeysekara, the last before his death. The story is based on W. A. Silva's 1938 novel Vijayaba Kollaya on the historical event of the same name. The Vijayabā Kollaya was a succession dispute in 1521 that led to the division of the Kingdom of Kotte and eventually its downfall. The love triangle of Nayanananda, Neelamani and Asanga. In theatres both 2D and 3D.

== Plot ==
In 1505, Lourenço de Almeida, a Portuguese naval ship, landed in Sri Lanka mistakenly due to a storm during a voyage. The story dated to the legends about King Vijayabahu VII of Kotte and his sons Bhuvanaikabahu VII of Kotte, Mayadunne of Sitawaka and Raigama Bandara princes who succeeded King Parakramabahu IX of Kotte. Neelamani is the daughter of the King's army leader, where one of his warriors, Asanga falls in love with Neelamani. However, Nilamani had captured the heart of Nayanananda, a young man from the upcountry who worked as a spy. After betrayal, king's men were after Nayanananda and he hide in army leader's stable. Meanwhile, three sons plan to ascend the throne by killing their father. With several incidents in line, Asanga expressed his love for Neelamni, who refused it due to Nayanananda. Both Nayananada and Asanga went for a war and Asanga promised Neelamani that he will protect Nayanananda. However, Nayanananda is captured during the fight and Neelamani scolds Asanga. Asanga goes to the Portuguese camp where he persuades Nayanananda to escape and Asanga takes his place. He eventually escapes with another girl who happens to be a daughter of an old friend. He returns to Nayanananda and Neelamani who pleads Asanga's forgiveness for her stupidity. Soon after mortally wounded Asanga succumbs to his injuries and passes away

== Cast ==
- Hemal Ranasinghe as Nayananada
- Senali Fonseka as Neelamani
- Ashan Dias as Asanga
- Preethi Randeniya as Vindunatha
- Buddhika Jayaratne as Kandure Bandara
- Erdley Wedamuni as Nayaka Senevi
- Chulakshi Ranathunga as Hamidumma
- Ariyaratne Kalurachchi as Vijayabahu VI
- Hans Billmoria as Lasarda
- Ryan van Rooyen
- Gavin Ludwyk
- Gayana Sudarshani as Devaki
- Yash Weerasinghe as Mayadunne

== Production ==
Following the successful Sunil Ariyaratne's Paththini in 2016, starring Pooja Umashankar and after completing post production Bimba Devi Alias Yashodhara in 2018, starring Pallavi Subhash, Ariyaratne was announced his next project Vijayaba Kollaya as a film present for celebrating 71st anniversary of Sinhalese Cinema. With cooperation executive film producer Boodee Keerthisena. This was based on Sinhala literature W. A. Silva's novel of the same name. On 21 January 2018, day of Sinhalese Cinema 71st year celebration, Boodee Keerthisena and Sunil Ariyarathne was announced they're next project present to Sinhalese cinema. The muhurath ceremony was held Mathura Restaurant at Bambalapitiya . Boodee producing under the production house Buddhi Films announced that they would produce a film starring Hemal Ranasinghe to be directed by Sunil Ariyarathne.

== Songs ==
The film consists with two songs.

No.	Title	Lyrics	Singer(s)	Length
1.	"Ahipillamak Athara"	Sunil Ariyaratne	Umaria Sinhawansa
2.	"Singali None"	Sunil Ariyaratne	Sanuka Wickramasinghe
