= Hero Nero =

- Sinhala: හීරෝ නීරෝ
- Directed by: Pradeep Mahesh Liyanage
- Written by: Pradeep Mahesh Liyanage; Nishantha Pradeep Mohottige
- Produced by: Screen Works Films
- Starring: Mahinda Pathirage; Duleeka Marapana; Nilmini Tennakoon
- Cinematography: Wimarshana Rathnayaka
- Edited by: Chamara Horagolla
- Music by: Shameel J
- Distributed by: CEL Theatres
- Release date: 11 November 2016
- Country: Sri Lanka
- Language: Sinhala

Hero Nero (Sinhala: හීරෝ නීරෝ) is a 2016 Sri Lankan Sinhala children's adventure film directed by Pradeep Mahesh Liyanage and produced by Nishantha Pradeep Mohottige for Screen Works Films. It stars Mahinda Pathirage, Duleeka Marapana, and Nilmini Tennakoon in lead roles along with Sangeetha Weeraratne and Niroshan Wijesinghe. Music composed by Shameel J. It is the 1263rd Sri Lankan film in the Sinhalese cinema. The film was influenced by the 2011 Bollywood film Chillar Party, which is about saving pets.

== Cast ==
- Duleeka Marapana as Mrs. Lionel
- Mahinda Pathirage as Minister Lionel
- Nilmini Tennakoon as Priya Senarathne
- Sangeetha Weeraratne as himself
- Otara Gunewardene in cameo appearance
- Niroshan Wijesinghe as Mr. Senarathne
- Anjalee Liyanage
- Lakshika Fonseka as Veterinary surgeon
- D.B. Gangodathenna
- Pavith Thanura as Ravindu
- Chanaka Madushan as Dunstan
- Malidu Thiwanka as Little monk
- Nihindu Omal as Gadget
- Sonal Stephan as Seek
- Poshini Nadee as Karate
- Rohan Aravinda as Innocent
- Mamoj Wickramasinghe as Kachal
- Thilina Lakshan as Negative
- Ranjan Ramanayake in special appearance
- Roy de Silva in special appearance
- Niro the dog

== Soundtrack ==
No.	Title	Lyrics	Singer(s)	Length
1.	"Ahaganna Daas Ayagena"	Anjana Yasiru	Kaveesha Wijesooriya
