= K. M. Rathnapala =

Sri Lankan music teacher (born 1965)

K. M. Rathnapala (Sinhala: කේ.එම්. රත්නපාල) (born 26 March 1965), is a Sri Lankan music teacher, multi-instrumentalist, educationalist and a pioneer in national school talent management.

== Career ==
=== Early years ===
Rathnapala started his teaching career in 1990 when he was appointed the first music teacher in Ihalagama Gemunu Vidyalaya. Then he was transferred to his childhood school Thelahera Maha Vidyalaya as music teacher in 1994. During this time, Rathnapala who personally approached the Ministry of Education succeeded to amass school's first ever musical instruments to create its first band and choir. He also taught music to other school children in the area during the evenings, free of charge.

=== Ananda College ===
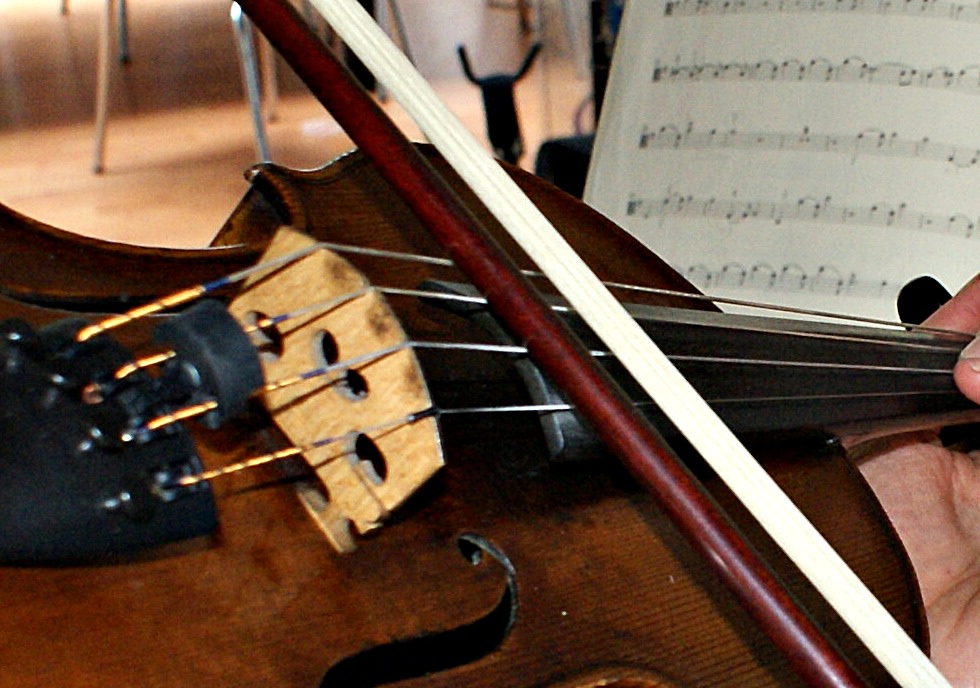
Rathnapala mastered the violin.

In 1998, Rathnapala's career took a new dimension when he was transferred to Colombo upon request of Gunadasa Kapuge and appointed as junior music teacher of Ananda College under principal T. B. Damunupola and senior music teacher Walter Perera. An oriental singer and a violin virtuoso by now, he quickly rose to prominence as both the head of music and teacher-in-charge of the 'Ananda College Music Circle' and the 'Ananda College Senior Brass Band' and encouraged students to organize mega-scale annual musical concerts such as 'Rhythm of the Maroons' and 'Prashasthi' for multiple years. He was known not only for teaching his assigned students who studied music as a subject, but also for guiding students from other academic streams who wished to learn music from him. Being a student centered disciplinarian and due to his lively and optimistic demeanor, Rathnapala was additionally entrusted as the teacher-in-charge of 'Ananda College Drug Prevention Association' and 'Ananda College Radio Club', making him the first and only teacher-in-charge of four clubs and societies in school's history. Rathnapala was renowned for his Laissez-faire leadership style which emphasized on delegation and minimal supervision, which led his students to be independent and thorough with their decision making.

On 13 November 2009, he was bestowed with the title Maestro by the Music Circle board of officials 2009/10, under the patronage of the Ananda College Old Boys Association. In 2021, after twenty three years of service in Ananda College, Rathnapala was transferred to Ananda Sastralaya, Kotte to continue his visionary teaching. In a career which spanned three and a half decades, Rathnapala taught and mentored more than twenty five thousand students.

=== In popular media ===
In 2024, Rathnapala released the official music video of his magnum opus Sahas Wew, a patriotic song which he composed and sang while he was junior music teacher of Ananda College. His student Kasun Kalhara made a tribute by dedicating the song Sithija Rekha from his 2005 album Radical Premaya to Rathnapala.

In 2025, Rathnapala obtained his Master of Music from the University of Kelaniya, and initiated 'Rathsara' school of music.
