= Edmund Peiris (bishop) =

Catholic bishop in Sri Lanka (1897–1989)

The Right Reverend Edmund Pieris (Sinhala: එඩ්මන්ඩ් පීරිස්), O.M.I. (27 December 1897 – 4 September 1989) was a Roman Catholic Bishop of Chilaw, Ceylon (now Sri Lanka).

He was born in Chilaw, the son of Mihindukulasuriya Manuel Diogu Pieris and Weerasinghage Clara Peiris and educated at St. Joseph's College, Colombo. He entered St. Bernard's Seminary in Borella, Colombo to study for the priesthood and was ordained in 1924, after which he graduated in Oriental Studies at the University of London.

In 1939 he was consecrated as the Bishop of Chilaw to follow Bishop-elect Louis Perera, who had been appointed as the first bishop but died before he could be consecrated. He introduced Sinhalese culture into the ritual and built many churches and chapels in rural areas. He resigned the episcopy in 1972 to become Bishop Emeritus.

He also served on several government boards and committees and was President of the Ceylon Branch of the Royal Asiatic Society from 1959 to 1961.

After his death in 1989 Chilaw council erected a life size statue to his memory at the entrance to Bridge Street.
