= Nalin Perera (singer) =

Sri Lankan singer

- නලින් පෙරේරා
- Born: Mahabaduge Nalin Anjelo Perera; 15 October 1969 (age 56); Chilaw, Sri Lanka
- Education: St. Mary's College, Chilaw
- Occupations: Singer, songwriter
- Spouse: Nilmini Perera
- Children: Swetha Perera, Nikhil Perera

Nalin Perera (born 15 October 1969) is a Sri Lankan singer, songwriter, and composer. A popular musician, he founded the band Marians in 1988 which has become one of popular bands in Sri Lanka.

Mahabaduge Nalin Anjelo Perera was born on 15 October 1969 in Chilaw to Christopher Perera and Miriam Perera, he was the eldest of five siblings. Perera was educated at St. Mary's College, Chilaw. Inspired by Sunil Perera, young Nalin joined the group Nightingales as a vocalist in 1985. In 1988, Nalin became the head prefect of his school and with the help of the school principal Rev. Bro. Alosious, he formed the band with his school friends and named it "Marians". The first concert of the Marians was held on 11 February 1988 at Sudasuna auditorium. In the 1990s he began collaborating with other local bands such as the Gypsies and Sunflowers and Marians became popular. Nalin also hosted the Kageda Gee Nada on Sirasa TV from 1997 to 2008 and starred in the Sinhala movie Eka Malaka Pethi directed by Mohan Niyaz as the lead role.

Nalin is married to Nilmini Perera and they have two children.
