= 1970 Love Story =

- Film poster
- Directed by: Aruna Jayawardane
- Based on: Visakesa Chandrasekaram
- Produced by: Saman Edirisinghe
- Starring: Hemal Ranasinghe; Mahendra Perera; Gamya Wijayadasa
- Cinematography: Channa Deshapriya
- Edited by: Tissa Surendra
- Music by: Chinthaka Jayakody
- Release date: 9 February 2024
- Country: Sri Lanka
- Language: Sinhala

1970 Love Story is a 2024 Sri Lankan Sinhalese romantic thriller film directed by Aruna Jayawardane and produced by Saman Edirisinghe for Star Entertainments and Events. It stars Hemal Ranasinghe and Gamya Wijayadasa in lead roles along with Mahendra Perera, Bimal Jayakody and Sarath Kothalawala in supportive roles.

The film is based on the real events of an incident in 1970. The film received positive reviews from critics, who praised the plot, locations and acting.

== Cast ==
- Hemal Ranasinghe as Raveen, the main actor
- Gamya Wijayadasa as Rosy, the main actress
- Mahendra Perera as Mahendra, the film director
- Ashan Dias as Derric, the villain
- Bimal Jayakody as Clifford Dunuwila, Sherin's husband
- Dineth De Silva as Reginald Dunusinghe, the main villain
- Sarath Kothalawala as Saraa, the assistant cook
- Sandani Fernando as Sherin Norton Dunuwila, the ghost
- Suneth Malsiripura as Rosy's servant
- Nandana Hettiarachchi as Assistant cook
- Asanga Perera as Asanga
- Daya Wayaman as Subramanium
- Saman Hemarathna as Chief cook
- Lasantha Udukumbura as Sukiri, the makeup artist
- Prarthana serasinghe as Assistant director
- Nishantha Priyadarshana as Nishantha, the art director

== Production and release ==
This is the third cinema direction by Aruna Jayawardane, where he previously directed the two films: Nikini Vassa in 2013 and Happy Birthday in 2022. Saman Edirisinghe is the producer and Nalin Siriwardena is the executive producer.

Channa Deshapriya is the cinematographer, Tissa Surendra is the editor and Sunil Premaratne is the art director. Color combination handled by Asanka Wickramasiri and Eshan Ekanayake is the line producer. Assistant directors are Daminda Madawala and Indunil Deraniyagala, whereas composition done by Samarasiri Kandanage. Asanga Pererath involved in production management. Wasantha Kumaravila is the stunt director and Gayan Srimal is the choreographer. The film has been shot in and around Ayr Castle, Ayr Estate in Padukka.

Song lyrics are written by Venerable Kuttikulame Pemalankara Thero, Shehan Galahitiyava and Duminda Alahendra. Chinthaka Jayakody, Thilina Ruhunage and Mangala Galappaththi composed the music, whereas Surya Dayaruwan, Samitha Mudunkotuwa, Rooney and Surendra Perera made background vocals.

The song launch was held at the National Film Corporation's Tharangani cinema hall in September 2023. The premier of the film was screened on 1 February 2024 and island-wide screened on 9 February 2024.
