= Adaraneeya Kathawak =

- Theatrical release poster
- Sinhala: ආදරණීය කතාවක්
- Directed by: Priyantha Colombage
- Written by: Uwani Chamika; Priyantha Colombage
- Produced by: Chaminda Gamage; Priyantha Colombage
- Starring: Hemal Ranasinghe; Udari Warnakulasooriya; Bimal Jayakody; Aruni Rajapaksha
- Cinematography: Ruwan Costa
- Music by: Udara Samaraweera; Kasun Kalhara; Uresha Ravihari; Chithral Somapala
- Production company: Creative Force Productions
- Release date: 10 June 2016
- Running time: 126 minutes
- Country: Sri Lanka
- Language: Sinhala
- Budget: LKR 30 million

Adaraneeya Kathawak (transl. A Melody Of Love) is a 2016 Sri Lankan romantic musical film, directed and co-produced by Priyantha Colombage. It was released on 10 June 2016. Starring Hemal Ranasinghe, Udari Warnakulasooriya, Bimal Jayakody and Aruni Rajapaksha in the lead roles. The film was influenced by romantic musical Bollywood film Aashiqui 2. It is the 1253rd Sri Lankan film in the Sinhala cinema.

== Plot ==
A famous singer named Abhimana Jayawardhane was invited to participate in a reality show as a judge. At first, he refused to attend the show but in the end, he agreed to attend the show because of the request of Dewli who was famous for girlfriend of Abhimana.

Abhimana began to like a competitor named Piyawi Hansika out of many competitors in the show because of her talent. His decision was Piyawi should go ahead in the show but this was not liked by Dewli due to her jealousness towards Piyawi. Piyawi is a costume sales assistant from a rural village. Her only goal to win the competition and to provide money to her ill father using the prize of the competition. But she was disqualified by the next round but no one imagined that she would be removed from the show because of her talent.

Abhimana inquired and blamed Dewli regarding the removal of Piyawi from the reality show. Because of the unjustified decision of the programme, he left the reality show as a judge. But Piyawi thinks that Abhimana is the reason why she was out from the programme and she was angry about the reason.

After all disputes, Piyawi moved back to her village to carry out her family routine however she can. Piyawi joins as a maidservant in the kitchen of a restaurant. One day, Abhimana step into the restaurant with his manager named Uvindu. Piyawi and Abhimana met coincidently there. Piyawi blamed out Abhimana that he is the key reason why she is out from the competition.

Because of this incident, Abhimana was shocked and even more angry. Even newspapers also publish this news as a hit. Abhimana's biggest problem was why he was blamed out by Piyawi. Abhimana and Uvindu go to the remote village where Piyawi live to find an answer.

Meanwhile, father of Piyawi dies. Abhimana step into the house of Piyawi and get blamed again by the Saddened Piyawi. The reason is not so difficult to realize Abhimana that this was happened by a misunderstanding. After explaining Piyawi about the incident, Abhimana and Uvindu invited her to come Abhimana's house and go back to Colombo.

After all, Piyawi asks forgiveness from Abhimana and asks for her lost job. Abhimana explains the talent of her and ask to join for his next concert as his co-singer.

She accepts and while they rehearse for the concert they both fall in love. The concert becomes a success and afterwards Abhiman is diagnosed with a lung cancer because of alcohol consuming and smoking. He asks Dewli and Uvindu to help him to put up an act to make Piyawi attend the international singing competition and become the world champion. Piyawi doesn't know any of this. She gets shooed out from Abhiman's house. Abhiman tells her that she is a nuisance. After that she asks Uvindu what is the reason and Uvindu tells her the whole story. The Abhiman asks Dewli to attend the awards ceremony of that competition. Abhiman dies while watching the awards ceremony on TV on his bed. Piyawi comes back after becoming the world champion. When she comes to her house, she sees Abhiman's soul waiting for her.

== Cast ==
- Hemal Ranasinghe as Abhimana Jayawardena
- Udari Warnakulasooriya as Piyavi Hansika
- Bimal Jayakody as Uvindu
- Aruni Rajapaksha as Devuli
- Maureen Charuni as Piyavi' s mother
- Suranga Ranawaka as Piyavi' s friend
- Saranga Disasekara as Dhanuka, reality show host (Cameo appearance)
- Srinath Maddumage as cameo appearance
- Vishaka Siriwardana as Cameo appearance
- Anjalee Liyanage as Piyavi' s Friend
- Poojana Dandeniya

== Production ==
=== Casting ===
The leading actor, Hemal Ranasinghe was chosen by the director Priyantha Colombage after Hemal's performance in 2015 movie Pravegaya. Udari Warnakulasuriya and Aruni Rajapaksha were chosen by the auditions of the film. Bimal Jayakody is chosen personally by Priyantha Colombage for the leading supporting role in the film because of his talentness.

== Music ==
Adaraneeya Kathawak

Soundtrack album by Udara Samaraweera
- Released: 2016
- Genre: Feature film soundtrack
- Length: 29:17

The music for Adaraneeya Kathawak was composed by Udara Samaraweera, with lyrics written by Upul Shantha Sannasgala, Nilar N.Kasim, Nandana Vikramage, Chaminda Gamage, and Priyantha Colombage.

No.	Title	Music	Singer(s)	Length
1.	"Adare"	Udara Samaraweera	Kasun Kalhara and Kushani Sandareka	2:54
2.	"Sithuvili Pura"		Chitral Somapala	3:18
3.	"Sithuvili Pura (female version)"		Uresha Ravihari	2:29
4.	"Me Obata Ahenawada"		Kasun Kalhara	3:16
5.	"Ma Nogeyu"		Amal Perera and Kushani Sandareka	3:24
6.	"Ipaduna Thanadima"		Amila Perera	3:26
7.	"Ahasin Eha"		Kasun Kalhara and Uresha Ravihari	3:17
8.	"Sithuwili Pura (female version 2)"		Kushani Sandareka	3:21
9.	"Me Obata Ahenawada"		Kasun Kalhara and Uresha Ravihari	3:06
Total length:				29:17

== Reception ==
Adaraneeya Kathawak received mostly positive response from the critics. Most reviews praised director Priyantha Colombage and stated that this was the best creation among his films.

Buddhadasa Galapaththi of Dinamina praised the performance of the leading casts of the film. He mostly praised the performance of Bimal Jayakody in the film.

== Release ==
The first teaser was released on 14 October 2015, and was well received by critics and audiences. The first song, "Adare", was released on 11 August 2015. The film was originally planned for release in May 2016, but it was postponed due to production delays.

The film was released on 10 June 2016. It premiered on the 10 June 2016 at the Regal Cinema, Colombo at 6.30 pm.

After the release of this film, a film permit granted by the Censor Board said that the case file to excessive smoking and drug uses. The director and the assistant director were acquitted of support and pointed out that the effects of these drugs by the youth. The case was filed while the film making new box office records in Sri Lanka. Anyway Colombo Additional Magistrate refused the request by the National Authority on Tobacco and Alcohol (NATA) alleging that the film violates provisions of the National Authority on Tobacco and Alcohol Act. In Addition Magistrate observed that movie should be entertained as a whole not as isolated scenes.
