= Arumosam Wahi =

Arumosam Wahi අරුමෝසම් වැහි
- DVD poster
- Directed by: Priyantha Colombage
- Written by: Jayantha Colombage
- Produced by: Priyantha Colombage
- Starring: Mahendra Perera; W. Jayasiri; Wasantha Wittachchi
- Cinematography: Suminda Weerasinghe
- Edited by: Stanley de Alwis
- Music by: Samantha Perera
- Production companies: Prasad Color Lab, Madras
- Distributed by: Duthranga Films
- Release date: 20 December 2002
- Country: Sri Lanka
- Language: Sinhala

Arumosam Wahi (Fancy Rains) (Sinhala: අරුමෝසම් වැහි) is a 2002 Sri Lankan Sinhala children's drama film directed and produced by Priyantha Colombage with the funds of National Film Corporation of Sri Lanka. It stars Mahendra Perera and W. Jayasiri in lead roles along with Wasantha Wittachchi and Ajith Lokuge. Music composed by Samantha Perera, which was his maiden cinematic music direction. It is the 997th Sri Lankan film in the Sinhala cinema.

The film represented at Jakarta International Film Festival 2002 and 33rd Film Festival of India at New Delhi. The film was shot around Nachchidoowa in Anuradhapura. Ministry of Education approved the film as suitable for school children.

== Cast ==
- Mahendra Perera as Bindu
- W. Jayasiri as Circus manager
- Nuwangi Liyanage as Laila
- Wasantha Wittachchi
- Ajith Lokuge
- Sanet Dikkumbura
- Gnananga Gunawardena
- Saranapala Jayasuriya
- Bertie Nihal Susiripala
- Samantha Perera

== Soundtrack ==
No.	Title	Singer(s)	Length
1.	"Punkalasa Handai"	Amarasiri Peiris
2.	"Digata Dige Digaththiyo"
