= Hemal Ranasinghe =

Sri Lankan actor (born 1984)

Hemal Ranasinghe හේමාල් රණසිංහ
- Born: Hemal Sachindra Ranasinghe; 25 August 1984 (age 42); Matale, Sri Lanka
- Education: St Thomas' College, Matale
- Occupations: Film Actor, model
- Years active: 2010 – present
- Parents: Senarathne Ranasinghe (father); Vishaka Chithrangani Mediwaka (mother)

Hemal Sachindra Ranasinghe (Sinhala: හේමාල් රණසිංහ; born 25 August 1984) is an actor in Sri Lankan cinema. He has consistently been recognized as one of Sri Lanka's most popular actors since the beginning of his career. His talent has earned him numerous accolades, including awards for 'Best Actor', 'Most Popular Actor', 'Youth Choice Actor', and 'Trend Setter', reflecting his enduring popularity and success in the industry.

Hemal started his career as a model, appearing in several advertising commercials. He made his cinema debut in 2012 with Super Six. His achievements continue to grow, and he remains a prominent figure in Sri Lankan cinema today and into the future.

== Personal life ==
Hemal Sachindra Ranasinghe was born on 25 August 1984, in Matale. He has two elder brothers and one younger brother. His mother Vishaka Chithrangani Mediwaka, his father, and grand father are all Ayurvedic Specialists. His father Senarathne Ranasinghe died while Hemal was in a film shooting on 23 September 2010. He attended St Thomas' College, Matale for his secondary education.

He has stated that both his mother and father were supportive of his decision to make the arts his chosen career. Ranasinghe is versed in Martial Arts, which is a discipline he says he uses even now in his acting career.

== Acting career ==
Hemal's acting in the film, Super Six, marked as his debut in the film industry. He won the Special Jury Award at the Sarasaviya Awards 2016, a Special Jury Award and "The Most Popular Actor of the Year 2016" at The Fourth Derana Film Awards and The Most Popular Actor of the Year 2016 at the Hiru Golden Film Award for his role in Pravegaya. Hemal presented the television program Ayemath Adaren, which was telecasted on Hiru TV. He acted in only one Teledrama "Eelangata Mokada Wenne" which was telecast on Independent Television Network from 2014 to 2015. He won "Best Supporting Actor" in Rupavahini State Awards 2016 for that character. Since then, and still today, he has been awarded many times for his contributions to the Sri Lankan cinema.

== Beyond acting ==
In 2009 he participated in "The Model of the World" in Spain, winning the title 'Male Model of the World 2009', as well as the award for 'Best Glamour' and 'Best Catwalk' during the competition.

In 2010, Ranasinghe won the title of Mr. Sri Lanka and represented Sri Lanka at Mister World 2010 in Korea. The Colombo Fashion Week and Sri Lanka Design Festival are the two main shows that Ranasinghe takes part in annually. In 2018, he was appointed as the brand ambassador for People's Leasing & Finance PLC, and OXY in Sri Lanka.

In 2011, he participated in the Swarnavahini Dance Stars Dance competition. After months of competing, Hemal won 1st Runners Up in the competition. He also act as one of three judges of Hiru Super Dancer reality competition.

== Controversy ==
On 3 February 2026, Ranasinghe surrendered to the Sri Lanka Police and was subsequently arrested in connection with an alleged assault that occurred on 8 January in Havelock City.

== Filmography ==
Key
†	Denotes films that have not yet been released

Year	Film	Role	Notes	Ref.
2012	Super Six	Sanath	Debut film	
2015	Pravegaya	Hemal Sooriyabandara		
2015	Address Na	Kalinga		
2016	Adaraneeya Kathawak	Abhimana Jayawardena		
2016	Zoom	Nisal		
2017	Bandhanaya	Jayasoma		
2017	Dedunu Akase	Samudra Bandara Dissanayake		
2019	Thaala	Asela		
2019	Vijayaba Kollaya	Nayanananda		
2019	U Turn	Inspector Ranga Dasanayaka		
2021	Colombo	Oscar		
2022	Ashawari	Ranesh Singhewansha		
2022	Second Show	Prasanna		
2023	Ksheera Sagaraya Kalabina	Karali Nayaka		
2024	Sihinayaki Adare	Rehan		
2024	1970 Love Story	Raveen		
2024	Sihina Nelum Mal	Sahan		
2025	Ice Cream	Dudu		
2025	Devi Kusumasana	Konappu Bandara		
2025	Maria	Anthony 'Anta'		
2026	The Wife	Madhava		
TBA	Maaya Bonchi †		Filming	
TBA	Swans by the Sea †		Filming	
TBA	The Hidden City †		Filming	

== Awards and accolades ==
His performances have earned him numerous accolades at both local and international film festivals.

=== Derana Film Awards ===
Year	Nominee / work	Award	Result
2016	People's vote	Most Popular Actor	Won
2016	Pravegaya	Critic Award	Won
2018	People's vote	Most Popular Actor	Won
2024	Ksheera Sagaraya Kalabina	Best Actor in A Supporting Role	Nominated
2025	Sihina Nelum Mal	Best Actor in A Leading Role	Won

=== Hiru Golden Film Awards ===
Year	Nominee / work	Award	Result
2016	People's vote	Most Popular Actor	Won
2016	Pravegaya	Most Promising Actor	Won
2018	People's vote	Trend setter	Won

=== Sarasaviya Awards ===
Year	Nominee / work	Award	Result
2016	Pravegaya	Jury Award	Won
2016	Pravegaya	Best Actor	Nominated
2019	Vijayaba Kollaya	Best Actor	Nominated
2024	People's Jury	LUX Most Popular Actor	Won
2025	Sihina Nelum Mal	Best Actor	Nominated
2026	Devi Kusumasana	Best Actor	Nominated

=== Presidential Film Awards ===
Year	Nominee / work	Award	Result
2017	Pravegaya	Best Upcoming Actor	Won
2023	For portraying different characters in Thaala, U turn & Vijayaba Kollaya	Special Jury Award	Won

=== SLIM Peoples Awards ===
Year	Nominee / work	Award	Result
2018	People's vote (By Research)	Actor of the Year	Won
2018	People's vote (By Research)	Youth Choice Award	Won
2019	People's vote (By Research)	Actor of the Year	Won
2019	People's vote (By Research)	Youth Choice Award	Won
2020	People's vote (By Research)	Actor of the Year	Won
2020	People's vote (By Research)	Youth Choice Award	Won
2021	People's vote (By Research)	Actor of the Year	Won
2021	People's vote (By Research)	Youth Choice Award	Won
2022	People's vote (By Research)	Actor of the Year	Won
2022	People's vote (By Research)	Youth Choice Award	Won
2023	People's vote (By Research)	Youth Choice Award	Won
2024	People's vote (By Research)	Youth Actor of the Year	Won
2025	People's vote (By Research)	Actor of the Year	Won
2025	People's vote (By Research)	Youth Actor of the Year	Won
2026	People's vote (By Research)	Youth Choice Award	Won

=== Rupavahini State Awards ===
Year	Nominee / work	Award	Result
2016	Eelangata Mokada Wenne	Best Supporting Actor	Won

=== Signis Film Awards ===
Year	Nominee / work	Award	Result
2017	Adaraneeya Kathawak	Best Actor	Nominated
2023	Ksheera Sagaraya Kalabina	Best Supporting Actor	Nominated
2024	Sihina Nelum Mal	Best Actor	Nominated

=== HANIFF Awards - Hanoi International Film Festival ===
Year	Nominee / work	Award	Result
2022	Maariya	Best Leading Actor of Feature-Length Film	Won
