= Technical College (Sri Lanka) =

A Technical College in Sri Lanka is a vocational education and training center. Administered by the Department of Technical Education and Training, there are 33 Colleges of Technology and Technical Colleges island wide.

== History ==
The technical colleges in Sri Lanka originated from the Ceylon Technical College which was an institution of higher education for technical and scientific fields in Ceylon and a government department. It was established as the Government Technical College in 1893 at Maradana, Colombo. In 1906, renamed as Ceylon Technical College, it was the center for study of sciences such as chemistry, physics, biology and all technical training and development special in the areas of civil, electrical and mechanical engineering. The Maradana Technical College Building has become a landmark of Colombo.

When the Ceylon University College was established in 1921, the science section of the Ceylon Technical College was transferred to form the Department of Science, at the new University college which was affiliated to the University of London. The Technical College began preparing students for the external degrees in Engineering of the University of London since 1933 as well as for associate membership examinations of the professional institutions of civil, electrical and mechanical engineering.

In 1942 the Ceylon Technical College was separated from the Education Department and was made the Ceylon Technical College Department. Several years later began courses in accountancy and commerce. Soon after in 1950 the engineering courses were transferred to the newly established Faculty of Engineering of the University of Ceylon. Junior Technical Colleges were established in Galle, Kandy, Jaffna in the 1950s. In 1966 the engineering technicians courses were transferred to the Institute of Practical Technology. In 1964 it was absorbed into the Department of Technical Education and Training over the next decades the several technical colleges were established around the country and the existing junior technical colleges where upgraded.

Coming under the Department of Technical Education and Training, the principle technical college remained at Maradana, retain the name Maradana College of Technology along with 32 colleges of technology, and technical colleges today come under the purview of the Ministry of Tertiary Education & Training however it is currently under the Ministry of Youth Affears.

== List of colleges of technology and technical colleges ==
- Maradana College of Technology
- Galle College of Technology
- Ampara College of Technology
- Kandy College of Technology
- Jaffna College of Technology
- Anuradhapura College of Technology
- Badulla College of Technology
- Rathnapura College of Technology
- Kurunegala College of Technology
- Ceylon College of Technology
- Technical College Embilipitiya
- Technical College Homagama
- Technical College Ratmalana
- Technical College Kalutara
- Technical College Kegalle
- Technical College Matara
- Technical College Balapitiya
- Technical College Beliatta
- Technical College Weerawila
- Technical College Warakapola
- Technical College Pathadumbara
- Technical College Kuliyapitiya
- Technical College Anamaduwa
- Technical College Wariyapola
- Technical College Pathadumbara
- Technical College Matale
- Technical College Dambulla
- Technical College Hasalaka
- Technical College Nuwara-Eliya
- Technical College Bandarawela
- Technical College Monaragala
- Technical College Medagama
- Technical College Dehiattakandiya
- Technical College Batticaloa
- Technical College Sammanthurai
- Technical College Trincomalee
- Technical College Akkareipattu
- Technical College Polonnaruwa
- Technical College Vauniya
