= U Turn (2019 film) =

2019 Sri Lankan Sinhala film directed by Channa Deshapriya

- Poster of Sri Lankan movie U Turn (2019)
- Directed by: Channa Deshapriya
- Written by: Pawan Kumar
- Produced by: Maharaja Entertainments
- Starring: Hemal Ranasinghe; Bimal Jayakody; Thumindu Dodantenna; Chanu Dissanayake
- Cinematography: Striner Adams
- Edited by: Tissa Surendra
- Music by: Chinthaka Jayakody; Bharadwaj
- Distributed by: M Entertainments
- Release date: 13 December 2019
- Running time: 146 minutes
- Country: Sri Lanka
- Language: Sinhala

U Turn (Sinhala: යූ-ටර්න්) is a 2019 Sri Lankan Sinhala mystery thriller film directed by acclaimed cinematographer Channa Deshapriya in his directorial debut. The movie is produced by Maharaja Entertainments as a Sirasa Movie. The movie features the stars Hemal Ranasinghe Thumindu Dodantenna, Bimal Jayakody, Gamya Wijayadasa with the debut actress Chanu Dissanayake in the lead roles. The music of the film is composed by Chinthaka Jayakody with Bharadwaj composing music for the song.

The movie is a remake of the 2016 Indian Kannada language film U Turn – thereby becoming the first Sinhala remake of a Kannada movie. The film mostly received positive reviews from critics. The film ran for 50 days in theaters when it was released.

== Plot ==
Raveena (Chanu Dissanayake), a news reporter working on an article on the incidents at a flyover. She also has a crush on the crime reporter Adithya (Thumindu Dodantenna), whose help she seeks for research material on accidents on the flyover. She finds that each day some motorists move the concrete blocks that partition the road just to take a quick U-turn and avoid the traffic. They don't move them back and the blocks are left to lie randomly on the road leading to many accidents. A beggar sitting on the flyover notes down the vehicle numbers of bikers who violate the rule to take the U-turn. Then he gives the list to Raveena. She obtains the details of the culprits using her contact in the traffic department, with the intention of confronting them for their "short-cut" and writing an article for the paper. Her attempt to meet the first person on the list goes in vain. Later the same day, the police take her into custody and accuse her of killing the same person she wanted to meet. She is shocked and tells her side of the story. Though the senior police officer rejects it, sub-inspector Ranga (Hemal Ranasinghe), finds it believable and does some investigation. It is revealed that all the persons Raveena has on her list have committed suicide. They also noticed that they have committed suicide the same day they took the wrong "u-turn". Raveena and Ranga find another number has been noted by the beggar which is to be delivered to Raveena the next day. The duo trace the address and try to rescue the man, a lawyer (Rana Madhav), who has taken the u-turn on the same day. As nothing seems suspicious, both leave only to encounter the very death of the lawyer whom they came to rescue.

== Cast ==
- Chanu Dissanayake as Raveena
- Hemal Ranasinghe as Police Inspector Ranga
- Thumindu Dodantenna as Adithya
- Bimal Jayakody as Prasad
- Gamya Wijayadasa as Maya
- Veena Jayakody as Raveena's mother
- Sanyumi Nimnadi as Anuki, Maya's daughter
- Dayadeva Edirisinghe as OIC
- Priyantha Wijesinghe as Traffic police officer Jagath
- Nalin Lusena as Police Inspector Sagara
- Athula Jayasinghe as Kapila Sirimanne
- Rana Madhav as Nalaka Kalupahana
- Suranga Ranawaka as Sandamini
- Madushan Nanayakkara as Security officer
- Nishantha Priyadarshana as Raja
- Sunil Premaratne
- Prasanna Dekumpitiya as Prasa
- Randika Gunathilake as Ravi
- Pradeep Ramawickrama as Three-wheel driver

== Songs ==
No.	Title	Lyrics	Singer(s)	Length
1.	"Ira Handatath Rahase"	Sunil Ariyaratne	Umara Sinhawansa
