= Udaya Dharmawardhana =

- Udaya Dharmawardhana
- Born: Udaya Dharmawardhana
- Occupations: film director, producer, screenwriter, cinematographer and editor

Udaya Dharmawardhana is a Sri Lankan film director, producer, screenwriter, cinematographer, and editor. He created several music videos and TV advertisements. He also co-directed the feature film How I Wonder What You Are.

== Biography ==
Udaya Dharmawardhana began his career as an artistic photographer, and he continued his desire to see the world around him through the frame by becoming a videographer and shortly then cinematographer. After working as a program producer in a leading TV station in Sri Lanka for a few years, he became one of the most prominent music video directors in the country who severely contributed to forming music video art in Sri Lanka, taking it into a new approach. Udaya, still contributing himself with a lot of alternative films and short film productions, has become an inspiring personage among his contemporaries and upcoming young artists in Sri Lanka. Udaya's visual style and his inspirations are mostly attached to urban experiences. The hardship he experienced himself in the city has helped him with a better understanding of the alienated young lives within urban surroundings. One of the results was 'How I Wonder What You Are' (2009), which was Udaya's debut feature written and directed together with his colleague Chinthana Dharmadasa. It gained much recognition and was well received by critics for its controversial narrative and its poetic visual as well. He was also the co-director of photography in 'How I Wonder What You Are'. "Miles of a Dream is his first solo directorial feature film, which is a co-production of France and Sri Lanka. The film is based on the psychology of pain and suffering, on that point where we think that the approaching option is salvation, where we step into the next closest thing without even having logical thought or evaluation about matters, and where we take decisions blindly.

== Filmography ==
How I Wonder What You Are (2009)

Miles of a Dream (2013)
