= Chinthana Dharmadasa =

Sri Lankan film director and critic

Chinthana Dharmadasa චින්තන ධර්මදාස
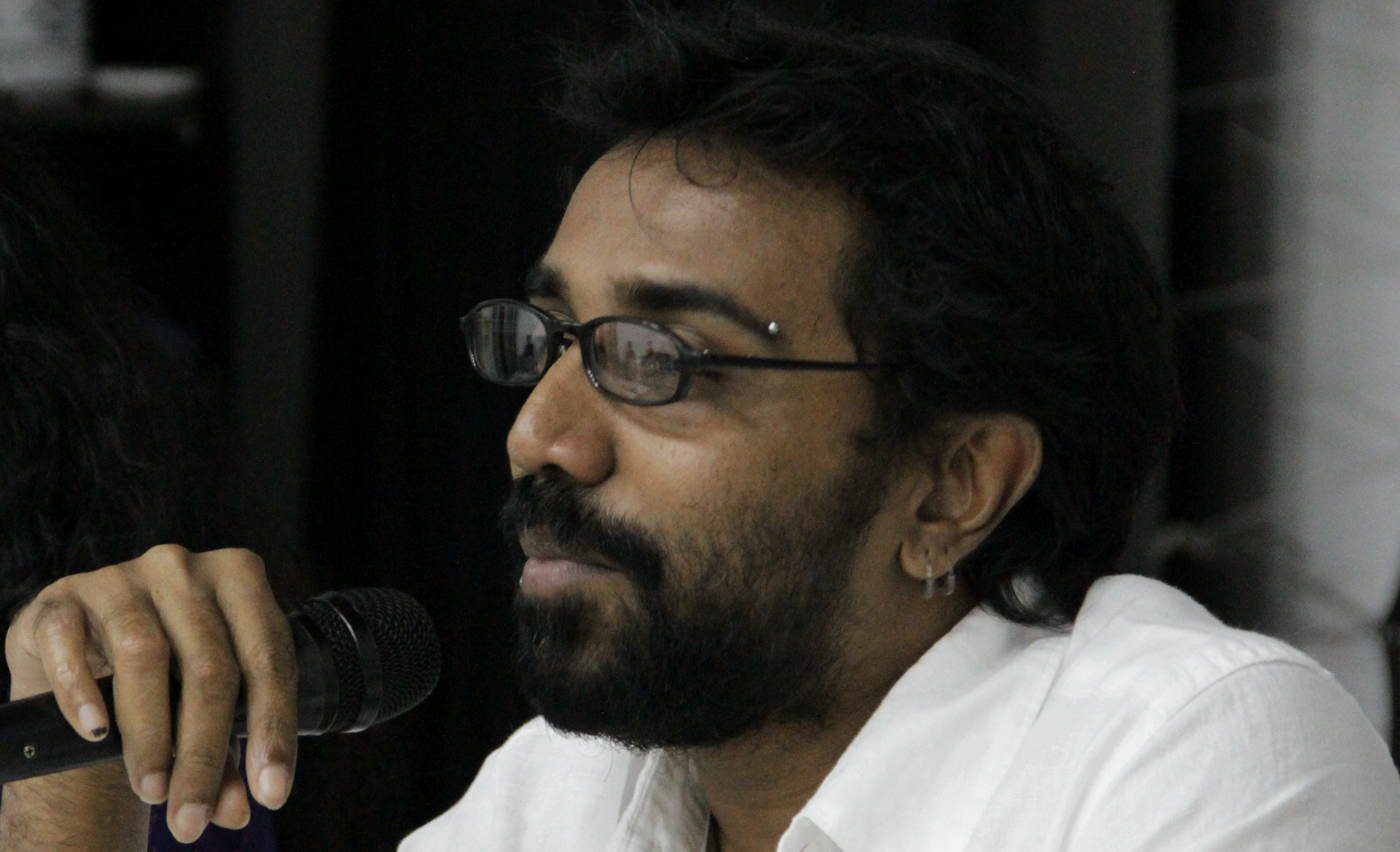
- Chinthana Dharmadasa
- Born: Gunesh Chinthana Dharmadasa; November 27, 1976 (age 49); Katubedda, Sri Lanka
- Occupations: Film director, film critic and screenwriter, author, creative director

Chinthana Dharmadasa (born in November 27, 1976) is a Sri Lankan film director, film critic and a screenwriter who is also a Creative Director in the Sri Lankan advertising industry. Dharmadasa has worked for several periodicals as a writer and directed several short films, music videos, co-directed a feature film and is popularly known as an opinionated blogger and a critic.

== Biography ==
Dharmadasa graduated from the University of Peradeniya Sri Lanka, with a Bachelor of Arts degree in Sociology and Philosophy and began his career as a media officer and worked in several government institutions. Shortly he moved into print media as a writer and a critic through publications such as the Ravaya weekly journal.

Later he studied film-making under Prasanna Vithanage and made his first short film 'Afterwards, he fell asleep'. This film was selected into the best category in shorts 2005 film festival, organized by the National Film Corporation, Sri Lanka. With this selection, Dharmadasa received a one-year film training scholarship at the National Institute for Film, Television and Theatre in Poland popularly known as the Lodz Film School. His second short film Insignificant which told a story of lives of people on the beach after the tsunami disaster, won the special jury award at the environmental film festival held by Asia Pacific television.

== Theater ==
Dharmadasa co-directed the stage play Iris in 2004 based on Hermann Hesse's short story with same title.

== Filmmaking ==
After making series of short films and music videos with the exposure received through his film education his debut feature co-directed with Udaya Dharmawardena How I Wonder What You Are, launched in 2010. It was a turning point in the Sri Lankan independent cinema with its groundbreaking low budget production which brought hope and opened the gates of film making to many young filmmakers.

Dharmadasa's latest cinematic expression Avilenasului was premiered in March 2020, setting a new mark in the Sri Lankan film culture as the first film representing the road thriller genre.

He is also a visiting lecturer on film studies at 'Sri Palee Campus', Digital Film Academy Sri Lanka and Sri Lanka Television Training Institute : SLTTI.

== Script Writing ==
As a script writer, Dharmadasa collaborated with Boodee Keerthisena's upcoming film, Alone in a Valley. and Sanjeewa Pushpakumara's debut film Flying Fish. He is also the scriptwriter of Udaya Dharmawardhana's upcoming French feature film Miles of a Dream.

== Writing and Critiques ==
Dharmadasa authored several fictions in Sinhala language Bitter Lips and the first erotic novel series in Sri Lanka Faculty of sex. He is an active blogger since 2010 and his blog CULT is a popular platform which discusses current social, political and cultural issues. His articles are published weekly in the 'Randiva' national newspaper under the title of his blog Cult. The book 'Cult : Bibili Nangina Belikatu' was published in 2012 which includes a collection of his articles published on the blog.

He also co-authored a book on his film How I Wonder What You Are which was a collective of critiques and reviews received for the film.

Dharmadasa is a songwriter, and a novelist whose stories are published weekly in a national paper.

Dharmadasa hosted several film programs at local television stations Sirasa TV – Art Eka, Siyatha TV- Swaroopana, and Hiru TV- Cult Eka.

== Alternative Screening Platforms ==
Dharmadasa adopted an alternative screening method for his debut How I Wonder What You Are which targeted small audiences in different locations. Screenings were organized by various groups that were passionate towards the film.

He then introduced this format of screenings as a platform for other indie filmmakers and film lovers to meet informally and share their thoughts and concepts and co-founded Kolamba Talkies.

== Advertising ==
Dharmadasa counts 5 years of experience in the advertising industry as a Sinhala copywriter and is currently working at 'Bates CHI & Strategic Alliance' as an Associate Creative Director.
