= Priyantha Colombage =

Sri Lankan film director and screenwriter

- Born: 1966; Colombo, Sri Lanka
- Occupations: Film director, screenwriter, producer
- Years active: 1998 - present

Priyantha Colombage (born in 1966) is a Sri Lankan film director and screenwriter who works primarily in Sinhala cinema. He is best known for his directorial debut Dehena (Trance) in 1998 & Dehena won the highest number of awards for Sri Lanka and represented the country at the Tokyo International Film Festival. His second film Vimukthi (Salvation) was the unanimous choice of local film critics to represent Sri Lanka at the Kerala, Milwelly and Cairo International Film Festivals.

== Career ==
Born in Colombo, Colombage started out as a journalist and photographer for the Sinhalese newspaper Ravaya.

A keen eye for storytelling led to his directorial debut Dehena (Trance), with which he became the youngest film director in the country at the age of nineteen. In 1998, Dehena won the highest number of co-awards for Sri Lanka and represented Sri Lanka at the Tokyo International Film Festival.

His second film Vimukthi (Salvation) was the unanimous choice of local film critics to represent Sri Lanka at the Kerala, Milwelly and Cairo International Film Festivals. Arumosam Vehi (Fancy Rains), the third production, was financed by the National Film Corporation and went on to win the award for excellence at the 2007 China International Children's Film Festival.

Colombage runs Creative Force, his own production house, through which he has directed a commercials for brands like Unilever, Nestle, Elephant House, Holcim Lanka, Ceylinco VIP and Lion Breweries, and also documentaries for the Sri Lanka Air Force, Eppawela Phosphate, and Holcim.

Colombage also produces TV programs. Kekulu Yaya a 65 episode educational programme for children. Yarns Bar, a comedy show, in addition to Deyyange Horawa, Aluth Sithuwam, Surf X-Force and the political satire muppet show Jabos Lane as well as a number of teledramas. He produced, wrote and directed the Sakuge Kathawa teledrama which aired on Swarnavahini.

== Filmography ==
Year	Film	Director	Producer	writer	Notes
1998	Dehena	Yes	No	Yes	Becoming the youngest film director in Sri Lankan Cinema won the highest number of co-awards for Sri Lanka and represented Sri Lanka at the Tokyo International Film Festival. Best Photography – Presidential Awards
1998	Vimukthi	Yes	No	Yes	Vimukthi was the unanimous choice of local film critiques to represent Sri Lanka at the Kerala, Milwelly and Cairo International Film Festivals. Best Photography – Critics Awards
2003	Arumosam Wahi	Yes	No	Yes	The Best Movie – 9th China International Children's Film Festival in Ningbo, China 2007; Presidential Award
2016	Adaraneeya Kathawak	Yes	Yes	Yes	
2017	Dedunu Akase	Yes	Yes	Yes	
2024	Mandara	Yes	No	Yes	
2024	Suriya Sulanga	Yes	Yes	Yes	Upcoming (In post-production)
