= Juliya (film) =

- Directed by: Sampath Sri Roshan
- Written by: Nishantha Weerasingha
- Produced by: Studio X Films
- Starring: Sampath Sri Roshan; Charith Abeysinghe; Nadeesha Hemamali
- Cinematography: Donald Karunaratne
- Edited by: Jenney Muun
- Music by: Ranga Dasanayake
- Production company: Pine wood studios
- Distributed by: EAP Theaters
- Release date: 18 July 2009
- Country: Sri Lanka
- Language: Sinhala

Juliya (Sinhala: ජූලියා) is a 2009 Sri Lankan Sinhala Love and Thriller film directed by Sampath Sri Roshan and produced by Charith Abeysinghe for Studio X Films. It stars both Roshan and Abeysinghe themselves with Nadeesha Hemamali along with Sasanthi Jayasekara and Ravindra Randeniya. The music was composed by Ranga Dasanayake. The film introduced high definition cinema to the country and was the first local movie to debut at an international theatre, the Odeon, Empire Leicester Square, England.

It is the 1,165th film in the Sinhala cinema.

== Plot ==
Dilrukshan (Charith Abeysinghe) the only son of a rich family after murdering his love leaves for London while his father shoots himself and dies. After some years he returns home and develop a love affair with Julia (Sasanthi Jayasekara), the daughter of a wealthy family. However, he was unable to proceed long as Dev (Sampath Sri Roshan) who too has been in London returns home in search of the culprit who murdered his sister.

== Cast ==
- Sampath Sri Roshan as Dev
- Sasanthi Jayasekara as Shakie
- Charith Abeysinghe as Dilru
- Nadeesha Hemamali as Juliya
- Ravindra Randeniya
- Robin Fernando as George Lewke Bandara
- Veena Jayakody as Mrs. Lewke Bandara
- Sriyantha Mendis as Lesli
- Rex Kodippili
- Sandun Wijesiri
- Sanet Dikkumbura
- Teddy Vidyalankara as Lesli's henchman
- Harsha Bulathsinghala
- Achala Walpola

== Soundtrack ==
No.	Title	Singer(s)	Length
1.	"Sarath Sande"	Bachi Susan, Charith Abeysinghe

== Reception ==
The film received mixed reviews from critics. The Daily News stated that "Julia is a movie with stunning cinematography, photography and cast performance but still and all, it disappoints the viewer because it looks like an empty-shelled blockbuster.
