= Kushani Sandarekha =

Sri Lankan singer

Kushani Sandhareka
- කුෂානි සඳරේකා
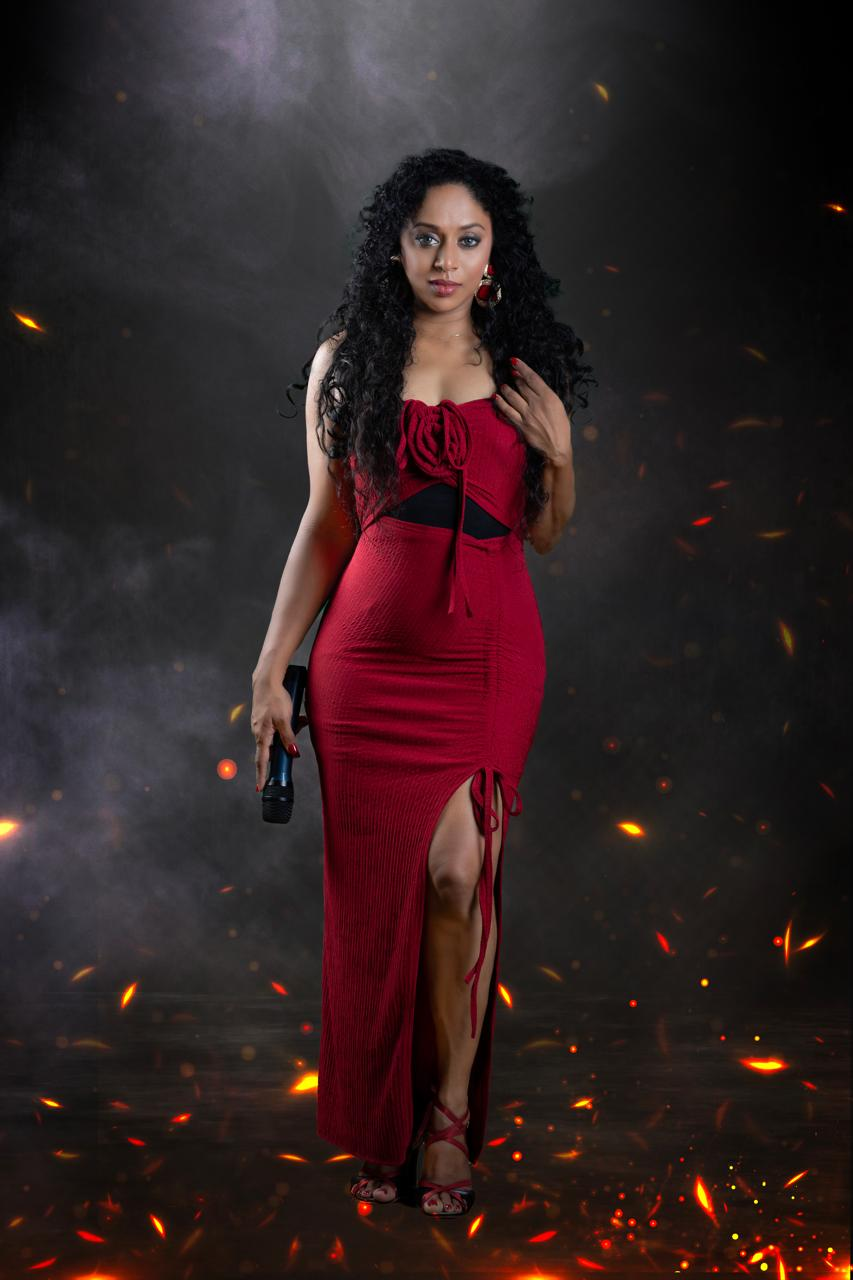
- Born: Kushani Sandhareka; Colombo, Sri Lanka
- Occupations: Singer; musician; Performer; Choreographer; Vocal coach; Actor
- Spouse: Kasun Kalhara
- Children: Deveendri Kalhaaraa Jayawardhana
- Relatives: Maya Damayanthi (Mother), Victor Vijayantha(Father), Anoja Weerasinghe
- Honours: Visharadh
- Musical career
- Genres: Pop; R&B; Classical Music; Jazz
- Instrument: Vocals
- Years active: 1987–present

Kushani Sandhareka also known as Kushani Sandareka (Sinhala: කුෂානි සඳරේකා), popularly referred to by the mononym Kushani, is a Sri Lankan pop, and R&B singer. She began her career as a playback singer at the age of 7 and has since worked on over 30 films. Sandarekha won the Best Singer award at the 34th Sarasavi Awards ceremony in 2017 for her performance of the song "Sithuwuli Pura" from the movie Adaraneeya Kathawak (2016).

== Personal life ==
Kushani is the daughter of Maya Damayanthi, and Victor Vijayantha. who comes from a media family, and her aunt is Anoja Weerasinghe. She attended Presbyterian National Girls' College in Dehiwala. Kushani earned her Visharadh in both dancing and singing.Kushani and Kasun have a daughter named Deveendri Kalhaaraa Jayawardhana. She acted in her first movie and worked as a background singer at the age of 7 in the 1987 film Chandi Raja

== Career ==
=== Movie soundtracks ===
- Chandi Raja (1987): Kushani's debut in the film industry began with a background song for the movie "Chandi Raja," directed by Sunil Soma Pieris and produced by Sunil T Fernando. The song, with music by Sarath de Alwis and lyrics by Hemasiri Helpita, featured Kushani alongside Greation Ananda and Latha Walpola
- Adaraneeya Kathawak (2016): Kushani's performance in this film earned her the Best Singer - Female award at the Sarasaviya Awards in 2016.
- Midunu Vishwaya (2023): She performed the songs “Mulu Sagarayama” and “Diya Binduwa,” with music composed by Navarathna Gamage and lyrics by Jayantha Chandrasiri and Madhumani Hapuarachchi.

=== Television shows ===
- Sirasa Dancing Stars (2008): Kushani Sandareka participated as a contestant on the Sri Lankan reality dance show, Sirasa Dancing Stars, broadcast by Sirasa TV. She emerged as the runner-up in the competition. Sirasa Dancing Stars premiered on February 9, 2008

=== Awards and nominations ===
- Best Dancer at the Youth Awards in 1998
- Best Singer at the Youth Awards in 1999
- Best Singer at the Sarasavi Awards in 2016 for "Adaraniya Kathawak"
- Nominated for Best Singer at the Hiru Film Awards in 2016
- Best Song of the Year at the Derana Film Awards in 2017 for "Dedunu Akase: Malkalaba Langa"
- Honoured with the Kalakeerthi Award
- Nominated for the Janadhipathi Awards in 2023 for her work in the film "Thaal"

=== Albums ===
- Rekha
