= 41st SIGNIS Awards =

- Date: August 25, 2018
- Site: Bandaranaike Memorial International Conference Hall, Sri Lanka
- Produced by: SIGNIS
- Directed by: Helen Osman

Highlights
- Best Picture: Premaya Nam
- Most awards: Premaya Nam (5)
- Most nominations: Premaya Nam

Television coverage
- Network: Upali Newspapers

The 41st SIGNIS Sri Lanka Salutation Awards Ceremony 2018 festival (Sinhala: 41 වැනි සිග්නීස් සම්මාන උලෙළ), presented by the SIGNIS, was held to honor the cinema and television in Sri Lanka on August 25, 2018, at the Bandaranaike Memorial International Conference Hall, Colombo, Sri Lanka. Malcolm Cardinal Ranjith, Archbishop of Colombo, Sri Lanka was the chief guest at the awards night. Theme for the Salutation Ceremony was "The Proud Display of Youth Vitality in the Global Motion Picture Discourse".

In the ceremony, 26 films and 18 teledramas were nominated for the awards and three Signis International Awards were presented for actress Kanthi Lanka, Sumana Amarasinghe and film conservator and producer Tissa Nagodavithana. Signis Prize Awards were presented on the occasion of the 30th anniversary for the Rev. Fr. Marceline Jayakody.

== Film Awards ==
=== Best Awards ===
- Next Aspiring Director – Roshan Edward
- Creative Merit Evaluation Certificates – Saheli Sadithma (Bandhanaya) & Dhanuka Dilshan (Dharmayuddhaya)
- Creative Coloring – Dinindu Jagoda (Sulanga Gini Aran)
- Creative Sound Combination – Priyantha Kaluarachchi and Alexandre Isubit (Nimnayaka Hudekalawa)
- Creative Animation – Buddhika Wijeratne, Chaminda Watawalawithana, Siddhartha Nayanananda (Bandhanaya)
- Creative Costume Designer – Jayantha Ranawaka (Aloko Udapadi)
- Creative Music Direction – Lakshman Joseph de Saram (Sulanga Gini Aran)
- Creative Cinematic Singer – Rosita Jesudasan (Nimnayaka Hudekalawa)
- Creative Lyricist – Sunil Ariyaratne (Premaya Nam)
- Creative Art Director – Lal Harendranath (Swaroopa)
- Creative Cinematographer – Channa Deshapriya (Nimnayaka Hudekalawa)
- Creative Editor – Chandana Prasanna and Udara Weeraratne (Nimnayaka Hudekalawa)
- Creative Script Writer – Kalpana Ariyawansa and Vindana Ariyawansa (Premaya Nam)
- Creative Supportive Actor – Kumara Thirimadura (Dharmayuddhaya)
- Creative Supportive Actress – Suranga Ranawaka (Premaya Nam)
- Creative Best Actor – Jackson Anthony (Dharmayuddhaya)
- Creative Best Actress – Samanalee Fonseka (Premaya Nam)
- Creative Direction – Vimukthi Jayasundara (Sulanga Gini Aran)
- Creative Best Film – Kalpana Ariyawansa and Vindana Ariyawansa (Premaya Nam)

=== Jury Special Awards ===
- Award for Editing: Saman Elvitigala – Sulanga Gini Aran
- Award for Acting: Saumya Liyanage – Nimnayaka Hudekalawa
- Award for Directing: Udayakantha Warnasuriya – Bandhanaya
- Award for Cinema Production: Thusitha Jayasena – Aloko Udapadi

=== Future Aspiring Directors Evaluation ===
- Chathra Weeraman – Aloko Udapadi
- Kalpana Ariyawansa and Vindana Ariyawansa – Premaya Nam
- Thisara Imbulana – Nino Live
- Priyantha Pathirage – Punchi Apith Baya Na Dan
- Rohan Perera – Heena Hoyana Samanallu
- Tissa Dias – Sellam Nethnam Lellam
- Sujeewa Gunaratne – Kaala
- Nihal Bandara – Seema Na Akase

== Teledrama Awards ==
=== Best Awards ===
- Creative Costume Designer – Pushpakumara Bandaragama (Diyamankada)
- Creative Music Director – Samantha Perera (See Raja)
- Creative Male Singer – Navaratne Gamage (See Raja)
- Creative Female Singer – Indika Upamali (See Raja)
- Creative Lyricist – Jackson Anthony (See Raja)
- Creative Art Director – Dharmakeerthi Wickramathilake (Diyamankada)
- Creative Cinematographer – Vishwajith Karunaratne (See Raja)
- Creative Script Writer – Aruna Premaratne (Badde Kulawamiya)
- Creative Best Supporting Actor – Ananda Kumara Unnehe (Badde Kulawamiya)
- Creative Best Supporting Actress – Chandani Seneviratne (Badde Kulawamiya)
- Creative Best Actor – Mahendra Perera (Badde Kulawamiya)
- Creative Best Actor – Nadee Kammalweera (Badde Kulawamiya)
- Creative Best Director – Ananda Abeynayake (Badde Kulawamiya)
- Creative Best Teledrama – Fahim Maujud (Badde Kulawamiya)

=== Jury Special Awards ===
- Creative Talent Excellency (Children): Senulya Danthanarayana – See Raja
- Creative Talent Excellency: Bimsara Premaratne – Badde Kulawamiya
- Creative Talent Excellency: Isuri Devapriya – Diyamankada
- Creative Talent Excellency: Viranga Ketaperachchi – Praana
- Special Jury Award (Direction): Jackson Anthony – See Raja
