= 42nd SIGNIS Awards =

- Date: August 2, 2019
- Site: Bandaranaike Memorial International Conference Hall, Sri Lanka
- Hosted by: Sri Lanka Catholic Cinema Parshadaya
- Produced by: SIGNIS
- Directed by: Helen Osman

Highlights
- Best Picture: Gharasarapa
- Most awards: Koombiyo (6)

Television coverage
- Network: Upali Newspapers

The 42nd SIGNIS Sri Lanka Salutation Awards Ceremony 2018 festival (Sinhala: 42 වැනි සිග්නීස් සම්මාන උලෙළ), presented by the SIGNIS and organized by Sri Lanka Catholic Cinema Parshadaya, was held to honor the cinema and television in Sri Lanka on August 2, 2019, at the Bandaranaike Memorial International Conference Hall, Colombo, Sri Lanka. The Secretary General of International Signis, Ricardo Younes; and Bertha Detta Padiandrajani (Rome) Maria C. Lorenzo, Secretary General of Asia Signis were the chief guests at the awards night. The keynote address was delivered by Prof. Saumya Liyanage.

In the ceremony, 26 films and 19 teledramas were nominated for the awards and the Signis Lifetime International Award was presented for actress Sriyani Amarasena.

== Film Awards ==
- Best Director – Jayantha Chandrasiri (Gharasarapa)
- Best Producer – Arjuna Kamalanath (Gharasarapa)
- Best Script – Jayantha Chandrasiri (Gharasarapa)
- Best Actor – Alston Koch (According to Matthew)
- Best Actress – Anoma Janadari (Davena Wihagun)
- Best Supporting Actor – Sudam Katukithule (Madhura Charika)
- Best Supporting Actress – Samanalee Fonseka (Davena Wihagun)
- Best Music Director – Chinthaka Jayakody (Gharasarapa)
- Best Singer – Inoka Ahangama (Bimba Devi Alias Yashodhara)
- Best Lyricist – Jayantha Chandrasiri (Gharasarapa)
- Best Cinematographer – Channa Deshapriya (Bimba Devi Alias Yashodhara)
- Best Art Director – Bimal Dushmantha (Bimba Devi Alias Yashodhara)
- Best Make-up Artist – Wasantha Purnawansa (Komaali Kings)
- Best Sound Producer – Sasika Ruwan (Bimba Devi Alias Yashodhara)
- Best Visual effects – Chathra Weeraman (Bimba Devi Alias Yashodhara)
- Special Jury Award – King Ratnam (Komaali Kings)
- Creative Merit Award – Nadeeshani Henderson (Udumbara)

Jury (Film)

- Fr. Lal Pushpadevwa Fernando (Omi)
- Dr. Edwin Ariyadasa
- Dr. Indika Ferdinando
- Mr. M.D. Mahindapala
- Ms. Nita Fernando
- Mr. Vadarshana Kannangara

== Teledrama Awards ==
- Best Director – Lakmal Dharmaratne (Koombiyo)
- Best Actor – Thumindu Dodantenna (Koombiyo)
- Best Actress – Kalani Dodantenna (Sahodaraya)
- Best Teledrama – Asanka Dodantenna (Koombiyo)
- Best Supportive Actor – Kalan Gunasekara (Koombiyo)
- Best Supportive Actress – Yashodara Rasaduni (Thaththa)
- Best Script – Lakmal Dharmaratne & Damitha Chandasiri (Koombiyo)
- Best Music Direction – Rohana Dharmakeerthi (Thaththa)
- Best Singer – Mihindu Ariyaratne (Visuvius Kandu Pamula)
- Best Lyricist – Kumara Liyanage (Thaththa)
- Best Editor – Sampath Wanniarachchi (Thaththa)
- Best Camera director – Stryner Adams (Koombiyo)
- Best Make-up Artist – Harsha Manjula (Sahodaraya)
- Best Sound Controlling – Indika Sisira Kumara (Thaththa)
- Merit Award – Randima Fernandopulle & Susiri Fernando (Visuvius Kandu Pamula)
