= Between Two Worlds (2009 film) =

- Directed by: Vimukthi Jayasundara
- Written by: Vimukthi Jayasundara
- Produced by: Philippe Avril; Michel Klein
- Starring: Thusitha Laknath
- Cinematography: Channa Deshapriya
- Edited by: Gisèle Rapp-Meichler
- Music by: Lakshman Joseph De Saram
- Release date: September 7, 2009 (Venice Film Festival)
- Countries: Sri Lanka, France
- Language: Sinhala

Between Two Worlds (Sinhala: Ahasin Wetei) is a 2009 Sri Lankan-French drama film written and directed by Vimukthi Jayasundara. It was entered into the main competition at the 66th edition of the Venice Film Festival.

== Cast ==
- Thusitha Laknath as Rajith
- Kaushalya Fernando as Kanthi
- Huang Lu as the young Chinese woman
