= SIGNIS Awards (Sri Lanka) =

The SIGNIS Awards are presented annually by SIGNIS, the Roman Catholic lay movement for communication media professionals, to recognize excellence of professionals in the film industry, including directors, actors, and writers. There are SIGNIS chapters in numerous countries and this article deals with the Sri Lankan chapter.

== Background ==
SIGNIS (Sri Lanka) developed in November 2001 from the merger of national chapters of OCIC and Unda. OCIC was the international Catholic communications organisation for cinema and Unda was the international Catholic organisation for radio and television. Both organisations were founded in 1928 in Sri Lanka. SIGNIS Sri Lanka is one of 16 Asian units of the worldwide association of SIGNIS, which general secretariat is established in Brussels, Belgium.

Leading directors in Sri Lanka cinema have described being inspired by the Film Review Caucus, a mini-theater organized by OCIC in Colombo. It arranged screenings and encouraged students to write reviews and analyze films. Director Prasanna Vithanage commented in 2007:

"We do not have a film school in Sri Lanka even now," he pointed out, recalling how the current crop of directors got their start. "We learned everything through watching films. Many of the young directors in the industry today were groomed at the Film Review Caucus, which was started at the mini-theater by then-director Father Ernest Poruthota. Then I followed the film course, which was a practical course," he recounted.

In March 2013, the director founded the Prasanna Vithanage Film School in Colombo.

== SIGNIS Awards (Sri Lanka) ==
The SIGNIS Sri Lanka Awards for films and television serials are similar to the Academy Awards in the United States. They recognize achievements in various categories such as directing, editing, musical scoring, camerawork and lighting. The awards ceremony, also like its Hollywood counterpart, has become a gala event that attracts film and television stars, directors, cameramen, scriptwriters, critics and journalists. The award presentations are interspersed with dance and music performances by leading artists, and clips from award-winning movies and TV programs. Aside from the industry awards, SIGNIS Sri Lanka also recognizes individual contributions to local cinema and television through its "Homage" and "Special Salutation" lifetime awards.

=== 2012 Awards ===
In September 2012, the 36th SIGNIS Salutation Ceremony was held in Colombo. Salinda Perera's Dheewari ("Fisherman's Daughter") -- see dheevari.com-- obtained the major prize in the cinema section. It swept all major award categories including Best Director for Salinda Perera, and Best Screenplay by Darrell Costa and Salinda Perera, from a novel by Raja Proctor. (It dramatizes the story of Valli, a valiant fisherman's daughter, who breaks social taboos in her fight to unify and modernize a fishing village long oppressed by the mudalali bosses.) Saman Kumara Liyanage's Sandagiri Pawwa received most of the key tele-drama prizes. CIC Agri Businesses' advertisement, created to communicate its corporate values, won the award for TV commercial for "creative arts, television and cinema", for 2012. The Jury panel included Rev. Fr. Benedict Joseph (Chairman of Signis), Senior Journalist Kala Keerthi Edwin Ariyadasa, and Senior Media Spokesperson Aruna Lokuliyana.

== Signis Awards of Merit ==
"Jayawilal Wilegoda Award for Best Amateur Critic"

1. 1986 - Nihal Peries
2. 1987 - Nisitha Warnasooriya
3. 1988 - Erik Ilayapparachchi
4. 1989 - Premachandra Roopasinhe
5. 1991 - Ajantha Hapuarachchi
6. 1992 - Sudath Mahaadivulwewa

1. 1993 - Thusitha Jayasundara.
2. 1996 - Ajith Galappaththi
3. 1997 - Charitha Dissanayake
4. 1998 - Nuwan Nayanajith Kumar
5. 2000 - Suranga Senanayake
6. 2002 - Boopathy Nalin Wickramage
7. 2003 - Indika Nishantha Udugampala
8. 2004 - Lionel Rajapakshe

== Best Picture ==
=== 1970s ===
  - 1973 - Ahas Gauwa
  - 1977 - Bambaru Awith

=== 1980s ===
  - 1981 - Soldadu Unnahe

=== 2000s ===
  - 2006 - Ira Mediyama
  - 2008 - Sankara and Aganthukaya
  - 2011 - Bambara Walalla
  - 2012 - Dheewari (Dheevari aka Fisherman's Daughter)

== Best Director ==
=== 1970s ===
  - 1973 - Dharmasena Pathiraja
    – Ahas Gauwa
  - 1977 - Dharmasena Pathiraja
    – Bambaru Awith

=== 1980s ===
  - 1981 - Dharmasena Pathiraja
    – Soldadu Unnahe

=== 2000s ===
  - 2006 - Prasanna Vithanage
    – Ira Mediyama
  - 2005 - Boodee Keerthisena
    – Mille Soya (Buongiorno Italia)

== Best Cinematographer ==
=== 1990s ===
  - 1996 - Andrew Jayamanne Julietge Bhoomikawa
  - 1979 - Andrew Jayamanne Handaya
  - 1972 - Andrew Jayamanne Haralaksaya
