= Per un figlio =

- Directed by: Suranga Deshapriya Katugampala
- Starring: Kaushalya Fernando
- Release date: 2016
- Country: Italy

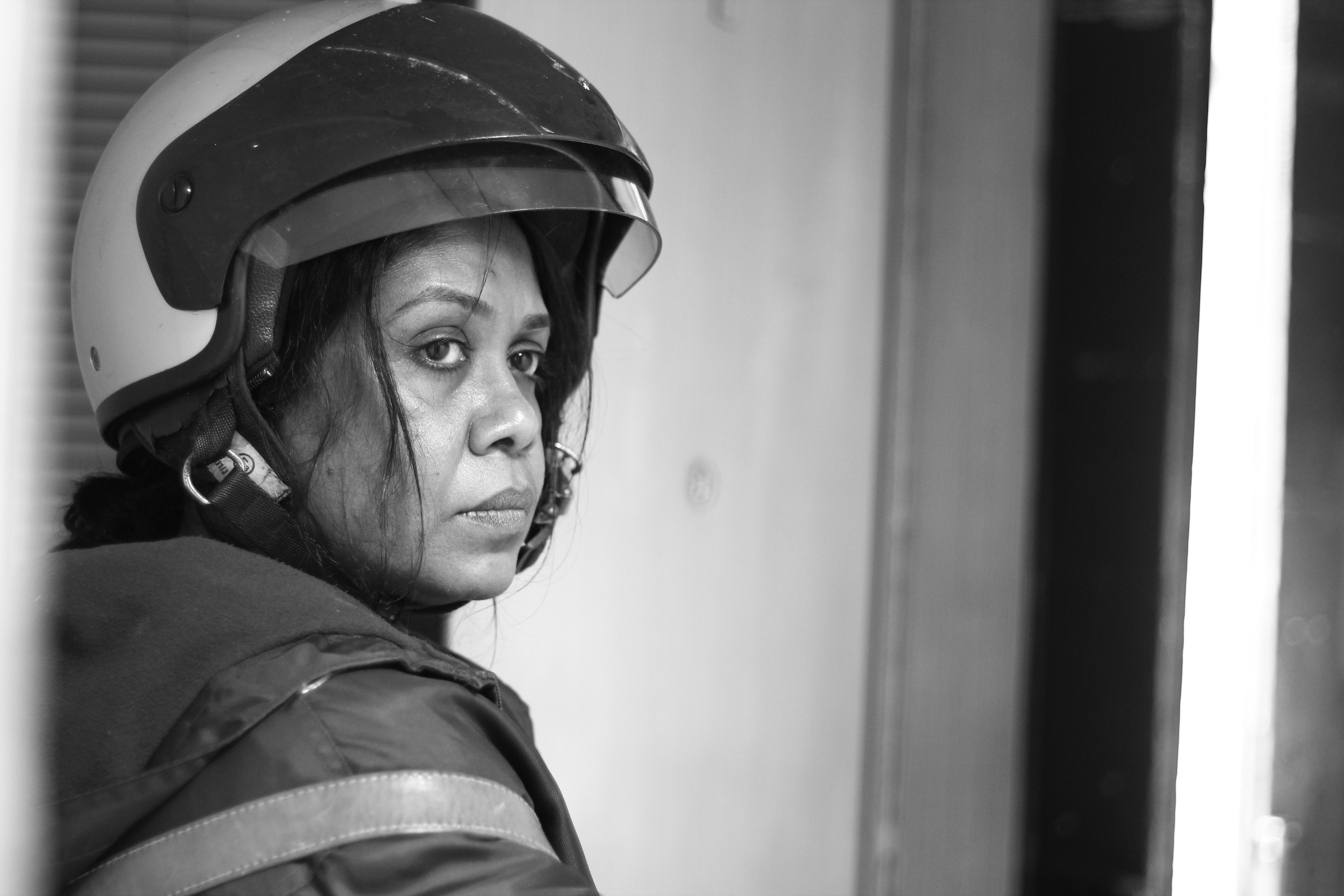
A still from the film.

Per un figlio (පුතෙකුට) is a film by Suranga Deshapriya Katugampala, an Italian citizen of Sri Lankan (Ceylonese) origin. It is set in northern Italy, and portrays the relationship between an immigrant Sri Lankan mother and her adolescent and partially-acculturated son. It thus explores issues of multiculturalism and of small marginalised communities. The principal rôle is played by Kaushalya Fernando. In July 2016, the film received a special mention at the Mostra Internazionale del Nuovo Cinema of Pesaro, in the Marche in eastern central Italy. In November 2016 it was presented at the Tallinn Black Nights Film Festival in Estonia.
