= The Forsaken Land =

2005 Sri Lankan film

The Forsaken Land Sulanga Enu Pinisa සුළඟ එනු පිණිස
- Film poster
- Directed by: Vimukthi Jayasundara
- Written by: Vimukthi Jayasundara
- Produced by: Philippe Avril; Francisco Villa-Lobos; Upul Shantha Sannasgala
- Starring: Kaushalya Fernando; Mahendra Perera; Nilupuli Jayawardena
- Cinematography: Channa Deshapriya
- Edited by: Gisèle Rapp-Meichler
- Music by: Nadeeka Guruge
- Release date: 14 May 2005
- Running time: 108 minutes
- Country: Sri Lanka
- Language: Sinhala

The Forsaken Land (Sulanga Enu Pinisa) (Sinhala: සුළඟ එනු පිණිස) is a 2005 Sri Lankan drama film directed by Vimukthi Jayasundara and co-produced by Phillip Amril and Francisco Vilolobos. It stars Kaushalya Fernando and Mahendra Perera in lead roles along with Nilupuli Jayawardena and Hemasiri Liyanage. Music composed by Nadeeka Guruge. It was screened in the Un Certain Regard section at the 2005 Cannes Film Festival, where it won the Caméra d'Or. It is the 1,055th Sri Lankan film in the Sinhala cinema.

== Cast ==
- Kaushalya Fernando as Soma
- Nilupili Jayawardena as Lata
- Hemasiri Liyanage as Piyasiri
- Saumya Liyanage as Palitha
- Pumudika Sapurni Peiris as Batti
- Mahendra Perera as Soldier Anura

== Reception ==
The film received fairly positive reviews from critics. The film holds a 63% rating on Rotten Tomatoes, with an average rating of 5.8/10.

== Recognition ==
The film was selected as the best Cine Mart project in The 2004 International Film Festival Rotterdam. The film won the award Prince Claus Film Grant at the same film festival.

The film made history when it was selected to honored at the International Cannes Film Festival. It is only the second time where a Sri Lankan film has entered to the competitive section of the Cannes Film Festival, after Dr. Lester James Peries’ maiden Rekava contest at Cannes in 1957.
