= A. C. Alles =

Former judge of the Supreme Court of Sri Lanka

Anthony Christopher Alles or A. C. Alles (1911–2003) was a former Judge of the Supreme Court of Sri Lanka and also a non-fiction (crime) writer.

== Early life ==
Anthony Christopher (Christie) Alles was born at Matale, Ceylon (now Sri Lanka) on 9 July 1911. After receiving his early education under the Jesuit fathers at St.Aloysius College in Galle, and at the Ceylon University College, he joined the Ceylon Law College as an advocate student, and, after obtaining First Class Honours in his Law Final, was enrolled as an Advocate of the Supreme Court in 1939. He obtained his degree in Laws of the University of London in 1942.

== Career ==
In 1942, he joined the Department of the Attorney-General as a crown counsel, and, as a member of the department, appeared at the Assizes in several important criminal cases for the state on behalf of the attorney-general. Notable amongst such cases were the Whitehouse murder case, the Wilpattu murder case and the Wirawila Tank murder case. He also frequently appeared for the state as counsel before the Court of Criminal Appeal. In 1962, he was appointed Solicitor General of Ceylon, and was leading counsel for the state before the Bandaranaike Assassination Commission.

In 1964, after he was appointed as a judge of the Supreme Court, he functioned in the Court of Criminal Appeal, and was a member of the bench which heard the appeals in the Kularatne murder case, the Kalattawa murder case and the Kataragama Beauty-Queen Premawathie Manamperi's murder case.

In 1972, while still serving as a judge of the Supreme Court, he was appointed as a member of the Commission of Inquiry established under the Criminal Justice Commissions Act to inquire into the insurgency of April 1971, and he continued to function as commissioner even after his retirement in July 1974. Shortly before his retirement, he functioned as the chief justice. He resigned from the Commission in September 1975, after the major work of the commission was concluded.

== Writing books ==
After his retirement as chief justice in July 1974, and his resignation as a member of the Commission of Inquiry under the Criminal Justice Commissions Act, in September 1975, Alles spent time in writing on famous criminal cases which included the S.W.R.D. Bandaranaike assassination and those detailed under his complete works. He wrote 22-books in all, and produced on average a book in almost every year from 1975, in which year he wrote on The Tragedy of Adeline Vitharne, which was reprinted as Vol. 7 in his Famous Criminal Cases of Sri Lanka series. His last work was The Murder of a Mystery Man: Charles-Christophe Taschereau, published in July 1998, at age 87.

- Works on Sri Lanka's insurrection and the Janatha Vimukthi Peramuna (JVP) [People's Liberation Front].
- Insurgency – 1971 : An Account of the April Insurrection in Sri Lanka by Justice A.C. Alles
- The JVP 1969–1989 by A.C. Alles

Complete Works:

FAMOUS CRIMINAL CASES OF SRI LANKA:

Vol. 1 (July 1977):

(a) The Attygalle Murder Case (b) The Duff House Murder Case (c) The Pope Murder Case (d) The Wirawila Tank Murder Case.

Vol. 2 (July 1978):

(a) The Whitehouse Murder Case (b) The Turf Club Robbery and Murder (c) The Kadugannawa Postal Bomb Murder Case.

Vol. 3 (December 1979):

The Assassination of Prime Minister SWRD Bandaranaike.

[Published in hardcover by Vantage Press, Inc., NY, U.S.A. (1986) as The Assassination of a Prime Minister. ISBN 0-533-06636-0].

Vol. 4 (September 1980) [Reprinted in hardcover as Murder Most Foul: 1987]:

(a) The Sathasivam Murder Case (b) The Kularatne Poisoning Case (c) Pauline de Croos – A verdict in dispute (d) Tragedy at Tismada.

Vol. 5 (September 1981):

Alfred de Zoysa and the Kalattawa Murders.

Vol. 6 (June 1982):

(a) The Talahena Murder Case (b) The Talpe Poisoning Case (c) The Murder of the Puttalam Widow (d) A Strange Case of Identification (e) The Dream that Revealed a Murder.

Vol. 7 [Second Edition: September–1982. First Edition 1975. Published in Sinhala as Wilpattu Sihiwatanaya (1976)]:

The Tragedy of Adeline Vitharne.

Vol. 8 (November 1983):

The Galenbindunuwewa Murder Case.

Vol. 9 (July 1984):

(a) The Killing of Arthur Thenuwara (b) Chandrasekera Dias – Murder or Suicide?

Vol. 10 (September 1988):

The Sepala Ekanayake Skyjack Trial.

Vol. 11 (November 1989):

The Trial of Walisinghe Harischandra and Others.

Vol. 12 (May 1992: hardcover deluxe edition. ISBN 955-95203-4-2):

Mathew Peiris: From Mysticism to Murder.

Other Publications:

(1) November 1976: Insurgency-1971- An account of the April Insurrection in Sri Lanka.

(2) July 1986: Facets of the Criminal Law.

(3) 1987: Criminal Cases.

(4) March 1989: A Glimpse of Paradise – Scenes from the Eastern Province (Travel). (ISBN 955-95203-1-8).

(5) December 1990: The JVP 1969-1989 (hardcover. ISBN 955-95203-3-2).

(6) 1993: In the Public Interest – The Rohini Dias Defamation Case and its Sequel (1993. ISBN 955-95203-5-0).

(7) August 1994: Selected Essays (Essays on legal and allied subjects)(ISBN 955-95613-7-5).

(8) February 1995: The Ranjani Taxi Cab Murder Case. (ISBN 955-95613-8-3).

(9) July 1996: Some Celebrated English and American Criminal Cases.

(10) July 1998: The Murder of a Mystery Man: Charles-Christophe Taschereau (ISBN 955-95863-2-7).

Alles's wife, Adelaide Doreen (6 February 1922 – 26 February 2011), has published three books:

(1) Traditional forms of packing & vending. [1982: 46p.: LCCN 93157860. LC MLCS93/07439(H)]

(2) Traditional foods & cookery down the ages. [1997: xi, 110p.: ISBN 955-96018-1-4. LCCN 98906093. LC TX360.S72.A431997]

(3) Jest for the pun of it. [1999: x, 123p.: ISBN 955-96018-2-2. LCCN 00370486. LC PR9440.9.A45J471999]

== Death ==
He died at age 91 on 1 January 2003 after a brief illness at the Nawaloka Hospital in Colombo, and, according to his wishes, the funeral took place within 24 hours on the following day.
