= Vimukthi Jayasundara =

Sri Lankan film director

Kala Keerthi Vimukthi Jayasundara
- Born: 29 July 1977 (age 48); Ratnapura, Sabaragamuwa, Sri Lanka
- Occupation: Filmmaker
- Years active: 2003–present

Kala Keerthi Vimukthi Jayasundara (Sinhala: විමුක්ති ජයසුන්දර) is a Sri Lankan filmmaker, critic and a visual artist. Jayasundara is the first Sri Lankan to win the Caméra d'Or, in 2005.

== Life and career ==
Vimukthi Jayasundara was born in Ratnapura, Sri Lanka but comes from Galle. He attended Mahinda College, and the Film and Television Institute of India in Pune.

== Filmography ==
Year	Title	Credited as			Notes	Ref(s)
Year	Title	Director	Producer	Writer	Notes	Ref(s)
2003	Vide pour l'amour	Yes	No	Yes	Short Film	
2005	The Forsaken Land, Sulanga Enu Pinisa	Yes	No	Yes	Directorial Debut	
2009	Ahasin Wetei	Yes	No	Yes		
2011	Chatrak	Yes	No	No	Screened at Directors’ Fortnight at the 2011 Cannes Film Festival	
2011	How Far 2 Heaven?	No	Yes	No	Documentary	
2011	60 Seconds of Solitude in Year Zero	Yes	No	No	Anthology film consisting of 60 directors	
2012	Light in the Yellow Breathing Space	Yes	No	Yes	Short Film	
2012	Jeonju Digital Project 2012	Yes	No	No	Anthology film co-directed with Ying Liang & Raya Martin; Segment: "Light in the Yellow Breathing Space"	
2014	Taprobana	No	Yes	Yes	Short Film	
2015	Sulanga Gini Aran	Yes	Yes	Yes		
2015	Elephant	No	Executive	No	Short Film	
2018	Thundenek	Yes	No	Yes	Segment: "Him"; Co-written with Asoka Handagama & Prasanna Vithanage; Marketed as Her. Him. The Other	
2019	Sulanga Apa Ragena Yavi	No	Executive	No		
2025	Spying Stars	Yes	No	Yes	Compete at the BFF	

Key
†	Denotes films that have not yet been released

=== Acting roles ===
Year	Title	Role	Notes
2012	Matha	Kamal	
2016	Nimnayaka Hudekalawa	Vishva's Friend	
2017	How to Become a Filmmaker with 10 Dollars	Himself	Documentary

== Awards ==
In 2005, Jayasundara received Caméra d'Or award at the Cannes Film Festival for the Best Debut Director for his film Sulanga Enu Pinisa.

=== Accolades ===
- 2021 – Jury member at 52nd International Film Festival of India, Goa.

== See also ==
- Cinéfondation
