= Vishama Bhaga =

2019 Sri Lankan drama film

- official poster
- Sinhala: විෂම භාග
- Directed by: Lalith Rathnayake
- Written by: Lalith Rathnayake
- Produced by: Shraddha Film
- Starring: Pansilu Wickramarathna; Pankaja Wickramarathna; Jackson Anthony; Kaushalya Fernando; Hemasiri Liyanage
- Cinematography: Palitha Perera
- Edited by: Tissa Surendra
- Music by: Chamara Ruwanthilake
- Distributed by: EAP Theaters
- Release dates: June 2019 (Shanghai); 16 December 2019
- Running time: 90 minutes
- Country: Sri Lanka
- Language: Sinhala

Vishama Bhaga (Sinhala: විෂම භාග; English: The Other Half) is a 2019 Sri Lankan Sinhala drama film directed by Lalith Rathnayake and produced by Ven. Aludeniye Subodhi Thero for Shraddha Film Productions. It stars twin brothers Pankaja Wickramarathna and Pansilu Wickramarathna in lead child roles with Jackson Anthony, Kaushalya Fernando and Hemasiri Liyanage in supportive roles. Music composed by Chamara Ruwanthilake. The film received positive reviews from critics and has been selected for more than 60 official award selections at international film festivals.

The film considered to raise funds for "Pure Water for All" charity project to reduced chronic kidney disease in Sri Lanka. The film premiered at the 2019 Shanghai International Film Festival and later showed at Savoy Premier, Wellawatte on 15 December 2019. In December 2020, the film has been uploaded to the internet for the free viewing.

== Plot ==
In a rural village in Sri Lanka, the family well becomes poisoned by agricultural chemicals. This subsequently leads to the untimely death of Ruwansiri's father who develops chronic kidney disease, leaving his mother works to support the family. At school, he struggles to understand his lessons in a rigid educational system that cannot go beyond rote learning. As an escape from the toxic environment around him, Ruwansiri finds solace in music.

== Cast ==
- Jackson Anthony as Hemachandra
- Kaushalya Fernando as Heen Manika
- Hemasiri Liyanage as Madiris
- Thilakshini Ratnayake as Sakunthala
- Priyantha Sirikumara as Bandara
- Pankaja Wickramarathna as Kamalsiri
- Pansilu Wickramarathna as Ruwansiri

== Production ==
Shooting of the film was completed in 2018 and the post production process was completed in early 2019.

== Acclaim ==
The Other Half was among the best five films at the 22nd Shanghai International Film Festival in June 2019 and nominated for the Best Script Writer Award in the Asia New Talent Awards. The film won the First Time Director (Feature), Best Narrative Feature and Best Picture awards at the Festigious International Film Festival in Los Angeles. At the same festival, Pansilu Wickramaratna won the Best Young Actor award and Kaushalya Fernando won the Best Supporting Actress award.

The film won the titles of Best Supporting Actor by Jackson Anthony, Best Cinematographer by Palitha Perera, Best Director by Lalith Ratnayake and Best Narrative Film at Asian Cinematography International Film Festival in the Philippines.

In January 2020, Jackson Anthony won the award for the Best supporting actor at Fox International Film Festival held at Kolkata, India. In October 2020, director Lalith Rathnayake won the Award for Best Director at the Ostia International Film Festival.

The film won its 50th international award at the Out of the Can Film Festival in Britain. The film won the Best Producer for Ven. Aludeniye Subodhi Thero and nominated for the Best Non English Speaking Film and the Best Producer awards.

== Songs ==
The film consists with one song and two poems. The song was composed by Lalith Ratnayake and poems composed by K.A. Milton Perera.

No.	Title	Singer(s)	Length
1.	"Wahinna Wassak"	Sandaru Gimhana, Mahesha Lakmali
2.	"Gale Wenuwa Mal Kala Nowe (poem)"	Chamara Ruwanthilaka
