= Mouse (2012 film) =

- Sinhala: මවුස්
- Directed by: Wasantha Moragoda
- Written by: Wasantha Moragoda
- Produced by: Wasantha Moragoda
- Starring: Kaushalya Fernando; Roshan Ravindra; Thisal Thulnith
- Cinematography: Thushantha Jinendrasinghe
- Edited by: Chandana Dilshan
- Music by: Sunil Dayananda
- Production company: MDC Media
- Distributed by: CEL & Ridma Theatres
- Release date: 14 December 2012
- Running time: 90 minutes
- Country: Sri Lanka
- Language: Sinhala

Mouse (Sinhala: මවුස්) is a 2012 Sri Lankan Sinhala children's film directed and produced by Wasantha Moragoda for MDC Media. It stars Kaushalya Fernando and Roshan Ravindra in lead roles along with child artist Thisal Thulnith and Robin Fernando. Music composed by Sunil Dayananda. It is the 1171st Sri Lankan film in the Sinhala cinema.

== Cast ==
- Thisal Thulnith as Sukiri
- Kaushalya Fernando as Rangi
- Wasantha Moragoda as Wijepala
- Robin Fernando as Principal
- Roshan Ravindra as Drug addict
- Srimal Wedisinghe as Alagiyawanna
- Awanthi Aponsu as Alagiyawanna's wife
- Jayani Senanayake as Servant
- Chathura Frenando as Teacher
- Chandi Ranasinghe
- Adisha Hettiarachchi as Adisha
- Lithmal Lokith
- Suren Rajapakse as Monk

== Songs ==
No.	Title	Singer(s)	Length
1.	"Mal Pethi Pawa Paralu Vee"	Yasantha Bandara
2.	"Malak Wage Meleka"	Ravindu Sathsara
3.	"Dawasa Dawasa Pela Dorin"	Yasantha Bandara
