= Murders of Russel Ingram and Eunice Peiris =

Sri Lankan murder case

- Location: Colombo, Sri Lanka
- Date: 10 August 1978; 48 years ago 19 March 1979; 47 years ago
- Attack type: Systematic administration of blood sugar lowering medication
- Deaths: 2
- Perpetrators: Mathew Peiris, Dalrene Ingram
- Charges: Death sentence

Russel Ingram and Eunice Peiris were homicide victims who were systematically drugged and murdered in 1978 and 1979 respectively by Father Mathew Pieris, an Anglican priest of the Church of St. Paul the Apostle, Colombo and his accomplice and lover Dalrene Ingram.

== Background ==
Father Mathew Peiris was a priest belonging to the Anglican Christian Fellowship, ordained by the Archbishop of Canterbury in the 1950s. He was known for his proclamation of god-given talent in performing exorcisms and due to his body markings which resembled stigmata, many disciples flocked around him to console themselves of their personal issues. Among them were Russel Ingram and his wife Dalrene, parents of three young children. From 1976 onwards, the Ingrams attended Father Peiris's exorcism ceremonies at his church on Thursdays. Because both of them lost their employment in close proximity to each other, Father Peiris employed Dalrene as his secretary due to her typing skills and later found employment for Russel at Lake House. As time passed, they became good friends with Father Peiris and his wife Eunice. On 6 February 1978, the Father and his wife went on a world tour leaving the young couple in-charge of their vicarage. On 25 April, Father Peiris returned alone while wife Eunice decided to stay with their children a little longer in the United Kingdom.

=== Death of Russel Ingram ===
On 9 June 1978, Russel mysteriously started suffering from somnolence and episodes of unconsciousness. He was given medication by Father Peiris, who told they were prescribed by Dr. Lakshman Weerasena, a local family physician. But the drowsiness continued, and on 26 June he was admitted to the General Hospital. During the course of next three weeks, there were four attacks of hypoglycemia during which he was unconscious or stuporous. Dr. Ernie Peiris diagnosed him of Insulinoma while Dr. P. A. P. Joseph continued to treat him. Following dextrose infusion, there were no more attacks and a glucose tolerance test on 3 July showed his blood sugar level was normal. Father Peiris and Russel's wife Dalrene frequently visited the patient with liquid diet and he was discharged on 14 July. The next day Dr. Joseph who had visited the vicarage observed that Russel was not capable of doing a simple arithmetic calculation, which was a telltale sign of brain damage. The next day, Dalrene's sister saw Father Peiris giving Russel some tablets and a capsule with a cup of tea, but after a few minutes from ingesting them, he collapsed after sweating profusely. After 2 days of staying at home due to drowsiness, a deeply unconscious Russel was admitted again on 18 July with an astounding zero blood sugar level in his body. (Note: Laboratory technician Oliver Fernando who did the test mentioned that it was the first and only instance in his 30 years of doing blood tests, where he saw a human being reaching zero blood sugar level in his body. He had to twice repeat the test just to make sure it was not an instrumentation error.) On admission he had irreversible brain damage, but with 50% dextrose infusion his blood sugar rose to three times the normal level. The following day, his blood sugar picked up with 2 infusions of 5% dextrose and remained well above normal values. Father Peiris and Dalrene continued to visit him with liquid diet which was added to his nasogastric tube by the nurses. However, between 26 July and 3 August, Russel got five more hypoglycemic attacks even-though 50% dextrose was administered during those days. On 10 August, Russel Ingram died.

=== Death of Eunice Peiris ===
On 6 December 1978, Eunice returned home from abroad. Within a few weeks, she became slow in speech and lethargic. Father Peiris consulted family physician Dr. Weerasena who prescribed her medications for anxiety and puffiness of stomach. During the visit, Father Peiris also obtained a drug to reduce blood pressure for himself. On 15 January 1979 Dr. Weerasena was requested at the vicarage and found Eunice unconscious with an undetectable blood pressure. She was admitted to Durdans Hospital but during the next few days, the Doctors continuously shifted, first Dr. Panditharatne and then Dr. Sathanandan who was not aware that Eunice had been brought unconscious and acting on the history given by Father Peiris, diagnosed endogenous reactive depression and gave her a mild dose of Tofranil. He equated the depression to a condition resulting from a family bereavement, and after showing commendable progress, Eunice was released on 20 January. However, Father Peiris continued the medication and several tests saying they were prescribed by Dr. Weerasena and Dr. Ernie Peiris. Eunice was once again admitted to the hospital on 31 January. She suffered irreversible brain damage and was unconscious. Blood pressure was just below normal but blood sugar was very low. Based on the readings of the extended glucose tolerance test, Dr. Rajah Silva inquired from Father Peiris whether Eunice had taken anti-diabetic drugs, to which he replied "she was not a diabetic, so no". On 1 February she underwent a blood transfusion and was given antibiotics and 50% dextrose until 7 February, however since she had suffered irreversible brain damage, from that point onward remained unconscious until her death on 19 March.

== Suspicion ==
During Russel’s autopsy, the initially diagnosed insulinoma was not identified. But despite being on rare grounds that it was possible for an insulinoma to form at locations other than the pancreas and also because no other suspicions arose, the case was considered closed. It only came to limelight when Eunice was admitted five months later, but thanks to the vigilance and intuition of two young medical interns at the time, Doctors Mohan De Silva and Terrence De Silva.

During treatments of Eunice, the intern on-call at the ward Dr. Terrence was perplexed to see some abnormalities in the fasting blood sugar reports. He also recalled how Father Peiris used to repetitively tell him "glucose was bad for Eunice". But after administering what was needed for her condition and since she kept on progressively deteriorating, Dr. Terrence was in dismay thinking whether he administered the correct treatment or not. One day during the lunch break, he discussed the case with his colleagues who also agreed with the given treatment. But when Dr. Terrence specifically mentioned about the authoritative Anglican priest who kept on disagreeing with the treatment protocol, it didn't take long for his colleague Dr. Mohan to recall that five months earlier, an Anglican priest also admitted a male patient for hypoglycemia and that he died under mysterious circumstances. At a hunch, the two medical interns surreptitiously obtained details from hospital records and found out that it was the same priest who admitted both Russel and Eunice.

== Investigation ==
When the two medical interns escalated their finding to Dr. Dayasiri Fernando, Dr. P. A. P. Joseph and Dr. Ernie Peiris, they unanimously agreed on the intimidating resemblance of the two medical mysteries. Criminal Investigation Department (CID) was notified and an investigation was launched.

Father Peiris was a diabetic himself and often read about hypoglycemia and blood sugar levels. Police also found the book Body Mind and Sugar by E.M. Abrahamson and A.W. Pezet in his possession, with evidence of extensive reading and bookmarks on certain sections. They also found that during the span of three months, he had purchased 80 tablets of Euglucon, which is commonly prescribed for hyperglycemia. Unbeknownst to officials, he had been systematically feeding meals laced with Euglucon to both Russel and Eunice, causing their blood sugar levels to drastically decrease. Dalrene's sister and one of Father Peiris's daughters also gave testimonials that they witnessed him giving pills to both Russel and Eunice on different occasions. CID also uncovered Father Peiris and Dalrene's adultery and confiscated medical letters indicating Father Peiris had withheld crucial information regarding Eunice's health from her doctors. One after the other, the diabolical plot kept on unraveling.

== Trial, conviction and aftermath ==
After a highly publicized trial, on 15 February 1984, a High Court bench of three judges led by Justice Tissa Bandaranayake held it proved beyond a reasonable doubt that Russel Ingram (aged 32) and Eunice Peiris (aged 59) had suffered permanent brain damage at the time of their last hospitalization and that each of them died of pneumonia caused by prolonged unconsciousness resulting from hypoglycemia induced by Euglucon. Motive was established as amatory and the accused, allegedly worked together to eliminate their respective spouses. Both Father Mathew Peiris and Dalrene Ingram were sentenced to death for the double homicide of Russel Ingram and Eunice Peiris. But on 28 June 1985, the death sentences were commuted to life imprisonment. On 12 February 1988, Court of Appeal of Sri Lanka acquitted Dalrene Ingram, but Father Peiris's conviction was affirmed where he remained incarcerated. On 3 February 1992, Supreme Court of Sri Lanka dismissed his second appeal. On 28 October 1997, after serving 15 years, he was released under a general amnesty and died in his home in Moratuwa on 12 May 1998, aged 80.

== In other media ==
- Justice A. C. Alles documented the murder in his Famous criminal cases of Sri Lanka book series - Vol. 12 (1992) titled: Mathew Peiris - From Mysticism to Murder.
- Prof. Ravindra Fernando's 2015 bestseller Murders at the Vicarage: The Mathew Peiris Case covered both the incident and the trial.
- The murders also inspired the 2018 movie According to Matthew directed by Chandran Rutnam.
