= Spying Stars =

2025 Science fantasy drama film by Vimukthi Jayasundara

- Official poster
- Directed by: Vimukthi Jayasundara
- Screenplay by: Vimukthi Jayasundara
- Produced by: Nila Madhab Panda; Vincent Wang
- Starring: Indira Tiwari; Kaushalya Fernando; Samanalee Fonseka; Saumya Liyanage
- Cinematography: Eeshit Narain
- Edited by: Saman Alvitigala
- Music by: Alokananda Dasgupta
- Production companies: Eleeanora Images; House on Fire
- Release date: 23 September 2025 (Busan)
- Running time: 99 minutes
- Countries: Sri Lanka; India; France
- Language: Sinhala

Spying Stars is a 2025 Science fantasy, drama film directed by Vimukthi Jayasundara and produced by Nila Madhab Panda and Vincent Wang. Starring Indira Tiwari, Kaushalya Fernando, Samanalee Fonseka and Saumya Liyanage, the film follows the journey of Anandi, a bio-technician, who travels to Hanuman Island to perform last rites of her late father. But when she arrives, she's forced into quarantine at a distant hotel because a pandemic has broken out in a world ruled by machines.

An Indo-French-Sri Lankan co-production, it had its world premiere at the 30th Busan International Film Festival in Competition on 23 September 2025 vying for the various Busan Awards.

== Synopsis ==
Anandi, a bioengineer, comes back to the Earth after spending years in space. But soon after arriving, she's sent to a quiet mountain resort to be quarantined because of a fast-spreading virus called illvibe. Though the resort is beautiful and fancy, but Anandi notices strange things such as hidden cameras, a UFO heading toward the Earth, and people in the town disappearing or dying without any clear reason. Her sadness grows when her father's ashes arrive, showing he also died from the virus. One day, Anandi runs away into the forest and finds shelter with Nita, a transgender resort worker who had been secretly watching her, and Nita's mother. As she spends time with them, away from the rest of the world, Anandi slowly starts to heal from her grief.

== Cast ==
- Indira Tiwari as Anandi
- Kaushalya Fernando as Nita's Mother
- Samanalee Fonseka as Wasana
- Saumya Liyanage as Scientist
- Hidaayath Hazeer as Nita
- Shreerupa Mithra guest appearance

== Production ==
The film produced by Nila Madhab Panda, Vincent Wang's House on Fire and National Film Corporation of Sri Lanka Productions, is directed by Vimukthi Jayasundara. The film received backing from the International Film Festival Rotterdam’s Hubert Bals Fund, and is supported by France’s CNC – Aide aux CInemas du Monde fund and Taiwan Creative Content Agency’s Taiwan International co-funding program. It was shot around the hills of central Sri Lanka in October 2024.

The film also received the CHF 20,000 for post-production from visions sud est, the Swiss fund for film in countries with low production capacity.

== Release ==
Bangkok-based Diversion has acquired the international sales rights of the film in August 2025.

Spying Stars competed in the Competition section of the 30th Busan International Film Festival on 23 September 2025 for 'Bosan Awards'.

== Accolades ==
The film competed for various Vision Awards at Busan International Film Festival.

| Award | Date of ceremony | Category | Recipient(s) | Result | Ref. |
|---|---|---|---|---|---|
| Busan International Film Festival | September 26, 2025 | Main Competition (Official Selection) | Spying Stars | Nominated | |
