= Alston Koch =

Sri Lankan actor and musician

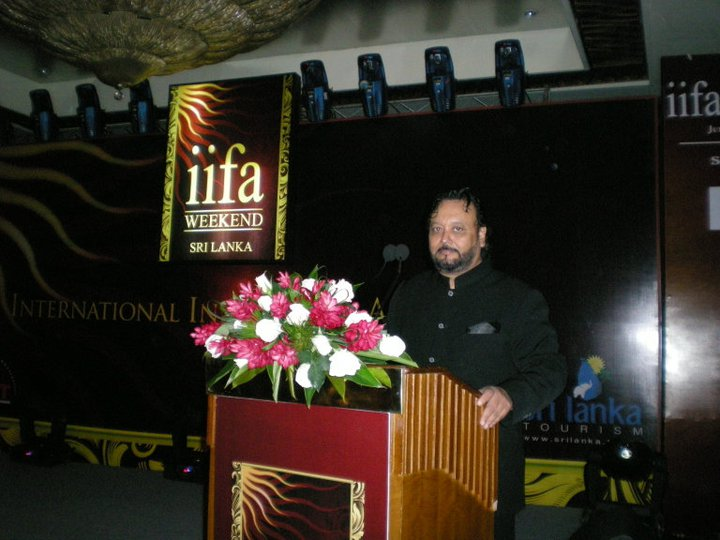
- Koch delivers a speech at 11th IIFA Awards

Background information
- Born: Colombo, Sri Lanka (then Ceylon)
- Genres: Ambient, pop, jazz, blues, folk, trance
- Occupations: Film Producer, Actor, Singer-songwriter, composer & entrepreneur
- Years active: 1975–present
- Website: alstonkoch.com Alston Koch Facebook

Alston Koch is an Australian-Sri Lankan singer-songwriter, film producer, record producer and actor.

After gaining international success in the late 1970s, he was often described in the Australian media as "Asia's King of Pop" or "Pop King of Asia". He has performed worldwide and achieved success in countries including Australia, Indonesia, Thailand, Malaysia, Singapore, India and Sri Lanka.

He received certificates of recognition from the California State Senate and United States Congress for improving the lives of communities in America.

In October 2025, Koch was appointed Envoy to Australia and the Pacific Region by the Commonwealth Union, representing the organization in promoting regional collaboration, inclusivity, and sustainability under the People's Charter of the Commonwealth.

== Biography ==
He migrated to Sydney, Australia, where he was successful in the music industry while recording for RCA/Laser Records and the TV network Channel 9's "Living Sound" recording label.

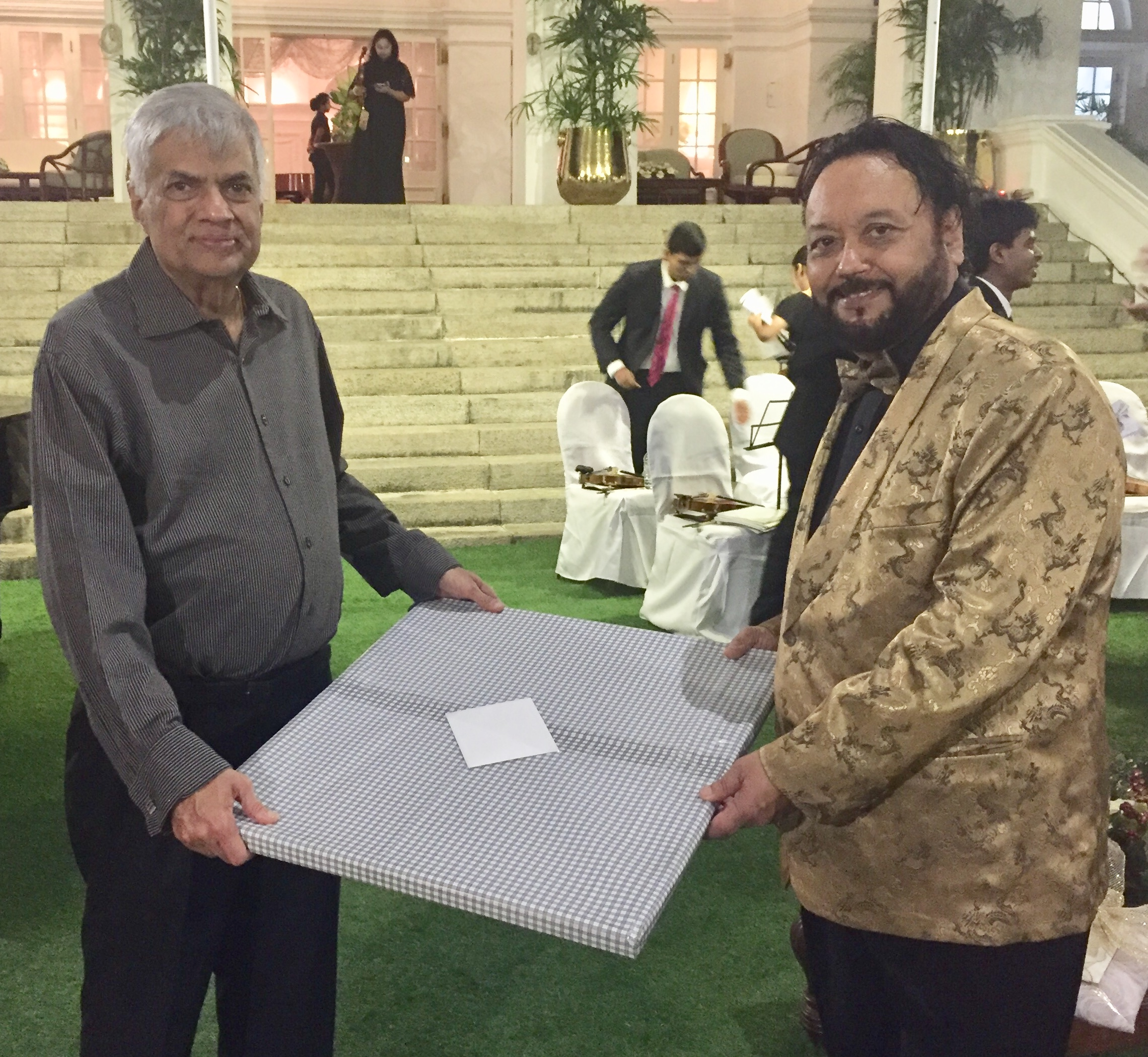
Sri Lankan Prime Minister Ranil Wickremesinghe awards Special Presentation to Koch in 2017.

In Australia, he formed his band Dark Tan and recorded three international hits on the RCA label. He has performed internationally with Dark Tan, S-witch, and as a solo artist. One notable appearance was during The Stars & Stripes Concert in 1976, performing under the Sydney Harbour Bridge on a floating pontoon for Radio 2SM. Rock Brains of the Universe and music historian Glenn A. Baker have said that Koch and Dark Tan were the originators of disco music in Australia. Since 1975 Koch has released 21 singles and 4 albums through record labels such as RCA, BMG, EMI and Sony.

In 1986 Koch was selected and commissioned by the Australian Task Force to write, produce and perform the America's Cup album The Kookaburra Connection. Its theme song "Kookaburra" was released as a single and music video broadcast during the race.

His first self written major hit, "Disco Lady", earned him his first gold record. The song also won him and Dark Tan the Best New Talent at the 1979 International Disc Jockey Association Awards. In the same year, Dark Tan also won Australia's Observer newspaper's Best Disco Band award.

The Daily Mirror (Australia) presented them with the Best Disco Band Award in 1978 and the producers of the Channel 10 TV show Thank God it's Friday presented the band with a gold disc during the performance of "Disco Lady".

Koch received his first ARIA accredited award for Melissa's "Read My Lips" (1990). He also received three gold awards and one platinum award from ARIA and a gold disc from RCA/Laser Records in 1978 for "Disco Lady".

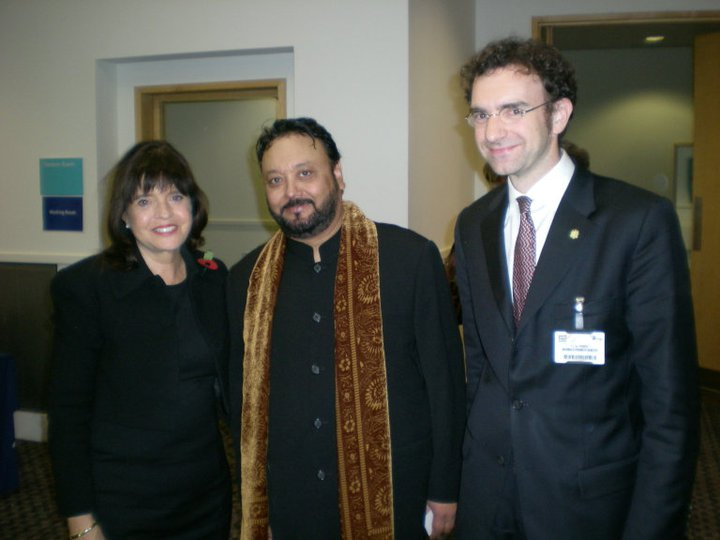
Alston Koch is with British Minister of State Barbara Follett.

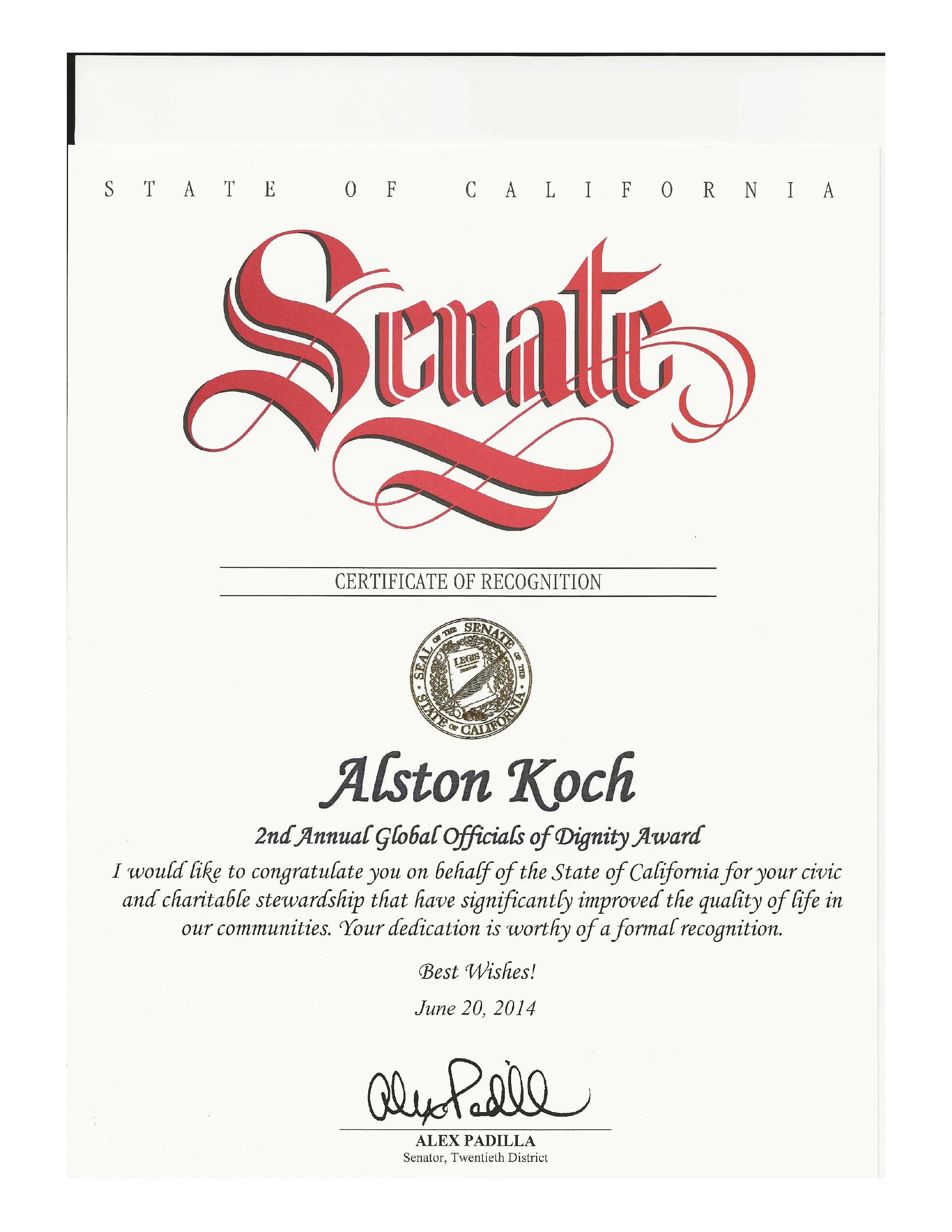
State of California Senate's Certificate of Recognition to Alston Koch

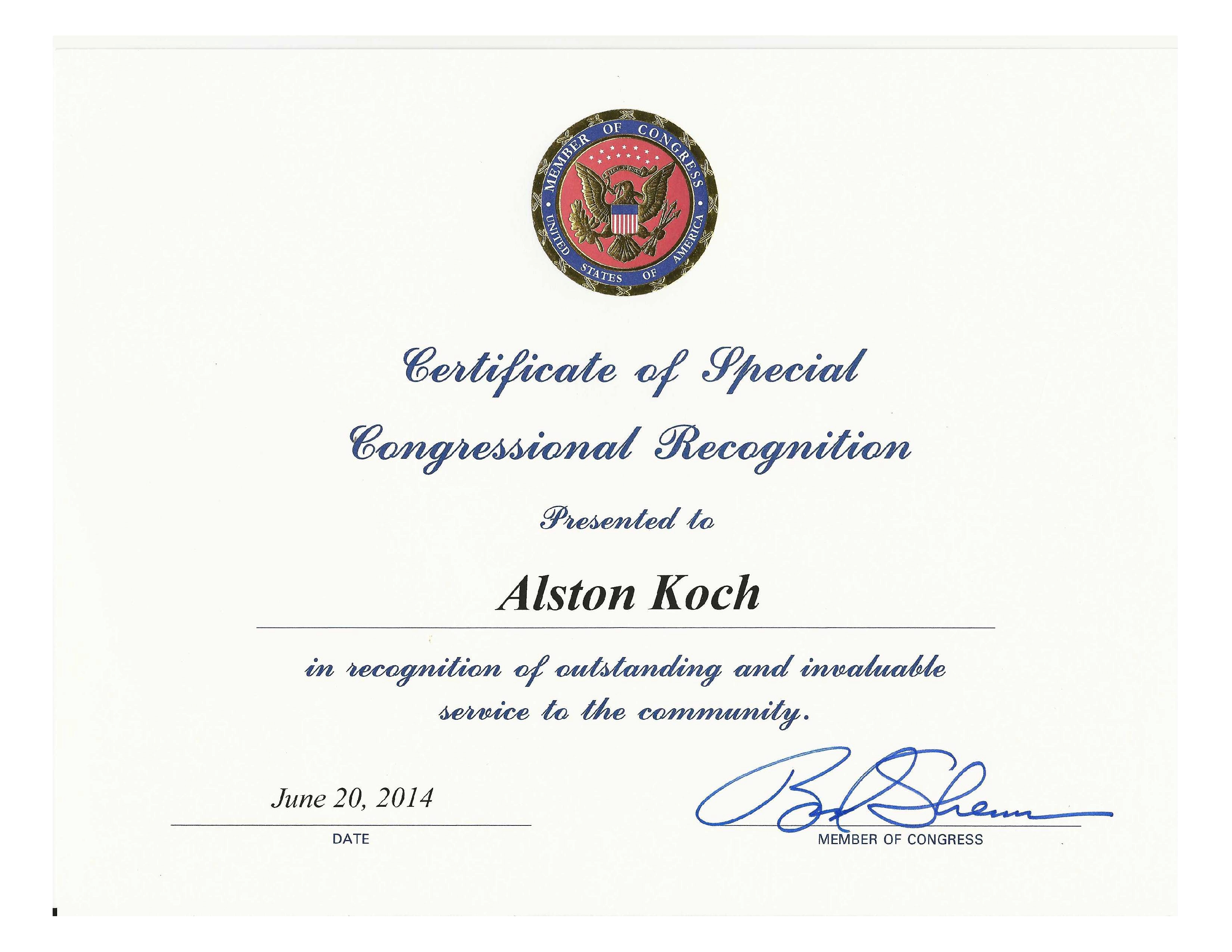
Certificate of Special US Congressional Recognition to Alston Koch

Since 2007, he has been the Ambassador for Tourism for Sri Lanka. In the same year, Koch wrote and performed an official song for the Sri Lankan cricketer Muttiah Muralitharan.

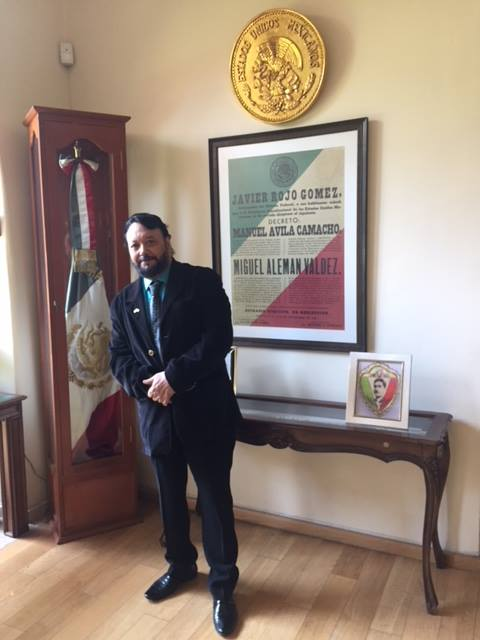
Koch at the President Miguel Alemán Valdés library just before the launch of his song, A Symphony for Change to raise awareness of the problems caused by plastic waste in the environment, on the World Environment Day which was celebrated in Mexico City on 5 June 2018.

In 2008, Koch wrote a song about climate change for a World Trade Organization presentation in London. The song was also presented by Geoffrey Lipman Chairman of ICTP to world leaders at the 'Live the Deal Climate Change' conference in Copenhagen. Koch was the goodwill ambassador for the campaign, and the song was promoted globally by ICTP in their campaign for green growth. Barbara Follett, a UK government minister, described it as a "gift in song to the world suffering due to climate change".

Koch has sung the national anthem at One Day International cricket matches and the Boxing Day Test. In 2009, he was appointed to the committee for the 2011 Cricket World Cup tournament staged in India, Sri Lanka and Bangladesh, and was the official goodwill ambassador for the tournament.

In 2010, he was inducted into the Hard Rock Hotel's Hall of Fame at a ceremony in Pattaya, Thailand, when the album, Kookaburra was installed on the venue's 'Golden Wall of Memorabilia'.

In April 2012 his latest album Don't Funk With Me, written and produced by Alston & the Sheriffs, debuted at No. 42 on the ARIA Top 50 Albums chart, eventually peaking at No.16. He became the first Australian artist to launch a single at an international cricket final when his song "Soul Sounds" (from Don't Funk with Me) was launched during the Australia vs. Sri Lanka final.

== Appointment as Envoy to Australia and the Pacific (2025) ==
In October 2025, Koch was appointed by the Commonwealth Union (CU) as its Envoy to Australia and the Pacific Region. In this role, he represents the CU in advancing the People’s Charter of the Commonwealth, focusing on regional collaboration, inclusivity, and sustainability.

Koch also serves as a Consultant to the CU, providing strategic and marketing support to expand its global digital outreach.

The appointment was announced by Nirj Deva, President of the CU, and acknowledged by Abdulla Shahid, President of the UN General Assembly.

== Discography ==
=== Singles ===
- "Don't Stop it Now" (written by Errol Brown) Koch and Dark Tan, [Living Sound Records](Channel 9) - AUS #100
- "Kings of Soul" (Written by Alston Koch & Dark Tan) RCA/Living Sounds (Channel 9 )
- "All the People Sing this Song" (written by Alston Koch and Darktan) [Laser]
- "Disco Lady" (written by Alston Koch and Chris Connelly) AUS #70
- "Island in the Sun" (Written by Alston Koch) RCA/Laser Records
- "Gimme That Banana" [RCA/Cinevox]Europe
- "Closer to the Phone" (RCA Records)
- "Vanishing Lady" (RCA Records)
- "Danny Boy" (RCA/Laser Records)
- "20 MILES" (Powderworks/EMI)
- "Kookaburra" [EMI]
- "Midnite Lady" (Written by Alston Koch /Alan Stirling) (EMI) Laser
- "Try Again" [EMI /Titanic) Aust. Mega (Scandinavia) EMI /SONET (U.K)
- "Never Felt This Way Before" [BMG/RCA]
- "With S-witch: I Want Your Love" [BMG/RCA] U.K
- "It's A Shame" (Written By Alston Koch) BMG/RCA Ariola
- "Sensual Motion" (Written by Alston Koch ) BMG/RCA Ariola
- "MURALI" (Written by Alston Koch & Jarred Wilson) Creative Vibes Records
- "Soul Sounds" feat The Sheriffs (Sony)
- "Don't Know Why" (Sony)Australia/Pacific & Rightrack Records (U.K)
- "Trees of Babylon" (Sony) Lifestyle

=== Albums ===
- After Darktan [RCA]
- Alston and the Freemantle Doctor [EMI] KOOKABURRA
- Move to the Rhythm (Alston Inc) BMG Crescendo (India & South East Asia)
- Don't Funk With Me [SME] Sony

=== Honours ===
Member of The Grammy Academy (U.S.A)
Member of The Australian Performing Right Association.(APRA)
Ambassador for Climate Change (I.C.T.P)
Ambassador for Sri Lanka Tourism
Member of PPCA (Performing & Publishing Copyright Association of Australia)
Member of AMCOS (Australasian Mechanical Copyright Organization)
Ambassador for FAMILY FILM AWARDS (USA) for Australia
Ambassador for The ARTS FOR PEACE FOUNDATION (U.S.A)
Award for the Global Entertainer of the Year 2018 - Ada Derana Sri Lankan of the Year.

== Filmography ==
- Lead Actor in the Film According to Mathew

Alston played the lead role opposite Bollywood star Jacqueline Fernandez.

- Executive Producer for Impact Earth, a Hollywood movie released worldwide in 2015 for Alta Vista Entertainment
- Associate Producer: The Road from Elephant Pass (2011)

== Gallery ==
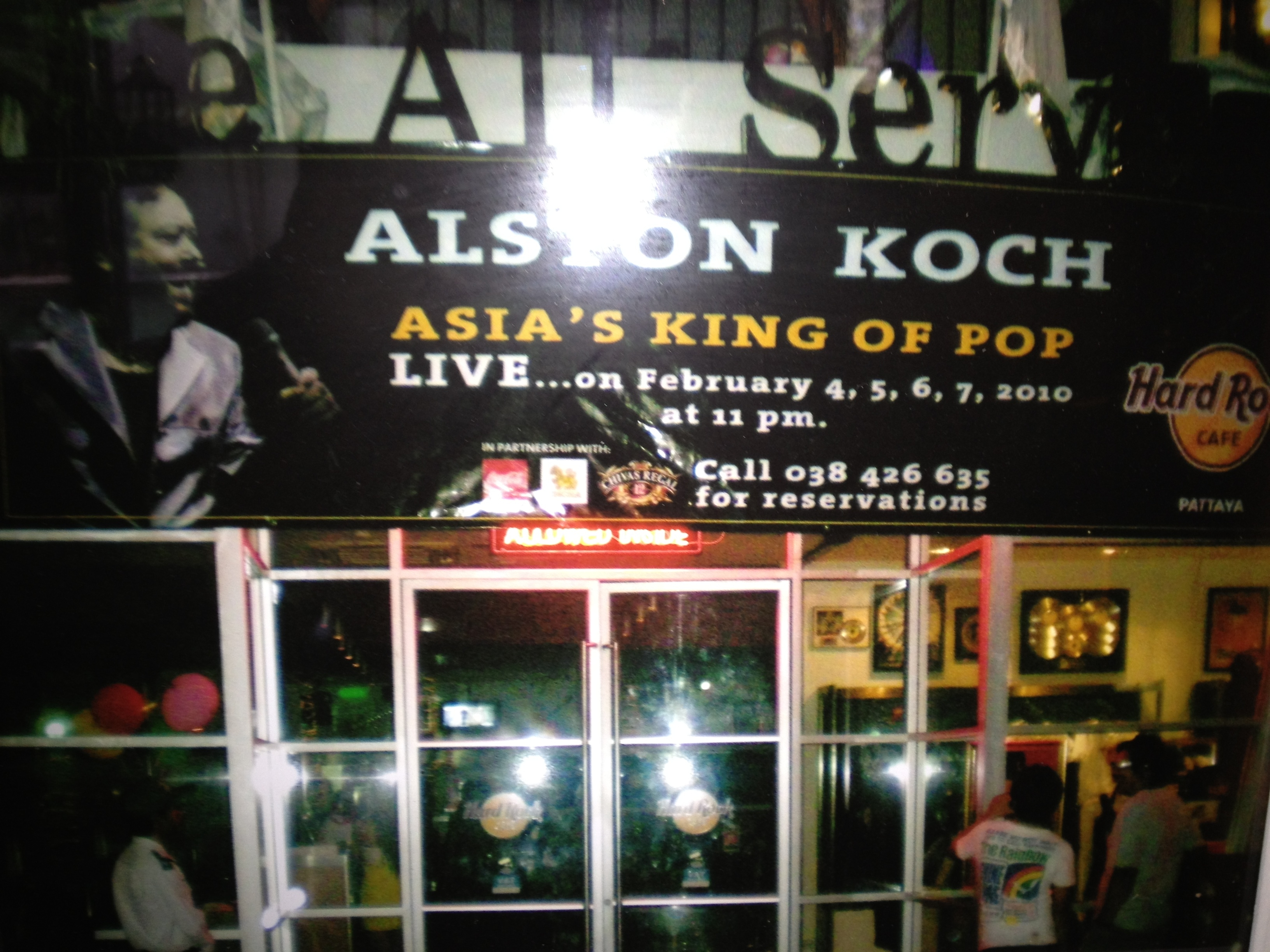
Koch is displayed on a banner in front of Hard Rock Cafe.

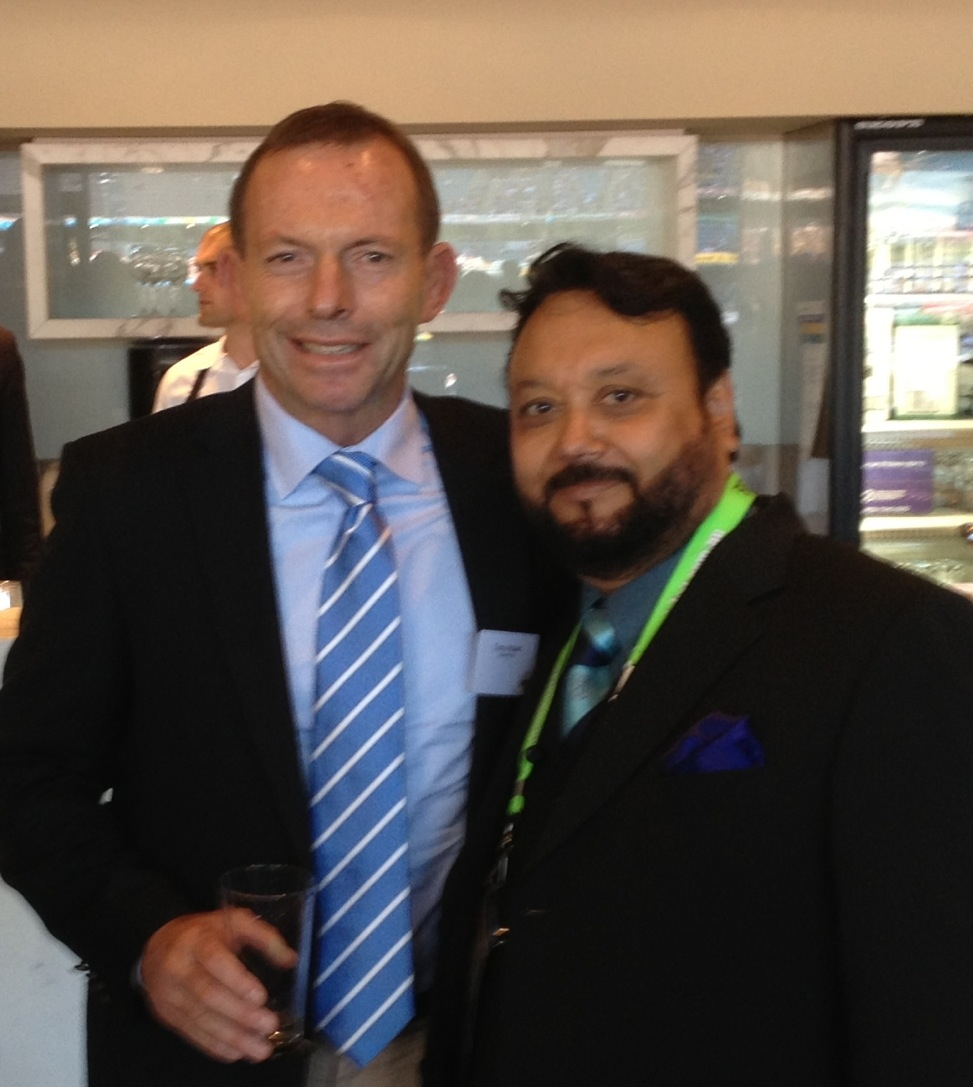
Koch is with Tony Abbott in 2012.

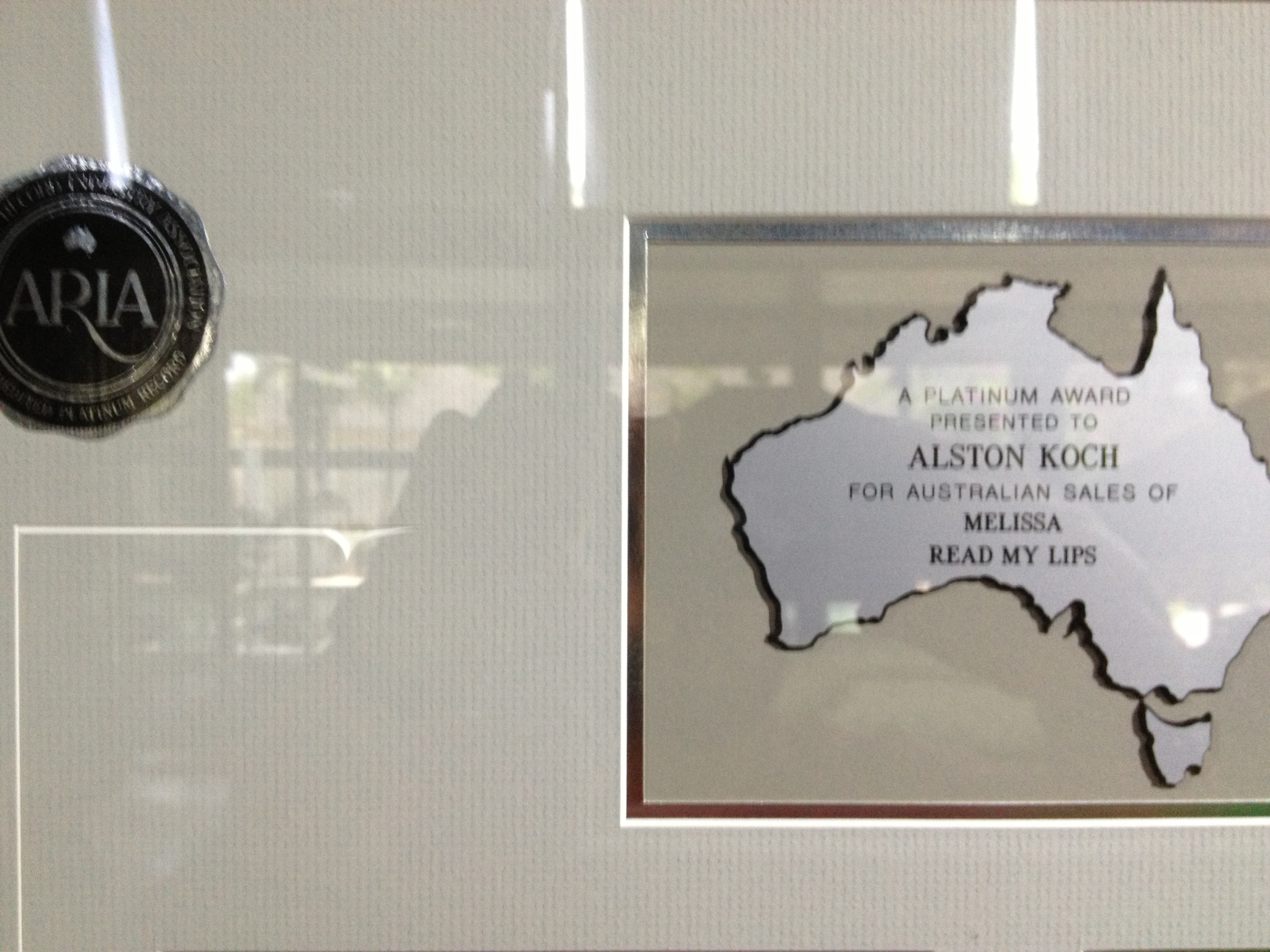
ARIA's Platinum Award for Alston Koch.

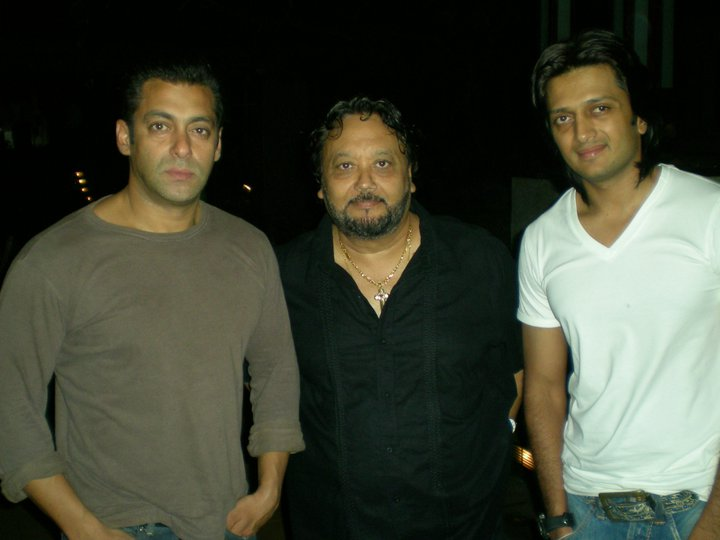
Koch is with Salman Khan and Riteish Deshmukh in Mumbai in 2011.

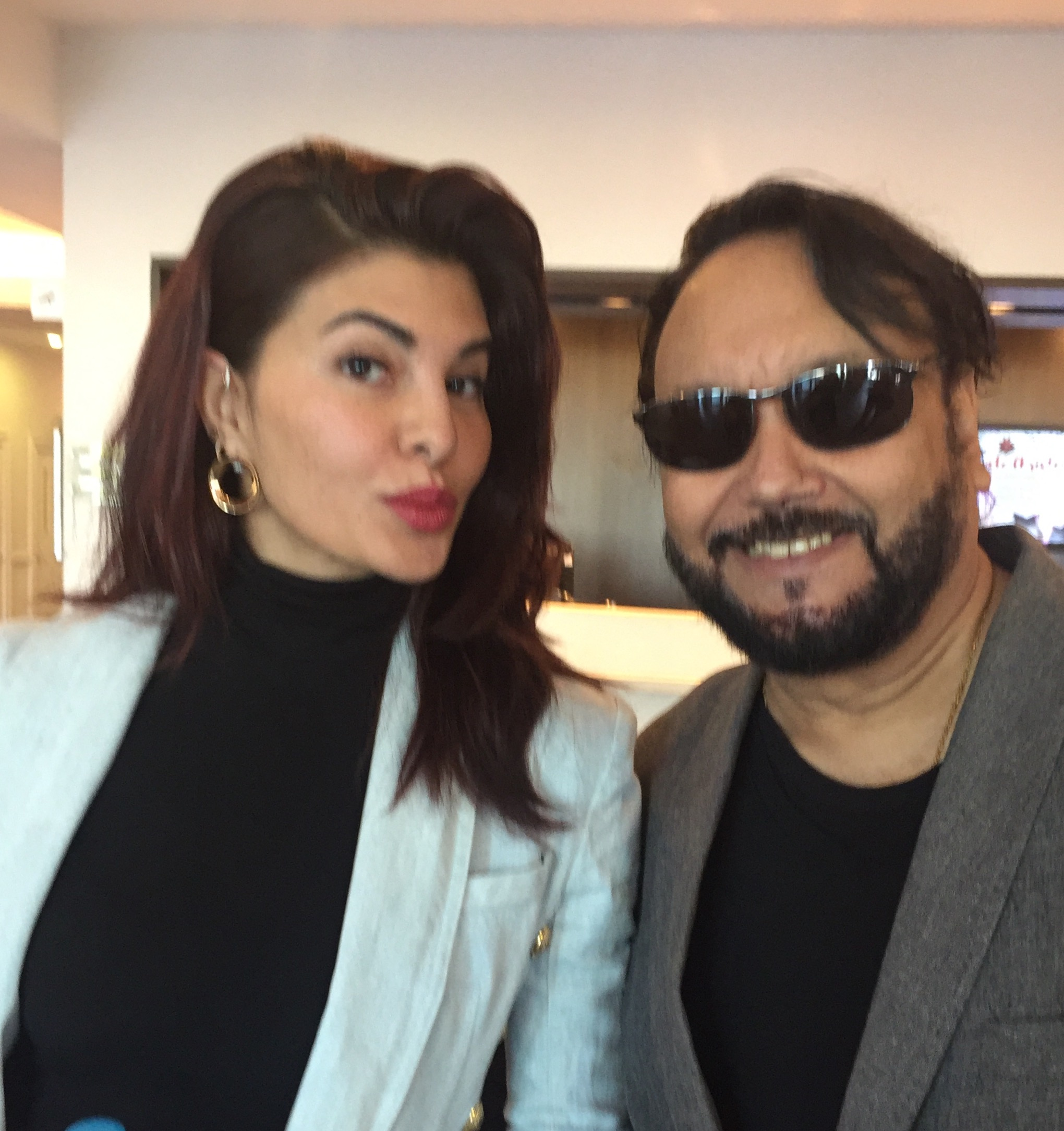
Koch is with Jacqueline Fernandez in 2017.
