= Kaushalya Fernando =

Sri Lankan actress and academic

Kaushalya Fernando කෞශල්‍යා ප්‍රනාන්දු
- Born: July 30, 1963 (age 63); Veyangoda
- Education: St. Paul's Girls School, Milagiriya
- Occupations: Actress, director
- Years active: 1979–present
- Spouse: Chandana Aluthge
- Children: 2
- Parent(s): Lionel Fernando; Somalatha Subasinghe
- Awards: Best Actress; Best Supporting Actress

Kaushalya Fernando (Sinhala: කෞශල්‍යා ප්‍රනාන්දු), is a Sri Lankan actress, director, producer and civil activist. Fernando is a five-time winner of the prestigious best actress award at the State Drama festival. She is the daughter of popular theatre director late Somalatha Subasinghe.

== Personal life ==
Kaushalya was born as the daughter of Lionel Fernando and Somalatha Subasinghe. Her father Lionel was a civil servant and former ambassador. Her mother Somalatha is a well-known dramatist and a theatre director. She has one sister. Her grandparents were teachers and lived in Veyangoda. She went to four schools, first Anula College, then Gothami Balika Vidyalaya and Sujatha College, finally St. Paul's Girls School, Milagiriya. Besides arts, she is an athletic champion, competing at the 100, 200 and high jump events at the district levels. She graduated from University of Colombo with an arts degree. At that time, she was invited to join the department as a trainee English instructor by Prof. Siromi Fernando. She accepted it and then continued with a postgraduate diploma in English language teaching. She left the profession as a permanent staff member in 1999 and continued as a visiting lecturer.

She is married to Dr. Chandana Aluthge and is a mother to twins, Haimi and Hans. Her husband is working at the University of Colombo at the Department of Economics.

== Acting career ==
She had the talent for theater from childhood, where she first wrote and directed stage plays at the age of 8 with the encouragement of her teacher, Sunethra Sarachchandra.

In 1979, Fernando experienced her first-ever stage role by accident as a last minute replacement in drama Punchi Apata Dang Therei directed by her mother and then a minor role in Vikurthi. Her major breakthrough was Sugathapala de Silva's play Marasad. For her role in the play, she won special acclaim at the State Drama Festival. This influenced other renowned directors such as Dharmasiri Bandaranayake, K.B. Herath, Ranjini Obeysekera and Premasiri Khemadasa to identify Kaushalya's abilities. In 1994 she acted in the play Antigony produced by her mother, where Kaushalya won the Best Actress award at the 1995 State Drama Festival. In 1995, she acted in the play Dona Kathirina. Her performance in this role was commended for winning the Best Actress award at the 1996 State Drama Festival.

In 2005 and 2009, she became one of handful of Sri Lankan artists to walk on the red carpet at the Mecca of world cinema - the Cannes Film Festival 2005 and 66th Venice Film Festival in 2009.

She has acted few television dramas, however, they become some memorable hits in Sri Lankan teledrama history. The serial Dunhinda Addara is her first acting teledrama. Later she acted in a number of teledramas including Diyaketa Pahana, Wanaspahti, Isuru Gira, Sedona and Thaththa. For the role in Dunhida Addara, she won the OCIC Best Actress Award as well.

=== Selected stage dramas ===
- Acid Wessa
- Aphrodite Mal Kollaya
- Bernardage Sipiri Geya
- Dhawala Bheeshana
- Kalumaali
- Marasad
- Moodu Puththu
- Punchi Apata Dang Therei
- Rahas Udaviya
- Sanda Langa Maranaya
- Vikurthi

== Beyond acting ==
Fernando and his husband currently work with the Playhouse for Children and Youth founded by her mother in 1981. This organization was later incorporated in the Parliament of Sri Lanka as Lanka Children's and Youth Theatre Foundation, Act No 3 of 2007. She was also worked as a lecturer on Drama and Arts at University of Performing Arts, Colombo and as an English teacher at the University of Sri Jayawardenepura. Kaushalya along with her husband produced a stage play for children, titled Walas Paula, written by her mother.

She has produced three theater dramas up to 2019. They are, Sanda Langa Maranaya, Maask and Dutu Thena Allanu. Sanda Langa Maranaya is an adaptation from Garcia Lorca's 'Blood Wedding'. Maask is an adaptation of Henrik Ibsen's ‘The Public Enemy', whereas Dutu Thena Allanu is an adaptation of Wole Soyinka's ‘Opera Wonyosi’.

She is a clever sitarist, and studied Indian classical singing, Kandyan and Low Country dance forms.

On 31 January 2019, Minister Mangala Samaraweera appointed a committee to initiate action to transform state media institutions to public broadcasting and television services, where Kaushalya was appointed as a member of that committee. However, on 28 February 2019, she resigned with three others from their respective positions.

== Awards and Accolades ==
- Sarasaviya Awards Best Supporting Actress – Sulanga Enu Pinisa - 2006
- Rotterdam Film Festival Tiger Award – Flying fish competed - 2011
- 47th Chicago International Film Festival – Flying fish screened - 2011
- Under Contemporary Asian Film series – Flying fish screened at the Museum of Modern Arts in New York from July 7 – 13, 2011 -
- Derana Film Awards Best Actress – Bora Diya Pokuna - 2016
- SAARC Film Festival Best Actress – Bora Diya Pokuna - 2016
- 52nd Pesaro International Film Festival – Special Jury Mention - Puthekuta - 2016
- Hiru Golden Film Awards Best Actress – Bora Diya Pokuna - 2016

== Filmography ==
Her first cinematic acting came through Asoka Handagama's Sanda Dadayama in 1996, however it is not yet screened in theaters. She rose to prominence and critically acclaimed through the films such as Sulanga Enu Pinisa, Bora Diya Pokuna and Akasa Kusum.

Year	Film	Role	Notes	Ref
1996	Sanda Dadayama		debut acting. not yet released	
2001	Me Mage Sandai			
2005	The Forsaken Land	Soma		
2009	Akasa Kusum	Mallika		
2010	Ira Handa Yata	Bhanu		
2011	Three Wheel Diaries			
2012	Mouse	Rangi		
2011	Igilena Maluwo			
2014	Death on a Noble Day	Jeewani	Short Film	
2015	Bora Diya Pokuna	Gothami		
2015	Elephant	Norma de Soysa	A short film	
2016	Puthekuta	Sunitha		
2017	Sulanga Gini Aran			
2017	Ali Kathawa	Bhanu		
2018	Goal	Village school principal		
2019	Thaala	Amarawathi		
2019	Dekala Purudu Kenek	Sachithra's Mother		
2019	Vishama Bhaga	Heen Manika		
2023	Kandak Sema			
2024	Minnu			
2025	Tentigo	Mother		
2025	Spying Stars	Nita Mother		
2025	Moda Tharindu	Gunawathi		
