= Sulanga Gini Aran =

Sulanga Gini Aran සුළඟ ගිනි අරන්
- official poster
- Directed by: Vimukthi Jayasundara
- Written by: Vimukthi Jayasundara
- Based on: Suranga De Alwis
- Produced by: Vimukthi Jayasundara
- Starring: Kaushalya Fernando; Mahendra Perera; Ruvin De Silva
- Cinematography: Channa Deshapriya; Dhanushka Gunathilake
- Edited by: Saman Alvitigala
- Music by: Lakshman Joseph De Saram
- Release dates: 2015 (Locarno); 17 March 2017 (Sri Lanka)
- Running time: 82 minutes
- Country: Sri Lanka
- Language: Sinhala

Sulanga Gini Aran (Dark in the White Light) (Sinhala: සුළඟ ගිනි අරන්) is a 2015 Sri Lankan Sinhala psychodrama film directed and produced by Vimukthi Jayasundara. It stars Kaushalya Fernando and Mahendra Perera in lead roles along with Ruvin De Silva and Steve De La Zilwa. Music composed by Lakshman Joseph De Saram. Though it premiered internationally in 2015, the film released in Sri Lanka in 2017. It is the 1271st Sri Lankan film in the Sinhala cinema.

The film has received mostly positive reviews from critics.

== International recognition ==
It was screened in many international film festivals such as Festival del film Locarno, and Dubai International Film Festival.

- Locarno International Film Festival 2015 - Nominated Golden Leopard
- TOKYO FILMeX 2015 - Jury Special Mention
- Festival des 3 Continents 2015 - Competition
- International Film Festival of Asian-Pacific countries in Vladivostok - Competition

== Plot ==
A Buddhist monk on a spiritual quest. A Student trying to test his limits. An organ dealer growing his business. A surgeon who heals by day and rapes women at night. The film interweaves various stories, on the threshold of pain, between life and death.

== Cast ==
- Steve De La Zilwa as Surgeon
- Ruvin De Silva as Monk
- Kaushalya Fernando
- Mahendra Perera as Human organ trafficker
- Suranga Ranawaka
- Bandula Vithanage
- Roshan Ravindra
- Sulochana Weerasinghe
- Thilakshini Rathnayake
- Samila Vidanage

== Awards ==
- 16th Tokyo FILMeX International Film Festival - Jury Special Mention
