= Premaya Nam =

Premaya Nam ප්‍රේමය නම්
- Theatrical release poster
- Directed by: Kalpana Ariyawansha; Vindana Ariyawansha
- Written by: Kalpana Ariyawansha; Vindana Ariyawansha
- Produced by: Kalpana Ariyawansha; Prem Dissanayake; Athula Mahawalage; Sujeewa Wijesinghe
- Starring: Shyam Fernando; Samanalee Fonseka; Suranga Ranawaka
- Cinematography: Jaan Shenberger
- Edited by: Kalpana Ariyawansha; Jaan Shenberger
- Music by: Rohana Weerasinghe
- Production company: East West Entertainment
- Distributed by: CEL Cinema Circuit
- Release dates: April 2015 (Beijing); 17 February 2017
- Country: Sri Lanka
- Language: Sinhala

Dirty, Yellow, Darkness (also known as Premaya Nam in Sri Lanka and certain Asian countries) (Sinhala: ප්‍රේමය නම්) is a 2017 Sri Lankan psychological drama film written and directed by Kalpana Ariyawansha and Vindana Ariyawansha. Produced by Kalpana Ariyawansha (under his banner East West Entertainment), Prem Dissanayake, Athula Mahawalage, and Sujeewa Wijesinghe. The film stars Shyam Fernando, Samanalee Fonseka in lead roles along with Suranga Ranawaka, Buddhadasa Vithanarachchi and Sathis Wijemanne in supportive roles. It is the 1270th Sri Lankan film in the Sinhala cinema.

The film portrays after his wife leaves, a man with a severe case of OCD, admits himself to a mental hospital for treatment to overcome his fear and to win his wife back. Rohana Weerasinghe composed the film's score and soundtrack. Kularatne Ariyawansa and Prasanna Vithanage are being as the executive producers in the film.

The first look was released in 5th Beijing International Film Festival 2015 and it has been selected as an official selection from Sri Lanka by 18th Shanghai International Film Festival 2015. The film had a local release on 17 February 2017.

== Plot ==
Vishwa (Shyam Fernando) is a director in an advertisement marketing company. Vishwa realizes that his mentality is somewhat abnormal from others. Vishwa stated his condition to Samadi, his wife (Samanalee Fonseka), before their marriage. After the marriage, his condition worsened, and he refuses to take his medicine. He starts to believe that when he pees, it will get all over him and his surroundings. So he wants to take a bath every time after he pees and wants to buy new clothes. He thinks that his old clothes have germs. With this condition, he gets troubled by his personal life and his professional career.

With bathing after each time urinating, he is noticed by his chief in charge of his working place. His close friends know his condition but his officer in charge doesn't know about his condition and that he is taking medicine. With resigning from the office, he stays at home with not taking medicine. Due to this condition, his wife Samadi leaves the house. In that point, he gets to know the depth of his mental condition and wants to live together with his wife again. Due to these reasons, he admits himself to a mental hospital for treatment to overcome his fear and to win his wife back.

== Cast ==
- Shyam Fernando as Vishwa
- Samanalee Fonseka as Samadi
- Suranga Ranawaka as Nurse Inoka
- Buddhadasa Vithanarachchi as Samadi's Father
- Nimal Jayasinghe as Vishwa's Father
- Prema Pathiraja as Vishwa's Mother
- Chandrika Hettiarachchi as Samadi's Mother
- Bibishana Kurera as Dayapala
- Ranjith Kadupitige as Priyantha
- Aruni Mendis as Nurse Nirupa
- S.I. Samarakkody as Asanga
- Sathis Wijemanne as Dr. Liyanage
- Chamanthi Wijemanne as Therapist Renuka
- Dileepa Abeysekera as Ravi
- Nalaka Gunawardene as Prof. Wijewardane
- Dulith Herath as Vishwa's Boss
- Kalana Gunasekara as Sumanarathna
- Ranjith Kadupitige as Priyantha

== Accolades ==
Award	Category	Recipient(s)	Result
2015 Beijing International Film Festival	Best Picture by a New Director	Kalpana Ariyawansha & Vindana Ariyawansha	Nominated
2015 Beijing International Film Festival	Best New Director	Kalpana Ariyawansha & Vindana Ariyawansha	Nominated
2015 Beijing International Film Festival	Best New Screenwriter	Kalpana Ariyawansha & Vindana Ariyawansha	Nominated
Cayman Islands International Film Festival 2016	Best First Film	Premaya Nam	Nominated
Chicago South Asian Film Festival 2016	Best Feature Film	Kalpana Ariyawansha & Vindana Ariyawansha	Nominated

=== Film festivals ===
- Beijing International Film Festival 2015 (In Competition - Forward Future)
- Shangai International Film Festival 2015 (Official Selection)
- International Film Festival of India, Goa 2015 (Official Selection)
- International Film Festival of Kerala 2015 (Official Selection)
- Palm Beach International Film Festival 2016 (Official Selection)
- London Indian Film Festival 2016 (Official Selection)
- Chicago South Asian Film Festival 2016 (In Competition)
- El Ojo Kojo International Film Festival, Madrid 2016 (Official Selection)
- Bengaluru International Film Festival 2016 (Asian Competition)
- Cayman Islands International Film Festival 2016 (Best First Film Competition)
- Delhi International Film Festival 2015 (Official Selection)
- International Film Festival of Colombo 2015 (In Competition)
- Jaffna International Cinema Festival 2015 (In Competition)
- Idyllwild International Festival of Cinema, California US 2017 (In Competition)
- Pune International Film Festival 2017 (Official Selection)

== Production ==
The film was shot in around the city Colombo and at National National Institute of Mental Health, Colombo, Sri Lanka. The shooting schedule of Premaya Nam began on 21 March 2013 and it ended on 21 April 2015.

== Soundtrack ==
No.	Title	Lyrics	Singer(s)	Length
1.	"Niwee Giya Sanda Pahana"	Sunil Ariyaratne	Dumal Warnakulasooriya
