= According to Matthew =

2018 English film directed by Chandran Rutnam

- Theatrical release poster
- Directed by: Chandran Rutnam
- Written by: Christie Eliezer; James Rutnam
- Produced by: Chandran Rutnam
- Starring: Alston Koch; Jacqueline Fernandez; Kian O'Grady; Bimsara Premaratna
- Cinematography: Chandana Jayasinghe
- Edited by: James Rutnam
- Music by: Morris Hayes
- Production company: Tabrobane Pictures
- Distributed by: US Distribution
- Release date: 24 November 2018 (Sri Lanka)
- Running time: 100 minutes
- Country: Sri Lanka/Australia
- Languages: English; Sinhala

According to Matthew is a Sri Lankan English-language crime thriller film produced and directed by Chandran Rutnam. It is based on the crimes of Father Mathew Pieris, Anglican priest of the Church of St. Paul the Apostle, Kynsey Road, Colombo 10, who was convicted of the double murders of his wife (Eunice Pieris) and Russel Ingram, the husband of his lover Dalrene Ingram, in 1979. The film stars Alston Koch and Bollywood actress Jacqueline Fernandez.

== Plot ==
Father Mathew Pieris is an Anglican priest who is famous in his hometown. One day, after the daily communion, his wife Eunice Pieris introduces a very young couple who joined their church to him. They are skilled sportsman Randy Reynolds and his vivacious newly wed wife Daphne Reynolds who used to be a typist and a telephone operator before marriage. Father Pieris in return introduces them to their Cricket Captain Steven who is learning in the Police Academy to become a Police Officer and befriends them. One evening, Father Pieris suggests Eunice that they should hire Daphne as his Secretary. They recruit her the next day and she starts work by typing the book Father Pieris was writing. They also provide her accommodation in their own home. Meanwhile Randy joins the Cricket team and often discuss how good Father Pieris is to them with Steven, saying how he helped them to achieve some financial stability during difficult times. One day, after the end of work, Daphne herself thanks Father Pieris and provocatively tells him if he needs anything, not to hesitate but to ask.

Father Pieris is renowned as an Exorcist in the town an often called by distraught parents when their children, specially teenage girls start to show abnormal behavior. One night after returning home late after inspecting one of the girls who were unresponsive to their parents, Father Pieris takes a sneak peek at naked Daphne who is wiping her hair after a shower. Frightened, Daphne covers herself with the towel while Father Pieris flees. Next morning, Father Pieris gently caresses Daphne's shoulder while she types and she reciprocates by closing their office room door. This triggers Father Pieris to close the curtains of the window and they kiss and have mutual oral sex. Sister June who was teaching a group of children adjacent to the office room sees that the door and window is closed and grows deeply suspicious.

Father Pieris insists Eunice to visit their children in London. In the same time, Randy is also often out of town for Cricket practices with Steven. One rainy night after returning home late again after performing an exorcism to another teenage girl, Father Pieris and Daphne knowing well that they are alone unleash themselves and have passionate sexual intercourse. Their daily sexual relations escalate to the point where Father Pieris decides he should get rid of those who are in-between them. Eunice hears rumours of their affair and starts worrying with her children in London. Meanwhile Randy falls seriously ill and is diagnosed with severe Hypoglycemia. Father Pieris and Daphne regularly visits him in the hospital and he gradually progresses buy his situation mysteriously deteriorates and he dies. Eunice returns home and she too mysteriously falls ill and is admitted to the hospital, only to be found out that she also is suffering from severe Hypoglycemia. Her situation betters and worsens between her stays with her family members and with Father Pieris. But her condition further deteriorates and she falls into a coma.

In the meantime, while on duty, Dr. Terrance who administered her Dextrose realizing that she does not respond to it seeks a second opinion from fellow colleague Dr. Mohan who identifies that he too had a similar case a few months ago, where a non-diabetic and severe hypoglycemic patient (Randy) also had the same treatment and he eventually died. At a hunch, they realizes that Father Pieris is related to both the patients and informs their suspicion to District Medical Officer Dr. Ferry who assigns Detective Cruse of the Criminal Investigation Department to investigate on the circumstantial evidence. During the investigations Eunice Pieris dies.

Distraught, and following testimonies from his girlfriend and her friends that Father Pieris is notorious for molesting young girls and newly wed women during communions, Steven decides to do his own investigation and surreptitiously obtains crucial scientific evidence which corroborates District Medical Officer and Detective Cruse's suspicions. Father Pieris is apprehended and is charged with double murder. During the trial, plaintiff proves beyond a reasonable doubt that Father Pieris systematically and intentionally administered Euglocon laced chicken and beef liver to both Randy Reynolds and Eunice Pieris, and the cause of the Deaths were not Pancreatic cancer as indicated by the defendant. Father Mathew Pieris is convicted and is sentenced to Death.

== Cast ==
- Alston Koch as Father Mathew Pieris
- Jacqueline Fernandez as Daphne Reynolds
- Kian O'Grady as Randy Reynolds
- Bimsara Premaratne as Eunice Pieris
- Ryan Wijayaratne as Steven
- Gavin Ludewyke as CID Detective Cruse
- Missari Ahil as Sebastian
- Uparna Premaratne as Sister June
- Prasad Pereira as Eardley (Eunice's brother)
- Anne Sackerdale as Randy's Mother
- Andre Perera as Doctor Terrence
- Eranga Ariyarathna as Doctor Mohan
- Ashok Ferrey as District Medical Officer
- Senaka Abeyratne as Doctor 1
- Lakshman Weerasena as Doctor 2
- Kumar Aththanayaka as Doctor 3
- Shanuki De Alwis as Head Nurse
- Saasha Karunarathne as Trainee Nurse
- Shyamila Fonseka as the girl who underwent exorcism
- Amandhi Caldera as Steven's Girlfriend
- Kalinga Indatissa as Prosecutor

== Production ==
It is the 1,316th film in Sri Lankan cinema. It was shot in Horana Kumbuke Mansion, where the actual events took place.

== Release ==
The film was scheduled to be released on 7 April 2017 in Sri Lanka, but was delayed to early 2018. It was screened on 24 November 2018 in CEL film theaters.

== See also ==
- Murders of Russel Ingram and Eunice Peiris
