= Nimnayaka Hudekalawa =

Nimnayaka Hudekalawa නිම්නයක හුදකලාව
- teaser poster
- Directed by: Boodee Keerthisena
- Written by: Chinthana Dharmadasa
- Produced by: Buddhi Keerthisena
- Starring: Saumya Liyanage; Sangeetha Weeraratne; Ravindra Randeniya
- Cinematography: Channa Deshapriya
- Edited by: Chandana Prasanna; Udara Weeraratne
- Music by: Lakshman Joseph De Seram
- Distributed by: CEL Theatres
- Release date: 19 May 2017
- Running time: 105 minutes
- Country: Sri Lanka
- Language: Sinhala

Nimnayaka Hudekalawa (Alone in a Valley) (Sinhala: නිම්නයක හුදකලාව) is a 2017 Sri Lankan Sinhala drama film directed by Boodee Keerthisena and produced by his father Buddhi Keerthisena. It stars Saumya Liyanage and Sangeetha Weeraratne in lead roles along with Samanalee Fonseka and Ravindra Randeniya. Music composed by Lakshman Joseph De Seram. It is the 1277th Sri Lankan film in the Sinhala cinema.

The film cited as the last outing of Tissa Abeysekera before his death.

== Plot ==
A creative director of an advertising agency going through an experience that he has never encountered. His wife being pregnant and waiting to give birth any moment, he has to be at office and sort out an urgent advertising campaign. While at the office he gets a phone call from his mother that wife is about to give birth and she is taking her to hospital. On his way to hospital, he encounters an experience. Through this experience he starts to fight with his desires and fears. He finally gets to the hospital and he experiences the unexpected.

- Boodee Keerthisena

== Cast ==
- Saumya Liyanage as Vishwa
- Samanalee Fonseka as Maya
- Sangeetha Weeraratne as Thaaraka
- Palitha Silva as Army Officer
- Sachini Ayendra as Advertising Executive
- Vimukthi Jayasundara as Vishwa's Friend
- Ravindra Randeniya as The Client
- Tissa Abeysekera as Mysterious Man
- Jayalal Rohana as Supermarket cashier
- Kingsly Rathnayake as Weather Man
- Lakshman Mendis as Hermit

== Soundtrack ==
No.	Title	Lyrics	Singer(s)	Length
1.	"Thatu Denavado"	Rohitha Jayalath	Jayasri
2.	"Patath Nati Rosath Aran"	Ajith Kumarasiri	Rosita Jesudasan
3.	"Karuppaana Rosa Aduththu (tamil)"	Ajith Kumarasiri	Rosita Jesudasan
