= Uresha Ravihari =

Sri Lankan playback singer and dancer

Uresha Ravihari උරේෂා රවිහාරි
- Born: Uresha Ravihari Wickremasinghe; 26 June 1982 (age 44); Nugegoda, Sri Lanka
- Education: Samudradevi Balika, Nugegoda; St. Paul's Girls School, Milagiriya
- Occupations: Singer; dancer
- Spouse: Hemantha Mudannayake
- Children: Sasen Pravivek
- Parents: Dharmasri Wickremasinghe (father); Chandra Wickremasinghe (mother)
- Relatives: Navod (brother)
- Awards: Best Singer
- Musical career
- Genres: Pop; soul; rhythm and blues; Indian classical music
- Instrument: Vocals
- Years active: 1989–present
- Labels: Nilwala; MEntertainment; Asian Music Group

Uresha Ravihari Wickremasinghe (born 26 June 1982; as උරේෂා රවිහාරී [Sinhala]) is a Sri Lankan singer. Considered one of the leading female playback singers in Sri Lankan Sinhala cinema, Ravihari has won numerous awards at local film and television festivals including Sarasaviya Awards for Best Vocalist in three consecutive years.

== Personal life ==
Uresha Ravihari was born on 26 June 1982 in Nugegoda. Her father Dharmasri Wickremasinghe is a renowned announcer at Sri Lanka Broadcasting Corporation (SLBC). Her mother is Chandra Wickremasinghe. Ravihari has one brother, Navod who is two years younger. She completed education from Samudradevi Balika Vidyalaya, Nugegoda, and then at St. Paul's Girls School, Milagiriya. She had talents for music as well as dancing.

She is married to Ruchira Nadeera, who is a doctor at Panadura Hospital. Wedding was celebrated in January 2012 at Galle Face Hotel. The couple has one son, Sasen Pravivek.

== Career ==
Her career begins at very little age where she used to listen music classes conducted by veteran singer Dr.Sujatha Attanayake at a neighbor house. Then she started to learn music and vocal train by attending to her classes. At the age of 8, she made her maiden playback singing with the film Shakthiya Obai Amme with her teacher Dr.Sujatha Attanayake and Tony Hassan.

At the age of 9, she released her first album, titled Surathal Nangiye. She continued perform many occasion with both Sinhala and Hindi songs and released Hindi- Sinhala mix CD/cassette at the age of 13 as her second album. She got the opportunity to sing Hindi songs in a musical program telecast on ITN on every Tuesday. Her third album, Kasun Tharaka was released when she was 16 years old.

At the age of 13, Ravihari made her debut acting in the film Malsara Doni produced by her father. In the film, her song Unna Eka Gangavaka became highly popularized. However she selected music industry as her pathway and completed 'Prathama' and the Diploma in Hindustani music under Sujatha Attanayaka and late Austin Munasinghe. She also completed 'Bharatha Natyam' under Preethi Ganegoda and Vasuki Shanmugampilla.

In 1996, Ravihari won the award for the best selling CD/cassette at Rasa Awards Festival for her album Sithin Man Aaderai. Then in 1998 she won the award for the best singer at Sumathi Awards for the song in the television serial Sasala Ruwa. In 2005, she won the best singer award at Raigam Tele'es for the song in serial Idorayaka Mal Pipila.

Apart from music and dancing, Ravihari completed a diploma in beauty culture under Suwineetha Kotalawala. In 2006, she won the Best singer award at both Signis OCIC Award Festival and Presidential Film Festival for the film Anjalika.

=== Television shows ===
Year	Title	Channel	Language	Role
2023-24	The Voice Kids(Season 1)	Sirasa TV	Sinhala	Coach – Herself

== Awards ==
- Best selling CD/cassette at Rasa Awards Festival 1996 - album Sithin Man Aaderai
- Best Vocalist at Sumathi Awards 1998 - television serial Sonduru Wasanthe
- Best Vocalist at Raigam Tele'es 2005 - television serial Idorayaka Mal Pipila
- Best Vocalist at Signis OCIC Award Festival 2006 - film Anjalika
- Best Vocalist at Presidential Film Festival 2006 - film Anjalika
- Best Vocalist at Sarasaviya Awards 2007 - film Rosa Kale
- Best Vocalist at Sarasaviya Awards 2008 - film Asai Man Piyabanna
- Best Vocalist at Derana Film Festival 2015 - film WarigaPojja
- Best Vocalist at Hiru Golden Film Festival 2018 - film Sarigama

== Playback singing ==
Year	Film	Notes
1989	Shakthiya Obai Amme	one song
1991	Salambak Handai	one song
1992	Malsara Doni	one song
1996	Hiru Sanduta Madivee	three songs
1997	Puthuni Mata Wasana	two songs
1998	Sathutai Kirula Ape	five songs
1998	Mohothin Mohotha	
1998	Sexy Girl	three songs
2000	Thisaravi	two songs
2001	Jack and Jill	
2001	Kumari Bambasara	four songs
2002	Magul Sakwala	two songs
2002	Surapurata Kanyaviyak	
2002	Somy Boys	one song
2003	Vala In London	three songs
2003	Aladinge Waldin	one song
2003	Numba Nadan Apita Pissu	two songs
2003	Sudu Salu	
2003	Aege Daivaya	two songs
2004	Diya Yata Gindara	one song
2004	Aadaraneeya Wassaanaya	one song
2004	Left Right Sir	three songs
2004	Ra Daniel Dawal Migel 3	one song
2004	Rajjumala	one song
2006	Dedunu Wessa	one song
2006	Nilambare	four songs
2006	Samaara	three songs
2006	Anjalika	three songs
2006	Sonduru Wasanthe	one song
2007	Sikuru Hathe	one song
2007	First Love Pooja	four songs
2007	Tharaka Mal	three songs
2007	Asai Man Piyabanna	one song
2008	Heart FM	one song
2008	Wada Bari Tarzan Mathisabayata	
2008	Rosa Kale	two songs
2008	Pitasakwala Kumarayai Pancho Hathai	one song
2008	Nil Diya Yahana	one song
2009	Ali Surathal	three songs
2009	Dancing Star	two songs
2009	Sir Last Chance	two songs
2009	Sinasuna Adaren	four songs
2009	Paya Enna Hiru Se	one song
2009	Juliya	one song
2010	Sudu Hansi	one song
2010	Uththara	two songs
2010	Mago Digo Dai	one song
2010	Suwanda Denuna Jeewithe	three songs
2010	Sara	one song
2010	Thank You Berty	one song
2011	Dhawala Pawura	two songs
2011	Challenges	one song
2011	Angara Dangara	one song
2011	Mahindagamanaya	two songs
2011	King Hunther	one song
2011	Selvam	one song
2012	Kusa Pabha	two songs
2012	Super Six	one song
2012	Sihinaya Dige Enna	two songs
2013	Peeter One	two songs
2013	Seetha Man Awa	two songs
2014	Siri Daladagamanaya	one song
2014	Wariga Pojja	one song
2014	Parapura	
2014	Kalpanthe Sihinayak	two songs
2015	Sanjana	one song
2015	Maharaja Ajasath	one song
2015	My Name Is Bandu	
2016	Paththini	one song
2016	Adaraneeya Kathawak	three songs
2016	Sarigama	five songs
2016	Ape Kaalaye Patachara	one song
2017	Appata Siri	one song
2017	Heena Hoyana Samanallu	one song
2017	Dedunu Akase	two songs
2017	Dr. Nawariyan	one song
2018	Adarei Man	five songs
2018	Wassanaye Sanda	one song
2019	Husma	one song
2020	Kabaddi (2021 film)	one song
2020	Miss Jenis	one song
2022	CineMa	one song
TBD	Uthuru Sulanga	

== Playback film tracks ==
Year	Film	Song	Note	Ref.
1989	Shakthiya Obai Amme	Podi Puthu Ipadunu Dine	with Sujatha Attanayake and Tony Hassan	
1991	Salambak Handai	Poojavo Jeewithe	with Latha Walpola	
1992	Malsara Doni	Unna Eka Gangawaka	with Angeline Gunathilake	
1996	Hiru Sanduta Madivee	Mal Muthulal	with Jagath Wickramasinghe	
1996	Hiru Sanduta Madivee	Wala Rodaka Petali		
1996	Hiru Sanduta Madivee	Wana Pethe Wana Wadule	with Gratien Ananda	
1997	Puthuni Mata Wasana	Me Wage Neda Api Denna		
1997	Puthuni Mata Wasana	Mage Lowe Mini Pahan	with Latha Walpola	
1998	Sathutai Kirula Ape	Re Yame Me Saadaye		
1998	Sathutai Kirula Ape	Paya Kasun Tharaka		
1998	Sathutai Kirula Ape	Sansara Sangeetha Raave	with Gratien Ananda	
1998	Sathutai Kirula Ape	Dese Obe Sene	with Gratien Ananda	
1998	Sathutai Kirula Ape	Mage Adara Wimaane	with Gratien Ananda	
1998	Sexy Girl	Mal Lokayen Piyabala	with Ananda Perera	
1998	Sexy Girl	Mithuro Oba Sema Mage		
1998	Sexy Girl	Hasarali Pavee Rangamadale	with Gratien Ananda	
2000	Thisaravi	Wikasitha Nayane Pethum	with Gratien Ananda	
2000	Thisaravi	Sanda Kirane Mudu Suwaya		
2001	Kumari Bambasara	Enna Piyamba Ithin	with Wilbert Anthony	
2001	Kumari Bambasara	Dilisei Es Obe		
2001	Kumari Bambasara	Dangakara Me Rella	with Dayaratne Perera	
2001	Kumari Bambasara	Raththaran Mage Pethum		
2001	Jack and Jill	Mal Mal Sihine Kumareku Inne		
2002	Magul Sakwala	Adare Madhu Bindu Onedo	with Gratien Ananda	
2002	Magul Sakwala	Sendewa Ananda Me	with Gratien Ananda	
2002	Somy Boys	Ma Andure Thanivee Sitina	with Gratien Ananda	
2003	Vala In London	Pedila Pina Pedila	with Ishak Beg	
2003	Vala In London	Handa Wage Hada Mage	with Gratien Ananda	
2003	Vala In London	Ninden Sihinen	with Gratien Ananda	
2003	Aladinge Waldin	Sihine Wage	with Kithsiri Jayasekara	
2003	Numba Nadan Apita Pissu	ABCD	with Champa Kalhari, Sangeeth Wickramasinghe	
2003	Numba Nadan Apita Pissu	Soya Piyambala	with Champa Kalhari, Sangeeth Wickramasinghe	
2003	Aege Daivaya	Hasareli Pamin Rangamadale		
2003	Aege Daivaya	Re Game Sonduru Ru Siri		
2004	Diya Yata Gindara	Sili Sili Sili Siliye	with Gratien Ananda	
2004	Aadaraneeya Wassaanaya	Heenayaki Mata Adare	with Kasun Kalhara	
2004	Left Right Sir	Wennati Oba Edath Pemwathi	with Gratien Ananda	
2004	Left Right Sir	Adara Wassak	with Gratien Ananda	
2004	Left Right Sir	Pemkala Chamara Sala Salaa	with Gratien Ananda	
2004	Ra Daniyel Dawal Migel 3	Sandawage Lassanai	with Nuwan Gunawardana	
2004	Rajjumala	Mal Muwarada Sali Salee	with Deepika Priyadarshani, Arosha Samaradiwakara	
2006	Dedunu Wessa	Dedunu Wessa Wahi	with Gratien Ananda	
2006	Nilambare	Pawane Igili Me Nilambare	with Kingsly Peiris	
2006	Nilambare	Mal Mal Piyali Sale		
2006	Nilambare	Soya Soya Unnemi	with Kingsly Peiris	
2006	Nilambare	Sanda Nil Walawe	with Kingsly Peiris	
2006	Samaara	Punchi Bimmal Pipila		
2006	Samaara	Sandatath Res Iren Labi	with Gratien Ananda	
2006	Samaara	Diya Binden Sali	with Leslie Thomas	
2006	Anjalika	Pamavee Pipuna Mal Suwandai	With Kasun Kalhara, Nelu Adhikari	
2006	Anjalika	Paayana Ira Paana Kaage		
2006	Anjalika	Sanda Eliya Nela	with Gratien Ananda	
2006	Sonduru Wasanthe	Dakina Dakina Siyalu Wele	with Sangeeth Wickramasinghe	
2007	Tharaka Mal	Seetha Nille Hamana Sisile		
2007	Tharaka Mal	Kelle Sudu Kelle	with Janaka Gunaratne, Nelu Adhikari	
2007	Sikuru Hathe	Nilata Nile Nil Keteta	with Kasun Kalhara	
2007	First Love Pooja	Ma Obei Samada Adarei	with W. Premaratne	
2007	First Love Pooja	Nil Nuwan Mal Wage	with Sisira Bandara	
2007	First Love Pooja	Ranchu Vihagun Jodu	with Nuwan Gunawardana	
2007	First Love Pooja	Ane Seetha Devi	with Nuwan Gunawardana	
2007	Asai Man Piyabanna	Samanal Hanguman Athare		
2008	Heart FM	Koheda Sneha Parthana	with Kasun Kalhara	
2008	Pitasakwala Kumarayai Pancho Hathai	Sihilal Sagara Tharanga	with Leslie Thomas	
2008	Rosa Kale	Walakukata Pawennata		
2008	Rosa Kale	Randam Wage	with Amila Perera	
2008	Nil Diya Yahana	Sundarai Kodewwama	with Iman Perera	
2009	Ali Surathal	Me Sande Pawanelle	with Nuwan Gunawardana	
2009	Ali Surathal	Nil Kandutheere Surangana	with Nuwan Gunawardana	
2009	Ali Surathal	Sandaluthalen Maha Polowata	with Nuwan Gunawardana, Sudesh Wasantha Peiris	
2009	Dancing Star	Jeewithe Ridmayai	with Bathiya and Santhush, Ashanthi De Alwis, Umara Sinhawansa; Amila Perera, Shihan Mihiranga, Dushyanth Weeraman	
2009	Dancing Star	Des Piyan	with Sachith Peiris, Bathiya Jayakody, Umara Sinhawansa, Randhir Witana	
2009	Sir Last Chance	Awe Na Kiya	with Sangeeth Wickramasinghe, Sangeeth Wijesuriya	
2009	Sir Last Chance	Ajare Ajare	with Sangeeth Wijesuriya	
2009	Sinasuna Adaren	Walakulak Aeth Maeth Karala		
2009	Sinasuna Adaren	Mal Dewata Dige	with Gratien Ananda	
2009	Sinasuna Adaren	Sanda Mage Obai	with Gratien Ananda	
2009	Sinasuna Adaren	Epa Sande Raashi	with Gratien Ananda	
2009	Paya Enna Hiru Se	Ranin Opalu	with Amila Perera	
2009	Juliya	Rathangili Nalawana	with Kasun Kalhara	
2010	Sudu Hansi	Seda Pihatuwa		
2010	Uththara	Ahasa Handuwa Ira Handa	with Pradeep Rangana	
2010	Uththara	Keewa Sulanga Mata Keewa	with Santhush Weeraman	
2010	Mago Digo Dai	Desa Manel Mal Athirille	with Gratien Ananda	
2010	Suwanda Denuna Jeewithe	Mal Samanallu		
2010	Suwanda Denuna Jeewithe	Ron Suwanda Dena	with Shihan Mihiranga	
2010	Suwanda Denuna Jeewithe	Sith Mal Hangum	with Shihan Mihiranga, Iresha Otum, Billy Fernando, Ruwan Hettiarachchi	
2010	Sara	Mal Muwarada	with Amal Perera	
2010	Thank You Berty	Chuttan Battichchi	with Sangeeth Wijesuriya	
2011	Dhawala Pawura	Sinawak Detholaga Kathawak	with Jananath Warakagoda	
2011	Dhawala Pawura	Sili Siliye Pavan	with Nuwan Gunawardana	
2011	Challenges	Eka Fantasy Heeneka	with Leslie Thomas	
2011	Angara Dangara	Seetha Meedum Kanduthire		
2011	Mahindagamanaya	Sansare Me Bara	with Karunarathna Divulgane	
2011	Mahindagamanaya	Samindu Wadinawa Bo		
2011	King Hunther	Siki Pilase	with Nalin Perera	
2011	Selvam	Nidahase		
2012	Kusa Pabha	Madhura Wasanthe	with Nirosha Virajini, Harshana Dissanayake; Bandula Wijeweera, Mahinda Pathirage	
2012	Kusa Pabha	Jala Dharawe		
2012	Super Six	Susumata Susumak	with Sankha Dineth	
2012	Sihinaya Dige Enna	Sulagak Vee Awidin	with Dumal Warnakulasuriya	
2012	Sihinaya Dige Enna	Uyanakya Mal Pipunu		
2013	Peeter One	Lassana Malakata Nowasa	with Kumara Samarasinghe	
2013	Peeter One	Sanda Se Hiru Se		
2013	Seetha Man Awa	Vichithra Pavithra Adare	with Mario Ananda	
2013	Seetha Man Awa	Ayubowan Ayubowan	with Rodney Warnakula, Ajith Premalal; Isuru Kondasinghe, Dhammika Banneheka	
2013	Siri Daladagamanaya	Anothathaye Suwanda Vilen		
2013	Wariga Pojja	Rukan Pojje Pipimal Pojjata	with Ananda Perera	
2014	Kalpanthe Sihinayak	Nil Nethu Nilupul	with Ranjan Saliya	
2014	Kalpanthe Sihinayak	Dura Eatha Sulangeda	with Udaya Sri	
2015	Sanjana	Rosa Malin Amunala	with Gratien Ananda	
2015	Maharaja Ajasath	Sath Paata Galwa		
2015	My Name Is Bandu	Pawi Enu Mena	with Bandu Samarasinghe	
2015	My Name Is Bandu	Mal Manamali	with Buddhika Ushan	
2016	Paththini	Sudo Sudu	with Kasun Kalhara	
2016	Adaraneeya Kathawak	Ahasin Eha	with Kasun Kalhara	
2016	Adaraneeya Kathawak	Me Obata Ahenawada	with Kasun Kalhara	
2016	Adaraneeya Kathawak	Sithuwili Pura		
2016	Sarigama	Me Kandu Pela		
2016	Sarigama	Pihatuwak Do Maa		
2016	Sarigama	Samanalayin Paata Paata		
2016	Sarigama	Api Gayamu		
2016	Sarigama	Wenadata Nokiyana	with Edward Jayakody	
2016	Ape Kaalaye Patachara	Madhura Sara Sanda	with Mohan Dharshana	
2017	Appata Siri	Oba Wenwu Daa Idala		
2017	Heena Hoyana Samanallu	Sanda Naewidin Ahasata		
2017	Dedunu Akase	Bhawayen Bhawe	with Mihindu Ariyaratne	
2017	Dedunu Akase	Mal Kalamba female version		
2017	Dr. Nawariyan	Mada Pawanellak Se	with Hector Dias	
2018	Adarei Man	Thurulu Wee Lagin	with Victor Rathnayake	
2018	Adarei Man	Neela Guwan Thale	with Victor Rathnayake	
2018	Adarei Man	Oba Enna Mage Hiru	with Victor Rathnayake	
2018	Adarei Man	Senehase Diya Isa	with Victor Rathnayake	
2018	Adarei Man	Susum Kadulali Tharanaye	with Victor Rathnayake	
2018	Wassanaye Sanda	Asirimath Wu Premaye		
2019	Husma	Awarin Nagena		
2020	Miss Jenis	Ran Tharaka Langin		
