= Aponsu =

Aponsu is a surname from Sri Lanka. Notable people with the surname include:

- Awanthi Aponsu (born 1959), Sri Lankan actress
- Chrishen Aponsu (born 1994), Sri Lankan cricketer
- Jayasekara Aponsu (born 1951), Sri Lankan actor, director, and writer
