= Raigam Tele'es Best Teledrama Supporting Actor Award =

The Raigam Tele'es Best Teledrama Supporting Actor Award is presented annually in Sri Lanka by the Kingdom of Raigam associated with many commercial brands for the best Sri Lankan supporting actor of the year in television screen.

The award was first given in 2005. Following is a list of the winners of this prestigious title since then.

== Award list in each year ==
Year	Best Supporting Actor	Teledrama	Ref.
2004			
2005			
2006	Sarath Chandrasiri	Wasantha Kusalana	
2007	Tissa Abeysekara	Uthuwankande Saradiel	
2008			
2009	Ranjith Silva	Isuru Bhawana	
2010	Mahendra Perera		
2011	Athula Pathirana	Swayanjatha	
2012	Dasun Pathirana	Ahasin Watuna	
2013	Kumara Thirimadura	Sandaa	
2014	Mahendra Perera	Chess	
2015	Gihan Fernando	Daskon	
2016	Lakshman Mendis	Maddahana	
2017	Ananda Kumara Unnahe	Badde Kulawamiya	
2018	Kalana Gunasekara	Koombiyo	
2019	Xavier Kanishka	Veeraya Gedara Awith	
2020	Anjana Premaratne	Thanamalvila Kollek	
2021	Samitha Sudeeshwara	Pork Veediya	
2024	Sarath Kothalawala	Viyali	
