= De Mazenod =

De Mazenod may refer to:

- Eugène de Mazenod (1782-1868), French Catholic clergyman
- De Mazenod College, a Catholic school in Kandana, Sri Lanka, managed by the De La Salle Brothers
