= Sumathi Merit Awards =

The Sumathi Merit Awards are presented annually in Sri Lanka by the Sumathi Group of Companies associated with many commercial brands to uplift the talent of Sri Lankan actors and actresses, as well as technical crew who gained positive reviews from critics for their role in television screen.

The award was first given in 1995. The following is a list of the winners of these awards since 1995.

== Awards ==
Year	Award winner	Teledrama / Program
1995	Sumudu Gunasekara	Pilima Wahanse
1995	Yashoda Wimaladharma	Punchi Kumarihami
1995	Dayarathne Perera	Eka Gei Kurullo
1995	Veenavi Mapitigama	Devani Guruwari
1995	Anura Chandrasiri	Makara
1995	Hiroshima Perera	Kumarayaneni
1996	Saumya Liyanage	Kalpanthyak
1996	Frank Pushpanayagam	Maruwala
1996	Chandra Kaluarachchi	Arharadaaruwa
1996	H. A. Perera	Sura Asura
1996	Roger Seneviratne	Nadunana Puththu
1996	Amiththa Weerasinghe	Sangili Paalama
1997	Priya Ranasinghe	Ammai Thaththai
1997	Ananda Wickramage	Patalavilla
1997	Premasiri Kalpage	Weda Hamuduruwo
1998	Chandra Kaluarachchi	Vilambheetha
1998	Channa Perera	Thimira Pauwa
1998	Pujitha de Mel	Vilambheetha
1999	Athula Ransirilal	Hasarali Rasaara
1999	Nalin Pradeep Udawela	Nisala Wila
1999	Ravindra Yasas	Aul Haraya
2000	Rathnawali Kekunawela	Warna Kambili
2000	Igneshas Gunaratne	Warna Kambili
2000	Raja Sumanapala	Hathe Wasama
2000	Rangana Premaratne	Kada Muuna
2000	Shirantha Premawardena	Kana Kok Suda
2001	Gayana Sudharshani	Magul Sakwala
2001	Nayana Kumari	Weli Katharata Aluth Irak
2001	Somaweera Gamage	Dakathi Muwahatha
2001	Jayalal Rohana	Ekata Gatuma
2001	Ananda Athukorale	Pinthaliye Siddhi
2001	Priyankara Rathnayake	Abhisamaya
2002	Gamini Hettiarachchi	Oru Bandi Siyambalawa
2002	Wimal Alahakoon	Hemanthaye Wasanthaya
2002	Rohani Weerasinghe	Diya Sewanali
2002	Samson Kumarage	Hapana
2002	Sasanthi Jayasekara	Ek Murganganaviyak
2002	Athula Ransirilal	Bahai Kiyala Baha
2002	Kanchana Mendis	Sathi Pooja
2003	Indrajith Navinna	Ambu Daruwo
2003	Sarath Chandrasiri	Asani Wasi
2003	Edward Gunawardena	Mudawaapu Kirilli
2006	Nirosha Perera	Nil Ahasa Wage
2006	Athula Pathirana	Jeevithayata Ida Denna
2006	Sarath Namalgama	Sihinayak Paata Paatin
2007	Sirasa Superstar	Sirasa TV reality program
2007	Sarala Kariyawasam	Water Bollywood film
2007	ITN Ran Tharu	Independent Television Network reality program
2007	Vijaya Nandasiri	-
2008	Asoka Handagama; Hilmi Ahamath	Nagenahira Weralin Asena script
2008	Gaya Prema Alwis	Induwara producer
2008	Thusitha de Silva; Somaweera Senanayake	Paramitha script
2009	Wasantha Dukgannarala	Obai Ape Deyyo
2009	Nilan Cooray	SMS
2009	Anuruddhika Padukkage	Kampitha Vila
2009	Awanthi Aponso	Handewa
2009	Sunil Costa	Sherlock Holmes
2009	Nirosh Abeysinghe	Montisori
2009	Sherly P. Delankawala	Handewa
2010	Mauli Fernando	Arungal
2010	Gamini Ambalangoda	Ridee Ittankaraya
2010	Oshadi Hewamadduma	Sinidu Piyapath
2010	Ajith Lokuge	Sihina Sappuwa
2010	Dhananjaya Siriwardena	Sithaka Mahima
2010	Sarath Chandrasiri	Sandata Aruthak
2011	Giriraj Kaushalya	Thaksalawa
2011	Pradeep Dharmadasa	Ayaal
2011	Suraj Mapa	Degammadiyawa
2011	Gamini Jayalath	Pinibara Yamaya
2011	Rangana Seneviratne	Wadapitiya political program
2011	Paboda Sandeepani	Wajira Pani
2011	Udayanthi Kulatunga	Degammadiyawa
2012	Ryan Van Rooyen	Kada Dora
2012	Sanjeewa Balasuriya	Yaathra program
2012	Binodi Sammani	Rawana Adaviya program
2012	Kumara Thirimadura	Athkada Lihiniya
2012	Semini Iddamalgoda	Ithin Mata Awasarai
2013	Dasun Pathirana	Ahasin Watuna
2013	Priyantha Sirikumara	Me Wasantha Kalayay
2013	Senuri Wakishta	Ahasin Watuna
2013	Nethma Umali Adikari	Isiwara Sanakeli
2013	Janaka Jayakody	Mata Asai Mata Kiyanna
2013	Lilantha Kumarasiri	Muthu Pihatu
2013	Jayani Senanayake	Me Wasantha Kalayay
2014	Indunil Dasanayake	-
2014	Uddika Premarathna	Hopalu Arana
2014	Jehan Srikanth	Boralu Para
2014	Wilman Sirimanna	Agni
2014	Asoka Senarath Mudali	-
2014	Buddhika Jayaratne	Amuthu Minissu
2014	Nishantha Jayawickrama	Manusath Uyana
2015	Udaya Shantha	Wae Diya Rella
2015	Volga Kalpani	Colamba Ahasa
2015	Richard Abeywardena	Piththala Konderuma
2015	Suresh Gamage	Ritigala Ahasa
2015	Vinoja Nilanthi	Makulu Del
2016	Madhavi Wathsala	Daskon
2016	Mahinda Kumara Dalupotha	Thawalamen Katharagamata presenter
2016	Himali Sayurangi	Kaviya Numba
2016	Lal Kularatne	Theertha Tharanaya
2016	Udaya Shantha; Chathura Alwis	Travel With Chathura adventure program
2017	Nirosha Thalagala	Nattukkarayo
2017	Kumara Thirimadura	Nattukkarayo
2017	Priyantha Sirikumara	
2018	Ashen Manjula	Diya Mankada
2018	Vasanthi Ranwala	Mathu Sambandai
2018	Jayaprakash Sivagurunathan	Eka Gei Minissu
2019	Yureni Noshika	Koombiyo
2019	Richard Abeywardena	Uththama Purusha
2019	Deepani Silva	Sanhinda Pamula
2021	Sarath Chandrasiri	Ado
2021	Dananji Tharuka	Susumaka Ima
2021	Saddha Mangala Sooriyabandara	Amuthu Rasikaya
2021	Volga Kalpani	Husma Watena Mal
2021	Kanishka Xavier	Weeraya Gedara Awith
