= Bathiya and Santhush =

Sri Lankan hip hop duo

BnS
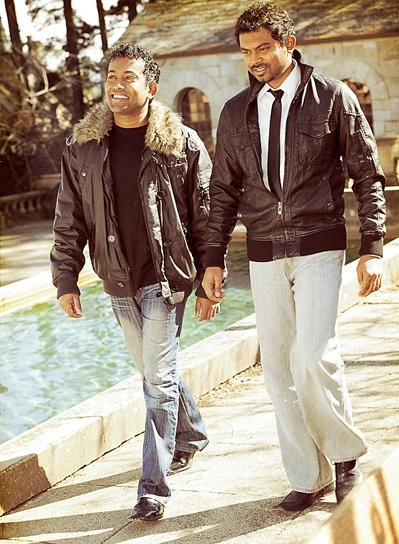
- Bathiya Jayakody (left) & Santhush Weeraman (right) in 2010 during the filming of the Sara Sihina Music Video.

Background information
- Origin: Colombo, Sri Lanka
- Genres: Hip hop, folkhop, electrohop, crunk
- Years active: 1998–present
- Labels: Torana Music, M-Entertainment, SGMTunes, Sony BMG, Universal Music
- Members: Bathiya Jayakody; Santhush Weeraman
- Website: www.bnsmusic.com

Bathiya & Santhush (Sinhala: භාතිය හා සන්තුෂ්), also known as BnS, are a Sri Lankan pop duo consisting of Bathiya Jayakody (born on 22 December 1976) and Santhush Weeraman (born on 5 September 1977), who met at a scout jamboree in Colombo. Both were born in Colombo, Sri Lanka. They have been one of the most commercially successful music acts in Sri Lanka in the last two decades.

Bathiya Jayakody was educated at Ananda College, Colombo while Santhush Weeraman was educated at Royal College, Colombo.

Since the inception of their act in 1998, they have over 50 number-one hit singles, six platinum selling mainstream albums, four commercially successful EPs and countless movie soundtracks. BNS are one of the biggest musical acts to hit the Sri Lankan musical scene since the 1990s, mixing Sinhala, Tamil, and English rap verses in their originals, while they have also mixed Hindi rap verses in their folkhop remixes,. BNS became the only Sri Lankan hip hop act to feature Indian singers, namely Hariharan (in the song "Yalpaname"), Asha Bhosle (in the song "Dedunna Sedi") and Sonu Nigam (in the song "Aa Chale").

Having performed in concerts in Sri Lanka and abroad, BnS marked significant success with their own concert tour series "Neththara Live" with 120 concerts (2005–2008), "Shaheena Live" 40 concerts (2009–2011), "Sarasihina Live" 150 concerts (2011–2014), "BNS Up Close & Personal" 50 Concerts (2015–2018) and "Oba Nisa – Celebrating 20 Years of Music", which was launched in 2019.

== Career ==
=== Academic career ===
Bathiya started his education in Holloway Primary School in India and upon return in 1984, he entered Isipathana College, Colombo for a brief period. In 1988, he joined Ananda College, Colombo, Santhush studied at Royal College, Colombo. Both of them were scouts and they met in 1992 at Viharamahadevi Park in Colombo during a scouting jamboree, where they both sang.

=== Early musical journey ===
While studying western classical music privately, Bathiya was a member of the first Ananda College Senior Brass Band where he played the alto saxophone and occasionally filled in for the percussion section. He was also a pianist with the western music society. He was a founding member and a lead vocalist of the school band. Winning many awards at inter school competitions, Bathiya soon became a known figure in the school's music circuit as a college musician during the mid-90s. He later started learning the music technology with the Sri Lankan music artist Dilup Gabadamudalige. He also joined the Marry Anne Singers Colombo. Bathiya and Santhush studied opera, jazz and Broadway singing under the Mary Anne David School of Vocal Music. During the late 90s, Bathiya worked as a freelance vocalist singing for radio jingles and commercials together with Ranga Dassanayake. During this period, Bathiya Jayakody and Santhush Weeraman collaborated on a few projects, which led to the formation of BnS.

In 2002, Universal Music signed a contract with them.

== Brand ambassadors ==
In 2007, they remained as ambassadors with Dialog after their contract was renewed. From 2008 to 2015, they were ambassadors for HNB Assurance. They were the ambassadors of the 2012 Sri Lanka Premier League and were one of the performers of the team anthem. In 2015, they were apponited as brand ambassadors for McDonalds' McDelivery service and Maliban Lemon Puff. In 2018, they were appointed as ambassadors for Sony's audio products. In 2026, they partnered with Prime Group.

In 2021, a company affiliated with them was accused of intellectual property theft in relation to a song from the film Address Na (2015). Composer Rohana Weerasinghe and lyricist Sunil Ariyaratne demanded that they pay a one million rupee compensation, which they reportedly did not pay.

They are co-owners of Charcoal Tandoor Fire Grill in Colombo, which opened in 2026.

== Personal life ==
Santhush married Chanchala on 21 December 2008 at the Cinnamon Grand Colombo.

== Discography ==
Year	Title	Label
1998	Vasanthaye ~ A New Beginning	Torana Music
2000	Life	Torana Music
2002	Tharunyaye	Maharaja Entertainments
2005	Neththara Project 4	Maharaja Entertainments
2006	Hiripoda Wassa (Movie OST)	SGMTunes
2007	Ayubowan	Universal Music
2007	Asai Man Piyabanna (Film OST)	SGMTunes
2008	Shaheena	SGMTunes
2008	Adaraye Namayen (Film OST)	
2009	Rosa Kale (Movie OST)	SGMTunes
2009	Sri Lanka Matha	SGMTunes
2009	Dancing Star (Movie OST)	Maharaja Entertainments
2010	Sara Sihina	SGMTunes
2014	Resvihidena	SGMTunes
2016	Pravegaya (Movie OST)	SGMTunes
2019	Oba Nisa [White Edition]	SGMTunes

Other work

Bathiya worked as an executive producer, helped with the mixing, and sang for Ashanthi De Alwis's album Sandawathuren.

== Awards and nominations ==
Year	Award	Category	Recipient(s) and nominee(s)	Result	Ref(s)
2006	Male Icons 2006	Entertainment Industry Award	Bathiya and Santhush	Won	
2010	Derana Music Video Awards	Most Popular Music Video of the Year	Sri Lanka Matha	Silver	
2011	Derana Music Video Awards	Most Popular International Collaboration of the Year	Bathiya and Santhush and Asha Bhosle for Dedunna Sedi	Won	
2023	Derana - Lux Film Awards 2023	Most Popular Song	"Sewwandi Paya" from Adaraneeya Prarthana	Won	
2026	Calin Popular Awards	Most Popular Singing Duo	Bathiya and Santhush	Won	
