= Sriyantha Mendis =

Sri Lankan dramatist (born 1957)

- ශ්‍රියන්ත මෙන්ඩිස්
- Born: Hiddadura Jude Neil Sriyantha Mendis Abeynayake; October 25, 1957 (age 68); Sri Lanka
- Education: De Mazenod College
- Occupations: Actor, director
- Years active: 1979–present
- Political party: Podujana Peramuna
- Spouse: Kusum Renu (m. 1986)
- Children: Tharuki Amaya Mendis; Nipuni Preksha
- Father: Lazarus Mendis
- Awards: Best Actor

Hiddadura Jude Neil Sriyantha Mendis Abeynayake (born 25 October 1957) (Sinhala: ශ්‍රියන්ත මෙන්ඩිස්), popularly known as Sriyantha Mendis, is an actor in Sri Lankan cinema, theater and television. Highly versatile actor from drama to comedy, Mendis has received awards for the Best actor and Best supporting actor on multiple occasions at local award festivals.

== Personal life ==
Mendis was born on 25 October 1957 in Ragama, Sri Lanka as the eldest of a family with three siblings. His father Hiddadura Lazarus Mendis was a time keeper at the Ceylon Transport Board and later became an executive officer at Sri Lanka Ports Authority. His mother Eliadura Karoline Soyza was a teacher at Holy Family Convent, Bambalapitiya as well as practiced music at Haywood. Sriyantha's grandfather Hiddadura Juan Mendis was a devout Catholic. His mother's father was Eliyadura Evgeny Zoysa and his mother was Welisarage Juliana Fernando. Sriyantha's parents were married on October 17, 1956. Sriyantha has one younger brother, Ajith and one younger sister Menik. Sriyantha's father died on July 25, 2007, at the age of 79.

He completed his education at De Mazenod College, Kandana. He did not take part in any aesthetic activities during school times. He is clever at karate during school times. His first teaching appointment was made to Pokuwagonna Maha Vidyalaya, Ganewatta, far from Polgahawela, Kurunegala. On 7 July 1979, he became a science teacher at St. Bernadette's College, Polgahawela. Later, he completed 32 years as a teacher in several schools island-wide.

Mendis is married to Kusum Renu, who is also a renowned actress in Sinhala cinema, stage and television. He met Renu during the stage drama Pandukabhaya in 1984 and the couple married on 25 October 1986 after the proposal in April 1985. The couple has two daughters. Younger Daughter Tharuki Amaya Mendis, has also acted in stage plays and work as a dubbing artist.

== Career ==
After finishing education, Mendis along with fellow actor Senaka Perera started to produce a stage play Illeesa. In 1979, Sriyantha was introduced to the stage for the first time as the devil in the play Parassa by its producer Rohana Dandeniya. He also had the opportunity to act in Neville Dias Subasinghe's play Manawayo. In November 1979, he acted in another stage play Sathuro produced by doctor Chandrapala, who worked at Ragama rehabilitation hospital. Meanwhile, he wanted to study drama, and met German theater producer Norbert J. Myer. Then he played in Myer's comedy play Ane Abilik. In 1984, he acted in the teledrama Palingu Menike directed by Dhamma Jagoda. The character 'Surasena' was so popular that there were people who imitated the character, behavior and dialogues.

After appearing in his first teledrama Palingu Menike, Sriyantha entered to the silver screen in 1987, through H. D. Premaratne's movie Mangala Thegga. He won the Best Actor Award at the State Drama Festival in 1988 for his role in Mora drama. At the 1996 Youth Drama Festival, he won the Best Actor award for his play Numba Vitharak Thala Elelui. Since then, he became a character actor in television where he made several notable characters in the television serials such as Dǣkæthi Muwahatha, Mihikathagē Daruvō, Ingammāruva, Hiru Sandu Hamuvē, Hiruṭa Muvāven, Mæṇik Nadiya Galā Basī, Bōgala Savundiris, Danḍubasnāmānaya, Chala Achala, Bæddegedara, Nǣdǣyō, Akāla Sandhyā, Weda Hāminē, Ves Muhuṇu, Asalvæsiyō, Viśva Bhū Sankrānthiya, Mayarathna and Ruwan Maliga. In 1996, he won the SIGNIS Award for Best Actor for the character 'Arachchila' in the serial Danḍubasnāmānaya. Sriyantha has won the Best Actor award for his teledramas Sath Gunalankaraya, Dǣkæthi Muwahatha, Bawa Karma and Viśhva Sankrānthiya.

=== Selected television serials ===
- 1987 – Palingu Menike as Soorasena
- 1990 – Weda Hamine as Dharmapriya
- 1991 – Sandaluthalaya
- 1991 – Dolos Mahe Api
- 1992 – Diyasuliya
- 1993 – Ape Eththo
- 1995 – Dandubasnamanaya as Arachchila
- 1996 – Nedeyo
- 1996 – Ammai Thaththai
- 1998 – Inganmaruwa
- 1999 – Bonikko
- 1999 – Sudu Mahaththuru
- 1999 – Paravi Dhenuwa as Kalinga
- 1999 – Deyyo Sakki as Thusitha
- 1999 – Varana Kambili as Lalith
- 2000 – Sathmahala as Hemantha
- 2000 – Badde Gedara
- 2000 – De Kathi Muwahatha as Jayasekara
- 2000 – Yaddehi Gedara as Randunu Bandara
- 2000 – Bonikko
- 2000 – Dekethi Muwahatha
- 2001 – Wedi Handa
- 2001 – Maayaratna as Maayaratna
- 2002 – Sakva Lihiniyo
- 2002 – Wara Mal
- 2002 – Depath Nai
- 2002 – Pem Piyawara
- 2003 – Bogala Sawundaris as Sawundiris
- 2003 – Mathi Nethi Daa
- 2003 – Hima Varusa
- 2004 – Dhawala Kanya as Percy
- 2004 – Gimhana Tharanaya as Vajira
- 2005 – Pinkada Simona
- 2005 – Suddilage Kathawa
- 2005 – Samanala Yaya
- 2005 – Indrachapa
- 2005 – Wasantha Kusalana
- 2005 – Kinduru Adaviya
- 2005 – Hiruta Muwawen
- 2006 – Chakraudhaya as Madaatuwe Appuhamy
- 2006 – Heeye Manaya
- 2006 – Ridee Ittankaraya
- 2007 – Satharadenek Senpathiyo
- 2008 – Nil Ahasa Oba as Gurunnanse
- 2009 – Api Api Wage
- 2009 – Sadgunakaraya
- 2009 – Ravana Adaviya
- 2010 – Rosa Katu
- 2010 – Sadisi Tharanaya
- 2010 – Ruwan Maliga as Ranaraja
- 2010 – Sanda Numba Nam
- 2010 – E Brain
- 2011 – Dhawala Kadulla
- 2011 – Monarathenna
- 2011 – Sanda Madiyama
- 2011 – Mathaka Ahasa
- 2012 – Saranganaa
- 2012 – Ridee Siththam
- 2012 – Visula Ahasa Yata
- 2013 – Dhawala Kadulla as Angkutta
- 2015 – Maada Obama Viya
- 2015 – Gini Avi Saha Gini Keli as Thummulle Padme
- 2016 – Vishnu Sankranthiya
- 2016 – Seethala Gini Del
- 2016 – Urumakkarayo
- 2016 – Maada Obama Viya
- 2016 – Chakra
- 2017 – Kutu Kutu Mama
- 2018 – Urumayaka Aragalaya
- 2018 – Thriloka
- 2019 – Sanda Hangila
- 2019 – Ran Bedi Minissu as Muthubanda
- 2019 – Sangeethe as Asela
- 2019 – Iththo
- 2019 – Jeewithaya Athi Thura
- 2019 – Deweni Gamana
- 2019 – Hansa Pihatu as Gurunnanse
- 2020 - Api Ape
- 2021 - Sakuuge Lokaya
- 2021 - Rehe
- 2022 - Lan Wee
- 2022 - Bandhana
- 2022 - Sangili Kanadarawa as Gurunnanse
- 2022 - Nannaththara
- 2023 - Heenayaki Me Adare
- 2025 - Mawa Mathakada
- 2025 – Sangeethe 2 as Asela
- Denuwara Gedara
- Kavi Kandula
- Sagarayak Meda

=== Selected stage dramas ===
- Deyyange Punchi Akkaraya
- Gabbara Minisa
- Kema Lasthiyi
- Maha Samayama
- Mamai Anduwa
- Padada Asapuwa
- Pansa Deke Hansaya
- Raassa Parassa
- Suba Saha Yasa
- Sudu Saha Kalu
- Warna
- Yathuru Hilen Balanna

== Filmography ==
Key
†	Denotes films that have not yet been released

Year	Film	Role	Ref.
1987	Mangala Thagga		
1989	Siri Medura		
1990	Saharawe Sihinaya		
1990	Palama Yata		
1992	Umayangana	Palitha	
1993	Juriya Mamai		
1994	Vimukthi	Journalist	
1995	Ayoma		
1996	Sihina Deshayen		
1997	Mahameara Usata		
1998	Anthima Reya	Rohana Wijeweera	
1998	Julietge Bhumikawa	Theater director	
1998	Gini Avi Saha Gini Keli	Andarawatte Lokaya	
1999	Seetha Sameere	Samson	
2002	Punchi Suranganavi	Mr. Perera	
2004	Bambara Senakeli		
2004	Mille Soya	Jude	
2005	Shades of Ash	Gambara Attho	
2005	Guerilla Marketing		
2006	Bherunda Pakshiya		
2007	Naga Kanya		
2008	Aba	Parumukhaya	
2009	Sinasuna Adaren	Bhathiya Karandeniya	
2009	Paya Enna Hiru Se	Harris	
2009	Juliya	Lesli	
2010	Bambara Walalla	Jine	
2010	Kshema Bhoomi		
2012	Prathiroo	Teacher	
2014	Ahelepola Kumarihami	Kepetipola	
2014	Siri Daladagamanaya	King Paandu	
2014	Kosthapal Punyasoma	OIC Panditharathna	
2015	Anagarika Dharmapala Srimathano	Wijewardena	
2015	Maharaja Gemunu	King Kavan Tissa	
2015	Gindari	Minister Edwin Balachandra	
2018	Porisadaya	Desmond aka Porisadaya	
2018	Nidahase Piya DS	Wrestling coach	
2019	Suba Theraniyo	Suba's father	
2019	Goree	Minister	
2019	Jaya Sri Amathithuma	Minister Galigamuwa	
2019	President Super Star	Dasharaj Dharmapala	
2019	Face to Face	Rose's father	
2019	Bhavatharana		
2021	Uthuru Sulanga	Ralahamy Mama	
2023	Midunu Vishwaya		
2022	The Game	OIC Samaradivakara	
2024	Sihinayaki Adare	Bandara	
2025	Elada Braa		
2026	Abheetha		
2026	Sargent Punchisoma	Minister	
2026	O.I.C Gadafi		
TBA	Thanapathilage Gedara †		
TBA	Kalpana †		
TBA	Yathra †		

== Awards ==
=== Youth Services Youth Drama Festival ===
Year	Nominee / work	Award	Result
1981	Numba Witharak Thala Elalui	Best Actor	Won

=== State Drama Festival ===
Year	Nominee / work	Award	Result
1988	Mora	Best Actor	Won

=== Sumathi Awards ===
Sumathi Awards

Year	Nominee / work	Award	Result
1999	Peoples'vote	Most popular Actor	Won
2001	Sanda Amawakai	Best Actor	Won
2009	Sathgunakaraya	Best Actor	Won
2010	Sadisi Tharanaya	Best Actor	Won
2016	Vishnu Sankranthiya	Best Actor	Won

=== Presidential Film Awards ===
Presidential Film Awards

Year	Nominee / work	Award	Result
2006	Bherunda Pakshiya	Best Actor	Won

=== Raigam Tele'es ===
Raigam Tele'es

Year	Nominee / work	Award	Result
2007	Peoples' vote	Most Popular Actor	Won
2013	Dhawala Kadulla	Best Actor	Won

=== SIGNIS Salutation Awards Ceremony ===
SIGNIS Salutation Awards Ceremony

Year	Nominee / work	Award	Result
2010	Bambara Walalla	Best Supporting Actor	Won

=== Television State Awards ===
Year	Nominee / work	Award	Result
2013	Dhawala Kadulla	Best Actor	Won
