= Gihan Fernando =

Sri Lankan actor and dramatist

Gihan Fernando ගිහාන් ප්‍රනාන්දු
- Born: Gihan Adrian Camil Fernando; 30 August 1967 (age 58); Wattala, Sri Lanka
- Education: De Mazenod College
- Occupations: Actor, Dramatist
- Years active: 1990–present

Gihan Adrian Camil Fernando (born 30 August 1967: Sinhala: ගිහාන් ප්‍රනාන්දු), popularly known as Gihan Fernando, is an actor in Sri Lankan cinema, stage drama and television as well as a playwright and singer.

== Personal life ==
Fernando was born on 30 August 1967 in Galudipita village in Ragama as the eldest of the family. He has one younger brother and two younger sisters. He is an old boy of De Mazenod College, Kandana. In school, he was a bright student and clever in football. Before entering drama, he worked as a university non-academic staff member.

== Acting career ==
After finishing school, he studied about theatre under numerous foreign theatre directors through the British Council while working in a company. In 1998, along with another fellow actor late Asela Jayakody, he went to a workshop conducted by Jayalal Rohana. Then, both were lucky to act in Rohana's stage drama, Bhoothawesha. He got the opportunity to act in stage roles under late Somalatha Subasinghe, K. B. Herath, Rajitha Dissanayake, Ravindra Ariyaratne and Dharmapriya Dias. He won the Best Actor Award at the Youth Drama Festival in 1990 for his role in Royston Jude's play Rangahala. Then he acted in Macbeth which was produced by a theatre group formed in Wattala under the banner Wattala Kattiya.

Fernando's maiden television acting came through Hiru Kumari directed by Nalan Mendis in 1998. Along with Kumara Thirimadura, Fernando engaged in a stage play Giha Saha Kuma.

In 2016, he organized a theatre festival titled Ma Dakina Mama to celebrate the silver jubilee of his theatre career. It was held at the Lionel Wendt Theatre in Colombo from 31 March to 3 April 2016, ending with a festival dinner and a stand-up show. He also voiced for the radio teledrama Channa Kinnaravi on Hiru FM, and Paradige on RanOne FM. He currently runs an acting school named Hit Act in Bambalapitiya for the new generation.

=== Notable theatre works ===
- Ada Kale Antigone
- Apahu Enna Ba
- Bakamuna Veedi Basi
- Balloth Ekka Ba
- Balloth Ekka Ba 2
- Bhoothawesha
- Charithe Horu Aran
- Horu Samaga Heluwen
- Janadipathi Thaththa
- Lokka Leda Wela
- Mata Erehiwa Mama
- Mata Wedi Thiyan Nedda?
- Rahas Udaviya
- Raja Man Wahala
- Rangahala
- Romba Thanks
- Saadaya Marai Salli Hamarai
- Sihina Horu Aran
- Thunsiya Heta Eka (361)
- Veeraya Marila
- Wattala Giha and Maharagama Kumar

=== Notable television serials ===
- Aalawanthi
- Adara Wassa
- Adaraneeya Amma
- Adisi Nadiya
- Ahanna Kenek Na
- Aganthukaya
- Aluth Gedara
- Api Ape
- Aththamma
- Baiscope
- Bath Amma
- Batti
- Black Town Story
- Bonda Meedum
- Dangayanta Pamanai
- Daskon
- Dhiriya Doni
- Doo Kumariyo
- Googly
- Hiru Kumari
- Hirusanda Maima
- Ingammaruwa
- Isuru Pawura
- Ithin Eeta Passe
- Katu Imbula
- Kiripabalu Vila
- Kokila Sandwaniya
- Makara Dadayama
- Maunayagaya
- Maya Mansala
- Mindada
- Muthu Pihatu
- Nim Walalla
- Nodath Desheka Arumawanthi
- Nonimi Yathra
- No Parking
- Paara
- Pahasara
- Peramaga Salakunu
- Pini Bindu
- Raja Yogaya
- Rathi Virathi
- Sadgunakaraya
- Sadisi Tharanaya
- Samanalunta Wedithiyanna
- Sandagalathenna
- Sanda Thaniyama
- Satakapata
- Satya
- Senehasa Kaviyak
- Senehase Nimnaya
- Sillara Samanallu
- Sihina Genena Kumariye
- Sihina Samagama
- Somibara Jaramara
- Sooriya Daruwo
- Sudu Hansayo
- Thanamalvila Kollek
- Three-wheel Malli
- Thunpath Ratawaka Lassana
- Thurya
- Urumakkarayo
- Uthum Pathum
- Varanaya
- Veeduru Mal
- Visula Ahasa Yata
- Wasantha Kusalana
- Wassana Sihinaya
- Yakada Kahawanu

== Filmography ==
Fernando started his film career with a minor role in 1996 film, Seeruwen Sitin directed by Winston Ajith Fernando.

Key
†	Denotes films that have not yet been released

Year	Film	Role	Ref.
1996	Seeruwen Sitin		
2003	Sonduru Dadabima	Prosecutor	
2011	Gamani	Minister's secretary	
2014	Ko Mark No Mark	Louvie	
2015	Spandana	Saliya Irugalbandara	
2019	President Super Star	Program host	
2020	The Newspaper	Senarath Iddamalgoda	
2020	Nim Him		
2021	Kawuruth Danne Na		
2022	Hithumathe Jeewithe	Gastan	
2023	Kathuru Mithuru	Thug	
2024	Gini Avi Saha Gini Keli 2		
2025	Rani		
2025	Kaasi Vaasi		
TBA	Anora †		
TBA	Amuda Raja †		
TBA	O.I.C Gadafi †		

== Awards and accolades ==
Fernando has won several awards at the local stage drama festivals and television festivals.

=== Youth Drama Festival Awards ===
Year	Nominee / work	Award	Result
1990	Rangahala	Best Actor	Won

=== State Drama Festival Awards ===
Year	Nominee / work	Award	Result
2001	Mata Erehiwa Mama	Best Supporting Actor	Won

=== Raigam Tele'es Awards ===
Year	Nominee / work	Award	Result
2016	Daskon	Best Supporting Actor	Won
