= Kusa Paba =

Kusa Paba කුස පබා
- DVD poster
- Directed by: Sunil Ariyaratne
- Written by: Tissa Abeysekera
- Based on: Buddhist Jataka tales
- Produced by: Sri Lanka Arts Society
- Starring: Pooja Umashankar; Jackson Anthony; Ravindra Randeniya; Roshan Ranawana
- Cinematography: Channa Deshapriya
- Edited by: Ravindra Guruge
- Music by: Rohana Weerasinghe
- Distributed by: EAP Theatres(EAP Films)
- Release date: 26 January 2012
- Running time: 120 minutes
- Country: Sri Lanka
- Language: Sinhala
- Box office: 210 Million LKR

Kusa Paba (Sinhala: කුස පබා) is a 2012 Sri Lankan Sinhala historical drama film, directed by Sunil Ariyaratne and co-produced by renowned film directors and producers of the Sri Lanka Arts Society, which includes H.D Premasiri, Udayakantha Warnasuriya, Rasitha Jinesena, Sunil T Fernando, Tissa Nagodavithana, Ariyadasa Peiris, Janitha Marasinghe, Justin Belagamage, Renuka Balasooriya, Dhammika Siriwardana and Somaratne Dissanayake.

The film stars Pooja Umashankar and Jackson Anthony in lead roles, along with Ravindra Randeniya and Veena Jayakody. The music was composed by Rohana Weerasinghe. It is the 1170th film in the Sinhala cinema.

The plot of the film is based on the 550 Jataka tales. It was highly profitable and a major hit among Sri Lankans.

== Plot ==
King Okkaka (Ravindra Randeniya) is the emperor of India. He rules from Kusawathie city, with his queen Seelawathie (Veena Jayakody) and two sons, Prince Kusa (Jackson Anthony) and Prince Jayampathi (Roshan Ranawana). Kusa is strong and competent in all crafts, including warfare, but he has an ugly, oil-cake-shaped face. Since he realizes that no woman is likely to marry him, he is not interested in marriage. Nonetheless, his parents, especially mother, urge him to marry. Kusa makes a golden sculpture in a woman's shape and tells his mother that he will marry if she can find a woman who looks like the sculpture. The queen orders two royal servants (Mahinda Pathirage and Mahendra Perera) to take the statue to all other countries and find a woman who looks like the statue. After a long, unsuccessful search, the two royal servants arrive at Madura city, the capital of the Madura kingdom, during the season of the spring festival. Madura is a state under the control of Okkaka's empire. They place the statue near the river. Then the nanny of the royal family of Madura kingdom, Kudi ( A hunchbacked woman) (Chandani Seneviratne), comes there and slaps the statue because she recognized the sculpture as the Princess Pabawathie (Pooja Umashankar), the daughter of King Madu (Palitha Silva), the king of Madura Kingdom and his queen (Kusum Renu). Because the woman who looks like the statue has been found, the marriage is arranged. Pabawathie is taken to Kusawathie city, and the wedding is conducted without a groom.

Seelawathie tells Pabawathie that there is a tradition in their caste that the wife shall not see the husband until she becomes pregnant. Kusa disguises himself as a workman and sees Pabawathie at a stable of horses and elephants. He jokes. Pabawathie urges Seelawathie to show Kusa. She makes both brothers climb onto an elephant and shows both of them. Pabawathie thinks that handsome Jayampathi is her husband Kusa. When she is bathing in a pond he hides under the waterlily leaves and catches her hand. Then she identifies him as Kusa and realizes that she was cheated. She leaves for her home, Madura. Brokenhearted, Kusa goes to Madura and works as a cook, a potter, and a florist for the royal palace. He prepares and sends delicious food, beautiful pottery, and garlands to Pabawathie. She throws them away after knowing that they were sent by Kusa.

News spread in other states that Kusa and Pabawathie are divorced. So seven state kings come to war against King Madu for Pabawathie. Okkaka requests Pabawathie return to Kusawathie. She refuses. Okkaka orders she is cut into seven pieces, and he plans to give those pieces to seven state kings. Just before her death, armed Kusa comes and saves her, stating that she is his wife and no one should harm her. A rain falls. His face's ugliness is washed away. Kusa and Pabawathie happily return to Kusawathi. Okkaka gives the crown to Kusa, making him the emperor.

== Cast ==
- Pooja Umashankar as Queen Pabāwathī.
- Jackson Anthony as King Kusa.
- Ravindra Randeniya as King Okkāka.
- Veena Jayakody as Queen Sīlāwathī.
- Roshan Ranawana as Prince Jayampathī.
- Mahendra Perera as Royal Servant.
- Mahinda Pathirage as Royal Servant.
- Chandani Seneviratne as Kudī.
- Palitha Silva as King Madu.
- Kusum Renu as King Madu's Queen consort
- Gamini Jayalath as a drum announcer

== Soundtrack ==
The soundtrack features five songs composed by Rohana Weerasinghe who also composed the Background Score. All lyrics were penned by Sunil Ariyaratne.

No.	Title	Singer(s)	Length
1.	"Madura Wasanthe"	Harshana Dissanayake, Nirosha Virajini, Uresha Ravihari and Bandula Wijeweera
2.	"Madu Chandra yame"	Kasun Kalhara
3.	"Yata Giya Dawasa"	Edward Jayakody
4.	"Jala Darawe"	Uresha Ravihari
5.	"Rata Wasiyanta Jaya Sri"	Nirosha Virajini, Harshana Dissanayake

== Awards ==
The film has won many awards at many local film festivals.

- 2013 Derana Lux Film Festival Award for the Most Popular Movie
- 2013 Derana Lux Film Festival Award for the Most Popular Actor - Roshan Ranawana
- 2013 Derana Lux Film Festival Award for the Most Popular Actress - Pooja Umashankar
- 2013 Derana Lux Film Festival Award for the Best Supporting Actress - Veena Jayakody
- 2013 Derana Lux Film Festival Award for the Best Background Music - Rohana Weerasinghe
- 2013 Derana Lux Film Festival Award for the Best Music Direction - Rohana Weerasinghe
- 2013 Derana Lux Film Festival Award for the Best Singer (Male) - Kasun Kalhara
- 2013 Derana Lux Film Festival Award for the Best Singer (Female) - Nirosha Virajini
- 2013 Derana Lux Film Festival Award for the Best Song Visual - Madura Wasanthe song
- 2013 Derana Lux Film Festival Award for the Best Dance Direction - Chandana Wickramasinghe
- 2013 Derana Lux Film Festival Award for the Best Art Direction - Heenatigala Premadasa
- 2013 Derana Lux Film Festival Award for the Best Costumes - Wenuka Wickramarachchi
- 2014 Hiru Golden Film Festival Award for the Best Singer (Female) - Uresha Ravihari
- 2013 SLIIM Neilson Peoples' Award for the Film of the Year
- 2013 SIGNIS Award for the Most Creative Supporting Actress - Chandani Seneviratne
