= Hiripoda Wassa =

Hiripoda Wassa හිරිපොද වැස්ස
- Directed by: Udayakantha Warnasuriya
- Written by: Udayakantha Warnasuriya
- Screenplay by: Udayakantha Warnasuriya
- Story by: Udayakantha Warnasuriya
- Produced by: EAP Films
- Starring: Roshan Ranawana; Pubudu Chathuranga; Harshani Perera; Chathurika Peiris; Jayalath Manoratne
- Cinematography: Jayanath Gunawardena
- Edited by: Ravindra Guruge
- Music by: Bathiya and Santhush
- Production company: Prasad Color Lab
- Distributed by: EAP Films
- Release date: January 12, 2006 (Sri Lanka)
- Country: Sri Lanka
- Language: Sinhala

Hiripoda Wassa is a 2006 Sri Lankan Sinhala romantic movie directed by Udayakantha Warnasuriya and produced by Soma Edirisinghe for EAP Films. It stars Roshan Ranawana and Pubudu Chathuranga in lead roles along with Chathurika Peiris and Jayalath Manoratne. Music composed by Bathiya and Santhush. They story revolves around young lives engulfed in the challenges in the present-day society, in Sri Lanka. It is the 1063rd Sri Lankan film in the Sinhalese cinema. The film brought Harshini Perera, Jayantha Atapattu and Akila Sandakelum to cinema for the first time.

== Plot ==
The story revolves round three teenagers - Prageeth (Roshan), a younger, darker version of Hugh Grant, the son of a business tycoon (Corea), whose fiancé is Veena (Anarkali); Sithum (Pubudu), the son of a Postman (Jayalath) is in love with Pooja, (Chathurika) while Ramith who says he comes from the middle class, and is seduced by his biology teacher who as luck would have it lives in an apartment directly opposite his block of flats, nevertheless, voices every teenagers views of life when he says all he wants to do is to take things easy." (Shape eke jeevath venava).

== Cast ==
- Roshan Ranawana as Prageeth Justin Molligoda
- Pubudu Chathuranga as Sithum Panthaka Waduge
- Jayantha Atapattu as Ramith Kariyapperuma
- Chathurika Peiris as Pooja
- Jayalath Manoratne as Sithum's father
- Akila Sandakelum as Gihan
- Anarkali Akarsha as Veena
- Janith Wickramage as Chamara
- Harshini Perera as Teacher
- Nilmini Kottegoda as Sithum's mother
- Mihira Sirithilaka as Sarath
- Seetha Kumari as Prema
- Ranjan Ramanayake - himself, special appearance.
- Jeevarani Kurukulasuriya as Pooja's mother
- Vijaya Corea as Prageeth's father

== Soundtrack ==
No.	Title	Lyrics	Singer(s)	Length
1.	"Neela Nimnaye"	Nilar N. Kasim	Nirosha Virajini, Santhush Weeraman
2.	"Hiripoda Wassa Wageya"	Sunil Wimalaweera	Bathiya and Santhush, Ashanthi De Alwis, Jananath Warakagoda, Niwanthi Gunasekara
3.	"Seema Mayim Na"	Nilar N. Kasim	Bathiya and Santhush
4.	"Anande Wahi Walawa"	Nilar N. Kasim	Bathiya and Santhush, Ashanthi De Alwis, Niwanthi Gunasekara

== Reception ==
Aditha Dissanayake of Sunday Observer wrote, "Hiripoda Wassa however, is not a movie that would make you think or cry, and no one would dream of using the highest compliment on the tongues of the teenage characters in the movie to describe it."
