= Dhammika Siriwardana =

- Born: K.D.T Siriwardena; 15 September 1954; Colombo, Sri Lanka
- Died: 15 December 2015 (aged 61)
- Education: Nalanda College, Colombo
- Occupations: Businessman, Film Director and Producer

Dhammika Siriwardana (15 September 1954 – 15 December 2015) (also known as Dhammika Siriwardena and K.D.T Siriwardena) was a Sri Lankan film director, teledrama producer and a businessman. Dhammika is the founding Chairman of Alankulama Holdings (Pvt) Ltd.

== Early life ==
Dhammika was educated at Nalanda College, Colombo.

== Filmography ==
Dhammika was the script writer & director of film Suwanda Denuna Jeewithe that featured famous actors Roshan Ranawana and Pooja Umashankar. Asai Man Piyabanna was a film produced by Dhammika Siriwardana. Few of other films produced by Dhammika are Rosa Kele, Paaya Enna Hiru Se and Mahindagamanaya.
