= Rosa Kale =

Rosa Kale රෝස කැලේ
- Directed by: Sanjaya Nirmal
- Written by: Nishantha Weerasingha
- Produced by: Dhammika Siriwardena
- Starring: Monika Maruthiraj; Roshan Ranawana; Sanath Gunathilake
- Cinematography: Jayanath Gunawardena
- Edited by: Ajith Ramanayake
- Music by: Rohana Weerasinghe; Bathiya and Santhush
- Distributed by: EAP Theaters
- Release date: 30 May 2008
- Country: Sri Lanka
- Language: Sinhala

Rosa Kale (Rose Forest) (Sinhala: රෝස කැලේ) is a 2008 Sri Lankan Sinhala drama mystery film directed by Sanjaya Nirmal and produced by Dhammika Siriwardena for Alankulama Films. It stars Indian actress Monika Maruthiraj and Roshan Ranawana in lead roles along with Sanath Gunathilake and Iranganie Serasinghe. Music co-composed by Rohana Weerasinghe and Bathiya and Santhush. It is the 1106th Sri Lankan film in the Sinhala cinema.

Initially cast with Pooja Umashankar for the lead role, she has withdrawn due to busy schedule for her previous films.

== Plot ==
The film revolves around an orphanage run by a wealthy philanthropist in memory of his dead wife. Due to the bad management the orphanage faces a difficult time and this affects the children and discipline of the institution. Disappointed with the development Suriyabandara, the owner of the orphanage decides to close down it. Yet due to the request of his son and mother gives one more chance recruiting a new mistress to the place. And Nimsara a young beautiful girl takes up the post and 'Rosa Kele' shows the dramatic changes that take place in the institution.

== Cast ==
- Monika Maruthiraj as Nimsara
- Roshan Ranawana as Akalanka
- Sanath Gunathilake as Mr. Sooriyabandara
- Iranganie Serasinghe as Akalanka's granny
- Anton Jude as Basil
- Kumara Thirimadura as Percy
- Nilanthi Wijesinghe as Matron
- Eddie Amarasinghe
- Chitra Warakagoda as Nimasara's mother
- Dinuli Mendis as Introductory Narrator
- Narada Bakmeewewa as himself
- Rozanne Dias as herself

== Soundtrack ==
No.	Title	Singer(s)	Length
1.	"Kekulak Peedenawamai"	Umaria Sinhawansa
2.	"Randam Wage"	Amila Perera, Uresha Ravihari
3.	"Gum Nade Ranin Rane"	Umaria Sinhawansa, Santhush Weeraman
