= Rider (2023 film) =

- Sinhala: රයිඩර්
- Directed by: Rajitha Hiran
- Written by: Rajitha Hiran
- Story by: Rajitha Hiran
- Produced by: Indunil Creations
- Starring: Roshan Ranawana; Dasuni Senethma; Anuj Ranasinghe; Sarath Dikkumbura; Sanath Gunathilake
- Cinematography: Sujith Nishantha
- Edited by: Thanushka Kahandawala
- Music by: Heshan Kuruppu; Chamika Samarasinghe; Sasindu Diluranga
- Production company: ARC Cinema
- Distributed by: EAP Theatres
- Release date: 15 December 2023
- Country: Sri Lanka
- Language: Sinhala

Rider (Sinhala: රයිඩර්) is a 2023 Sri Lankan Sinhalese language action thriller film directed by Rajitha Hiran in his directorial debut and produced by Anushka Indunil for Indunil Creations. It stars Roshan Ranawana in lead role along with Anuj Ranasinghe, Sanath Gunathilake, Chili Thilanka and Sarath Kulanga in supportive roles.

The film was released on 15 December 2023 in EAP Theatres during the "Savoy Cinema Festival 2023".

== Cast ==
- Roshan Ranawana as Sadesh
- Dasuni Senethma
- Anuj Ranasinghe
- Sarath Dikkumbura
- Rajitha Hiran
- Chili Thilanka
- Sarath Kulanga
- Sanath Gunathilake
- Ryan Van Rooyen
- Chami Senanayake
- Vishudhi Senethma
- Ferolin Justin
- Nishani Thennakoon
- Sanath Nishantha
- Jayaratne Galagedara
- Priyantha Dharmashili
- Niranjala Karunaratne
- Ranga Sampath
- Anushka Indunil
- Sandaru Kaushal Kumarasinghe
- Rohan Paul
- Mandakini Adithya
- Nilu Sewwandi
- Thara Kaluarachchi
- Anil Jayasinghe
- Bhagya Sampath
- Supun Sathsara Bandara
- Sesiri Senaviratne

== Production ==
The film is the maiden cinema direction by popular comedy actor Rajitha Hiran. Besides, he also made the story, dialogue, screenplay and song lyrics. The film is produced by popular advanced level chemistry tutor Anushka Indunil, where he also made a minor role. Assistant directors are Suresh Kumarasinghe, Lochan M. Senaviratne and Sameera Madhushan. Sujith Nishantha is the cinematographer and Thanushka Kahandawala made editing and color combination. Manuka Dilshan Galagedara, Manju Gunawardena together made the Feature essay, whereas Yapa Wijebandara, Supun Shalika, Buddhika Paranavithana and Sameera Iduranga involved with lighting.

Suneth Nandalal handled art direction along with the assistance by Aruna Madhusankha, Ashen Akalankah and M. Ashad Shams. Sashin Juman Perera made sound mixing, Janitha Sheranga, Nishani Thennakone and Lochan M. Senaviratne made special sound effects. Kavita Salgado is the Visual Effects coordinator, where Yasas Sri and Manoj Sampath helped with camera support. Rasangi Gajasinghe and Devindi Thennakoon made English subtitles and Keerthi Ranjith supplied Police uniforms with the Police background design done by Srinath Maldeniya.

Asanka Dissanayake is the production coordinator and Rashika Prabhath is the choreographer. Music co-directed by Chamika Samarasinghe, Sasindu Diluranga and Elon Shepard. Tashni Perera and Manjula Siriwardena made background vocals. Samantha Mayadunna and Dhammika Pushpakumara are the stunt directors.

The film trailer was released online in March, 2023.
