= Seetha Man Awa =

- Sinhala: සීතා මං ආවා
- Directed by: Jayasekara Aponso
- Written by: Jayasekara Aponso
- Produced by: Chaminda Ranasinghe
- Starring: Bandu Samarasinghe; Jayasekara Aponso; Sanoja Bibile; Rodney Warnakula
- Cinematography: Dilan Gunawardana
- Edited by: Dilan Gunawardana
- Music by: Rohana Weerasinghe
- Production company: Dinith Entertainment
- Distributed by: E.A.P Films
- Release date: 13 September 2013
- Running time: 90 minutes
- Country: Sri Lanka
- Language: Sinhala

Seetha Man Awa (Sinhala: සීතා මං ආවා) is a 2013 Sri Lankan Sinhala family comedy film directed by Jayasekara Aponso and produced by Chaminda Ranasinghe. It is Aponso's second directorial work, starring Bandu Samarasinghe and Jayasekara Aponso in the lead roles, along with Sanoja Bibile, Rodney Warnakula, and Kumara Thirimadura. The film's music was composed by Rohana Weerasinghe. It is the 1195th Sri Lankan film in the Sinhala cinema.

== Cast ==
- Bandu Samarasinghe as Rama
- Jayasekara Aponso as Ravana
- Chanchala Warnasooriya as Sita
- Sanoja Bibile as film directress
- Rodney Warnakula as guide
- Kumara Thirimadura
- Bandula Wijeweera
- Sarath Kulanga
- Jeevan Handunnetti
- Don Guy
- Ranjith Silva as Haramanis "Hanuma"

== Soundtrack ==
No.	Title	Singer(s)	Length
1.	"Vichithra Pavithra Adare"	Uresha Ravihari, Mario Ananda
2.	"Ayubowan Ayubowan"	Uresha Ravihari, Rodney Warnakula
