= Dancing Star =

Dancing Star ඩාන්සින් ස්ටාර්
- Directed by: Susara Dinal
- Written by: Aruna Jayawardena
- Produced by: Sirasa Films
- Starring: Dushyanth Weeraman; Shiroshi Romeshika; Sanath Gunathilake
- Cinematography: Lalith M. Thomas
- Edited by: Jeewantha Devapriya
- Music by: Bathiya and Santhush
- Distributed by: CEL Theatres
- Release date: 12 February 2009
- Country: Sri Lanka
- Language: Sinhala

Dancing Star (Sinhala: ඩාන්සින් ස්ටාර්) is a 2009 Sri Lankan Sinhala drama film directed by Susara Dinal and produced by Sirasa Movies for MTV Network (Pvt) Ltd. It stars popular singer Dushyanth Weeraman and newcomer Shiroshi Romeshika in lead roles along with Sanath Gunathilake and Nilanthi Dias. Music composed by Bathiya and Santhush. It is the 1120th Sri Lankan film in the Sinhala cinema.

== Cast ==
The film leads with two newcomers to the cinema industry.

- Dushyanth Weeraman
- Shiroshi Romeshika as Shiroshi
- Sanath Gunathilake as Ramanayake
- Nilanthi Dias
- Hashini Gonagala
- Sarath Kothalawala
- Roshan Ranawana as Sudesh
- Ravindra Randeniya as Greshan
- Kumara Thirimadura
- Rosy Senanayake
- Lakshman Mendis
- Vishaka Siriwardana
- Nirosha Perera as Nirosha
- Malini Fonseka - herself, cameo appearance
- Sabeetha Perera - herself, cameo appearance

== Soundtrack ==
No.	Title	Singer(s)	Length
1.	"Vasana Lovak"	Dushyanth Weeraman
2.	"Das Piyan Wesena Asille"	Bathiya & Santhush
3.	"Saragi Sihina Andakare"	Santhush Weeraman
4.	"Hithak Nam Siththam Renai"	Bathiya & Santhush
