= The Rainbow (2016 film) =

Ran Dedunnak
- Sinhala: රන් දේදුන්නක්
- Directed by: Nalin Rajapakshe
- Written by: Sunil Premaratne
- Produced by: Moonlight Films
- Starring: Roshan Ranawana; Tanasha Hatharasinghe; Rex Kodippili
- Cinematography: Buddika Mangala
- Edited by: Anusha Jayawardhana; Kasun Madawa
- Music by: Udaya Sri Wickramasinghe
- Production company: Srasavi Studio
- Distributed by: CEL Theatres
- Release date: 20 October 2016
- Country: Sri Lanka
- Language: Sinhala

Ran Dedunnak (The Rainbow) (Sinhala: රන් දේදුන්නක්) is a 2016 Sri Lankan Sinhala masala film directed by Nalin Rajapakshe and produced by Raja Balasooriya for Moonlight Films. It stars Roshan Ranawana and newcomer Tanasha Satharasinghe in lead roles along with Rex Kodippili and Kumara Thirimadura. Music composed by Udaya Sri Wickramasinghe. It is the 1259th Sri Lankan film in the Sinhala cinema.

== Plot ==
Story revolves around a young man named Roshan who comes to Colombo in search of life and encounters dashing lass in the city who happens to be a journalist. The female journalist who named Nishani is caught in a drug haul that she has been trying to expose to the public via media. King Pin of the drug mafia is on the hunt for the female journalist. In the midst of this controversy she encounters her lover to be, the young macho man who comes to town out of the blues.

== Cast ==
- Roshan Ranawana as Roshan
- Tanasha Satharasinghe as Nishani
- Rex Kodippili as Minister Weerarathne
- Kumara Thirimadura as Victor
- Nadeeka Gunasekara as Shiva's mother
- Mihira Sirithilaka as Bala
- Raneesh Shyamanga as Shiva
- Shanudrie Priyasad as Rashmi
- Susila Kottage as Woman at gym
- Nilmini Kottegoda as Woman at gym
- Wasantha Kumaravila as Mark
- Dinakshie Priyasad as Roshan's sister
- Raja Ganeshan as Shiva's father
- Dayasiri Hettiarachchi as Roshan's father
- D.B. Gangodathenna

== Soundtrack ==
No.	Title	Lyrics	Singer(s)	Length
1.	"Nethin Netha Hamuwee"	Nilar N. Kasim	Mohan Wickramasooriya
2.	"Madahase Rahasa"	Udaya Sri	Udaya Sri
