= Nihada Sewaneli =

- Sinhala: නිහඬ සෙවණැලි
- Directed by: Sunil Premarathna
- Written by: Sunil Premarathna; Harith Wasala
- Produced by: Janaka Ranchagoda
- Starring: Pubudu Chathuranga; Roshan Ranawana; Kumara Thirimadura
- Cinematography: K.D. Dayananda; Mahesh Karunarathne
- Edited by: Anura Bandara
- Music by: Darshana Wickramathunga
- Distributed by: EAP Theatres
- Release date: 11 November 2021
- Country: Sri Lanka
- Language: Sinhala

Nihada Sewaneli (Sinhala: නිහඬ සෙවණැලි, lit. 'Silent Shadows') is a 2021 Sri Lankan Sinhalese language horror film directed by Sunil Premarathna and produced by Janaka Ranchagoda for Sineka Films. It stars Pubudu Chathuranga and Roshan Ranawana in lead roles along with Kumara Thirimadura, Tharuka Wanniarachchi and Mashi Siriwardane made supportive roles. The premiere of the film was held on 11 November 2021 under the patronage of Minister Rear Admiral Sarath Weerasekera at the Savoy Primory Cinema in Wellawatte. It has the implication that "even your children can be cursed if you destroy the environment."

== Cast ==
- Pubudu Chathuranga
- Roshan Ranawana
- Kumara Thirimadura
- Harith Wasala
- Sarath Chandrasiri
- Ajith Weerasinghe
- Kumara Wadurassa
- Meena Kumari
- Tharuka Wanniarachchi
- Mashi Siriwardane
- Dhananji Tharuka
- Sandun Bandara
- Yohani Hansika
