= Rajitha Hiran =

Sri Lankan actor and comedian

- රජිත හිරාන්
- Born: Muthuthanthrige Rajitha Hiran Chamikara Fernando; 14 July 1981 (age 45); Panadura, Sri Lanka
- Other name: Ping Pong
- Occupations: Actor, Comedian, Film Director, Singer, Performing Artist, scriptwriter
- Years active: 1999–present
- Spouse: Andrea Jones
- Children: Amenda Fernando Arianna Fernando
- Parent: Jayasiri Fernando

Muthuthanthrige Rajitha Hiran Chamikara Fernando (Sinhala: රජිත හිරාන් චාමිකර; born 14 July 1981), popularly known as Rajitha Hiran is an actor in Sri Lankan Cinema, stage drama and television. Particularly acting in comedy roles, Hiran is best known for the role of Ping Pong in the television serial Thattu Gewal, which became his trademark of the career.

== Personal life ==
Chamikara is an old boy of Prince of Wales' College, Moratuwa.

Chamikara is married to his longtime partner Andrea. They have two daughters. His wife Andrea is from Indian descent and is an Indian Tamil Roman Catholic. Chamikara is a Sinhala Buddhist.

His uncle Hemasiri Sellapperuma is also a renowned artist.

== Career ==
He started acting career through the television series Thattu Gewal. His character Ping Pong was highly popularized. Chamikara started his film career with Cheriyo Holman in 2002, directed by Parakrama Jayasinghe with a minor role. Then he continued to be a popular comedian in his generation and became very popular through the films Somy Boys, Ulath Ekai Pilath Ekai and Kolamba Sanniya Returns. In 2021, he appeared in the stage play Kakkoth Ekka Behe.

His maiden cinema direction came through 2023 action thriller Rider which was released on 15 December 2023 in EAP cinemas.

== Filmography ==
Key
†	Denotes films that have not yet been released

Year	Film	Role	Ref.
2002	Cheriyo Holman		
2002	Bahubuthayo	Temple Worker	
2002	Somy Boys	Dadin Bidin	
2003	Sepata Dukata Sunny	Tarzan	
2003	Numba Nadan Apita Pissu	Patiya	
2003	Hitha Honda Pisso	Three wheel driver	
2004	Clean Out	Familia's servant	
2004	Ra Daniel Dawal Migel 3	Ping Pong 000	
2004	Aadaraneeya Wassaanaya		
2004	Selamuthu Pinna		
2004	Ohoma Harida	Vadda	
2004	Jolly Boys	Sumo wrestling referee	
2005	One Shot	Pushpakumara's secretary	
2005	Mihidum Wasanthe		
2006	Dedunu Wessa		
2006	Double Game		
2007	Mr Dana Rina		
2007	No Problem Darling		
2008	Adaraye Namayen		
2008	Adara Meena		
2009	Sihina Devduwa		
2011	Sanda Dev Doni	(Home movie)	
2011	Thank You Berty		
2012	Sihinaya Dige Enna	Hiran	
2013	Ira Laga Wadi	Rajitha	
2015	Honey Bunny	Honey (Home movie)	
2016	Ulath Ekai Pilath Ekai	Rajiya	
2017	Punchi Apith Baya Na Dan	Diyasena	
2018	Kusal	Somapala	
2018	Gharasarapa		
2018	Kolamba Sanniya Returns	Hichcha	
2019	Iskoleta Man Awa	Banda	
2019	Nathi Bari Tarzan	Motion	
2019	Thiththa Aththa	Vise Kurutta	
2019	Goree	Inspector Silva	
2019	Face to Face	Mahesh	
2019	Inda Nimidam		
2020	Seda Mawathe	Waiter	
2022	Rashmi		
2021	Hathara Varan	Jine's accomplice	
2023	Rider		
2025	Rosa Adare	Janith	
2026	Sathara Waram		
TBA	Kidnap †		
TBA	Nilu Man Adarei †		
TBA	Edath Dinum Adath Dinum †		
TBA	Reyak Ho Peyak †		
