= Porisadaya =

- Sinhala: පෝරිසාදයා
- Directed by: Siritunga Perera
- Produced by: Chandrasena Palihena; Indika Wijeratne
- Starring: Udari Warnakulasooriya; Sriyantha Mendis; Darshan Dharmaraj
- Cinematography: Mahesh Karunaratne
- Edited by: Pravin Jayaratne
- Music by: Suneth Kelum
- Distributed by: LFD Theatres
- Release date: February 16, 2018
- Country: Sri Lanka
- Language: Sinhala

Porisadaya (The Gangster) (Sinhala: පෝරිසාදයා) is a 2018 Sri Lankan Sinhala action masala film directed by Siritunga Perera and co-produced by Chandrasena Palihena and Indika Wijeratne. It stars Udari Warnakulasooriya and Sriyantha Mendis in lead roles along with Darshan Dharmaraj and Kumara Thirimadura. Music composed by Suneth Kelum. It is the 1297th Sri Lankan film in the Sinhala cinema.

== Cast ==
- Sriyantha Mendis as Desmond aka Porisadaya
- Udari Warnakulasooriya as Heli Wedisinghe
- Harsha Udakanda as Harsha
- Darshan Dharmaraj as Kalu Mahaththaya
- Kumara Thirimadura as Basnayake
- Udara Rathnayake as Vishwa Basnayake
- Kamal Deshapriya as Wedisinghe
- Amila Karunanayake as Desmond's son
- D.B. Gangodathenna as James
- Aishara Athukorala as Aisha
- Hashinika Karaliyadde as Desmond's wife
- Rajasinghe Loluwagoda as Chief monk
- Kapila Sigera
- Chamila Gamage as Aisha's Friend
- Imaya Liyanage as Sasmitha
- Kamal desapriya
