= Amal Jayawardane =

Sri Lankan historian (born 1947)

Amal Jayawardane is a Sri Lankan historian. He was born in 1947 in the Western province of Sri Lanka. He had his early education at De Mazenod College, Kandana. He obtained his B.A. Honours degree from the University of Ceylon, Peradeniya, Sri Lanka and M.A. PhD from the University of Washington, Seattle, USA. Presently, he is the Dean of the Faculty of Arts, University of Colombo, Sri Lanka.

Formerly, he was the Head of the Department of History & International Relations. He was also the coordinator of the M.A. Degree Programme in International Relations, University of Colombo.

He has also served as visiting professor at American University, Washington D.C., US, (Spring Semester 1989) and Research Scholar at the Department of International Relations, London School of Economics and Political Science, U.K. (1989–1990).

Professor Amal Jayawardane also serves as a Consultant to the National Integration Programme Unit (NIPU) of the Ministry of Ethnic Affairs and National Integration.

During the period 1994–1997, he served as a Member of the Presidential Commission of Inquiry in respect of Involuntary Removal and Disappearances of Persons in the Western, Southern and Sabaragamuwa Provinces. Nearly ten thousand witnesses came to give evidence before this Presidential Commission.

He has also functioned as a member of the Coordinating Committee, Centre for the Study of Human Rights (CSHR), University of Colombo; Co-Director, Centre for Policy Studies and Research (CEPRA), University of Colombo; Member of the Board of Directors, Institute of International Studies (IIS), Kandy; Member, Board of Management, Bandaranaike Centre For International Studies (BCIS), and the Sri Lanka Institute of International Relations (SLIIR).

His recent publications include two edited books: Perspectives on National integration in Sri Lanka (Colombo: Karunaratna & Sons), 2006 and Documents on Sri Lanka’s Foreign Policy, 1947–1965, Colombo: Ceylon Printers Limited, 2005.
