= Sathara Waram =

- සතර වරම්
- Genre: Drama
- Written by: K.B. Herath
- Directed by: Thisula Deepa Thabavita
- Starring: Chameera Liyanage; Udayanthi Kulathunga
- Country of origin: Sri Lanka
- Original language: Sinhala
- No. of episodes: 55

Production
- Producer: Newton Vidanapathirana
- Editor: Shan Ranga
- Running time: 30 minutes

Original release
- Network: Sri Lanka Rupavahini Corporation
- Release: January 2026 – present

Sathara Waram is a Sri Lankan television drama series directed by Thisula Deepa Thabavita and written by veteran playwright K.B. Herath. The series premiered in early 2026 and currently airs on Rupavahini on weekdays at 7:30 PM (SLST).

== Cast ==
- Chameera Liyanage
- Udayanthi Kulathunga
- Rajitha Hiran
- Nishantha Priyadarshana
- Richard Manamudali
- Saman Almeda
- Sanjula Divarathna
- Chathura Perera
- Rohan Wijethunga
- Rukshana Disanayaka
- Kumari Senarathna
- Sheruni Horanage
- Udeni Nadeeka
- Pavithra Wickramasinghe
- Nilangani Perera

== Production ==
The teledrama is produced by Newton Vidanapathirana. The visual editing is handled by Shan Ranga, while the script is authored by K.B. Herath, known for his contribution to high-quality Sri Lankan television literature.

== Broadcast ==
The series is broadcast on the national television network, Rupavahini, on weekday evenings. As of March 3, 2026, the show has completed 55 episodes.

== See also ==
- Sri Lanka Rupavahini Corporation
