= De Mazenod College =

Location
- Kandana; Sri Lanka
- Coordinates: 7°03′N 79°54′E

Information
- Type: Semi Government
- Motto: Latin: Animo-et-fide (Courageously and faithfully)
- Established: 1931
- Founder: Rev Fr.Romould Fernando
- Principal: Janaka Fonseka
- Grades: 1–13
- Gender: Boys (Co-educational from grade 6)
- Age: 6 to 19
- Campus size: 3800
- Colours: Blue, White and gold
- Website: www.demazenodcollege.com

De Mazenod College (DMC), founded in 1931, is a Catholic school in Kandana, Sri Lanka, now managed by the De La Salle Brothers. De Mazenod College is a mixed school and has classes from grade 1 to grade 13. Classes are conducted in Sinhala as well as English. Girls are admitted to the school from grade 6 upwards.

== History ==
On 12 October 1930, Colombo Archbishop Pierre-Guillaume Marque laid the foundation for a new building at the school's current location. In 1931, it was named to De Mazenod College, and in 1933, it came under the control of the De La Salle brothers. The first prize giving was held in 1937 under the patronage of the principal, Charles Louis, and was attended by Deputy Education Director W. R. Watson.

The first ever inter-house sports meet was held in 1938. The chief guest was S. W. R. D. Bandaranaike. The college houses at the time were De La Salle, Marque, and Romould.

An old boys' union with about 100 members was inaugurated in 1943, and Sinhala-language classes began in 1947

== Houses ==
The students are divided into four houses:

=== Alban House ===
- Named after Alban Patrick, a former principal of the school.
- Color : Red

=== De La Salle House ===
- Named after Saint Jean-Baptiste de la Salle
- Color : Blue

=== Marque House ===
- Named after Colombo Archbishop Pierre-Guillaume Marque
- Color : Yellow

=== Romould House ===
- Named after the founder of school, Romould Fernando.
- Color : Green

== Notable alumni ==
Below is a list of notable alumni of De Mazenod College

| Name | Notability | Reference |
|---|---|---|
| Vijaya Kumaranatunga | Actor, Playback Singer, politician (founder Sri Lanka Mahajana Pakshaya) | |
| Rohan Amarasinghe | Rear Admiral (Rtd) Sri Lanka Navy-Former Commander Eastern Naval Area | |
| Shihan Mihiranga Bennet | singer, songwriter | |
| Kingsley De Silva | obstetrician, gynaecologist | |
| Dampath Fernando | Deputy Chief of Staff of Sri Lanka Army (2017–present) | |
| Dilhara Fernando | international cricket player (2000–2012) | |
| Amal Jayawardane | historian | |
| Harry Jayawardena | Businessman | |
| Jayalath Jayawardena | member of Parliament - Gampaha (1994–2013) | |
| Sriyantha Mendis | dramatist | |
| Gihan Fernando | dramatist | |
| Dhammika Prasad | international cricket player (2008–2015) | |
| Lakshan Sandakan | international cricket player (2016–present) | |
