= Tikiri Suwanda =

- Sinhala: ටිකිරි සුවඳ
- Directed by: Sunil Aruna Weerasiri
- Written by: Sunil Aruna Weerasiri
- Produced by: Aruna Kanthi Films
- Starring: Joe Abeywickrama; Rodney Warnakula; Jayalal Rohana
- Cinematography: K. D. Dayananda
- Edited by: Ravindra Guruge
- Music by: Rohana Weerasinghe
- Distributed by: EAP Theatres
- Release date: 10 October 2010
- Country: Sri Lanka
- Language: Sinhala

Tikiri Suwanda (Sinhala: ටිකිරි සුවඳ) is a 2010 Sri Lankan Sinhala family drama film directed by Sunil Aruna Weerasiri and produced by Kanthi Weerasiri for Aruna Kanthi Films. It stars Maleesha Samaratunga and Pramodh Mihiranga Weerasiri in lead roles along with Joe Abeywickrama and Jayalal Rohana. Music composed by Rohana Weerasinghe. It is the 1147th Sri Lankan film in the Sinhala cinema.

The film was shot around Narammala area.

== Cast ==
- Maleesha Samaratunga as Tikiri
- Pramodh Mihiranga Weerasiri as Ramesh
- Joe Abeywickrama as Devendra, Samanmalee's father
- Anula Karunathilaka as Samanmalee's mother
- Rodney Warnakula as Suran
- Janaka Ranasinghe as Parakku
- Jayalal Rohana as Rajasinghe Chulodara aka Baby
- Giriraj Kaushalya as Alphonsu
- Duleeka Marapana as Samanmalee
- Ramya Wanigasekara as Tikiri's granny Rosalin
- Priyantha Seneviratne as Gurunnanse
- Sarath Kothalawala as Gas Banda
- Upeksha Swarnamali as Nilmini
- Sarath Chandrasiri as Chandare
- Nirdha Uyanheva as Jasmine
- Anura Bandara Rajaguru as Sirimangala Kapuwa, the match-maker
- Pramudi Karunaratne as Anjula
- Saranapala Jayasuriya as Chief monk

== Songs ==
No.	Title	Singer(s)	Length
1.	"Thawuthisa Pure"	Rodney Warnakula
2.	"Wiyan Dore Kal Balanne Ai"	Harshana Madava
3.	"Mal Pipila"	Senanayake Weraliyadda, Nanda Malini
