= Mahindagamanaya =

- title card
- Sinhala: මහින්දාගමනය
- Directed by: Sanath Abeysekara
- Written by: Sanath Abeysekara
- Produced by: -
- Starring: Jeevan Kumaratunga; Dilhani Ekanayake; Roshan Ranawana
- Cinematography: Channa Deshapriya
- Edited by: Ravindra Guruge
- Music by: Rohana Weerasinghe
- Distributed by: Rithma and CEL Theatres
- Release date: 18 May 2011
- Country: Sri Lanka
- Language: Sinhala
- Budget: 600 Million LKR

Mahindagamanaya (Sinhala: මහින්දාගමනය) is a 2011 Sri Lankan Sinhala historical film directed by Sanath Abeysekara and produced by Dr. Daminda Upali Fernando. It stars Jeevan Kumaratunga, Dilhani Ekanayake in lead roles along with Roshan Ranawana and Roshan Pilapitiya. Music composed by Rohana Weerasinghe. The film was released on 18 May with the 2600th celebration of Sambuddhathva Jayanthiya. It is the 1165th Sri Lankan film in the Sinhala cinema. The film was produced with a budget of 600 million rupees.

== Cast ==
- Jeevan Kumaratunga as King Devanampiyatissa
- Dilhani Ekanayake as Queen Ramadatta
- Roshan Pilapitiya as Minister Aritta
- Roshan Ranawana as Prince Mahanaga
- Oshadi Hewamadduma as Queen Anula
- Uddika Premarathna as Seru
- Rex Kodippili as King Ashoka
- Hemasiri Liyanage as Mantha
- Anula Bulathsinhala as Mantha's wife
- Jayani Senanayake
- Udayanthi Kulatunga as Isikili
- G.R Perera as Chapman of King's House
- Duleeka Marapana as Magani
- Gnananga Gunawardena as Naga Kovil chanter
- Chinthaka Kulatunga as Dikkanda Senevi
- D.B. Gangodathenna as Devil house chanter
- Kumara Thirimadura as Ilanganaga
- Lakshman Mendis as Chief Priest
- Sanet Dikkumbura as Kali Pabbatha
- Hemal Thirimanne as Bhanduka Upasaka

== Soundtrack ==
No.	Title	Singer(s)	Length
1.	"Sethata Apata"	Amarasiri Peiris
2.	"Sansare Me Bara"	Uresha Ravihari, Karunarathna Divulgane
3.	"Wanapasa Malwatha"	Nanda Malini
4.	"Samindu Wadinawa Bo"	Uresha Ravihari

== Awards ==
- 2012 Derana Lux Film Festival Award for the Best Upcoming Actress - Udayanthi Kulatunga
- 2012 Derana Lux Film Festival Award for the Best Lyrics - Rev. Pallegama Hemarathna for song Sansare Barapodi
- Best director for 2600 Sambuddhathwa Jayanthiya by NFC - Sanath Abeysekara

== See also ==
- List of Asian historical drama films
