= Suba Theraniyo =

- Sinhala: සුබා තෙරණියෝ
- Directed by: Sumith Kumara
- Written by: Priyal Weerasingha
- Based on: Buddhist stories
- Produced by: S.A.S Entertainments
- Starring: Ruwangi Rathnayake; Roshan Ranawana; Sriyantha Mendis
- Cinematography: Ayeshmantha Hettiarachchi
- Edited by: Shan Alwis
- Music by: Rohana Weerasinghe
- Production company: Dil Films
- Distributed by: EAP Theatres
- Release date: 15 May 2019
- Country: Sri Lanka
- Language: Sinhala

Suba Theraniyo (Sinhala: සුබා තෙරණියෝ), theatrically as Jivakambavanika Hewath Suba Theraniyo, is a 2019 Sri Lankan Sinhala Buddhist epic biographical film directed by Sumith Kumara and co-produced by Bisara Chanakya and Ananda Samarasinghe for S.A.S Entertainments. It stars Ruwangi Rathnayake and Roshan Ranawana in lead roles along with Sriyantha Mendis and Dilhani Ekanayake. Music composed by Rohana Weerasinghe. It is the 1331st Sri Lankan film in the Sinhala cinema.

The film was released on Vesak Poya Day and to celebrate the 1562nd Sambuddhatva jayanthiya. The film has been screened in some Buddhist temples as well. The film was shown free for children under the age of 12.

== Plot ==
The film is based on the life of prominent Buddhist nun Subha who delivered 34 Therigathas.

== Cast ==
- Ruwangi Rathnayake as Suba Therani 'Suba'
- Roshan Ranawana as Nanda
- Sriyantha Mendis as Suba's father
- Dilhani Ekanayake as Sumana, Suba's mother
- Mahinda Pathirage as Dheeraka
- Udayanthi Kulatunga as Nandaa
- Nimal Pallewatte as Nanda's father
- Thilini Perera as Suparna
- Kumara Wanduressa
- Manik Perera
- Ranjith Naotunna as Astrologer
- Ashika Mathasinghe as Maha Therani

== Songs ==
The film consists with two songs.

No.	Title	Lyrics	Singer(s)	Length
1.	"Niwe Niwe Keles Gini"	Sunil Ariyaratne	Nanda Malini
2.	"Enu Menavi Subha"	Sunil Ariyaratne	Dumal Warnakulasooriya
