= Adaraye Namayen =

Adaraye Namayen ආදරයේ නාමයෙන්
- Directed by: A. R. Sorriyan; N. Nathan
- Written by: Nishantha Weerasingha
- Produced by: S. Raja; A. Raja
- Starring: Roshan Ranawana; Kishani Alanki; Shan Gunathilake
- Cinematography: R.A. Mohan
- Edited by: Anthony. R and S.P Ahamed
- Music by: Bathiya and Santhush
- Distributed by: EAP Films
- Release date: 21 November 2008
- Country: Sri Lanka
- Language: Sinhala

Adaraye Namayen (Feel My Love) (Sinhala: 'ආදරයේ නාමයෙන්') is a 2008 Sri Lankan Sinhala romantic drama film co-directed by Indian filmmaker A. R. Sorriyan and Sri Lankan filmmaker N. Nathan and co-produced by S. Raja and A. Raja. It stars Roshan Ranawana, Kishani Alanki and Shan Gunathilake in lead roles along with Sanath Gunathilake and Rajitha Hiran. It's a remake of 2004 Telugu movie Arya starring Allu Arjun. The music was composed by Bathiya and Santhush.

== Cast ==
- Roshan Ranawana as Roshan
- Kishani Alanki as Duleeka
- Shan Gunathilake as Ajith
- Sanath Gunathilake
- Tharaka Danthanarayana
- Nirosha Maddumage
- Rajitha Hiran

== Soundtrack ==
The film also features a song titled "Feel My Love" like the original but to a different tune.

No.	Title	Singer(s)	Length
1.	"Oya Mage Nam"	Bathiya and Santhush
2.	"Hodata Math Una Bambara Patikka"	Samitha Mudunkotuwa, Iraj Weeraratne
3.	"Hitha Nabara Thaleta"	Bathiya and Santhush
4.	"Feel My Love"	Bathiya and Santhush
5.	"Maa Neth"	Rajkumar, Umaria Sinhawansa, Waruna Madushanka, Manusha Gamage
