= Goree (film) =

2019 Sri Lankan film

- Sinhala: ගෝරි
- Directed by: Harsha Udakanda
- Produced by: Hiruna Films
- Starring: Aryan Kularatne; Sriyantha Mendis
- Cinematography: Mahesh Karunarathne (cinematographer)
- Music by: Niroshan Dreams
- Distributed by: MPI Theaters
- Release date: 6 June 2019
- Country: Sri Lanka
- Language: Sinhala

Goree (Sinhala: ගෝරි) is a 2019 Sri Lankan Sinhala action-thriller film directed by Harsha Udakanda and produced by Nishantha Jayawardena for Hiruna Films. It stars Aryan Kularatne in debut acting with Sriyantha Mendis in lead roles along with Roshan Ranawana and Rajitha Hiran. Music composed by Niroshan Dreams. It is the 1333rd Sri Lankan film in the Sinhala cinema. The film is influenced by the Indian Tamil films Theri and Vedalam.

The film marks as the first film production by MPI Theaters.

== Cast ==
- Kelum Aryan Kularathne as Inspector Adeesha Ranasinghe
- Pahandi Nethara as Shanaya Baby
- Rajitha Hiran as Sargent Silva
- Roshan Ranawana as Christho
- Sriyantha Mendis as Minister
- Teena Shanell Fernando as Hiruni
- Vinu Udani Siriwardhana as Indu
- Anuj Ranasinghe as Desmond
- Kumara Ranepura as Main Thug
- Pubudu Chathuranga as Disabled Ex-cop
- Chathura Perera as School principal
- Jayarathna Galagedara
- Mahesh Randeniya
- Harindu Waruna
- Sanet Dikkumbura as Chathurika's father
- Chamila Gamage

== Music ==
The song "Hinci Pinchi Hawa" is reused from "Eena Meena Teeka" from Theri. The song "Helana" is inspired from "Halena" from Iru Mugan.
