= Face to Face (2019 Sri Lankan film) =

- Sinhala: ෆේස් ටු ෆේස්
- Directed by: Harsha Udakanda
- Written by: Harsha Udakanda
- Produced by: HU Films; Flash Entertainments
- Starring: Roshan Ranawana; Sriyantha Mendis; Dineth De Silva; Oshadi Himasha; Amila Karunanayake
- Cinematography: Mahesh Karunaratne
- Edited by: Thiwanka Amarasiri
- Music by: Niroshan Dreams
- Release date: 22 November 2019
- Country: Sri Lanka
- Language: Sinhala

Face to Face (Sinhala: ෆේස් ටු ෆේස්) is a 2019 Sri Lankan Sinhala action thriller film directed by Harsha Udakanda and co-produced by Shermal Dilshan and Sahan Abeywardane for HU Films and Flash Entertainments. It stars Roshan Ranawana and Dineth De Silva in lead roles along with Sriyantha Mendis and Oshadi Himasha. Music composed by Niroshan Dreams.

The film has received mixed reviews from critics.

== Cast ==
- Roshan Ranawana as Rose
- Dineth De Silva as Iresh
- Sriyantha Mendis as Rose's father
- Oshadi Himasha as Amaya
- Amila Karunanayake as Police inspector
- Rohani Weerasinghe as Amaya's mother
- Ashika Mathasinghe as Doctor
- Rajitha Hiran as Mahesh
- D.B. Gangodathenna
- Shehani Perera
- Wilman Sirimanne as Driver Jalal
- Kumara Ranepura
- Jayarathna Galagedara
- Kumara Waduressa

== Soundtrack ==
The film consists with two songs.

No.	Title	Lyrics	Singer(s)	Length
1.	"Raave"	Denzil Nugegoda	Ashan Fernando, Ayomi Perera
2.	"Loku Kam"	Ridma Jayawardena	Ashan Fernando, Ayomi Perera
