= President Super Star =

- Promotional poster
- Sinhala: ප්‍රසිඩන්ට් සුපර් ස්ටාර්
- Directed by: Udayakantha Warnasuriya
- Written by: Udayakantha Warnasuriya
- Produced by: U Creations
- Starring: Mahendra Perera; Sriyantha Mendis; Gihan Fernando; Isuru Lokuhettiarachchi; Priyantha Seneviratne
- Cinematography: Jayanath Gunawardena
- Edited by: Pravin Jayaratne
- Music by: Mahesh Denipitiya
- Distributed by: CEL Theaters
- Release date: 25 October 2019
- Country: Sri Lanka
- Language: Sinhala

President Super Star (Sinhala: ප්‍රසිඩන්ට් සුපර් ස්ටාර්) is a 2019 Sri Lankan Sinhala political comedy film directed and produced by Udayakantha Warnasuriya for U Creations. It stars ensemble cast of veteran and young artists including Isuru Lokuhettiarachchi in lead role along with Mahendra Perera, Sriyantha Mendis, Gihan Fernando, Priyantha Seneviratne and Srimal Wedisinghe in supportive roles. Music composed by Mahesh Denipitiya.

The film received mixed reviews from critics. However, the film was a box-office bomb and failed to earn the production charges.

== Cast ==
=== Main cast ===
- Srimal Wedisinghe as Kelum Devasurendra
- Isuru Lokuhettiarachchi as Asela Ranaweera
- Mahendra Perera as Vijitha Mapalagama
- Sriyantha Mendis as Dasharaj Dharmapala
- Priyantha Seneviratne as Priyantha Alawirathna
- Gihan Fernando as Program host
- Ajith Weerasinghe as Jagath Saparamadu
- Tharindi Fernando as Dilanka, Asela's wife

=== Supportive cast ===
- W. Jayasiri as Minister
- Pubudu Chathuranga as Lichchawi King
- Roshan Ranawana as Lichchawi King
- Anuj Ranasinghe as Lichchawi King
- Sanath Gunathilake as Judge Daham Daranagama
- Ashan Dias as Mad president
- Gayathri Dias as Kelum's wife
- Wilson Gunaratne as J.R. Jayawardena dummy
- Rathna Lalani Jayakody as Samanthika
- Janaka Kumbukage as ISIS leader
- Sampath Tennakoon as Janadhipathi
- Sarath Chandrasiri as Police media spokesman
- Jayalal Rohana as Reporter
- Ananda Wickramage as Program coordinator
- Lal Kularatne as Reporter
- Shyam Fernando as Lawyer
- Bimal Jayakody as Lawyer
- Richard Manamudali as Reporter
- Saman Hemarathna as Reporter
- Sando Harris as Film director
- Sampath Jayaweera as Police inspector
- Suranga Satharasinghe as Reporter
- Sarath Kulanga as Journalist

=== Multiple roles playing cast ===
- Dharmapriya Dias
- Lucky Dias
- Giriraj Kaushalya
- Palitha Silva
- Mihira Sirithilaka
- Nilmini Tennakoon
- Kumara Thirimadura
- Rodney Warnakula
- Ravindra Yasas
- Ariyasena Gamage
- Hemantha Iriyagama
- Anura Bandara Rajaguru
- Chathura Perera
- Buddhika Rambukwella
- Jeevan Handunnetti
- Saman Almeida
- Dimuthu Chinthaka
- Boniface Jayasantha
- Wasantha Wittachchi
- Kumari Senaratne
- Kumara Wanduressa
- Harry Wimalasena
- Sajeewa Malmala Arachchi
- Teena Shanell Fernando in item song

== Songs ==
No.	Title	Lyrics	Singer(s)	Length
1.	"Saara Sobawata"	Kelum Srimal	Shyaman Dangamuwa
