= Kumara Thirimadura =

Sri Lankan dramatist and singer

Kumara Thirimadura කුමාර තිරිමාදුර
- Born: Thirimadura Upula Kumara de Zoysa; April 17, 1969 (age 57); Moratuwa, Colombo, Sri Lanka
- Education: Prince of Wales College, Moratuwa
- Occupations: Actor, Journalist, Filmmaker, Producer, Singer, Screen Play Writer
- Years active: 1987–present
- Spouse: Thushara Thirimadura
- Children: Amanda Thirimadura; Suchetha Thirimadura
- Awards: Best Actor In A Supporting Role; Best Screenwriter

Thirimadura Upula Kumara de Zoysa, popularly known as Kumara Thirimadura (Sinhala: කුමාර තිරිමාදුර; born April 17, 1969) is an actor in Sri Lankan cinema, stage drama and television. He is an actor, singer, filmmaker and journalist by profession. He is considered one of five actors who have dominated the Sri Lankan Stage by critics.

== Early career ==
He was born on 17 April 1969, in Rawathawatta, Moratuwa as the sixth child of the family with seven siblings. His father Thirimadura Rantin de Silva worked in the Sri Lanka Ports Authority. His mother Jothimuni Malini Miureen Perera worked as a cashier in a restaurant. He has four elder sisters - Sandya, Udaya, Ramya, Soumya and one elder brother, Kosala, one younger sister Bhagya and one younger brother Chamila. His sister Sandya died in April 2022. Thirimadura is a past student of Prince of Wales College, Moratuwa.

He won many awards at school level through many theatre works, which gave him boost to the career. But, before turning in to acting career, he worked 14 years as a journalist of Divaina Newspaper. His journalist career stood even after the acting, but he allocated full-time towards acting as his profession. Tissa Gunawardana was his first teacher in drama and theater. Thirimadura first appeared in Street theatres directed by Gamini Haththotuwegama, while he had his first stage play Sakalajana by Dhamma Jagoda.

== Acting career ==
Thirimadura has acted in about 90 stage plays, 58 films and several tele dramas. Nowadays he is seen in popular stage plays like Suba Saha Yasa, Balloth Ekka Be, Balloth Ekka Be 2, Charithe Horu Aran, Ko Kukko, Nari Burathi, Ang Awoo, and Deiyoth Danne Ne. Along with Gihan Fernando, Thirimadura engaged in a stage play Giha Saha Kuma.

While working on with theatre works and journalism, his fellow mate Jayantha Chandrasiri invited him to take part in his teledrama Akala Sandhya, which is Thirimadura's first television screen. Since then, he acted more than 50 teledramas across genre including some notable roles in the serials: Paba, Katu Imbula, Ataka Nataka, Isuru Sangramaya and Hendewa.

As a television host, Thirimadura presented program Maarai Hirai telecasted on TV Derana and program Rasoghaya telecasting on Siyatha TV accompany with Mihira Sirithilaka. On ITN, he currently presents the program called Thirimadura Oba Amathai.

Thirimadura started his film career with Julietge Bumikawa back in 1998, directed by Jackson Anthony. Through that, he performed many dramatic and comedy roles in more than 35+ films up to 2018. Apart from acting, he was also the Production Manager of film Sonduru Dadabima, released in 2003 and screenplay writer of film Thanha Rathi Ranga. The role in this film highly praised by the critics and was a commercial hit as well. He along with Sarath Kothalawala won the Award for the Best Screenplay at Derana Lux Film Awards in 2014 for Thanha Rathi Ranga movie. His first cinema direction came through Newspaper co-directed with Kothalawala was released on 29 June 2020.

In March 2021, a film festival featuring five films starring Thirimadura will be held for five days at the Liberty Hall, Kollupitiya. The festival is named as the "uncrowned prince's felt cinematic procession". In 2024, he produced his maiden theater production Sudu Andagena Horu Avidin staged at 3.30pm and 6.30 pm on Tuesday, October 22 at the Elphinstone Theatre, Colombo 10.

== Discography ==
Thirimadura is an A-grade singer at Sri Lanka Radio Corporation. Though he has not released his solo songs until recently, he has said that he had to sacrifice his early career entirely for the drama and films. He is a die-hard fan of Victor Rathnayake.

Thirimadura released his first solo visual song Ae Mata Adarei in June 2016. He also appeared in the music video of song Bodima by Theekshana Anuradha.

On 31 March 2017, Thirimadura performed a musical show at Maharagama Youth Society Hall at 7pm. He titled his show as Kumaraya Man - Deveni Gamana. At the show, he launched his 14-songs music album Ae Mata Adarei as well.

=== Songs ===
Following list is the songs of Kumara Thirimadura.

- (01) Adannata Epa
- (02) Lapalu Dalu
- (03) Mata Asai
- (04) Paata Paata Mal Gode
- (05) Paalu Gathiya
- (06) Seethala Udaye
- (07) Me Udakki Kolama
- (08) Malabe Kiyu Kisiveku
- (09) Ae Mata Adarei
- (10) Man Boralle Ae Badulle

== Television ==
=== Notable television serials ===
- Adare Ahasa Tharam
- Adisi Nadiya
- Ahas Maliga
- Akaala Sandya
- Angani
- Bharyawo
- Dadakeli Arana
- Ethuma 1, 2
- Gaga Laga Gedara
- Gini Avi Saha Gini Keli
- Giri Shikara Meda
- Guru Geethaya
- Hadawathe Kathawa
- Handewa
- Herda Sakshiya
- Ingi Bingi
- Isuru Sangramaya
- Jodu Gedara
- Katu Imbula
- Kota Uda Mandira
- Labendiye
- Maama Haa Ma
- Nattukkarayo
- Nethaka Maayavee
- On Ataka Nataka
- Paba
- Pirimi Lamai
- Raja Kaduwa
- Ralla Weralata Adarei
- Ranga Soba
- Rathi Virathi
- Ron Soya
- Sabba Sakala Manaa
- Samanalunta Wedithiyanna
- Sanda Numba Nam
- Sapthambaraye Diga Dawasak
- Sapumali
- Sedona
- Senehasa Kaviyak
- Sidangana
- Sidu
- Sihina Puraya
- Sihina Tawuma
- Sihinayak Wage
- Sihini
- Siri Sirimal
- Three-wheel Malli
- Veeduru Mal
- Visi Eka
- Walawettuwa
- Wasuli Kanda

== Author work ==
He published the autobiographical book Mage Jeewithe in 2019, which also granted as an educational book by Sri Lanka Education Department. He also wrote the book Karaliye Rasa Katha which was started as a paper column note.

== Awards ==
- Best Actor award - State Drama Festival - 2005
- Merit Award - Sumathi Awards - 2011
- Best Actor In A Supporting Role – Gamani - 1st Derana Film Award - 2012
- Best Screenplay Writer – Thanha Rathi Raga - 3rd Derana Lux Film Award - 2014
- Merit Award - Sumathi Awards - 2017
- Jury Award - Sumathi Awards - 2017
- Merit Award - Grahambell Wath Sithuwada - Raigam Tele'es - 2017
- Best Supporting Actor - Hiru Golden Film Awards - 2018

== Filmography ==
Key
†	Denotes films that have not yet been released

Year	Film	Role	Ref.
1998	Julietge Bhumikawa	Stage onlooker	
2003	Sonduru Dadabima	Arnold	
2005	Ira Madiyama	Checkpoint officer	
2005	Aksharaya		
2006	Sewwandi		
2007	Sikuru Hathe	Carpenter	
2008	Rosa Kale	Percy	
2008	Walapatala	uncredited role	
2008	Machan	Oaf	
2009	Ekamath Eka Rateka		
2009	Akasa Kusum	Karaoke client	
2009	Bindu	Saping	
2010	Uththara	Security officer	
2010	Suwanda Denuna Jeewithe	Guest appearance	
2010	Ira Handa Yata	Captain	
2011	Sinhawalokanaya	Mohothaa	
2011	Angara Dangara	Simon	
2011	Mahindagamanaya	Ilanganaga	
2011	King Hunther	Meththananda	
2011	Gamani	Sergeant Ranasinghe	
2013	Bomba Saha Rosa		
2013	Nikini Vassa		
2013	Ran Kevita 2	Supermarket thief	
2013	Seetha Man Awa		
2014	Parapura	Adopted father	
2014	Thanha Rathi Ranga	Wimal	
2014	Ko Mark No Mark	Mark's neighbour	
2014	Api Marenne Na	Mangala Pushpakumara	
2015	Lantin Singho	Wimale	
2016	Motor Bicycle	Three-wheel driver	
2016	Maya 3D	Maya's father	
2016	Sujatha Puthra	Mudalali	
2016	The Rainbow	Victor	
2017	Ali Kathawa	Gobila veddha	
2017	Dharmayuddhaya	PC Wimal	
2018	Porisadaya	Basnayake	
2018	Madhura Charika	Bus conductor	
2018	Yama Raja Siri	Yama Raja's assistant	
2018	Raigamayai Gampalayai	Gampalaya	
2018	Nidahase Piya DS	School teacher	
2018	Tawume Iskole	Siridasa	
2019	Weli Pawuru	Jayantha	
2019	President Super Star	Multiple characters	
2019	Reload	Sadasarana Mudalige Alapatha	
2020	Tsunami	Thovilakaru	
2020	Avilenasului		
2020	The Newspaper	Luvis	
2020	Miss Jenis	Match maker	
2021	Colombo	Michael	
2021	Nihada Sewaneli		
2021	Kawuruth Danne Na		
2021	Hathara Varan	Edward	
2022	Hithumathe Jeewithe	Sumathipala's father	
2023	Thaththa	Rathnapala	
2024	Weerya	Macho	
2024	Sihinayaki Adare	drunken person	
2024	Sinhabahu		
2024	Hora Uncle		
2024	Sri Siddha		
2026	Dharmayuddhaya 2	PC Wimal	
2026	Sargent Punchisoma	Arrogant drunken driver	
2026	O.I.C Gadafi		
TBA	Kondadeniye Hamuduruwo †		
TBA	Amuthu Gurukamak †		
TBA	Amuthu 3k †		
TBA	Dharmayuddhaya 3 †	PC Wimal	
