= Suwanda Denuna Jeewithe =

- Directed by: Dhammika Siriwardana
- Written by: Dhammika Siriwardana
- Starring: Pooja Umashankar; Roshan Ranawana; Pubudu Chathuranga; Sanath Gunathilake
- Cinematography: Jayanth Gunawardhane
- Edited by: Ajith Ramanayake
- Music by: Mahesh Denipitiya
- Production company: EAP circuit cinemas
- Release date: 11 June 2010
- Country: Sri Lanka
- Language: Sinhala

Suwanda Denuna Jeewithe is a 2010 Sinhala-language romantic musical film written and directed and produced by Dhammika Siriwardana. The film stars Roshan Ranawana and Pooja Umashankar in lead roles along with Gayathri Dias, Rex Kodippili, Himali Siriwardena and Pubudu Chathuranga.

Shooting of the film was commenced on 6 August 2008 in and around Nuwara Eliya, Badulla, Bandarawela, Welimada and Colombo.

== Plot ==
Ayeshmantha, owner of his father's business, falls in love with a girl named Rashi, only to find she is marrying. Saddened, Ayeshmantha loses interest in the family business and considers suicide. He leaves home only to find Rashmi in a train, who persuades him to not kill himself by jumping off the running train. Rashmi takes Ayeshmantha to live with her aunt.

Rashmi's aunts are suspicious of a would be love affair between Ayeshmantha and Rashmi, therefore disallowing Ayeshmantha to live there further. Rashmi breaks up with her fiancé. Meanwhile, Ayeshmantha decides to restore the family business.

Ayeshmantha decides to look for Rashmi. Her ex-boyfriend tells of the results of their relationships. Ayeshmantha decides to look for Rashmi, and encounters her in a churchyard, eventually leading to the development of their relationship.

== Cast ==
- Roshan Ranawana as Ayeshmantha, protagonist
- Pooja Umashankar as Rashmi, girl secretly in love with Ayeshmantha
- Gayathri Dias as Rashmi's aunt
- Ramani Siriwardana as Ayeshmantha's mother
- Srimal Wedisinghe as Rashmi's father
- Maureen Charuni as Rashmi's mother
- Rex Kodippili as Ayeshmantha's father
- Himali Siriwardena as Rukshi Siriwardena
- Pubudu Chathuranga as Prasad, Rashmi' ex boyfriend
- Sanath Gunathilake in minor role
- Raja Ganeshan as Ramayya
- Shanudrie Priyasad as Senuri
- Sandali Walikanna as Wenuri
- Richard Manamudali as PHI
- Sarath Kulanga as PHI
- Senat Dikkumbura as Begger
- Chithra Warakagoda as Prasad's mother
- Dilshani Perera as Prasad's sister
- Giriraj Kaushalya in cameo appearance
- Semini Iddamalgoda in cameo appearance

== Soundtrack ==
No.	Title	Lyrics	Singer(s)	Length
1.	"Mal Samanallu"	Kelum Srimal	Uresha Ravihari
2.	"Ron Suwanda Dena Mal"	Nilar N. Kasim	Uresha Ravihari, Shihan Mihiranga
3.	"Perada Mawu Sina"	Nilar N. Kasim	Shihan Mihiranga
4.	"Mada Sulanga"		Nirosha Virajini, Amila Perera
5.	"Sith Mal Hangum"	Nandana Wickramage	Uresha Ravihari, Shihan Mihiranga, Iresha Otam, Ruwan Hettiarachchi, Billy Fernando

== Release ==
The film was a commercial success, and helped Umashankar, who plays the role of Rashmi, rise in popularity. The soundtrack was successful as well.
