= Miss Jenis =

2020 Sri Lankan comedy drama film

- Sinhala: මිස් ජෙනිස්
- Directed by: Susiran De Silva
- Written by: Susiran De Silva
- Produced by: Walter Abeysundara
- Starring: Jayalath Manoratne; Giriraj Kaushalya; Jayalal Rohana; Duleeka Marapana
- Cinematography: Ayeshmantha Hettiarachchi
- Edited by: Megha Kavinda Colombage
- Music by: Lakshman Wijesekara
- Distributed by: Ridma Theaters
- Release date: 25 September 2020
- Country: Sri Lanka
- Language: Sinhala

Miss Jenis (Sinhala: මිස් ජෙනිස්) is a 2020 Sri Lankan Sinhala comedy drama film directed by Susiran De Silva and produced by Walter Abeysundara. It stars late Jayalath Manoratne in lead dual roles along with Giriraj Kaushalya, Jayalal Rohana and Duleeka Marapana in supportive roles. Music composed by Lakshman Wijesekara.

It is the debut cinema direction of Susiran de Silva, where he has produced several popular television serials earlier such as Manokaya and Isuru Yogaya. The film also marks the final lead role of maestro Jayalath Manoratne who died in early 2020. This is unique to Sinhala cinema as his one and only female character. However in 2019, Manoratne and his wife came to see the film when it was shown to the film exhibition boards even though he showed a slight illness at that time.

The film was officially released on 25 September 2020. However, the film had his special screening on 7 September 2020 at The Scope Film Festival which was held from 4-8 September at Scope Cinemas, Liberty Complex. It was filmed in Haputale, Hikkaduwa and Colombo areas. The film received mixed views from critics.

== Cast ==
- Jayalath Manoratne as Liyon aka 'Jenis'
- Giriraj Kaushalya as Karu
- Duleeka Marapana as Mrs. Makalanda
- Roshan Ranawana as Bhanuka, Liyon's son
- Jayalal Rohana as Christopher
- Udari Perera as Nimaya
- Kumara Thirimadura as Match maker
- Madani Malwaththa as Liyon's wife
- Wasantha Kumarasiri as Edward
- Angelo Sanjeev Barnes as Christopher's son
- Oshadi Himasha as Surangi, Liyon's daughter
- Kapila Samarakoon as Piyasiri
- Kumara Wanduressa as Security office chairman
- Nilanthi Gunawardena as Sheela
