= Roshan Ranawana =

Sri Lankan actor and model (born 1981)

Roshan Ranawana රොෂාන් රණවන
- Born: March 23, 1981 (age 45); Wattala, Sri Lanka
- Education: St. Joseph's College, Colombo
- Occupations: Model, actor
- Years active: 2006–present
- Height: 6 ft 1 in (1.85 m)
- Spouse: Kushlani Ranawana (m. 2014)
- Children: Minneth Ranawana
- Awards: Most popular actor
- Website: Official

Roshan Ranawana (Sinhala: රොෂාන් රණවන) (born 23 March 1981) is a Sri Lankan actor and model. Ranawana was awarded the most popular actors award at the Derana film awards in 2013.

Ranawana made his acting debut with Hiripoda Wessa (2006) and won a Presidential award for best upcoming actor for his performance. He played the lead role in several commercial successes such as Tharaka Mal (2007), Asai Mang Piyabanna (2007), Rosa Kale (2008), Feel My Love (2008), Dancing Star (2009) and Suwanda Danuna Jeewithe (2010).

== Personal life ==
Roshan is married to his longtime partner Kushlani. The couple has one son, Minneth, born in 2019.

Ranawana is a devoted Buddhist and committed vegetarian. He also appeared in many Buddhist programs in TNL TV particularly about the vegetarian life. He is also an active humanitarian on preventing cancer around the country carrying accompany with Cancer Care Association.

== Modelling ==
Ranawana was a former travel executive by profession before entering acting. Shortly afterward, he was chosen as the model for Manhunt International China for 2002 and finished in seventh place. He participated in the Mr. World, UK and Grassim International, UK in 2003. He was the second runner-up in the Best Model of the World competition held in the same year in Turkey. He took eighth place in the Mr. International Singapore competition in 2006, and he won the Best National Costume in two pageants between 2003 and 2006.

== Acting career ==
Ranawana started his cinema career with the blockbuster teen romance movie Hiripoda Wassa directed by the Udayakantha Warnasuriya. He still remembers that the character Prageeth is his best stage character as well. In the later year, he won the Presidential Award for the best upcoming actor for his role in Hiripoda Wassa. He became a household name in the Sri Lankan film industry after the success of Hiripoda Wassa and Asai Man Piyambanna with south Indian actress Pooja Umashankar in 2007. This earned him the role of broadband ambassador for Sri Lanka Telecom (SLT). His second and third films, Tharaka Mal and Asai Mang Piyabanna, were released in 2007. Then, he acted more than 15 commercial and theoretical films across many genre, particularly as the lead actor. In 2013, he won the award for the most popular actor at Derana Film Awards for the role in the film Sri Siddhartha Gautama.

Ranawana made his television acting with the soap opera Vasuda which was telecasted on Sirasa TV. Then he acted only few television serials due to busy schedule as a cinema actor. In 2008, he participated in the first season of the Sri Lankan reality dance show Sirasa Dancing Stars, broadcast by Sirasa TV and finished in third place. He is one of the judges in the popular beauty contest Derana Veet Miss Sri Lanka for Miss World on Derana TV. In 2011, he launched his official website at a ceremony held in Ceylon Continental Hotel, Colombo. In addition, he appeared in his own music video, Neela Neth, with Steven Krishan in 2010.

=== Selected television serials ===
- Sanda Nodutu Sanda
- Kawya
- Sidangana
- Ran Samanalayo

== Filmography ==
Key
| † | Denotes films that have not yet been released |

| Year | Film | Role | Ref. |
|---|---|---|---|
| 2006 | Hiripoda Wassa | Prageeth | |
| 2007 | Tharaka Mal | Mahasen | |
| 2007 | Asai Man Piyabanna | Praveen | |
| 2008 | Rosa Kale | Akalanka | |
| 2008 | Adaraye Namayen | Roshan | |
| 2009 | Dancing Star | Sudesh | |
| 2010 | Suwanda Denuna Jeewithe | Ayeshmantha | |
| 2011 | Challengers | Kishan | |
| 2011 | Mahindagamanaya | Prince Mahanaga | |
| 2012 | Kusa Pabha | Prince Jayampathi | |
| 2012 | Super Six | Aravinda | |
| 2013 | Sri Siddhartha Gautama | Prince Nanda | |
| 2015 | Spandana | Sithum | |
| 2015 | Maharaja Ajasath | | |
| 2016 | Ulath Ekai Pilath Ekai | Wanathe Roshan | |
| 2016 | The Rainbow | Roshan | |
| 2019 | Suba Theraniyo | Nanda | |
| 2019 | Goree | Christho | |
| 2019 | President Super Star | Lichchawi King | |
| 2019 | Face to Face | Rose | |
| 2020 | Miss Jenis | Bhanuka | |
| 2021 | Nihada Sewaneli | | |
| 2022 | Ruhire | Sampath | |
| 2023 | Rider | Sadesh | |
| 2023 | Lockdown | | |
| 2025 | Ice Cream | | |
| 2026 | Adaraneeya Tharuwak | Cameo appearance | |
| 2026 | Eda Raa | Cameo appearance | |
| TBA | Secret of the Rose † | | |
| 2022 | Nimi | Richard | |
| TBA | Deva Matha † | | |
