= Awanthi Aponsu =

Sri Lankan actress

- අවන්ති අපොන්සු
- Born: Goniya Malimage Awanthi Aponsu; 18 June 1959 (age 67); Nuwara Eliya, Central Province, Sri Lanka
- Occupations: Television and film actress
- Years active: 1983–present
- Spouse: Yagath Jayasuriya
- Children: Kavya Jayasuriya
- Relatives: Jayasekara Aponsu; Gamini Aponsu

Goniya Malimage Awanthi Aponsu, popularly known as Awanthi Aponsu (Sinhalese: ගෝනියා මාලිමගේ අවන්ති අපොන්සු; born 18 June 1959) is a Sri Lankan actress known for her extensive work in supporting roles of teledramas, films and stage plays. She is the younger sister of popular Sri Lankan actor Jayasekara Aponsu.

== Personal life ==
Aponsu was born in Nuwara Eliya, Sri Lanka, where she attended Gamini Central College. She lived with her mother, two younger sisters, and younger brother in the Magasthota village area of Nuwara Eliya; her father, and brother Jayasekara had moved to Colombo at this time. Her uncle, Edwin Peiris, was a stage play director in Nuwara Eliya, who was acquainted with Rohana Weerasinghe. As a child, she had dreamed of acting, but thought it was out of reach due to her extreme shyness growing up. She instead wanted to become a nurse. It was not until she finished up her studies and moved to Colombo herself in 1979 that she'd pursue acting. She started her acting career in stage plays under the tutelage of her brother Jayasekara. She practiced for six months, and made her stage debut with Jayantha Ketagoda.

She is married to Yagath Jayasuriya, an ex-Air Force officer. Many of Aponsu's brothers and sisters, including Jayasekara Aponsu, Gamini Aponsu, and Nirmada Aponsu, are also famous actors. Aponsu is a Theravada Buddhist.

Aponsu's daughter, Kavya Jayasuriya, was born on 22 May 1992. Kavya married Pahan Thillakaratne on 14 November 2018. The wedding was attended by Maithripala Sirisena, who was President of Sri Lanka at the time, as well as his brother, businessman Dudley Sirisena, who are close friends of Aponsu's husband. The couple now resides in Victoria, Australia, and gave birth to their first child, a daughter, on 16 January 2025.

== Filmography ==
=== Film ===
Year	Film	Role
1983	Thunhiri Mal	
1984	Dadayama	Rathmali's friend
1984	Podi Ralahamy	Crying girl
1984	Batti	
1984	Birinda	
1985	Adarayaka Mahima	Nadeeka
1985	Varsity Kella	Nali
1987	Podi Vijay	
1995	Ayoma	
1999	Rae Rae	
2012	Mouse	Alagiyawanna's wife
2016	Paththini	Devanthi
2017	Dharmayuddhaya	Rani's mother

== Awards ==
Award	Year	Category	Result
Natya Sammana	1983	Best Actress	Won
