= Dilup Gabadamudalige =

Kala Suri Diliup Gabadamudalige is a Sri Lankan pianist, keyboardist, composer, lyricist and producer. He is the pioneer in Computer/MIDI Music in Sri Lanka.

Educated at Royal College, Colombo, where he was a pioneer member of the Royal College Band. A prize winner in Piano from the Trinity College of Music, he was the leader of the Junior Symphony Orchestra of Sri Lanka. However in 1979 he joined Air Lanka as an aircraft technician and underwent training at the Air Force Academy, China Bay, Trincomalee and went on to work as an Aircraft Technician at the Colombo Airport in Katunayake until he left the field in 1985 to take up full-time music.

He was the music director of Young Asia Television (YA TV) from its inception till December 2003 and pioneered the Institute of Computer Music Technology in 2002. For his contribution in the field of music, he was awarded the title Kala Suri by the government of Sri Lanka. Diliup was also awarded the first Lylie Godrich Memorial Award for Contributions to the Western Music Industry of Sri Lanka by the Govt. in 2011.
