= Kingsley De Silva =

Professor Kingsley De Silva

Personal details
- Born: 26 October 1932 Sri Lanka
- Died: 3 April 2006 (aged 73) Colombo, Sri Lanka
- Profession: Obstetrics and gynaecology

Professor Mapalagama Liyanage Neville Kingsley Pierre De Silva FRCS, FRCOG (Great Britain) FCOG (SL) (October 26, 1932 in Kandana, Sri Lanka – April 3, 2006) was a Sri Lankan obstetrician and gynaecologist who served as president of the Sri Lanka College of Obstetricians & Gynaecologists in 1985–87. He was Consultant Obstetrician and Gynaecologist at the Sri Jayewardenepura General Hospital from 1984. He was also a senior lecturer at the University of Colombo, and subsequently Professor of Obstetrics and Gynaecology at the University of Peradeniya (1976–1984).

The University of Peradeniya has subsequently awarded the "Kingsley de Silva Prize for Obstetrics & Gynaecology".
