= Ganewatta =

Ganewatta ගනේවත්ත
- Town
- Location within Sri Lanka
- Coordinates: 7.650331°N 80.342832°E
- Country: Sri Lanka
- Province: North Western Province
- District: Kurunegala District
- Time zone: UTC+5:30 (Sri Lanka Standard Time)
- Area code: 037

Ganewatta (Sinhala: ගනේවත්ත) is a town in the North Western Province of Sri Lanka.

It is the site of a medicinal plant garden, operated by Department of National Botanic Gardens. The garden is the home to a collection of tropical plants that are used for medicinal purposes. The garden is 21 ha (52 acres) in size, however only 8.9 ha (22 acres) is planted with medicinal plants and the remainder of the site is used for coconut cultivation.

== Transport ==
Ganewatta railway station, is located on the Northern line, and is operated by Sri Lanka Railways.

== See also ==
- Railway stations in Sri Lanka
- Transport in Sri Lanka
