= Ashanthi De Alwis =

Sri Lankan rapper, singer and songwriter

Ashanthi
- Born: Colombo, Sri Lanka
- Genres: Hip hop, crunk&B, folkhop
- Occupations: Rapper, singer, songwriter
- Years active: 2002–present
- Labels: Sony Music, Universal Music, M Entertainments
- Formerly of: Ashanthi n' Ranidu
- Website: ashanthi.com

Ashanthi De Alwis (Sinhala:අශාන්ති ද අල්විස්), known simply as Ashanthi, is a Sri Lankan rapper, singer and songwriter. She is the only Sri Lankan female rapper who signed with international record labels Sony Music and Universal Music in 2006. She began her career as a rapper with BnS, and continued that role after achieving solo success.

== Career ==
Ashanthi's first major label album was as half of the duo Ashanthi n' Ranidu, with the album Oba Magemai released in 2002 through M Entertainments. Her debut solo album Sandawathuren was released in 2006. This was the first hip hop solo album to be released by a Sri Lankan female. Her general style of music is ethnic hip hop with massive market appeal. Sandawathuren was sung in Sinhala, with the exception of two English songs.

Ashanthi has toured internationally in countries throughout Europe, North America, Australasia and Asia. In 2008, Dialog signed up Ashanthi to be a brand ambassador for their pre-paid brand KIT.

At the 2013 Derana Music Video Awards, Ashanthi won the award for 'Best Hip Hop Video' for Alawanthiyak. She also recorded the 11th anniversary jingles for Y FM, Sri Lanka in November 2016. From 2020 onwards she joined the widely popular The Voice teens (Sri Lanka) as a coach.

Ashanthi released her first English Language Album 'Rock the World' in August 2013, aiming for an international market. The lead single off the album was 'Let's Give Peace a Chance', which was also recorded in Sinhala with additional vocals by Benny Dayal.

== Television shows ==
Year	Title	Channel	Language	Role
2020	The Voice Teens Sri Lanka(Season 1)	Sirasa TV	Sinhala	Coach - Herself
2023	Derana Dream Star(Season 11)	TV Derana	Sinhala	Judge - Herself

== Discography ==
=== Albums ===
- Oba Magemai (with Ranidu), Sony Music, 2002
- Sandawathuren, Universal Music, 2006
- Rock the World, Universal Music, 2013
- Daas Panawa, Universal Music, 2014
