= Jayasekara Aponsu =

Sri Lankan actor

Jayasekara Aponsu ජයසේකර අපෝන්සු
- Born: Goniya Malimage Jayasekara Aponsu; 23 February 1951 (age 75); Nuwara Eliya, Sri Lanka
- Occupations: Dramatist, Director, Actor, Comedian, Script writer
- Years active: 1973 – present
- Spouses: Jayanthi Aponsu (m. 1978; div. 2018) Sujatha Priyadarshani (m. 2018)
- Children: Thamira Aponsu

Goniya Malimage Jayasekara Aponsu (born 23 February 1951: Sinhala:ජයසේකර අපෝන්සු), popularly known as Jayasekara Aponsu, is an actor in Sri Lankan cinema, theatre, and television as well as a director and script writer.

== Personal life ==
Jayasekara Aponsu was born on 23 February 1951 in Nuwara Eliya. Aponsu is married to Jayanthi Aponsu and they have one son, Thamira Aponsu. Aponsu first met his wife during a drama school conducted by him at Mount Lavinia in the 1970s. They married in 1978 after a love affair. Due to many circumstances and money problems, he abandoned and missed his wife and son for 30 years of time, until they united in 2016 March. Though he abandoned them, his sisters and brothers came closer to his wife and son in that crucial thirty years. However, he married Sujatha Priyadarshani in 2018, who is 42 years younger than Aponsu.

His sister Awanthi Aponsu is also a popular actress.

== Career ==
He started his stage drama career with a 12 award-winning drama Pathale Soladaduwo. Some of his most popular stage dramas are Thatu, 31, Eri, Guru, Kira, Maha Saha Shen, Sako, Samanallu, Hathare Wattuwa, Giju, Proda, Iri, Tharuwa Vikine, Horu, and Madame Shoba staged more than 100 times throughout the country. Aponsu established a drama theatre school Shilpa Kala Guru Sewana for teaching young artists as well.

His most popular teledrama acting came through the comedy play Nonavaruni Mahathwaruni as Nihal Karapitiya. He got the character after a tragic accident killed actor Granville Rodrigo, who initially played the character. His first direction in teledrama came through Sil, which was a drama, horror, fantasy telecasted on Swarnavahini in 2007. In 2021, he directed the mini serial Uma.

Aponsu started his cinema career in 1973 with the film Suhada Pathuma. Since then, he acted more than 35 film across three decades. His first direction came through the film Ra Ru in 1999.

=== Selected television serials ===
- Class Sinhala Class
- Ingammaruwa
- Giju
- Katu Pawura
- Madam Shobha
- Mati Kadulu
- Night Learners
- Nonavaruni Mahathwaruni
- Sabawen Awasarai
- Sangeethe
- Suraduthiyo
- Thoorya
- Uma

== Filmography ==
- No. denotes the Number of Sri Lankan film in the Sri Lankan cinema.

=== As actor ===
| Year | No. | Film | Role |
|---|---|---|---|
| 1973 | 271 | Suhada Pathuma | Shop worker |
| 1973 | 277 | Sinawai Inawai | |
| 1975 | 327 | Sadhana | |
| 1976 | 350 | Hulawali | Cart driver ("Kulagederin") |
| 1977 | 361 | Sudu Paraviyo | Ranaa |
| 1977 | 364 | Hariyanakota Ohoma Thamai | |
| 1977 | 374 | Sikuru Dashawa | |
| 1977 | 379 | Tom Pachaya | |
| 1978 | 395 | Selenage Walauwa | Student |
| 1978 | 396 | Saara | |
| 1979 | 410 | Samanmali | Servant |
| 1979 | 421 | Raan Kurullo | Tikira |
| 1979 | 422 | Wasanthaya Dawasak | Sarath |
| 1980 | 439 | Uthumaneni | |
| 1980 | 450 | Raktha | Gorasin's henchman |
| 1980 | 453 | Bambara Pahasa | |
| 1981 | 489 | Sathkulu Pauwa | Jaye |
| 1981 | 472 | Thawalama | |
| 1981 | 476 | Sayuru Thera | Benja |
| 1981 | 490 | Redi Thalla | |
| 1981 | 491 | Bandura Mal | |
| 1982 | 505 | Sandaa | |
| 1982 | 514 | Thani Tharuwa | |
| 1982 | 520 | Anuradha | also as screenwriter |
| 1982 | 517 | Pethi Gomara | Jokino |
| 1982 | 531 | Mihidum Sihina | |
| 1984 | 585 | Kakille Rajjuruwo | |
| 1984 | 601 | Batti | |
| 1984 | 607 | Birinda | |
| 1985 | 629 | Varsity Kella | |
| 1986 | 638 | Asipatha Mamai | Gamanayake |
| 1986 | 643 | Maldeniye Semion | |
| 1987 | 653 | Yugayen Yugayata | Jokino |
| 1990 | 707 | Pem Raja Dahana | Corporal Bandara. also as screenwriter |
| 1992 | 766 | Sayanaye Sihinaya | |
| 1999 | 909 | Re Ru | also as producer |
| 2001 | 948 | Jack and Jill | Master Jill |
| 2013 | 1195 | Seetha Man Awa | King Ravana. also as screenwriter |
| 2017 | 1286 | Sellam Nethnam Lellam | Robaa |
| 2022 | | Rashmi | Mr. Maannakkara |
| TBD | | Edath Dinum Adath Dinum | |

=== As director ===
- Re Ru - 1999
- Seetha Man Awa - 2013
- Tharu Soba - TBD
