= Jayalal Rohana =

Sri Lankan actor, dramatist and writer (1964–2021)

Jayalal Rohana ජයලාල් රෝහන
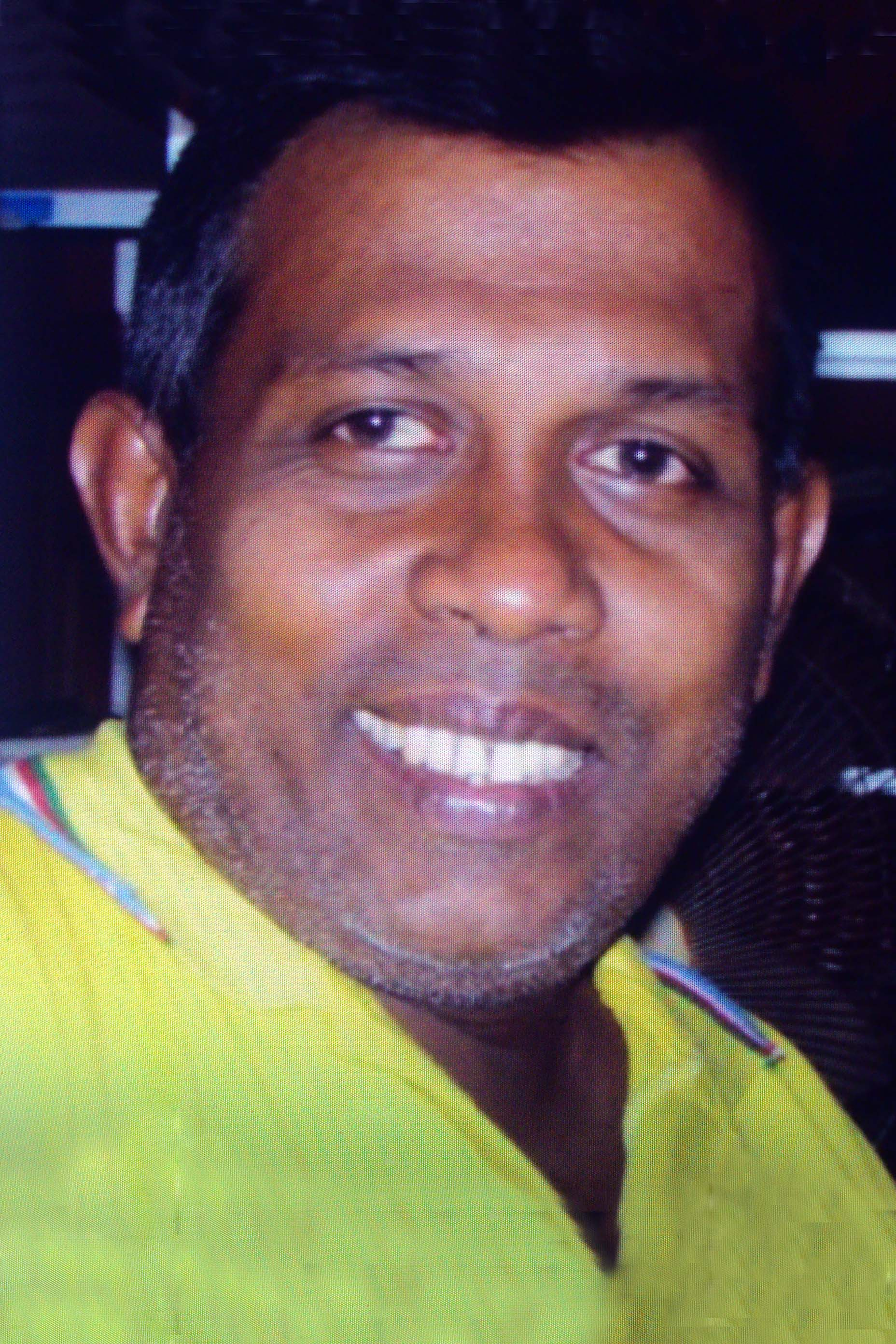
- Born: Maha Egodage Jayalal Rohana Perera; 1 November 1964; Colombo, Sri Lanka
- Died: 11 February 2021 (aged 56); Ragama, Sri Lanka
- Education: Ananda Sastralaya
- Alma mater: University of Peradeniya
- Occupations: Actor, director, writer, teacher
- Years active: 1976-2021
- Spouse: Menaka Shriyani
- Children: 2

Maha Egodage Jayalal Rohana Perera (Sinhala: ජයලාල් රෝහණ; 1 November 1964 – 11 February 2021), known as Jayalal Rohana, was a Sri Lankan actor who worked in Sri Lankan cinema, theatre and television. Considered a versatile figure in Sri Lankan entertainment, Rohana was also a writer, makeup artist, radio playwright and drama teacher who taught theatre to students as a freelance dramatist in Sri Lanka. He gained acclaim for his work in television after winning the Sumathi Award for Best Actor in for the role in Isuru Yogaya.

== Personal life ==
Rohana was born on 1 November 1964 in Colombo. He says that his father was the Treasurer of the Communist Party in Kotte. He studied at Ananda Sastralaya, Kotte and graduated with a Bachelor of Arts from the University of Peradeniya (External) in 2007, and also earned a Master's degree in Drama and Theater from the University of Kelaniya in 2009.

Rohana was married to Menaka Shriyani, and had a son and a daughter. He was left in critical condition in 2006, when he was hit by a train, and later survived a bomb blast that occurred near Maradana Railway Station.

Rohana was hospitalized again in December 2018 after suffering a heart attack. Rumours that he died at Ragama Hospital were refuted when Rohana posted a video on social media, confirming that he was alive. He died on 11 February 2021 from another heart attack at the Colombo North Teaching Hospital, Ragama. He was 56 years old. After his funeral, he was cremated at the Borella cemetery on 14 February.

== Career ==
In 1976 at the age of 13, Rohanaplayd a role in Muhudu Giya directed by Soma Perera in the All Island Inter-school Drama Competition that he says. He has associated few renowned directors in Sinhala drama, like Simon Navagattegama and Sugathapala de Silva. He acted in Navagattegama's play Named Gangawak Sapaththukabalak Saha Maranayak. In 1982 he attended an OCIC diploma course conducted by Fr. Ernest Poruthota. Then he experienced short time theatre workshop under Prof. Rudy Corrence from Belgium and A. G. Gunawardena at Goethe institute. In 1986 he performed in the stage play Hitler produced by Douglas Siriwardena.

He entered the television drama in 1986 and acted in many single episode dramas. For his play Loka in 1992, Jayalal received awards for Script and Best Actor at National Theater Awards. His major breakthrough in television came through the role "Muthumina" in serial Isuru Yogaya directed by Susiran de Silva. The serial was telecast on Rupavahini at 8.30 pm every Sunday. For the role, he also won the Sumathi Best Teledrama Actor Award at 2006 Sumathi Awards.

His maiden cinema acting came through 1995 film Ayoma, directed by Parakrama Niriella. Then he acted in few films such as Nimnayaka Hudakalawa, Tikiri Suwanda and Sinhawalokanaya. He also worked as a frequent resource personality in the television educational programs Doramadalawa and Television Iskole telecast by ITN. He has been worked as a resource person for drama and theatre at the University of Moratuwa and has been done guest lecturers at several universities.

In 2019, he created a music video in London, which is based on the ICC Cricket World Cup final between England and New Zealand. Apart from the acting awards, he won several awards in the fields of stage set design, stage design, composition, costume design, stage management and drama production.

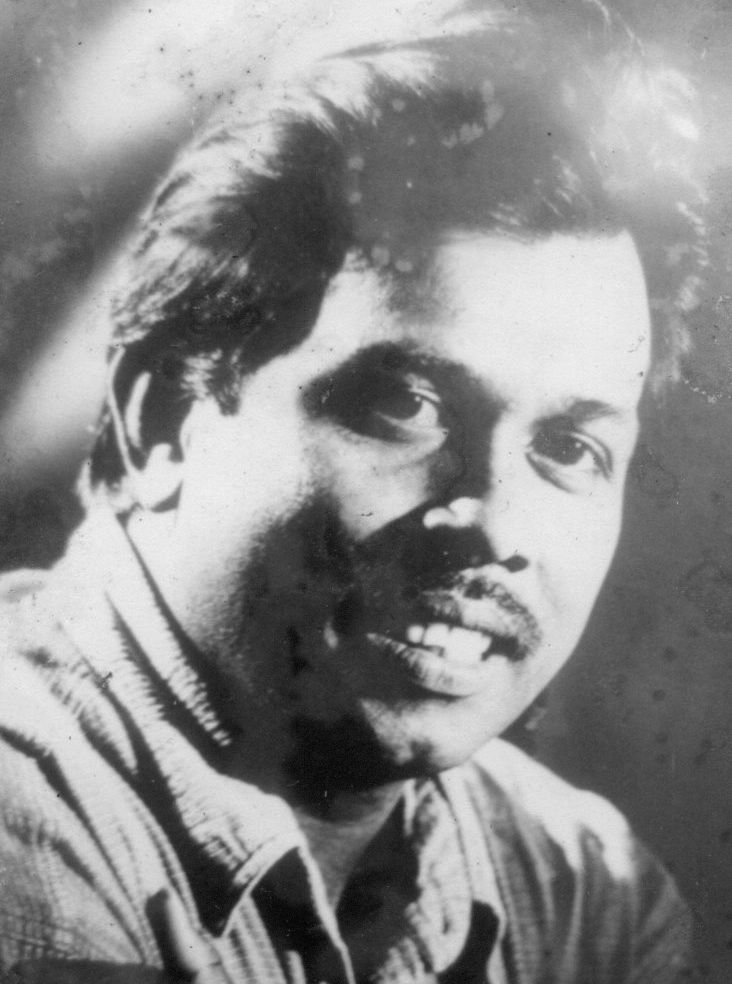
Jayalal Rohana in mid 1980s

=== Selected stage dramas ===
- Gangawak
- Garu Katanayakathumani (2019)
- Gondola (2014)
- Hankithi Dahathuna
- Hitler
- Invisible Wales (1992)
- Juriya
- Leeta (2011)
- Loka (1987)
- Kalu Saha Sudu
- Kelani Palama
- MacBeth
- Math Ekka Natanna
- Padadaya
- Pandukabhaya
- Sakvithi Mola (2003)
- Sapaththukabalak Saha Maranayak
- Senehebara Dolly
- Sikura
- Socrates
- Suba Saha Yasa
- Ukdandu Ginna
- Uththamavi
- Varna
- Veniciye Welenda
- Vikal Samayama
- Yakshagamanaya

=== Publications ===
- Sabe Viduli Vilakkuva (1997)
- Saba Muhune Ves Muhuna '(2000)
- Handa Veduma (2007)
- Ves Muhunada Saba Muhunada '(2016)

=== Selected television serials ===
- Ahasata Thawa Aadarei
- Boralu Paara
- Deweni Gamana
- Gajamuthu
- Ihirunu Kiri
- Isuru Yogaya
- Ekata Gatuma
- Mahathala Hatana
- Mangala Thagga Deveni Gamana
- Minissu
- Nattukkarayo
- Nil Ahasa Oba
- Nirsathwayo
- Rathi Virathi
- Ridi Duvili
- Salmal Landa
- Sandagala Thenna
- Sara

== Filmography ==
Year	Film	Role	Ref.
1995	Ayoma		
1996	Sihina Deshayen		
2010	Tikiri Suwanda	Rajasinghe Chulodara	
2011	Sinhawalokanaya	Yasomitra Sami	
2017	Nimnayaka Hudekalawa	Supermarket cashier	
2018	Nidahase Piya DS	James Peiris	
2019	President Super Star	Reporter	
2020	The Newspaper	News editor	
2020	Miss Jenis	Christopher	
TBD	Akarsha		
