= Popular Awards =

Sri Lankan award ceremony

- Trophy of the award
- Awarded for: Excellence in multiple achievements in several fields
- Country: Sri Lanka
- Presented by: Youth Star Entertainment
- First award: 2023
- Final award: 2025
- Website: https://popularawards.lk

Popular Awards are awards presented annually by the Youth Star Entertainment in Sri Lanka in recognition of individuals’ excellence in the field of cinema, television, social media, music, and media. The Popular Awards ceremony is considered to be one of the most prestigious television program events in Sri Lanka. The awards were first introduced in 2023.

== History ==
The Popular awards ceremony began in 2023 with the leadership of Geethanjana de Costa. Awards were presented recognizing outstanding individuals across various fields to acknowledge and bring forward their value and efforts. Apart from De Costa, Sunil Costa, Nithya Devindi, Malkanthi Jayasinghe and Lasantha Gunawardena served as the executive committee for Popular Awards 2024. The award ceremony has been witnessed 3 times consecutively.

2024 award title

== Awards Given ==
In 2023, the award ceremony commenced with awards under 38 categories, which were increased up to 69 categories with 83 awards in 2024. The awards are categorized into nine sections – Teledrama, Film, Television, Business, Social Media, YouTube, Radio, Music and Special category.

== Award Ceremonies ==
=== Popular Awards 2023 ===
The first British Way Popular Awards ceremony was celebrated on 13 October 2023 at Nelum Pokuna Mahinda Rajapaksa Theatre, where awards for 38 categories were presented. In the film category, award for the most popular film actress was won by Udari Warnakulasooriya and the most popular film actor was won by Ranjan Ramanayake. Sashika Nisansala won the award for the most popular singer under music category. In the teledrama category, award for the most popular teledrama actor was won by Saranga Disasekara and the most popular teledrama actress was won by Tharindi Fernando.

=== Popular Awards 2024 ===
The second Calin Popular Awards ceremony was celebrated in 2024 at the Waters Edge, where 83 awards were given at the ceremony under nine main categories. In the film category, award for the most popular film actress was won by Chulakshi Ranathunga and the most popular film actor was won by Akhila Dhanuddara. In the teledrama category, award for the most popular teledrama actor was won by Sajitha Anthony and the most popular teledrama actress was won by Dinakshie Priyasad. Award for the Most Popular Youth Tele Drama Actress was won by Michelle Dilhara and the Most Popular Youth Tele Drama Actor was won by Randika Gunathilaka.

=== Popular Awards 2025 ===
The third Calin Popular Awards ceremony was celebrated in September 10, 2025, at 5:30 PM at the Monarch Imperial Hotel in Sri Jayewardenepura Kotte, where 106 awards were given at the ceremony under nine main categories. The press conference held on 1 July 2025 at Water’s Edge Hotel. Voting for the awards were concluded on 7 September 2025. In the film category, award for the most popular film actress was won by Udari Warnakulasooriya and the most popular film actor was won by Priyantha Sirikumara. In the teledrama category, award for the most popular teledrama actor was won by Chameera Liyanage and the most popular teledrama actress was won by Shalani Tharaka. Award for the Most Popular Youth Tele Drama Actress was won by Michelle Dilhara and the Most Popular Youth Tele Drama Actor was won by Sajitha Anthony, both for the second consecutive time.

=== Popular Awards 2026 ===
The fourth Calin Popular Awards ceremony was held at a hotel in Sri Jayawardenepura Kotte.

== 2023 British Way Popular Awards ceremony ==
=== Television Category ===
- Most popular television program – Hiru star (Hiru TV)
- Most popular male news anchor – Najith Matharage (ITN)
- Most popular female news anchor – Madhunika Karaputugala (ITN)
- Most popular program presenter – Chamuditha Samarawickrama (Hiru TV)
- Most popular television news channel – Hiru TV
- Most popular television channel – Hiru TV

=== Radio category ===
- Most popular radio program – DJ Ara & Pasbara (Hiru FM)
- Most popular radio news presenter Male – Pubudu Chathuranga (FM Derana)
- Most popular radio news presenter Female – Oshadi Siriwardene (FM Derana)
- Most popular radio news channel – Hiru FM
- Most popular radio channel – Hiru FM

=== Special category ===
- Most popular male dancer – Lalith Parakum
- Most popular female dancer – AK Twins
- Most popular wedding photographer – Dhanuka Kumarasinghe
- Most popular beautician – Chandimal Jayasinghe
- Most popular salon – Tony & Guy
- Most popular teacher – Dinesh Muthugala
- Most popular sportsperson – Wanindu Hasaranga

=== Social Media Category ===
- Most popular TikTok Account – Vanisha Mapitiyage
- Most popular Instagram Account – Piumi Hansamali
- Most popular Facebook Page – I Love You
- Most popular Social media icon – Wasthi Productions

=== YouTube category ===
- Most popular comedy channel – Vini Production
- Most popular cookery channel – Wild Cookbook
- Most popular Travel channel – Travel with Wife
- Most popular Educational channel – DP Education
- Most popular Personal & Vlog Channel – Shanudrie Priyasad
- Most popular Tech channel – Chanux Bro

=== Music category ===
- Most popular music band – Line One with Shane Zing
- Most popular male singer – Chamara Weerasinghe
- Most popular female singer – Sashika Nisansala
- Most popular song – Ale Man (Kanchana Anuradhi)
- Most popular cover song – Piyamanne (Harsha Maduranga & Abishek Geethadewa)

=== Teledrama category ===
- Most popular teledrama actor – Saranga Disasekara (Paata Kurullo)
- Most Popular teledrama actress – Tharindi Fernando
- Most popular teledrama – Sangeethe (TV Derana)
- Most popular teledrama song – "Komaliya" (Jaanu)

=== Film category ===
- Most popular film actor – Ranjan Ramanayake
- Most popular film actress – Udari Warnakulasooriya
- Most popular film – Kadira Divyaraja
- Most popular film song – "Bombe Motai" (Gajaman)

== 2024 Calin Popular Awards ceremony ==
=== Television Category ===
- Most popular political program – Salakuna (Hiru TV)
- Most popular television Program – Hiru star (Hiru TV)
- Most popular male News Anchor – Saranga Pathirana (Hiru TV)
- Most popular female news anchor – Ishara Samarasinghe (Swarnavahini)
- Most popular male Program Presenter – Peshala Manoj (TV Derana)
- Most popular female program Presenter – Thilini Poornima (ITN)
- Most popular television news channel – Hiru TV
- Most popular upcoming television channel – Supreme TV
- Most popular television channel – Hiru TV

=== Radio category ===
- Most popular radio program – DJ Ara & Pasbara (Hiru FM)
- Most popular radio drama – Kana Madiri Rathriya (Shree FM)
- Most popular radio news presenter Male – Asanka Shrimal. (Shree FM)
- Most popular radio news presenter Female – Nimasha Amararathna (Hiru FM)
- Most popular male radio program presenter – Gayan Gamlath (Siyatha FM)
- Most popular female radio program presenter – Bhashini Samarasinghe (Shree FM)
- Most popular radio news channel – Hiru FM
- Most popular upcoming radio channel – Shaa FM
- Most popular radio channel – Hiru FM

=== Special category ===
- Most popular male dancer – Basker Prakash
- Most popular female dancer – Damithri Subasingha
- Most popular dancing group – Chandana Wickramasingha & the dancers guild Sri Lanka
- Most popular male event compere – Moksha Prasad
- Most popular female event compere – Ashinsani Weerasinghe
- Most popular newspaper – Lankadeepa
- Most popular Youth Teacher – Tissa Jananayaka
- Most popular male teacher – Akila Vimanga
- Most popular female teacher – Hayeshika Fernando

=== Social Media Category ===
- Most popular TikTok Account – Sachini Chathurangi
- Most popular Instagram Account – Piumi Hansamali
- Most popular Facebook Profile – Piumi Hansamali
- Most popular Facebook page – Suraveera Kello
- Most popular Social media icon – Wild Cook Book

=== YouTube category ===
- Most popular upcoming comedy channel – Siril Ayya
- Most popular comedy channel – Vini Production
- Most popular cookery channel – The Rustic Kitchen
- Most popular travel channel – Travel with Wife
- Most popular educational channel – WOW English academy
- Most popular Personal & Vlog Channel – Point of Pavithra
- Most popular YouTube Program presenter – Chamuditha Samarawickrama
- Most popular YouTube channel – Shanudrie

=== Business category ===
- Most popular event photography – Naveen Gunasekara
- Most popular wedding photographer – Dhanuka Kumarasinghe Dark Room
- Most popular upcoming beautician – Udara Malshan
- Most popular upcoming saloon – Hiruni & Saree salon
- Most popular male beautician – Chandimal Jayasinghe
- Most popular female beautician – Dilukshi Narangoda
- Most Popular saloon – Salon PR
- Most popular male entrepreneur – Viraj Wichramanaya
- Most popular female entrepreneur – Dr. Pramila Ranasingha

=== Music category ===
- Most popular Youth male singer – Shan Putha
- Most popular Youth female singer – Hana Shafa
- Most popular music band – Avatar
- Most popular male singer – Chamara Weerasinghe
- Most popular female singer – Sashika Nisansala
- Most popular Youth song – Seethala Haduwakin (Yasith Kelambiarachchi)
- Most popular Youth music video – Arabi Kumari (Sadun Perera)
- Most popular song – Nopathuwa Mohothaka (Milinda Sadaruwan)
- Most popular music video – Labandi Komaliya (Bathiya and Santhush)

=== Teledrama category ===
- Most popular upcoming teledrama actor – Sanjaya Muramudali
- Most popular upcoming telerrama actress – Dasuni Senethma and Piyumali Edirisinghe
- Most Popular teledrama actor of the youth – Randika Gunathilaka
- Most Popular teledrama actress of the youth – Michelle Dilhara
- Most popular teledrama actor – Sajitha Anthony (Paata Kurullo)
- Most Popular teledrama actress – Dinakshie Priyasad (Take Care)
- Most Popular weekend teledrama – Take Care
- Most popular teledrama – Paata Kurullo (Hiru TV)
- Most popular television channel – ITN

=== Film category ===
- Most popular youth film actor – Hemal Ranasinghe
- Most popular youth film actress – Dinakshie Priyasad
- Most popular film actor – Akhila Dhanuddara
- Most popular film actress – Chulakshi Ranathunga
- Most popular youth film – Visal Adare
- Most popular film – Sinhabahu

== 2025 Calin Popular Awards ceremony ==
=== Television Category ===
- Most popular male news Anchor – Vindana Prasad (Hiru TV)
- Most popular female news anchor – Sarasi Pieris
- Most popular male Program Presenter – Saranga Disasekara (Hiru Star)
- Most popular female program Presenter – Yugani Gunathilake
- Most popular television Program couple – Heshan Mallawa and Julia Sonali (Sirasa TV)
- Most popular political program – Satana (Sirasa TV)
- Most popular reality program – Hiru Star (Hiru TV)
- Most popular chat program – Copy Chat (Hiru TV)
- Most popular social service program – Gammadda (Sirasa TV)
- Most popular television news channel – Hiru TV
- Most popular innovative television channel – TV Supreme
- Most popular television channel among the youth – Hiru TV
- Most popular television channel – Hiru TV
- Most popular television icon – Hiru TV

=== Radio category ===
- Most popular radio program – DJ Ara & Pasbara (Hiru FM)
- Most popular radio male program presenter – Lakmal Siriwardena
- Most popular radio female program presenter – Binoli Jayamali
- Most popular radio news channel – Hiru FM
- Most popular radio couple – Kitchcha and Avish
- Most popular emerging radio channel – Supreme Radio
- Most popular entertaining radio channel – Shaa FM
- Most popular radio channel among the youth – Y FM
- Most popular radio channel – Hiru FM

=== Special category ===
- Most popular male dancer – Ramod Malaka
- Most popular female dancer – Ama Kankanmge
- Most popular dancing group – TM Dancing Academy
- Most popular photographer – Danuka
- Most popular stage drama – Saduda Watenne Sikuradata by Chalaka Ranasooriya
- Most popular creative campaign – CBL Munchee Savory campaign
- Most popular restaurant brand – Mr Kottu
- Most popular biscuit band – CBL Munchee
- Most popular real estate company – Home Lands

=== Social Media Category ===
- Most popular TikTok Account – Iro
- Most popular Instagram Account – Piumi Hansamali
- Most popular Facebook Profile – I Love You
- Most popular Facebook page – Love City
- Most popular Social media icon – Shanudrie Priyasad
- Most popular overseas digital brand – WESL

=== YouTube category ===
- Most popular Travel Youtube channel – Travel with Wife
- Most popular Cooking Youtube channel – Anoma's Kitchen
- Most popular Personal and Vlog Youtube channel – Truth with Chamuditha
- Most popular Educational Youtube channel – Hayeshika Fernando
- Most popular Emerging entertaining Youtube channel – Padiri Production
- Most popular Entertaining Youtube channel among the youth – Vini Production
- Most popular Entertaining Youtube channel – Janai Priyai
- Most popular Youtube channel – Wild Cookbook

=== Business category ===
- Most popular male beautician – Chandimal Jayasinghe
- Most popular female beautician – Sevini Nanayakkara
- Most Popular saloon – Dee's Hair and Beauty

=== Music category ===
- Most popular child singer – Dinuli Damsandi
- Most popular emerging male singer – Dilu Beats
- Most popular emerging female singer – Siyumini Opayangi
- Most popular song among the youth – Dumare (Robee Jay)
- Most popular song – Himi Nathi Adareka (Raveen Tharuka)
- Most popular Youth music video among the youth – Ragana (Kanchana Anuradhi)
- Most popular Youth music video – Mala Panala (Jo Perera)
- Most popular Youth male singer – Manej Sanjaya
- Most popular Youth female singer – Nuwandhika Senarathne
- Most popular female singer – Hana Shafa
- Most popular male singer – Supun Perera
- Most popular rap artist – Rapzilla
- Most popular singing duo among the youth – Sarith Surith
- Most popular singing duo – Bathiya and Santhush
- Most popular music band – Avatar
- Most popular female excellence singer – Nirosha Virajini
- Most popular male excellence singer – Chamara Ranawaka

=== Teledrama category ===
- Most popular upcoming teledrama actor – Chathuranga Kodithuwakku and Devinda Wickramasinghe
- Most popular upcoming teledrama actress – Kaweerna Wanniarachchi and Prashaa Michael
- Most popular weekend teledrama – Veeduru Thira (ITN)
- Most popular teledrama Actress of the Youth – Michelle Dilhara (Ron Soya)
- Most popular teledrama Actor of the Youth – Sajitha Anthony (Paata Kurullo)
- Most popular teledrama actress – Shalani Tharaka
- Most popular teledrama actor – Chameera Liyanage
- Most popular teledrama couple – Sachin Liyanage and Nethmi Roshel
- Most popular excellence teledrama actress – Danushka Jayaratne (Mayawi)
- Most popular excellence teledrama actor – Wasantha Moragoda (Sasankara)
- Most popular teledrama of the youth – Paata Kurullo (Hiru TV)
- Most popular teledrama – Mayawi (Sirasa TV
- Most popular excellence teledrama – Iragini Maddahana
- Most popular television channel – Hiru TV

=== Film category ===
- Most popular youth film actor – Ranjan Ramanayake
- Most popular youth film actress – Dinakshie Priyasad
- Most popular emerging film actor – Magha Sooriyaarachchi
- Most popular emerging film actress – Nihari Perera
- Most popular film actor – Priyantha Sirikumara
- Most popular film actress – Udari Warnakulasooriya
- Most popular youth film – Clarence: Rhythm of the Guitar
- Most popular film – Nelum Kuluna
- Most popular excellence film – Rani

=== Special Appreciation category ===
- Leaf House
- Janaka Dhanuddara
- Anudi Gunasekara (beauty pageant winner)
- Gamini Jeewarathna (singer)
- Hasantha Hettiarachchi (for the television program Atapattama
- Lakshmi Kumari
- Kalum Srimal (journalist)
- Sajith V. Chathuranga (musician)
- Supreme Jana Suwa Yathra (TV Supreme)
- Anoma Priyadarshani

=== Merit category ===
- Sudheeksha Samadhi
- Ameliya Wijesooriya
- Hashini Chandanayake

=== Tribute Awards ===
Outstanding careers in singing for decades in Sinhala song and cinema,

- Samitha Mudunkotuwa
- Senanayake Weraliyadde
- Rookantha Gunathilake

Lifetime Achievement Award for the Outstanding career in Sinhala Cinema,

- Ravindra Randeniya

== 2026 Calin Popular Awards ceremony ==
=== Television Category ===
- Most popular male news Anchor – Anurudda Rathnayake (Hiru TV)
- Most popular female news anchor – Omaya Kovilagodage (Sirasa TV)
- Most popular Program Presenter – Narmadha Abeywardena (Copy Chat)
- Most popular television Program couple – Asanga Satharasinghe and Dasuni Navodya (ITN)
- Most popular chat program – Copy Chat (Hiru TV)
- Most popular quiz program – Lakshapathi (Sirasa TV)
- Most popular program – Hiru Star (Hiru TV)
- Most popular television news channel – Hiru TV
- Most popular television channel among the youth – Sirasa TV
- Most popular television channel – Hiru TV
- Most popular television icon – Hiru TV
- Special Tribute awards – Athula Ransirilal, Sarath Kumara, Priyantha Wijesinghe

=== Radio category ===
- Most popular radio program – DJ Ara & Pasbara (Hiru FM)
- Most popular radio male program presenter – Chathura Wijerathna
- Most popular radio female program presenter – Aisha Karunathilaka
- Most popular radio couple – Chamith Widanagamage & Charu Samadhi (Lakhanda)
- Most popular entertaining radio channel – Y FM
- Most popular radio channel among the youth – Sun FM
- Most popular radio channel – Hiru FM
- Most innovative radio male program presenter – Dimantha de Silva (Hiru FM)
- Most innovative radio female program presenter – Aadhi Deshapriya (Y FM)

=== Digital Category ===
- Most Innovative Facebook page – BRO
- Most Entertaining Facebook page – LOVE CITY
- Youth Choice Facebook page – SUNDARI
- Most Engaging Facebook page – I LOVE YOU
- Most Popular Facebook page – 1000 TALK
- Most popular Instagram personality – Piumi Hansamali
- Most Innovative TikTok page – Manee Girl
- Most Popular TikTok page – Nipun Rajapaksa
- Most Popular TikTok personality – Lochana Jayakody
- Most Popular Digital Innovator – Nimnastiktok
- Most Popular Digital Content Creator – Iro
- Most Popular Family Content Creator – 3 Posha Family
- Most Outstanding Digital Presenter – Chamuditha Samarawickrama
- Most Entertaining YouTube Channel – Lakai Sikai
- Most Popular Music YouTube Channel – Swara Entertainment
- Most Popular Personal & Vlog YouTube Channel – Sangeeth Dini Vlogs

=== Business category ===
- Most Innovative Beauty Salon – Salon Chamya
- Most Popular Beauty Icon – Chandimal Jayasinghe
- Most Popular Salon – Drift Barber
- Most Popular Photography Icon – Dark Room
- Most Popular Sri Lankan Property Service Provider in Europe – Light House
- Most Popular Jewelry Brand – Ashadi Jewelers
- Most Popular Mobile Store – Fono Technologies
- Most Popular Businessman – Charith N Silva
- Most Popular Businesswoman – Piumi Hansamali
- Most Popular Cake Decorating Campus – International Sugar Studio & Campus
- Most Popular Dancer – Oshan Liyanage
- Most Popular Herbal Cosmetics Brand – Yellow Girl PVT Ltd.
- Most Popular Beauty and Bridal Education Centre – International Cosmetology and Bridal Campus
- Most Popular Florist and Wedding Designer – Buddhika Idamgedara
- Most Outstanding Female Educator – Dr. Hayeshika Fernando
- Most Popular Consumer Electronics & Home Appliances Brand – Singer Sri Lanka PLC
- Most Popular Beverage Brand – Coca Cola Beverages Sri Lanka Ltd.
- Special Appreciation Award – Iroshan Sarathchandra, founder of Auto Miraj

=== Music category ===
- Most Popular Singing Duo – Wasthi
- Most Popular Emerging Male Singer – Uvindu Ayshcharya
- Most Popular Emerging Female Singer – Praneesha Thyagaraja
- Most Popular Youth Choice Male Singer – Raveen Tharuka
- Most Popular Youth Choice Female Singer – Kanchana Anuradhi
- Most Popular Male Singer – Raveen Tharuka
- Most Popular Female Singer – Hana Shafa
- Most Popular Live in Concert – Handawaka
- Most Popular Viral TikTok Song – Vaahe by Jo Perera
- Most Popular Rap Song – Kuddah by Smokio
- Most Popular Child Song – Athuru Mithuru by Dinudi Hettiarachchi
- Most Popular Song – 18 Wannam by Yuki Navarathna & Ravi Jay
- Most Popular Music Video – Manamala Katha by Kanchana Anuradhi
- Most Excellence Male Singer – Chandana Liyanarachchi
- Most Excellence Female Singer – Shashika Nisansala
- Most Majestic Singing Voice – Nuwandhika Senarathna
- Tribute Awards – Nalin Perera and Amal Perera

=== Teledrama category ===
- Most Innovative Actor – Isuranga Jayakumara
- Most Innovative Actress – Suhandi Vosadi
- Most Popular Emerging Actor – Induwara Sayagi
- Most Popular Emerging Actress – Kaweerna Wanniarachchi
- Most Popular Supporting Actor – Nino Jayakody
- Most Popular Supporting Actress – Manoja Fernando
- Youth Choice Actor – Sachin Liyanage
- Youth Choice Actress – Dinakshie Priyasad
- Most Popular Actor – Chanuka Prabudda
- Most Popular Actress – Dusheni Siva
- Most Popular On-Screen Couple – Chathuranga Kodithuwakku & Michelle Dilhara
- Most Popular Youth Choice Teledrama – Bolt Anayak
- Most Popular Teledrama – Pata Kurullo
- Most Popular Teledrama Broadcasting Network – Hiru TV
- Most Excellence Actor – Jenet Anthony
- Most Excellence Actress – Umali Thilakaratne
- Most Popular Weekend Teledrama – Dorakada Dewola (Rupavahini)
- Most Outstanding Quality Teledrama Broadcasting Channel – ITN

=== Calin Janakantha Award category ===
- Calin Most Popular Teledrama – Ahankara Adare
- Calin Most Popular Teledrama Actor – Chathuranga Kodithuwakku
- Calin Most Popular Teledrama Actress – Michelle Dilhara
- Calin Most Outstanding Sportsman – Rumesh Tharanga
