= Sun FM (Sri Lanka) =

SUN FM
Colombo, Sri Lanka; Sri Lanka
- Broadcast area: Sri Lanka
- Frequencies: 98.9 MHz Colombo, Kandy, Gongala, Gammaduwa, Kikiliyamana; 98.7 MHz Minuwangala, Hunnasgiriya, Jaffna

Programming
- Language: English
- Format: Contemporary

Ownership
- Owner: Asian Broadcasting Corporation
- Sister stations: Gold FM, Hiru FM, Sooriyan FM, Shaa FM

Links
- Website: www.sunfm.lk

Sun FM (98.9 FM or 98.7 FM) is an English language radio station in Sri Lanka. The station is owned by Asia Broadcasting Corporation. It has broadcast since 1 July 1998. Its current format is pop music.

Sun FM sponsors an annual music festival known as Sunfest.
