= Raigam Tele'es Best Teledrama Singer Award =

The Raigam Tele'es Best Teledrama Singer Award is presented annually in Sri Lanka by the Kingdom of Raigam associated with many commercial brands for the best Sri Lankan male and female singers of the year on the television screen.

The award was first awarded in 2005. Following is a list of the winners of this prestigious title since then.

== Award list in each year ==
Year	Singer (male)	Teledrama	Singer (female)	Teledrama	Ref.
2005					
2005					
2006	T.M. Jayarathne	Doowila Siwanda	Sashika Nisansala	Sedona	
2007	Jagath Wickramasinghe		Samitha Mudunkotuwa		
2008					
2009	Sunil Edirisinghe	Doni	Deepika Priyadarshani	Oba Kawuda	
2010	Samantha Perera		Nirosha Virajini		
2011	Sunil Edirisinghe	Swayanjatha	Nanda Malini	Swayanjatha	
2012	Bachi Susan	Upuli	Indika Upamali	Upuli	
2013	Amarasiri Peiris	Salmal Landa	Danodhya Ayoni Yapa	Salmal Landa	
2014	Nadeeka Guruge	Sihina Aran Enna	Nanda Malini	Girikula	
2015	Asanka Dhananjaya	Daskon	-	-	
2016	Kolitha Bhanu Dissanayake	One Way	Purnima Dhananjani	Meedum Amma	
2017	Saman Lenin	Eliya Kanda	Indika Upamali	See Raja	
2018	Rohana Dharmakeerthi	Thaththa	Buddhini Walivita	Sahodaraya	
2019	Dumal Warnakulasuriya	Sakkarang	Raini Charuka	Click	
2020	Gayan Dissanayake	Giridevi	Lakshana Lakmini	Sulanga Maha Meraka	
2021	Thusith Simson	Mahapolowa	Sachini Nisansala	Mahapolowa	
2022	Bachi susan	Once Upon a Time in Colombo	Sashika Nisansala	Pichchamala suwandai	
2024	Thusith Simson	Viyali	Abhisheka Wimalaweera	Take Care	
