= Sashika Nisansala =

Sri Lankan vocalist

Sashika Nisansala සශිකා නිසංසලා
- Born: Sashika Nisansala Jayasumana; 28 September 1981 (age 45); Deraniyagala, Sri Lanka
- Education: Anula Vidyalaya, Nugegoda; University of Kelaniya; Bachelor of Arts Honours in Performing Arts (University of Kelaniya ) Master of Arts in Drama and Theatre (University of Kelaniya )
- Occupations: Vocalist, Producer
- Spouse: Suranga Mathangaweera
- Children: 2
- Awards: National Awards, People's Awards, Signis Awards, Raigam Awards, Popular Awards, State Television Awards, State Music Awards, Youth awards Sumathi Awards, More info
- Musical career
- Genres: Pop; soul; rhythm and blues; Indian classical music; Folk Music
- Instrument: Vocals
- Background: Solo singer
- Years active: 1999–present
- Label: Independent Artist

Sashika Nisansala Jayasumana (Sinhala: සශිකා නිසංසලා: born 28 September 1981), popularly known as Sashika Nisansala is a Sri Lankan singer and playback singer, one of the best known, most popular and most honoured singers of Sri Lanka. She is often called as the songstress of the heart. She won the SLIM Peoples Awards for the Most Popular Female Singer for a record eleven consecutive years since 2016 and Youth Choice Female Singer for a five consecutive years since 2022.

== Personal life ==
Nisansala was born on 28 September 1981 in Deraniyagala. She completed primary education at Udapola Primary School. Then she attended President's College, Avissavella for the grade-5 scholarship. After passing the grade 5 scholarship, she attended Dharmapala College, Eheliyagoda. She did the GCE Ordinary Level Examination at Dharmapala Vidyalaya and later attended Anula Vidyalaya, Nugegoda for GCE Advanced Level. She had the privilege of learning music under the guidance of the respected Mrs. Deepika Priyadarshani , her music teacher at Anula Vidyalaya .After passing the A/Ls with 3A's, she entered University of Kelaniya in 2002 and completed her degree in Bachelor of Arts Honours in Performing Arts(Four-year Specialization Degree, specializing in Music) in 2006 . Then in 2008, she completed her Masters degree in Master of Arts in Drama and Theatre from University of Kelaniya. In 2008, she married her university sweetheart, whom she met while pursuing her studies at university. The couple have two sons.

== Career ==
Nisansala started music at the age of 5 playing keyboard. Then she joined Childrens' Programs; Shilpa Yathra, Muthuhara and Udara musical programs in television and Handamama, Navum Mihira musical programs in radio(1990 - 1998). She won ( overall winner - all island 1st) the Thurunu Shakthi national singing competition conducted by the National Youth Services Council and Srilanka Rupavahini Cooperation in 1999. Dr.Nanda Malini, Dr.Rohana Weerasinghe and Dr.Victor Rathanayake were the selection committee (judges) of the " Thurunu Shakthi " competition in 1999. After winning, she released her first album. Some of the songs on the album were "Paramitha Nopuramu Api Dedena", "Thol Pethi Vitharak", "Sanda Reta Reta", and "Sanda Eliya Mamai Nam". She was invited to hundreds of both indoor and outdoor musical shows.

Her first music video was released in 2010. During this period she sang singles as well as playback songs. Her first original music video is Chandra Payanna, which was released in 2021 on YouTube. To date, her musical career includes over 70 teledrama theme songs and more than 20 movie soundtracks.With a career spanning nearly three decades, she has won more than 40 prestigious and popular awards.

=== Television shows ===
Year	Title	Channel	Language	Role
2018	Derana 60 plus(Season 1)	TV Derana	Sinhala	Judge – Herself
2019	Derana 60 plus(Season 2)	TV Derana	Sinhala	Judge – Herself
2020	Derana 60 plus(Season 3)	TV Derana	Sinhala	Judge – Herself
2020-21	The Voice Sri Lanka(Season 1)	Sirasa TV	Sinhala	Coach – Herself
2022-23	The Voice Sri Lanka(Season 2)	Sirasa TV	Sinhala	Coach – Herself
2025	Hiru Kids Star(Season 1)	Hiru TV	Sinhala	Judge – Herself

== Songs ==
=== Song Albums ===
==== Paramitha (2000) ====
#	Song Title	Lyrics	Composer
1	Paramitha (පාරමිතා)	Lalith Wasantha	Jayasiri Amarasekara
2	Karadiya Sulange (කරදිය සුළඟේ)	Channa Jayanath	Rohana Weerasinghe
3	Sanda Reta Reta (සඳ රෑට රෑට)	Hemasiri Halpita	Sangeeth Wickramasinghe
4	Panhidata Mithuru Wela (පන්හිඳට මිතුරු වෙලා)	Nayana Ranjani Abeywickrama	H.M. Jayawardena
5	Ran Samanaliyanne (රන් සමනළියන්නේ)	Nihal Gamheva	Nihal Gamheva
6	Sanda Eliya Mamai Nam (සඳ එළිය මමයි නම්)	Lalith Wasantha	Jayasiri Amarasekara
7	Sandata Kiyana Kawiya (සඳට කියන කවිය) (with Chandana Liyanarachchi)	Lalith Wasantha	Jayasiri Amarasekara
8	Senehasa Purahanda (සෙනෙහස පුරහඳ)	Ven. Rambukkana Siddhartha	H.M. Jayawardena
9	Sulang Pipei (සුළං පිපෙයි)	Yamuna Malani Perera	Rohana Weerasinghe
10	Biththi Paththare (බිත්ති පත්තරේ)	Dharmarathna Perera	Sarath De Alwis
11	Seetha Sandun (සීත සඳුන්)	Rathna Shri Wijesinghe	Nawarathna Gamage
12	Siyapathak Pipuna (සියපතක් පිපුණා)	Dharmarathna Perera	Mahinda Bandara
13	Sande Kelum (සඳේ කැලුම්)	Hemasiri Halpita	Sarath De Alwis
14	Thol Pethi Witharak (තොල් පෙති විතරක්)	Rathna Shri Wijesinghe	Rohana Weerasinghe

==== Kiri Weherata ( 2004 ) ====
#	Song Title	Lyrics	Composer
1	Kiri Weherata (කිරි වෙහෙරට)	Channa Jayanath	Jayasiri Amarasekara
2	Mahaththayo (මහත්තයෝ)	Ananda Hewaranige	Thissasiri Perera
3	Sathiye Niwaduwata (සතියේ නිවාඩුවට)	Channa Jayanath	Jayasiri Amarasekara
4	Kawuludu Sada (කවුළුදු සඳ)	Channa Jayanath	Jayasiri Amarasekara
5	Bhawanawaki (භාවනාවකි)	Ashoka Kovilage	Ashoka Kovilage
6	Bathibara Hada (බැතිබර හද)	Lalith Wasantha	Jayasiri Amarasekara
7	Parana Veeda (පරන වීද)	Lalith Wasantha	Jayasiri Amarasekara
8	Sada Kinduriya (සඳ කිඳුරිය)	Rathna Sri Wijesinghe	Jayasiri Amarasekara
9	Seth Kawiyak (සෙත් කවියක්)	Wasantha Kumara Kobawaka	Stanley Peiris
10	Laga Pathaka (ලඟ පාතක)	Sunil R. Gamage	Mahinda Bandara
11	Pini Malakata (පිනි මලකට)	Channa Jayanath	Rohana Weerasinghe
12	Nisansala Sadak (නිසංසල සඳක්)	Shantha Jayalath Thisera	Shantha Jayalath Thisera
13	Sabada Obage (සබඳ ඔබගේ)	Shantha Jayalath Thisera	Shantha Jayalath Thisera
14	Sitha Rayaka (සිත රෑයක)	Shanaka Yamathra	Stanley Peiris
15	Gajaman Nona (ගජමන් නෝනා)	Yamuna Malini Perera	Navaratne Gamage
16	Il Maase (ඉල් මාසේ)	Rathna Sri Wijesinghe	Rohana Weerasinghe

==== Kandulu Bindu ( 2007/ 2008 ) ====
No.	Title	Lyrics	Composer
1	"Hurathal Wedikamata" (හුරතල් වැඩිකමට)	Lalith Wasantha	Jayasiri Amarasekara
2	"Wetena Wetena" (වැටෙන වැටෙන)	Channa Jayanath	Jayasiri Amarasekara
3	"Bo Kolayak" (බෝකොලයක්)	Lalith Wasantha	Jayasiri Amarasekara
4	"Ranhuya Bande" (රන්හුය බැන්දේ)	Channa Jayanath	Jayasiri Amarasekara
5	"Loku Sadhu" (ලොකු සාධූ)	Ananda Hewarangige	Tissasiri Perera
6	"Dura Ahasata" (දුර අහසට)	Yamuna Malani Perera	Rohana Weerasinghe
7	"Battichcha" (බට්ටිච්චා)	Rathna Sri Wijesinghe	Rohana Weerasinghe
8	"Daragannata Hakida" (දරාගන්නට හැකිද)	Suramya Mapitiya	Nandasena Katuwawala
9	"Sanda Babala" (සඳ බබළා)	Samitha Prasanna Arachchige	Rohana Weerasinghe
10	"Sil Pada Mumuna" (සිල් පද මුමුණා)	Upul Shantha Sannasgala	Rohana Weerasinghe
11	"Maha Sayure" (මහ සයුරේ)	Shantha Jayalath Thisera	Shantha Jayalath Thisera
12	"Me Senehasa" (මේ සෙනෙහස)	Kapila M. Gamage	Karunaratne Wijewardena
13	"Sanda Nonidagena" (සඳ නොනිදාගෙන)	Hemasiri Halpita	Sangeeth Wickramasinghe
14	"Sanda Kiranai" (සඳ කිරණයි)	Malani Jayarathna	Navaratne Gamage
15	"Numbe Sitha" (නුඹේ සිත)	Shantha Jayalath Thisera	Shantha Jayalath Thisera
16	"Maya" (මායා)	Bandula Nanayakkarawasam	Mervin Perera

=== Singles ===
No.	Title	Length
1.	""Chandra Payanna"" (Solo Track Version)	03:20
2.	""As Deka Pura"" (Solo Track Version)	04:04
3.	""Mal Sara Hee Sarin"" (Solo Track Version)	02:40
4.	""Husnak Durin"" (Solo Track Version)	03:33
5.	""Oba Ma Hamu Unu Da"" (Solo Track Version)	04:53
6.	""Dangakarra Heene"" (Solo Track Version)	03:38
7.	""Winde Numbai"" (Solo Track Version)	02:34
8.	""Paramitha"" (Solo Track Version)	04:00
9.	""Akasaye"" (Solo Track Version)	03:25
10.	""Sanda Eliya Mami Nam"" (Solo Track Version)	03:48
11.	""Maya"" (Solo Track Version)	03:08
12.	""Gimhana Kale"" (Solo Track Version)	03:43
13.	""Kiri Weherata Mal"" (Solo Track Version)	03:36
14.	""Sanda Reta"" (Solo Track Version)	04:10
15.	""Amathaka Karanna"" (Solo Track Version)	03:40
16.	""Mahaththayo"" (Solo Track Version)	04:25
17.	""Nisansala Sandak"" (Solo Track Version)	02:40
18.	""Ma Ahase Liyu De"" (Solo Track Version)	02:56

=== Collaborations ===
Num.	Song	Collaboration
1	Kawurunda kawuluwa wahuwe	Chamara Weerasinghe, Manuranga Wijesekara, Dilum Thejana
2	Gimhana Sihine	Udaya Shree
3	Suwandai Mal	Samantha Perera /Kasun Kalhara ( Remake )
4	Me Gindara	Miyuru Somarathna
5	Nim Him Sewwa (cover song)	Bathiya and Santhush, Umaria Sinhawansa, Kasun Kalhara
6	Karamba Mal	Bachi Susan
7	Sanda Renu Athi Raka / Heenayakda Me	Prasanga Thisera, Sampath Fernandopulle, Chathurangana de Silva
8	Siyum Than	Mihindu Ariyaratne, Aruna Gunawardena
9	Ape Wela (Joda Akbar - Hiru TV)	Surendra Perera
10	Susumaka Welila (tv derana teledrama ) / Ahipiya wahena	Ruwan Hettiarachchi
11	Aluth siyawasata ( Srilanka rupavahini cooperation )	Saman Lenin, Nilar N. Cassim
12	Ala purannata hith bomai( ITN sooryamangalya - Avurudu Song)	Centigradz
13	Sirilaka piri Awurudu siri( Srilanka rupavahini cooperation - Avurudu Song )	Rohana Baddage ft various artists
14	Sayure jeewitha nawa peralee( Robinson Andaraya - theme song )	Srilanka rupavahini cooperation ( Athula Ransirilal )
15	Payala oba durin randee ( Abheetha diyani - theme song )	Srilanka rupavahini cooperation
16	wandinawanam mage mawubima	T.M.Jayarathne, Dhanith Shri
17	Irabatu tharuwe Eliyen / male bamaru rangana	Amarasiri Peiris
18	Rala umathu wela ( Sedona Teledrama )	Dr. Premasiri Kemadasa, Sumithra Rahubadhdha
19	maddahanaka aswadduma was vaduna ( Maddahana Teledrama theme song )	Dumal Warnakulasooriya, Sumith Rathanayake
20	Akasaye dura gimahana iwure	Kasun Kalhara, Wasantha Kumara Kobawaka
21	Hithak papuwak nadda	Senanga Dissanayake, Yashoda Adikari
22	Chandra Payanna	Dinesh Gamage, Manuranga Wijesekara, Amith guru, Gayan Randy, Palinda uduwelaarachchi
23	Wenadata Nokiyana ( Sarigma - movie song)	Harshana Dissanayake
24	Ahasa Kaluwarai	Dr.Saman Panapitiya
25	Gange giya kirikalaya	Darshana Ruwan Dissanayake
26	Porana Panduwas Nuwara	Dr. Nanda Malini
27	Sasare Mathake	Amal Perera
28	Nopenena se ( kiya denna adare tharam teledrama song )	Sirasa TV
29	Bol thambiliya mal	Chandana Liyanaarachchi
30	dura yanna sithuwata / Dangakara heene	Udara Samaraweera
31	Oba asipiya nohela baluwa / mathak nokalata	Priyantha Nawalage, Shehan galahitiyawa
32	Gimhana kale	Romesh Sugathapala
33	Amathaka karanna	Raj Thillaiyampalam
34	Apa hamuwuna thana	Radeesh Vandabona, Sajith V.Chathuranga
35	As deka pura	Thilina Ruhunage
36	Rawana Ma obe Seetha	Aradana Ekananayake
37	Wada aree wadata yathi gahanu	Darshana Wickramathunga
38	A maga waradee	Navarathna Gamage, K.B. Herath, U.B.Rathnayake
39	His Ahasata yami Piyamba	Billy Fernando
40	Nalavili Geeyak / Puthe numba	Bandara Eheliyagoda, Amali Eheliyagoda
41	Sandun Suwada pathurannam	Gaya ramya alwis, Ranjith premaweera
42	minisa obamaya	Gayan Ganakadara
43	Malaki duwe numba ( movie song )	Kularathna Ariyawansa, Dr.Rohana Weerasinghe
44	Husmak Durin	Dilan Gamage
45	Gagana Sarannata ( Kirilliyo drama - Srilanka rupavahini cooperation )	Uma Aseni , Enisha Dulshani
46	Malak vee Ma	Ven. Rambukkana Siddhartha Thero
47	Sanda kiduru kuledi	Wasantha Dukgannarala
48	Sigiri bithu sithuwam	Dr.Premasiri Kemadasa
49	Me ahasa pura tharuka aran	Prins Udaya Priyantha
50	Yadinni	Sunil R.gamage Dr. Rohana Weerasinghe
51	Ridennata na	Darshana Wickramathunga
52	Numba Malaki	Ravi Siriwardhana
53	Dase Ma priyawi( Jaffnadaraya teledrama - Swarnawahini)	Arjuna Ranadewa, Ranga Premarathne, navarathne gamage
54	Monara Kukulanta Rakusu Debarunta ( Badda Addara Teledrama - Srilanka rupavahini Cooperation	Piyumi bhagya, Sanjana sewmini, Pasindu Hathurusinghe, Pubudu Sangeeth ft various artists
55	Gala halenaa ( Underpants Thief - Movie theme song	Dr. Somarathna Dissanayake, Renuka Balasooriya
56	Samanala Wewa langa	Kapila Aparekka ft Dishan Nanayakkara
57	Sihini teledrama theme song ( ITN )	Mahesh Rathsara Maddumaarachchi, Shantha Zoysa
58	Oba mage hadawathe ( Sihina nelum Mal movie )	Shameera Naotunna, Milinda Thennakone
59	Kelani Matha ( University of Kelaniya - 60 th anniversary theme song	Prof.Patrick Rathnayake, Milinda Thennakone, Sajitha Anuththara Anthony, Mahesha Sandamali, Thumidu Dodanthenna, Asha Edirisinghe, Madhavee Wathsala Anthony
60	Nibandawa ikilana tharuwel wage kumatada walapee...heta hinahewi	Samantha Perera, Nilar N.Cassim, Anura Ranasinghe
61	Kelani Sarasavi Prema Geethaya	Shantha Kumara Vithana( Shakuvi ), Rohana Dharmakeerthi
62	Siththaravee	Dushan Jayathilaka, Denzil Nugegoda
63	Asipiya Yata	Rev. Fr. Shiran Chamaka Perera, Prasanga Thisera, Viduranga Vilochana Perea ( CRICK VIDU )
64	Meedum daharin sanda ras dooren ( Sewanali - Teledrama theme song )	Raween Kanishka
65	Kusa piree Nathi Walanda Abiyasa..Amma... ( Thurunu Shakthi Grand Finale(1999) - 1st Original Song )	Darshana Bodhikotuwa, Darshi Kalubowila
66	Aye dawasaka Hamuwenna mata Navidin nam Inna Baha	Neluka .S.Fernando, Nalaka Anjana Kumara
67	Oba gena giya mage sihinaya	Suramya Mapitiya, Darshana Ruwan Dissanayake ( DRD )
68	Me Kandlu Bidu Aharee	Shamila Hussain
69	Sayure pipee ( Sujatha Diyani - TV series )	Srilanka Rupavahini Cooperation
70	Belihul Oye	Prof. Nandasiri Keembiyahetti
71	Thumula Angalum Kamhale	Dayan Witharana
72	Sunila Neth pokune	Sugath Somaweera
73	Patisothagamee	Saman Lenin
74	Jeewithe Eka	Eng. Prasanthi Ranasinghe
75	Sanda Ahasata	Dr.Asha Abeysekara
76	Sadaa pawathina thura ira handa	General Kamal Gunarathna, Chamith Cooray, Bathiya and Santhush, Umaria Sinhawansa, Saman Lenin
77	Ethera Soya	Sadara Bandara
78	Me Gammanen	EBC ( Shree FM - 2002/2003 )
79	Dedunna Se	Nisal Gamage, Amith Guru, Ruwan Hettiarachchi
80	Ma ahase liyu de	Kasun Kalhara, Yamuna Malini perera

== Awards ==
=== National Awards ===
Year	Nominee / work	Award	Result
1999	Thurunu Shakthi National Awards	First place	Won
2000	Yawwana Sammana National Awards(State Youth Awards)	First place	Won

=== Raigam Tele'es ===
Year	Nominee / work	Award	Result
2006	Sedona (Swarnawahini)	Best Female Vocalist	Won
2008	Sandagalathenna ( Srilanka Rupavahini Cooperation )	Best Female Vocalist	Nominated
2020	Pulingu ( ITN )	Best Female Vocalist	Nominated
2022	pichchamala suwandai (ITN)	Best Female Vocalist	Won

=== Sumathi Awards ===
Year	Nominee / work	Award	Result
2006	Sedona(Swarnawahini)	Best Teledrama Singer Award	Nominated
2008	Sandagala Thanna(Srilanka rupavahini cooperation )	Best Female Vocalist	Won
2012	Ranthaliya walawwa ( Swarnawahini )	Best Teledrama Singer Award	Nominated
2013	Monara Thanna(Swarnawahini)	Best Female Vocalist	Won
2021	Pulingu(ITN)	Best Teledrama Singer Award	Won

=== State Television Awards ===
Year	Nominee / work	Award	Result
2008	Sandagala Thanna	Best Teledrama Singer	Won
2009	Nil ahasa oba	Best Female Vocalist	Won
2012	Ranthaliya walawwa	Best Female Vocalist	Won
2013	Monara Thanna	Best Female Vocalist	Won
2020	Pulingu	Best Teledrama Singer	Nominated
2022	Pichcha mala suwandai	Best Teledrama Singer	Nominated

=== SIGNIS Awards ===
Year	Nominee / work	Award	Result
2012	Sandagiri Pawwa	Best Female Vocalist ( Teledrama )	Won
2021	Underpants Thief	Best Female Film Playback Singer of the Year	Won

=== State Music Awards ===
Year	Nominee / work	Award	Result
2014	"Me tharam digu ai rathriya"	Best Female Vocalist	Won
2016	"Sunila Neth Pokune"	Best Female Vocalist	Won
2025	"Chandra Payanna"	Best Music Video	Won

=== Derana Music Video awards ===
Year	Nominee / work	Award	Result
2015	Oba As Piya Nohela Baluwa	Most Popular Song of the Year(Gold winner)	Won

=== SLIM Peoples Awards ===
Year	Nominee / work	Award	Result
2016	People's vote	Most Popular Songstress	Won
2017	People's vote	Most Popular Songstress	Won
2018	People's vote	Most Popular Songstress	Won
2019	People's vote	Most Popular Songstress	Won
2020	People's vote	Most Popular Songstress	Won
2021	People's vote	Most Popular Songstress	Won
2022	People's vote	Most Popular Songstress	Won
2023	People's vote	Most Popular Songstress	Won
2024	People's vote	Most Popular Songstress	Won
2025	People's vote	Most Popular Songstress	Won
2026	People's vote	Most Popular Songstress	Won

Year	Nominee / work	Award	Result
2022	People's vote	Youth Choice Female Singer of the Year	Won
2023	People's vote	Youth Choice Female Singer of the Year	Won
2024	People's vote	Youth Choice Female Singer of the Year	Won
2025	People's vote	Youth Choice Female Singer of the Year	Won
2026	People's vote	Youth Choice Female Singer of the Year	Won

=== Bunka Awards ===
Year	Nominee / work	Award	Result
2017	Achievement in Music	Special Recognition Award	Won

=== Popular Awards ===
Year	Nominee / work	Award	Result
2023	People's vote	Most popular Female Singer of the Year	Won
2024	People's vote	Most popular Youth choice Female Singer of the Year	Nominated
2024	People's vote	Most popular Female Singer of the Year	Won
2025	People's vote	Most popular Excellence Female Singer of the Year	Nominated
2026	People's vote	Most popular Excellence Female Singer of the Year	Won

=== Diamond Excelence Awards ===
Year	Nominee / work	Award	Result
2026	People's vote	Most Popular Female Vocalist	Won

=== Platinum Excelence Awards ===
Year	Nominee / work	Award	Result
2026	Achievement in Music	Grand Platinum Excelence in Vocal Artistry and Musical Influence	Won

=== Global Synergy Awards ===
Year	Nominee / work	Award	Result
2026	People's Choice	Most Popular Singing Star	Won

=== Golden Business Excelence Awards ===
Year	Nominee / work	Award	Result
2025	Achievement in Music	Excelence in Vocal Performance and Contemporary Music Artistry of the Year	Won

=== Asia Popular Grand Awards ===
Year	Nominee / work	Award	Result
2026	Achievement in Music	Best Singer Of The Year	Won

=== Derana Calin Aya Pranama (ඇය ප්‍රණාම) ===
Year	Nominee / work	Award	Result
2025	Achievement in Music	Glorious Singing Star	Won

=== ඇයයි දිරි අභිමන් ===
Year	Nominee / work	Award	Result
2026	Appreciation Of Enchanting Voices	The Golden Melody Award	Won
