= Chandimal =

Chandimal is both a given name and a surname. Notable people with the name include:

- Chandimal Jayasinghe (born 1983), Sri Lankan cosmetologist
- Dinesh Chandimal (born 1989), Sri Lankan cricketer
