= Gayan Gunawardana =

Sri Lankan singer and actor

Gayan Gunawardana ගයාන් ගුණවර්ධන
- Born: Gayan Gunawardana; 14 August 1992 (age 34); Colombo, Sri Lanka
- Citizenship: Sri Lankan
- Education: Royal Institute International School
- Occupations: Singer, actor, television presenter
- Years active: 2008–present
- Known for: Music and television acting
- Spouse: Poojani Bhagya
- Father: Nuwan Gunawardana

Gayan Gunawardana (born 14 August 1992) is a Sri Lankan singer, actor, and television presenter. He is the son of the veteran singer Nuwan Gunawardana. Gunawardana has performed in several television teledramas, including Paara Dige, Husmak Tharamata, and Ahas Maliga.

== Early life ==
Gayan Gunawardana was born in Colombo and educated at Royal Institute International School. He is the son of Nuwan Gunawardana and Ramona Gunawardana. His father was a well-known figure in the Sri Lankan music industry.

== Personal life ==
Gunawardana is married to Poojani Bhagya, who is also a media personality in Sri Lanka.

== Career ==
He entered the entertainment industry as a vocalist, following his father's career path. He later expanded into acting and hosting television programs on networks such as Swarnavahini, Hiru TV, and TV Derana. He has also been featured in media coverage regarding his musical and acting projects.

== Filmography ==
Year	Teledrama	Role	Channel
2017	Hithuwakkaraya		TV 1
2018	Ahas Maliga		Hiru TV
2019	Husmak Tharamata		Hiru TV
2020	Asanwara Wassak		ITN
2020	Api Ape		Sirasa TV
2021	Paara Dige	Bhanuka	Swarnavahini
2023	Seesarla		TV Derana
2023	Api Eka Raane		TV Derana
2025	Mahaarani	Main Actor	TV Derana

== Concerts ==
- Next Generation Singers (2017) A charitable concert series held at the BMICH featuring veteran musicians and their children.
- Thaththai Puthai (2018, 2022) A collaborative concert series with his father, veteran singer Nuwan Gunawardana

== Discography ==
=== Solo tracks ===
- Ayemath Enawado Oya
- Oba Wenuwen
- Isabella
- Poojaniye
- Hithe Kathawa
