= Sumathi Best Teledrama Singer Award =

The Sumathi Best Teledrama Singer Award is presented annually in Sri Lanka by the Sumathi Group of Campany associated with many commercial brands for the best Sri Lankan singer of the year in television screen.

The award was first given in 1995. Following is a list of the winners of this prestigious title since then.

Year	Best Singer/s	Teledrama	Ref.
1995	Amarasiri Peiris; Malani Bulathsinhala	Dandubasnamanaya	
1996	Neela Wickramasinghe	Sankranthi Samaya	
1997	Senanayake Weraliyadda	Wana Sarana	
1998	Jagath Wickramasinghe; Uresha Ravihari	Sonduru Wasanthe	
1999	Nanda Malini	Badde Gedara	
2000	S. Kalawathi	Uthurukuru Satana	
2001	Morris Wijesinghe	Dakathi Muwahath	
2002	Nirosha Virajini	Ek Murganganaviyak	
2003	Eishani Ranganath	Asani Wasi	
2004	Kolitha Bhanu Dissanayake	Dolospaya	
2006	Rashmi Sangeetha	Samanala Sihina	
2007	Indika Upamali	Keli Mandala	
2008	Amarasiri Peiris; Sashika Nisansala	Sandagala Thanna	
2009	Amal Perera	Samanalunta Wedi Tiyanna	
2010	D.D Gunasena	Arungal	
2011	Samantha Perera	Abarthu Atha	
2012	Karunarathna Divulgane	Binari	
2013	Amarasiri Peiris; Sashika Nisansala	Monara Thanna	
2014	Amarasiri Peiris; Danodhya Ayoni Yapa	Sal Mal Landa	
2015	Saman Lenin	Kolamba Ahasa	
2016	Indika Upamali	Daskon	
2017	Deepika Priyadarshani	Maada Obama Viya	
2018	Indika Upamali	See Raja	
2019	Thushari Bolukandura	Baddata Sanda	
2020	Dumal Warnakulasuriya	Sakkaran	
2021	Sashika Nisansala; Dumal Warnakulasooriya	Pulingu	
