= Maxwell Silva =

Sri Lankan auxiliary bishop (born 1953)

The Most Reverend Sampathawaduge Maxwell Grenville Silva
- Auxiliary Bishop of Colombo
- Archdiocese: Archdiocese of Colombo
- Province: Western
- Metropolis: Colombo
- See: Titular Bishop of Lesina
- Appointed: November 28, 2011

Orders
- Ordination: July 25, 1981 by Nicholas Marcus Fernando
- Consecration: February 11, 2012 by Malcolm Ranjith

Personal details
- Born: September 27, 1953 (age 72) Moratuwa, Sri Lanka
- Denomination: Roman Catholicism
- Residence: Archbishop's House Colombo
- Parents: Stanley John Silva; Eugene Dias
- Profession: Catholic Priest; Educationist; Rector / Principal
- Education: Roman Catholic School, Willorawatte; St Sebastian's College, Moratuwa; St. Aloysius Minor Seminary, Colombo; National Seminary, Ampitiya
- Motto: CIBAVIT EOS EX ADIPE FRUMENITI (He fed us with the finest wheat)

Sampathawaduge Maxwell Grenville Silva was born on September 27, 1953, in Willorawatte, Moratuwa, Sri Lanka. Presently he is serving as the auxiliary bishop of the Archdiocese of Colombo.

== Birth and childhood ==
He was born into a devoted Roman Catholic family to parents Stanley John Silva and Eugene Victoria Dias. He was the second child of four and the eldest of three brothers. He initially entered the Roman Catholic School in Willorawatte and later attended St. Sebastian College, Moratuwa where he completed his secondary education. As a child he was very much attached to the St. Charles Borommeo parish, Willorawatte and has been a devoted member of the Legion of Mary. Young Maxwell Silva was greatly attached to the 'Brookside' St. Joseph's Convent - Piliyandala where he served as an altar server for many years.

== Steps toward vocational ministry ==
Neither Silva's parents nor his family observed signs of his calling when he was a child. He entered the St Aloysius Minor Seminary on May 3, 1967, after his General Ordinary Level examination. It is said that the Jesuit priests on his mother's side of the family were inspirational in this vocational call and with his parents' blessing he chose the path to priesthood. He excelled in both studies and in sports.

== Ordination and priesthood ==
In 1971 he gained admission to the Harwarden Intermediate Seminary at Haputhale and on February 9, 1974, he entered the National Seminary in Ampitiya with God's guidance for the formation of the priesthood. He was ordained to the priesthood on July 25, 1981, alongside several other deacons at St. Lucia's Cathedral by Nicholas Marcus Fernando, Archbishop Emeritus of Colombo.

Since then he has served in the parishes of Dalugama (1981–1983), Thibbotugoda (1983–1986), Mabola and Kerawelapitiya.

Diocese responsibilities

- Chaplain for youth activities in Kandana
- Chaplain for the Catholic Teachers' Solidarity
- Head of Kotte Deanery

== Serving to educate children ==
In addition to the Degree in Theology from Rome, he completed his Bachelor of Arts degree at the University of Keleniya and subsequently his master's degree in sociology also from the same university amidst parish responsibilities. He also obtained a Diploma in Education and Masters in Arts from the National Institution of Education.

He was the first to join the governmental service as a Catholic priest under the direction of Archbishop Emeritus of Colombo and was posted to St. Joseph's College, Grandpass as his first appointment.

Subsequently, he was assigned as the vice principal of the Ragama Basilica College and his final appointment was as the principal of St. Thomas' College, Kotte which he relinquished upon his elevation as the Auxiliary Bishop of the Archdiocese of Colombo. His teaching career spans over twenty years.

== Appointment ==
Pope Benedict XVI appointed him as one of the Auxiliary Bishops of the Archdiocese of Colombo (alongside Rt. Rev Fidelis Lionel Emmanuel Fernando) on Nov. 28, 2011. He was the fourth priest to enter the episcopacy from Moratuwa following His Lordships Bishop Julian Winston Fernando, Bishop Marius Peiris, Bishop Valence Mendis.

== Episcopal Ordination ==
The Episcopal consecration took place on February 11, 2012, at St.Lucia's Cathedral, Colombo. His Eminence Malcolm Cardinal Ranjith, the Archbishop of Colombo presided as the Principal Consecrator along with Most Rev Archbishop Joseph Spiteri (former Apostolic Nuncio to Sri Lanka) and Rt. Rev Bishop Rayappu Joseph (Bishop Emeritus of Mannar).

He was officially named as the Titular Bishop of Lesina.

=== The Coat of Arms ===
The coat of arms is mainly maroon while the top half is in gold. These are the colors of St. Thomas’ College, Kotte, which he served and loved the most. Three colors were chosen by the veteran missionary Rev. Fr. Zacharias Dabrera, founder of the college.

The lower half in maroon has a saw-tooth edge to remind the bishop of his hometown, Moratuwa, famous for its carpentry. It has a lamp and a threefold flame to symbolize the wisdom of the Holy Trinity, which is the basis of all education to which the bishop has dedicated his life. The lamp has an embossed Holy Spirit with the handle of wheat to symbolize his motto. The maroon signifies strength and vigor and the gold signifies victory.

It has the Na flower to symbolize his devotion to Our Lady of Lanka.

=== Motto ===
CIBAVIT EOS EX ADIPE FRUMENITI — “He fed us with finest wheat”. This is taken from the office readings of Corpus Christi.
