= Shaa FM =

Sri Lankan radio channel

- Shaa FM logo

Colombo, Sri Lanka; Sri Lanka
- Broadcast area: Sri Lanka
- Frequencies: 90.9 MHz; 91.1 MHz

Programming
- Language: Sinhala
- Format: Contemporary

Ownership
- Owner: Asian Broadcasting Corporation
- Sister stations: Gold FM, Sun FM, Sooriyan FM, Hiru FM

History
- First air date: 2002

Links
- Website: www.shaafm.lk

Shaa FM (Sinhala: ෂා එෆ්එම්) is a Sinhala radio channel station in Sri Lanka owned by ABC Radio Networks. It covers the whole island. Shaa means 'wow' in Sinhala, the primary language of Sri Lanka. This radio channel is the first-ever radio channel made for Sri Lankan youth society. Shaa Fm was started in 2002, Sri Lanka.

== Awards ==
Shaa FM was awarded by the prestigious accolade of “Best News Channel” for the year 2010.

== See also ==
- Hiru FM
- Sooriyan FM
- Hiru TV
