= Gold FM (Sri Lanka) =

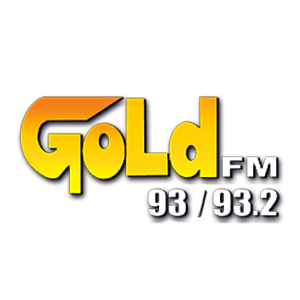
- Colombo; Sri Lanka
- Frequencies: 93.0 MHz (Colombo, Kandy, Gongala, Gammaduwa, Jaffna, Hunnasgiriya); 93.2 MHz (Minuwangala)

Programming
- Language: English

Ownership
- Owner: Asian Broadcasting Corporation
- Sister stations: Gold FM, Hiru FM, Sooriyan FM, Shaa FM

Links
- Website: www.goldfm.lk

Gold FM is one of the retro stations in Sri Lanka. The station was launched in September 1998. Catering to a mature audience, Gold FM plays music from the 1960s, 1970s, 1980s and 1990s. Gold FM broadcasts live from the 35th Floor of the World Trade Center. The station broadcasts on 93.0 & 93.2 FM in Sri Lanka. Gold FM is a part of the ABC Radio Network.
