= St. Sebastian's College, Moratuwa =

St. Sebastian's College

Location
- St. Sebastian's College, Uyana, Moratuwa; Moratuwa; Sri Lanka
- 6.781952°N 79.880637°E

Information
- Type: Semi Government
- Motto: Exspecta Dominum Viriliter Age: Expect the Lord and act manfully-
- Established: 1854; 172 years ago
- Rector: Daya Darshana
- Faculty: 200
- Grades: 1 to 13 local syllabus
- Gender: boys
- Age: 5 to 19
- Colours: Green, white and gold
- Alumni: Bastions/Sebastianites
- Website: www.sebsmoratuwa.lk

St. Sebastian's College (Sinhala: සාන්ත සෙබස්තියන් විදුහල, Tamil: செயிண்ட் செபாஸ்டியன் கல்லூரி) is a Catholic educational institution in Moratuwa, Sri Lanka, established in 1854.

The college enrolls over 4,000 students served by a staff of over 200. The college motto is "Exspecta Dominum Viriliter Age", meaning "Expect the Lord and act manfully" in Latin.

== History ==
St. Sebastian's College opened in 1854 on the porch of St. Sebastian's Church, Moratuwa, with 11 pupils, administrated by parish priest Friar Bondani, with the help of a headmaster and his assistant. In 1863, it received endowments from Chevalier Jusey de Silva Deva Aditya, the founding president of the church. The language of instruction was English. At the request of the Catholics of Moratuwa and the church authorities, the administration of the school was handed over to the De La Salle Brothers on 3 January 1926.

The last headmaster of the school was Lawrence Perera, and the first Brother Director was Irishman Brother Bonaventure Idus. The other two pioneers were a Frenchman, Brother Athanasius Charles, and a Sri Lankan, Brother Glaster Oliver. The Rev. Brothers were provided accommodation at Chevalier Walauwa, the Moratuwa police station. Within a few months secondary classes began on the ground floor of the residence. The main school was situated at Uswatte Circular Road, opposite the engine shed of the Moratuwa Railway Station.

Senior Cambridge and Junior school certificate classes were organised and the school was registered as a secondary school in 1927. In 1930 Evelyn de Mel and Daisy Fernando, the daughters of H. Bastian Fernando, gifted 75,000 Sri Lankan rupees to the school.

Realising the necessity of rapid development, a 4.1 ha (10 acres) block of land at Uyana, Moratuwa was purchased for 30,000 rupees by obtaining a loan of 15,000 rupees from the Archbishop and a donation of 15,000 rupees from Bastian Fernando. The college commenced operations on the near site on 23 December 2004.

With the takeover of denominational schools by the government in 1960, St. Sebastian's College decided to continue as a no-fee private school. This was one of the most difficult periods in the history of the college and Rt. Rev. Bishop Edmund Fernando, then the parish priest of Moratuwa, organised the collection of funds for the maintenance of St. Sebastian's College and Our Lady of Victories convent, Moratuwa. Reverend Brother Modustus, an old boy of the college, was the college director in that turbulent period.

Benildus was the Principal of the college from 1964 to 1973. He managed fundraising projects and set up a welfare office to collect funds directly from parents. In 1974 the college faced another financial crisis and the president's counsel Eardley Perera formed the welfare society. They were responsible for maintaining St. Sebastian's College as a private school. The financial situation improved when in 1979 the government decided to give a grant to the non-fee levying private schools.

In 1989 principal, Brother Granville Perera started a large building project for the school and in two years sixteen primary classrooms were built. In March 1991 Brother Emmanuel Nicholas the Provincial Visitor introduced a Board of Governors as an advisory body to assist the administration of the college. President's counsel Eardley Perera was appointed as the Chairman of the Board of Governors. In June 1991 the Board of Governors established the School Development Society, to be in charge of financial management. With the cooperation of the Rev. Brothers and the Board of Governors the teachers, parents and the alumnae gathered round the college to build a three-storied classroom building and a main hall.

St. Sebastian's College entered a new era in 2003, when Brother Henry Dissanayake, the Provincial Visitor of the De La Salle Brothers, handed over the college management to the Archbishop of Colombo from April 2003. The college is administrated by Fr. Bonnie Fernandupulle, Principal, Fr. Sylvester Ranasinghe, Deputy Principal, and Fr. Pradeep Fonseka, Principal Primary department.

Fernandupulle took over the Rectorship in 2003. The school functions as an 'assisted school" with substantial state funding. The school prepares students for Local Ordinary and Advanced Level examinations in Sinhalese and English.

== College crest ==
- Top Left – Sword, arrows and the centurion's helmet The sword and arrows were used
- Top Right – National Flag and Lion
- Bottom Left – signifies carpentry
- Bottom Right – the Torch of Learning moral and physical education of children

== Houses ==
- Alban: Colour: green, white
- Bonaventure: Colour: gold, white
- De LaSalle: Colour: red, white
- Luke: Colour: blue, white

== Sports ==
=== Cricket ===
The Battle of the Golds is the annual cricket contest Big Match between St. Sebastian's College, Moratuwa and Prince of Wales' College, Moratuwa. In 2011 St. Sebastian's won the Battle of The Gold against Prince of Wales' College after 44 years.

== Notable alumni ==
Name	Notability	Reference
Maxwell Silva	Auxiliary bishop of the Roman Catholic Archdiocese of Colombo, Sri Lanka (2011–Present)	
Valence Mendis	Bishop of Roman Catholic Diocese of Kandy, Sri Lanka (2022–Present) Apostolic Administrator of Roman Catholic Diocese of Chilaw (2022–Present) Bishop of Roman Catholic Diocese of Chilaw, Sri Lanka (2006-2022)	
Duleep Mendis	Test and One-Day International (ODI) cricketer for Sri Lanka national cricket team (1982-1988)	
Susil Fernando	Test and One-Day International (ODI) cricketer for Sri Lanka national cricket team (1983-1984)	
Romesh Kaluwitharana	Test and One-Day International (ODI) cricketer for Sri Lanka national cricket team (1992-2004)	
Prasanna Jayawardene	Test and One-Day International (ODI) cricketer for Sri Lanka national cricket team (2000-2015)	
Dinusha Fernando	Test and One-Day International (ODI) cricketer for Sri Lanka national cricket team (2003)	
Oshada Fernando	Test, One-Day International (ODI) and T20 International (T20I) cricketer for Sri Lanka national cricket team (2019–Present)	
Amila Aponso	Test, One-Day International (ODI) and T20 International (T20I) cricketer for Sri Lanka national cricket team (2016–present)	
Avishka Fernando	Test, One-Day International (ODI) and T20 International (T20I) cricketer for Sri Lanka national cricket team (2016–present)	
Praveen Jayawickrama	Test, One-Day International (ODI) and T20 International (T20I) cricketer for Sri Lanka national cricket team	
Dunith Wellalage	Test, One-Day International (ODI) and T20 International (T20I) cricketer for Sri Lanka national cricket team (2022–present)	
Nuwanidu Fernando	Test, One-Day International (ODI) and T20 International (T20I) cricketer for Sri Lanka national cricket team (2022–present)	
H. Lalith R. J. Nonis	Mayor of Moratuwa (1991–1995)	
Harindra Joseph S. Fernando	Professor of Engineering and Geosciences Wayne and Diana Murdy Endowed Professor of Engineering and Geosciences, Department of Civil & Environmental Engineering & Earth Sciences Concurrent Professor, Department of Aerospace and Mechanical Engineering	
Ajith Nivard Cabraal	12th and 16th Governor of the Central Bank of Sri Lanka (2006-2015/2021-2022) → Senior Advisor to the Prime Minister on Economic Affairs → Alternate Governor of the International Monetary Fund → Chairman of the South East Asian Central Banks Research and Training Centre (SEACEN) Board of Governors → Chairman of the SAARC Central Bank Governors Forum.	
Rajavarothiam Sampanthan	Leader of the Opposition Parliament September 2015 to December 2018. Member of Parliament - Trincomalee (2001–present)	
Abdul Bakeer Markar	Member of Parliament - Beruwala (1960, 1965–1970, 1977–1989), Speaker of the Parliament (1978-1983), Governor of the Southern Province (1988-1993)	
Reginald Cooray	Member of Parliament - Kalutara (1994-2000, 2004, 2010–2015), Governor of the Northern Province (2006–2018)	
Sunil Perera	Musician	
