= E. W. Adikaram =

Sri Lankan activist (1905–1985)

Dr E. W. Adikaram
- Born: Kalutara Koralalage Don Edward Winifred Brito Adikaram; 29 March 1905; Sri Lanka
- Died: 28 December 1985 (aged 80); Nugegoda
- Education: Wesley College, Colombo; Colombo University University of London
- Occupations: Educationalist and social activist

Colvin R. de Silva

Kalutara Koralalage Don Edward Winifred Brito Adikaram (29 March 1905 – 28 December 1985) was an educationalist, writer, social activist and a philosopher in Sri Lanka. In 1931 he obtained an M.A degree from London School of Oriental Studies and in 1933 a PhD on the thesis "Early History of Buddhism in Ceylon" from the University of London. After returning to Sri Lanka he started to teach in Ananda Sastralaya, Kotte and in 1934, he became the principal of the school. He was a prominent non-violent activist in Sri Lanka.

== Early life ==
Adikaram was born on 5 March 1905. Educated at Wesley College, Colombo and succeeded to Colombo University College to study Chemistry. Due to financial problems, he was unable to receive sufficient science education, then he started to follow BA (Bachelor of Arts) Degree after he completed his degree he join to Ananda Shasthralaya Kotte as a teacher . Adikaram won a Scholarship to London University to pursue MA (Master of Arts) and Phd, then he sailed to England. During the days at England he was with some other Ceylonese youths who became leading politicians like Dr.N.M.Perera and Dr. Colvin R. De Silva. He wrote several Sinhala-language science related books, magazines and newspaper entries.

== Institutions founded ==
- Schools: Anula Vidyalaya, Ananda Balika Maha Vidyalaya Kotte 1971 (co-founded with Prof. Mahinda Palihawadana);Ananda Sastralaya, Matugama; Vidyakara Vidyalaya, Maharagama; Nigrodha (now Mahamaya) Vidyalaya, Gangodawila and branches of Ananda Sastralaya at Ruwanwella and Malabe, now known as Madhya Maha Vidyalayas. All of these are state-run schools at present.
- Krishnamurti Centre, Sri Lanka, belongs to the network of study centres in various parts of the world, run by people who are interested in the teachings of Jiddu Krishnamurti.
- Taruna Sitivili Samajaya or Young Thinkers Forum, for the discussion of contemporary social, religious, ethical and ecological issues. At one time it had over 8000 members, mostly youths, drawn from all parts of Sri Lanka. Defunct since Dr. Adikaram's death.
- Sri Lanka Vegetarian Society, Colombo and Matara. The Colombo society was defunct between 1987 and 1997. It was revived and re-vamped in June 1997.

== Principal Publications ==
- Early History of Buddhism in Ceylon, 1946
- Catalogue of Pali and Sinhalese Manuscripts at the Theosophical Society Library, Adyar
- The Pali Reader
- The Dhammapada, an English Translation
- Asoka Lipi (Sinhala translation of the Inscriptions of Asoka)
- Paramanuva (A Sinhala work on The Atom)
- Sitivili
- Dr Adikaram also edited a Sinhala magazine on science named Navina Vidyava, wrote a series of school texts on General Science and numerous newspaper articles on a variety of subjects such as social criticism, physical and environmental sciences etc.
