= Nuwan Gunawardana =

Sri Lankan singer (1949–2022)

Nuwan Gunawardana නුවන් ගුණවර්ධන
- Born: Nuwan Gunawardana; 13 May 1949; Dominion of Ceylon (now Sri Lanka)
- Died: 8 December 2022 (aged 73); Sri Jayawardenepura Kotte, Sri Lanka
- Occupations: Musician, singer, composer
- Years active: 1970–2022
- Spouse: Ramona Gunawardana
- Children: Gayan Gunawardana and Dulari

Nuwan Gunawardana (Sinhala: නුවන් ගුණවර්ධන; Tamil: நுவன் குணவர்தன; 13 May 1949 – 8 December 2022), was a Sri Lankan musician, singer and composer.

== Personal and professional life ==
Nuwan Gunawardana was born in Sri Lanka (then known as Ceylon) on 13 May 1949. He worked as an aircraft mechanical engineer for Air Ceylon and started singing as a hobby during work. Sound engineer Mervyn Baines discovered his talent and directed him to film background vocals. He rose to fame in the 1980s and 1990s by singing popular Hindi songs. He then became a famous concert singer in Sri Lanka. He was married to Ramona Gunawardana, with whom he had two children, Dulari Gunawardana, a businesswoman, and Gayan Gunawardana, an actor and singer and Businessman and also Daughter in law Poojani Bhagya, Model and actress.

== Death ==
Gunawardana died at the age of 73 from a heart attack on 8 December 2022. He was undergoing treatment at the Sri Jayawardenepura General Hospital at the time of his death.
