= Deepika Priyadarshani =

Sri Lankan songstress

- දීපිකා ප්‍රියදර්ශනී
- Born: 13 July 1966 (age 60); Kalubowila, Sri Lanka
- Education: Anula Vidyalaya; Bhatkhande University; University of Kelaniya
- Occupations: songstress, playback singer
- Spouse: Chamika Herath (m. 2018)
- Parents: Sumanadasa Peiris (father); Karuna Peiris (mother)
- Relatives: Priya Gunawardena (aunt)
- Musical career
- Years active: 1986–present

Deepika Priyadarshani Pieris (Sinhala: දීපිකා ප්‍රියදර්ශනී පිරීස්) is a Sri Lankan singer. (born 13 July 1966) One of the most popular female singers in Sri Lanka, she is the only Sri Lankan vocalist to awarded with Gusi Peace Prize.

== Personal life ==
Priyadarshani studied at Anula Vidyalaya, Nugegoda. She has one elder brother, Ajith Peiris and one elder sister, Ajantha Peiris who died when she was 3 years old. Her youngest sister is Shalika Peiris. At early times, her mother had gone to sing for various programs on Sri Lanka Radio. Mother's sister Priya Gunawardena is also a singer.

She obtained Bachelor of Music Education (1st class) Vocal Visharadh, (1st class) from Bhatkhande University, India in 1990 and Master of the Arts in Mass Communication from University of Kelaniya in 2007. Later she obtained Bachelor of Education in 2002.

On 15 August 2018, Deepika married longtime partner Chamika Herath, a banker by his profession. Also as a lyricist, Chamika composed many famous songs such as Maga Denethata Denatha Thea sung by Deepika.

== Career ==
At the school, she studied music under renowned musicians, Manjula Vithnage, B.Victor Perera and Nanda Malini.

Having performed in radio and television programs as a child artist, Deepika later studied music under the musician Dunstan de Silva. In the meantime, she met popular artist Athula Ransirilal at Kalubowila Sri Sambuddha Jayanthi Buddhist school. At the age of 10, Deepika got the opportunity to sing Sanda Mama and Sangeetha Handawa on Sri Lanka Broadcasting Corporation (SLBC).

She started her career in 1985 with the song Aaju Thapara Lahila sung for the television serial Bhagya directed by Vijaya Dharmasri. The song became highly popular among the public and paved the way to singing career. In 1990, Deepika launched her maiden album Sina Podak Wee as an audio cassette. By then she had already secured an appointment as a music teacher in a public school since 1989 including Panadura Gokarana Maha Vidyalaya for five years, Anula Vidyalaya for 10 years and another five years to Visakha Vidyalaya, Colombo.

In 2006, she was lucky to perform in world renowned Sydney Opera House on 3 September and then in Melbourne Concert Hall in Australia and Camden Center in London. In 2009, she was awarded with the most popular female singer awarded by Sirasa FM. In 2020, she launched her fifth album, Sudu Hansinee which is composed of 16 original songs. Some of her most popular songs include; Sina Podak Vee, Pembara Kumarana, Ahasai Oba Mata, Me Thani Yahane, Premayata Nim Him, Oba Heenayak Wage, Nubata Inne Mama Witharada, Boralu Aenena, Pithu Senehe Pidu, Kandulu Hela and Jayasiri Ma Hamuduruwane. She sang many children songs for the cartoons such as Ha Ha Hari Hawa and Behei Kyla Behei Kyla Ba.

Deepika was among 20 laureates of the Philippine Gusi Peace Prize 2012 for performing arts with her song Ma Thotin Ena in the film Saroja. She has bagged several award including presidential award for the best singer. Apart from that she was awarded with the Binka Award by Japan for the illustrious career. In 2015, her solo concert "Kaviya Oba" was held on 24 November at 7.00 pm at the Bandaranaike International Conference Hall.

Apart from singing, Deepika is a board member of National Youth Service Council Sri Lanka and a board member of “Sadaham Sevana” International Buddhist Research Center and consultant of the Ministry of Buddhasasana and Religious affairs. In 2017, she won the Sumathi Award for the Best Singer for the theme song of television serial Maada Obama Viya directed by Sahan Wijesinghe. Before that, she has been nominated for the Sumathi Awards several times.

Currently, she has her own music school "Saundarya Shalikawa" located in Kalubowila which was started in 1993. The concert "Daru Tharu Waruna" was held on June 3 at 6.30 pm at the Bishop's College Auditorium, Colombo which showcased the music abilities of the children of her music school. The first show was held in 2003 was at the Maharagama National Youth Services Council.

So far, Deepika has been performed six musical shows. The first concert was held in Canada. She also worked as a drug prevention consultant and involved in the social work of educating university students and youth about the dangers of drug abuse.
