= Dusheni Silva =

Sri Lankan actress

Dusheni Silva (born 20 June 1995 ; Sinhala: දුෂේනි ඉමේකා මියුරංගි ද සිල්වා), popularly known as Dusheni Miyurangi, is a Sri Lankan film and teledrama actress and former Miss World Sri Lanka. She has won many awards for her teledramas. She was crowned as Miss World Sri Lanka in 2017 nd represented her country at the world pageant.

== Miss World Sri Lanka ==
Silva was the winner of the 2017 Miss World Sri Lanka.

=== Selected television series ===
- Adaraya Gindarak
- Jahuta
- Paara Dige

== Awards ==
- Best Supporting Actress - Derana Film Awards 2025
- Most Popular Actress 2026 - Sumathi Tele Awards
- Most Popular Actress 2026 - Raigam Tele Awards
- Most Popular Actress 2025 - Raigam Tele Awards
- Most Popular Actress 2024 - Sumathi Tele Awards
- Most Popular Actress 2023 - Sumathi Tele Awards
- Most Popular Actress 2024 - Raigam Tele Awards
- Most Popular Actress 2023 - Raigam Tele Awards
- Most Popular Actress 2022 - Raigam Tele Awards
