= Valence Mendis =

The Most Reverend Dr Valence Mendis
- Bishop of Roman Catholic Diocese of Kandy
- Church: St. Anthony’s Cathedral
- Diocese: Roman Catholic Diocese of Kandy
- Installed: 9 October 2021
- Predecessor: Joseph Vianney Fernando
- Previous post: Bishop of Roman Catholic Diocese of Chilaw

Personal details
- Born: Warnakulasurya Wadumestrige Dewasrita Valence Mendis; May 21, 1958 (age 68) Moratuwa
- Education: St. Sebastian's College; Prince of Wales College; University of Peradeniya; Pontifical Urban University

Valence Mendis, formally Warnakulasurya Wadumestrige Dewasrita Valence Mendis, (born 21 May 1958) is a Sri Lankan prelate of the Catholic Church who has been the Bishop of Chilaw since 2006. He has been named bishop of Kandy, where he had spent his first years as a parish priest before joining the staff of the national seminary in Ampitiya and serving as its rector from 2001 to 2005.

== Biography ==
Mendis was born on 21 May 1958 in Koralawella parish in Moratuwa, the eldest of six children. His father was a civil servant. At birth he was given the name "Dewasrita", which means "pleading to God". The family moved to Puttalam in 1976. He studied in Moratuwa at St. Sebastian's College and Prince of Wales College. To prepare for the priesthood he entered St. Paul's Minor Seminary in Marawila in 1975, St. Julian Eymard Intermediate Seminary in Haputale in 1976, and the National Seminary in Ampitiya, a suburb of Kandy, in October 1976. He was ordained a priest of the Diocese of Chilaw on 20 July 1985. He worked for four years as a fidei donum priest in the Diocese of Kandy first at the cathedral parish in Kandy and then east of the city in Padiwatta. He also earned a master's degree in comparative religion at the University of Peradeniya in 1987 with a thesis on "Ritualism in Buddhism" and then lectured there. In October 1989 he joined the staff of the national seminary in Ampitiya. From 1992 to 1994 he studied at the Pontifical Urban University in Rome, earning his doctorate. In October 2000 he became head of the philosophy section of the Kandy seminary and rector of the seminary on 4 February 2001. Beginning in 1995, he served as secretary of the Catholic National Commission for Ecumenism and Dialogue and represented Sri Lanka at international conferences.

He was appointed bishop coadjutor of Chilaw on 17 January 2005 by Pope John Paul II. He received his episcopal consecration on 2 April 2005, shortly before his 47th birthday.

Mendis succeeded Bishop Frank Marcus Fernando as the bishop of Chilaw on 19 October 2006 and was installed there on 28 October.

He has served the Catholic Bishops' Conference of Sri Lanka as head of its Commission for Education, Catechetic and Bible Apostolate and its Commission for Migrants, Health, Tourism and Prisons as well as its secretary general.

On 9 October 2021, Pope Francis named him bishop of Kandy.
