= Harindra Joseph S. Fernando =

University researcher

Harindra Joseph Shermal Fernando is the Wayne and Diana Murdy Family Endowed Professor of Engineering and Geosciences at University of Notre Dame. He holds joint appointments in the Departments of Civil and Environmental Engineering & Earth Sciences (primary) and Aerospace & Mechanical Engineering. He also holds a concurrent appointment with the Department of Applied and Computational Mathematics and Statistics.

He schooled at St. Sebastian's College, Moratuwa, Sri Lanka and studied at the University of Sri Lanka (BSc in Mechanical Engineering, 1979), the Johns Hopkins University (MA 1982 and PhD 1983 in Geophysical Fluid Dynamics) and Caltech (Post-Doctoral research in Environmental Engineering Science, 1983–84). During 1984–2009, he was a faculty member in the Department of Mechanical & Aerospace Engineering at Arizona State University, and was the founding Director of the Center for Environmental Fluid Dynamics (1994–2009). In 2010 he joined University of Notre Dame. He has held visiting professorships at the Solar Energy Research Institute (1987–88), University of Cambridge (1990), the UK Meteorological Office (1991–96), ETH (1996), Tel Aviv University (2002), and the University of Toulon (2007–11).

== Academic work and research ==
Professor Fernando has published over 375 papers in peer-reviewed journals covering a variety of subject areas. He has led several large multi-university research projects dealing with Mountainous Terrain Weather, Air-Sea Interactions in the Northern Indian Ocean, Remote Sensing of Atmospheric Waves and Instabilities, Monsoon Intraseasonal Oscillations and Coastal Fog.

During 2005–07, the New York Times, International Herald Tribune, NBC, PBS, Nature and other international news outlets extensively featured his work on hydrodynamics of beach defenses. In 2008, the Arizona Republic Newspaper included him in “Tempe Five Who Matter”—one of the five residents who have made a notable difference in the life of the city, for his work on Phoenix Urban Heat Island.

He has edited several books. These include Environmental Fluid Dynamics Handbook (Taylor & Francis, 2013), Human Health and National Security Implications of Climate Change (Springer, 2012), and Double Diffusive Convection (AGU, 1994).

He is editor-in-chief of the journal Environmental Fluid Dynamics.

== Honors ==
Professor Fernando is a Fellow of the: American Society of Mechanical Engineers (ASME), American Physical Society (APS), American Meteorological Society (AMS), American Association for the Advancement of Science (AAAAS), American Geophysical Union (AGU) and International Association of Hydro-Environmental Research and Engineering (IAHR).

Among honors Professor Fernando received include Doctor Honoris Causa from the University of Joseph Fourier/University of Grenoble, France (2014) and in 2016 he was awarded Doctor of Laws (LLD) Honoris Causa by the University of Dundee, Scotland. He is also an elected member of the European Academy.
