= Take Care (Sri Lankan TV series) =

2024 Sri Lankan teledrama

- Title card
- ටේක් කෙයා
- Genre: Adult thriller
- Created by: Anushka Rasanjana de Silva
- Developed by: Independent Television Network
- Directed by: Anushka Rasanjana de Silva
- Starring: Saranga Disasekara; Dinakshie Priyasad; Rebecca Dilrukshi
- Voices of: Nanda Malini; Abhisheka Wimalaweera
- Narrated by: Abhisheka Wimalaweera
- Theme music composer: Indrajith Mirihana
- Opening theme: Sapathneeroshayak
- Country of origin: Sri Lanka
- Original language: Sinhala
- No. of seasons: 1
- No. of episodes: 34

Production
- Producer: Saranga Disasekara
- Production locations: Himi Garment, Hiripitiya; Meegoda Ayurvedic Hospital
- Cinematography: Vishwajith Karunaratne; Amayuru Vithanage; Sasanka Udayanga
- Editors: Bhawantha Gamage; Dilan Vijaya Wickramakeerthi
- Running time: 20 to 23 minutes

Original release
- Network: Independent Television Network
- Release: 1 June – 21 September 2024

Take Care (Sinhala: ටේක් කෙයා) is a 2024 Sri Lankan adult thriller teledrama broadcast on Independent Television Network (ITN). The series is written and directed by Anushka Rasanjana de Silva. It is produced by Saranga Disasekara and music direction is by Lasantha Tharaka Jayathilake. The serial stars Saranga Disasekara, Dinakshie Priyasad and Rebecca Dilrukshi in lead roles along with Tharaka Rathnapala, Sudharshani Gelanigama, Bimal Jayakody, Dasun Pathirana, Chandani Seneviratne and Sanath Gunathilake in supporting roles.

== Plot ==
Aseni and Vasala have been married for three years. Aseni is a devoted housewife, maintaining the household with care, while Vasala works as an executive officer at a private garment company. Aseni comes from a deeply religious and traditional family, whereas Vasala's parents live abroad. Their marriage was arranged with the consent of both families through a marriage proposal, but despite three years of marriage, they remain childless. Under pressure from their families, they have made several attempts to have children. Meanwhile, Vasala becomes involved in an affair with Menaka, a simple employee at the garment factory where Vasala is her supervisor. Vasala begins secretly visiting the boarding house where Menaka stays. After some time, Menaka discovers that she is pregnant and informs Vasala that the child is his. However, Vasala refuses to believe her and demands that she get an abortion. He threatens to cut ties with her if she doesn't terminate the pregnancy. Unbeknownst to Vasala, Aseni learns about Menaka and the child. Despite this, Aseni continues her duties as a wife, not revealing any change in behavior toward Vasala. One day, when Vasala returns home from work, he finds Aseni bringing Menaka into their home. Aseni calmly tells Vasala that she is willing to forgive him, but in return, she proposes that they adopt Menaka's child. Vasala, however, opposes the idea. Aseni then offers an ultimatum: if Vasala refuses to agree, they must divorce and reveal the truth to their families. Ultimately, Vasala concedes, allowing Aseni to carry out her plan. Aseni takes Menaka to live in a house far away, which belongs to her cousin, Kasun. Kasun lives alone after the passing of his mother. While living there, Vasala begins to develop deeper feelings for Menaka and urges her to run away with him and the child. However, Menaka remains loyal to Aseni and declines Vasala's advances. As time passes, Aseni begins to sense the growing bond between Vasala and Menaka. This realization causes Aseni to distance herself emotionally from Menaka. Eventually, Menaka confides in Vasala, suggesting they elope and raise the child together. Vasala agrees, asking Menaka to wait a few months before making their move.

== Cast and characters ==
=== Main cast ===
- Saranga Disasekara as Wasala
- Dinakshie Priyasad as Menaka
- Rebecca Dilrukshi as Aseni

=== Supportive cast ===
- Tharaka Rathnapala as Kasun
- Thuresha Senali
- Sudharshani Gelanigama as Nandani
- Ferni Roshini
- Sachini Dilhara as Kasun's girlfriend
- Bimal Jayakody
- Dasun Pathirana as Sanjana
- Chandani Seneviratne as Princila
- Sanath Gunathilake as Vikrama
- Charith Abeysinghe as Viraj
- Minuka Dulmeth as Viraj's son
- Jenet Anthony as Police constable
- Dr. Pramitha Mahanama as Doctor
- Viraj Ranasinghe
- Mihiri Priyangani Yapa
- Kumar Karunanayake
- Shakitha Dabare
- Dhammika Hettige
- Don Upul
- Jayanthi Hemalatha
- Poornima Doranagoda
- Dulanjali Mudunkotuwa
- Wasana Weerapperuma
- Thilini Madhushika

== Production ==
The tele serial is directed by Anushka Rasanjana de Silva, who previously directed two short films: Monalisa and The Guest. Apart from that, he also wrote the screenplay of the web series There is a body and then wrote the web series Eka Wahalak Yata (Under one roof). The serial is produced by lead actor Saranga Disasekara, who previously produced the serial Lansupathiniyo. Cinematography co-handled by Vishwajith Karunaratne, Amayuru Vithanage and Sasanka Udayanga. Dilan Wijaya Wikramakeerthi is the editor and Bhawantha Gamage worked in color combination. Art direction done by Sumiyuru Udantha, Nuwan Tharanga , Dasun Pitawalage. Lighting by Palitha Godage, whereas sound recording co-handled by Kanaga Kumara, Nuwan Chamara, Vishwa de Silva and Gayan Geethapriya. Chamini MUnasinghe, Devindu Karunaratne, Chalindu Theekshana are the assistant directors. Dakshina Gammanpila made costumes, where Randika Tishan also involved in costume and hair styling. Winsitha Wineth Kumarapeli made production management, and Lasantha Tharaka Jayathilake is the music director and sound controller.

Veteran songstress Nanda Malini involved in theme song, "Sapathneeroshayak" along with Abhisheka Wimalaweera, where credits were given to Indrajith Mirihana in music composition. Wimalaweera also involved as the song lyricist and composer.

The working title of the teledrama is "Kema Lasthi". During the shooting, the title was changed to "Take Care". In casting, Dinakshie Priyasad and Rebecca Dilrukshi were first choice selections by the director.

== Popularity ==
The telecasting starts on ITN on every weekend at 9 pm from 1 June 2024. The serial became very popular from the beginning and became YouTube trending. At the Calin Popular Awards, the drama won the Award for the most popular television drama of the weekend.

== Reception ==
"Take Care" received widespread critical acclaim and multiple award nominations across major Sri Lankan award ceremonies, highlighting its storytelling, direction, and performances.

SIGNIS Salutation Awards (2025) The series received 11 nominations, including: - Best Teledrama Production - Best Director - Best Screenplay - Best Actor - Best Actress - Best Supporting Actress - Best Female Singer - Best Creative Editing - Best Music Directing - Best Lyric Writing

The series went on to win 4 major awards: - Best Creative Director – Anushka Rasanjana De Silva - Best Creative Actress – Dinakshie Priyasad - Best Creative Editing – Dilan Wijaya Wikramakeerthi & Bawantha Gamage - Best Lyric Writing – Abhisheka Wimalaweera

Sumathi Awards (2024) "Take Care" garnered 13 nominations, including categories such as: - Best Teledrama Production - Best Director - Best Screenplay - Best Cinematography - Best Actor - Best Actress - Best Supporting Actor - Best Upcoming Actor - Best Editing - Best Music Directing - Best Art Directing - Best Make-up

It won the award for: - Best Upcoming Actor – Kasun Tharaka Rathnapala - Popular Actor - Saranga Disasekara - Popular Actress - Dinakshie Priyasad

Raigam Tele'es Awards (2024) - Best Female Singer – Abhisheka Wimalaweera - Special Jury Award – Rebecca Dilrukshi - Popular Actor - Saranga Disasekara - Popular Actress - Dinakshie Priyasad

== Episodes ==
Episode number	Episode name	Released date
1	"Adaraneeya Yuwalak"	2024-06-01
2	"Dinner Out"	2024-06-02
3	"Happy Birthday"	2024-06-08
4	"Work From Home"	2024-06-09
5	"Take Care"	2024-06-15
6	"Athwereddak"	2024-06-16
7	"Uththara Nathi Prashna"	2024-06-22
8	"Obath mamath aeyath"	2024-06-23
9	"Api Wenuwen"	2024-06-29
10	"Duk Wedana Kandulu"	2024-06-30
11	"Ayithi Nathi Adarayak"	2024-07-06
12	"Chori Chori Chupke Chupke"	2024-07-07
13	"Saadayak"	2024-07-13
14	"Maralayak"	2024-07-14
15	"Asenigen Divorce Eka, Menakagen Daruwa"	2024-07-20
16	"Eheth Pisso... Meheth Pisso..."	2024-07-21
17	"Amma Saha Thundena"	2024-07-27
18	"Eka Moda Wedak"	2024-07-28
19	"We Have Policies"	2024-08-03
20	"Sapathneeroshayak"	2024-08-04
21	"I Really Regret It"	2024-08-10
22	"Duwekda? Puthekda?"	2024-08-11
23	"Naduwak"	2024-08-17
24	"Awa Soya Adare"	2024-08-18
25	"Kawuda? Kageda? Koheda?"	2024-08-24
26	"Ayemath Adaren"	2024-08-25
27	"Api Katha Karamu"	2024-08-31
28	"Le Kiri Kandulu"	2024-09-01
29	"Visa Katu Ha Malpethi"	2024-09-07
30	"Samawak Nathi Waradak"	2024-09-08
31	"Nambuwada? Dikkasadayada? - part I"	2024-09-14
32	"Nambuwada? Dikkasadayada? - part II"	2024-09-15
33	"Parissmin Inna: Take Care - part I"	2024-09-21
34	"Parissmin Inna: Take Care - part II"	2024-09-21
