= Paara Dige =

2021 Sri Lankan comedy/romantic-drama television series

- Paara Dige title card
- Sinhala: පාර දිගේ
- Genre: Thriller Romantic
- Created by: Saddha Mangala Sooriyabandara
- Developed by: Maathra Productions
- Screenplay by: Saddhamangala Sooriyabandara; Buddika Semasinghe
- Directed by: Jayaprakash Shivagurunathan
- Starring: Uddika Premarathna; Dusheni Miurangi; Gayan Gunawardana; Kusal Maduranga; Roshan Pilapitiya; Sachin Chathuranga
- Composer: Induwara sooriyabandara.
- Country of origin: Sri Lanka
- Original language: Sinhala
- No. of seasons: 1
- No. of episodes: 550

Production
- Executive producer: Chamara Samarawickrama
- Editor: Sameera Piyarathna
- Running time: 20 minutes

Original release
- Network: Swarnavahini
- Release: 19 May 2021 – 5 July 2023

Paara Dige (Sinhala: පාර දිගේ) is a 2021 Sri Lankan Thriller/Comedy-drama television series broadcast on Swarnavahini. It is directed by Jayaprakash Sivagurunathan, produced by Chamara Samarawickrama and written by Saddha Mangala Sooriyabandara and Buddika Semasinghe. It aired every weekday from 8:30 pm to 9:00 pm. The series started on 19 May 2021 and ended on 5 July 2023 which spanned for 550 episodes. The series stars Uddika Premarathna, Dusheni Miurangi, Kusal Maduranga, Gayan Gunawardana, Roshan Pilapitiya and Sachin Chathuranga and Induwara Sooriyabandara.

== Cast and characters ==
=== Main cast ===
- Uddika Premarathna as Rehan Aluwihare
- Dusheni Silva as Banti aka Sarani
- Gayan Gunawardana as Bhanuka
- Kusal Maduranga as "Banda" Bandara/Nishantha Bandara/Nilantha Bandara (Note: Kusal Maduranga played a single character with two or more names.)
- Roshan Pilapitiya as Nanayakkara
- Sachin Chathuranga as Abhiya
- Induwara Sooriyabandara as Jude

=== Supporting cast ===
- Viraj Perera as Rexi
- Gayathri Dias as Pushpa
- Kishu Gomes as Adikaree
- Malkanthi Jayasinghe as Rita, Rehan's mother
- Nithya Devindi as Ruvini, Rehan's sister
- Ananda Athukorala as Wilson, Banti's father
- Sena Gunawardena as Ariyasena, Rehan's servant
- Kanchanamala Mahawithana as Nayana, Banti's mother
- Deshani Nehara as Aanya
- Piyumi Srinayaka as Rukshana, Rehan's ex-wife
- Chandima Karunadasa as Darling
- Koralage Saman as Sisira Kumara Ranasinghe aka Sikura
- Nilu Tanasha as Wathsala, Rukshana's friend

=== Minor cast ===
- Volga Kalpani as Tutu
- Ishan S Wanniarachchi as Jerrad
- Swapna Sithara as Manavee
- Sangeeth Satharasinha as Damien
- Thathsarani Piyumika as Nisharaa
- Gayathri Pelpola as Aravindi
- Jeevantha Dassanayake as Martiya
- Ishara Athukorale as Sachini, Rukshana's friend
- Gayathri Dissanayake, Martiya's friend
- Christopher Zappia as himself
- Nishantha Amarasinghe as Nanayakkara's henchman
- Thushan Kothalawala as Nanayakkara's henchman
- Shashith Induwara
- Neshmika Nethsara
- Sanjeewa Maduranga
- Vihari Jayasundera
- Imashi Fonseka
- Mandakini Adithya
- Madhavi Priyadarshani
- Ishara Dilini
- Poornima Sewwandi
- U.R. Weerasinghe
- Pubudu Kanishka

== Awards ==
=== Awards ===
Year	Award	Category	Recipient	Result
2022	Raigam Tele'es	Most Popular Teledrama	Paara Dige	Won
2022	Raigam Tele'es	Most Popular Actor	Kusal Maduranga	Won
2023	Sumathi Awards	Most Popular Teledrama	Paara Dige	Won
2023	Sumathi Awards	Most Popular Actor	Uddika Premarathna	Won
2023	Sumathi Awards	Most Popular Actress	Dusheni Miurangi	Won
2023	Raigam Tele'es	Most Popular Teledrama	Paara Dige	Won
2023	Raigam Tele'es	Most Popular Actor	Uddika Premarathna	Won
2023	Raigam Tele'es	Most Popular Actress	Dusheni Miurangi	Won
2023	Raigam Tele'es	Janagatha Teledrama Award	Paara Dige	Won
2023	SLIM-Kantar Peoples Awards	Most Popular Teledrama	Paara Dige	Won

== See also ==
- Nadagamkarayo
