= Kusal Maduranga =

Sri Lankan actor (born 1993)

Kusal Maduranga කුසල් මධුරංග
- Born: 18 August 1993 (age 33); Nawalapitiya, Sri Lanka
- Education: University of the Visual and Performing Arts
- Occupation: Actor
- Years active: 2008–present
- Height: 1.68 m (5 ft 6 in)
- Awards: Most Popular Actor Award, Raigam Tele'es

Kusal Maduranga (born 18 August 1993; Sinhala: කුසල් මධුරංග) is an actor in Sri Lankan cinema, theatre and television, who began his television career with his role in the television series, Paara Dige in 2021. He won the Most Popular Actor Award at Raigam Tele'es, in 2022.

== Early life and education ==
Maduranga was born on 18 August 1993, in Nuwara Eliya, and later moved to Horana. He was sent to Palannoruwa central College for Primary Education and Vidyarathna Pirivena in Horana for secondary education. He attended University of the Visual and Performing Arts for higher education.

== Filmography ==
=== Notable stage dramas ===
- 361
- Atharamadiya as Nadira
- Harima Badu Thunak
- Pem Yuwalak One Kara Thibe
- Sihina Rangahala

=== Television ===
Year	Title	Role	Notes	Ref.
2021	Paara Dige	"Banda" Bandara/Nishantha Bandara/Nilantha Bandara (Note: Kusal Maduranga played a single character with two or more names.)	One of the lead roles	
2024	Paata Kurullo	Manjitha	One of the lead roles	
2024	Ralla Weralata Adarei			
2025	Taxikaraya			

=== Filmography ===
Key
†	Denotes films that have not yet been released

Year	Film	Role	Ref.
2024	Gini Avi Saha Gini Keli 2		
TBA	Shadow †		

== Awards ==
Award	Year	Work	Category	Result
Sumathi Awards	2023	Circus Kaarayo	Top 10 Most Popular Actors	Nominated
Raigam Tele'es	2023	Circus Kaarayo	Most Popular Actor	Nominated
Raigam Tele'es	2022	Paara Dige	Most Popular Actor	Won
National Drama Festival	2022	Sanduda Watenne Sikuradata	Best Actor	Nominated
National Youth Drama Festival	2019	Atharamediya	Best Supporting Actor	Won
National Youth Drama Festival	2019	Kepanam	Best Actor	Won
State Drama Festival	2016	Tap	Merit Award for Acting	Won
National Youth Drama Competition	2015	Orestas	Merit Award for Acting	Won
State Children's Drama Festival	2014	The Prince of the Land of Chocolate	Best Supporting Actor	Won
State Children's Drama Festival	2013	The Wonderful gift for Bob	Best Supporting Actor	Won
Sarathchandra Jayakody Drama Festival	2012	Accelayak Uda	Best Script Writing	Won
All Island Drama Festival	2010	Exhibition	Best Actor	Won
All Island Drama Festival	2007	Horagediya	Best Supporting Actor	Won
