= St. Thomas' College, Kotte =

Sri Lankan Catholic school

St. Thomas College
- ශාන්ත තෝමස් විද්‍යාලය

Location
- Sri Jayawardenepura (Kotte Road); Kotte; Sri Lanka
- 6.88208658958°N 79.9019765854°E

Information
- School type: National School
- Motto: In Fide Et Justitia (In Faith and Justice)
- Established: 8 May 1928; 98 years ago
- Founder: Zacharias Dabrera
- Principal: Nilantha Uduwaka
- Grades: 1–13
- Gender: Mixed
- Age range: 2 to 19
- Enrollment: 1,400
- Colors: Scarlet, white, and gold

St. Thomas College (Sinhala: ශාන්ත තෝමස් විද්‍යාලය) is a Catholic school in Kotte, Sri Lanka. A national school, it serves a mix of boys and girls, from grades 1 to 13.

== History ==
St. Thomas' College was established by Rev. Father Zacharias Dabrera, OMI, and formally opened by Rev. Father J. B. Meary, OMI, on 8 May 1928, the feast-day of St. Michael the Archangel, with 53 students. The new school was set up in the small verandah of the mission house, Debrera's residence. As the number of students increased the two wings of the church were used as classrooms. The school was provisionally registered on 9 June 1928. In 2017 the school had 1,400 students and 70 staff.

== Traditions ==
The school colours are scarlet, representing the love of work and sacrifice in the hearts of the pupils, white for the purity in their lives, and gold for perfection and success.

The school motto is Latin: In Fidia Et Justita.

== Sports and music ==
The school has produced many musicians and numerous outstanding cricketers.

=== Cricket ===
St Thomas' plays its annual Big Match, the Battle of Kotte, against Sri Jayawardenepura Maha Vidyalaya. The first Battle of Kotte was held in 1975 and has occurred on a regular basis for over forty years. Since 2007 both teams have also competed against each other in a one day match, for the Dr. G. N. Perera Memorial Trophy.

== Notable alumni ==
- Angeline Gunathilake, singer
- Nalin Perera, 46th Chief Justice of Sri Lanka
- Roger Seneviratne, actor, politician
- Andy Solomons, first-class cricketer
- Chandimal Jayasinghe, beautician, director of Miss World (Sri Lanka)

== Notable staff ==
- Maxwell Silva, former principal, Auxiliary Bishop of the Archdiocese of Colombo
