= Saman Lenin =

Sri Lankan Singer

Visharad Saman Lenin විශාරද සමන් ලෙනින්
- Born: Kottawa Iniyage Saman Thusitha Lenin Kumara; May 1, 1980 (age 46); Galle, Sri Lanka
- Education: St. Aloysius College
- Alma mater: University of the Visual & Performing Arts
- Occupations: Singer; musician; ethno-musicologist
- Awards: Best Singer
- Musical career
- Genres: Folk music; Indian classical
- Instrument: Vocals
- Years active: 2007–present
- Label: MEntertainment
- Website: samanlenin.com

Visharad Kottawa Iniyage Saman Thusitha Lenin Kumara (Sinhala: සමන් ලෙනින්; born 1 May 1980), popularly known as Saman Lenin, is a Sri Lankan vocalist, musician, and ethno-musicologist. He is popular in Sri Lanka as an exponent of Sri Lankan folk music, and incorporates traditional folk tunes into his music. Despite a relatively short career in the music industry thus far, he has sung over 200 songs, and is considered by many to be one of the most talented folk artists in Sri Lanka.

== Personal life ==
He was born on 1 May 1980 in the village called Kottava in Unawatuna, Galle, Sri Lanka as the fifth child of the family. His father Kottava Master was an art teacher. He received education at St. Aloysius College in Galle. At school, he was popular as an athlete where he was included to the school cricket team, swimming and bodybuilding team. He played in the college cricket team for the under 16 to under 19 team and later served as team leader. At that time Dennis Lillee selected 17 of the best school fast bowlers in Sri Lanka and did a bowling camp, where Lenin was among the 17 best fast bowlers in Sri Lanka. At that time, he also excelled in art and sculpture. He has four elder brothers and one younger sister.

In 2004, he entered University of the Visual & Performing Arts, in Colombo and obtained a degree in Ethno-musicology. Then he became a lecturer of the same university.

== Career ==
During his university life, Lenin learned folk music under renowned musicians such as Rohana Baddage and Saman Panapitiya. In 2005, he rose to prominence after contesting in 'Rajatha Rashmi', a musical reality contest organized by the Sri Lanka Rupavahini Corporation. Finally he won the second place in the contest. Then he was selected for the background singing for the film Siri Parakum directed by Somaratne Dissanayake. The song 'Ambaruvo' from the film had a special impact on establishing his different voice in the music industry in this country. He further established himself in the field of film background vocals and contributed to Prof. Sunil Ariyaratne's film Paththini and Lalith Pannipitiya's film Sangile.

He has gained popularity for his singing in a number of Sri Lankan teledramas and participated in many cultural events. In 2011 at the 8th Television State Awards, he won the Best Singer award for the serial Yasa Isuru. In 2014, he sang the theme song for the television serial Kolamba Ahasa for which in 2015, he won the award for the Best Vocalist at 2015 Sumathi Awards. In 2015, he started his solo musical concert 'Sneha Warsha'. The first concert was held at the Law Faculty of the University of Colombo. In the same year, he was awarded the Best Singer award at the State Music Awards. In 2016, he was awarded the Bunka Award by the Japan Friendship and Cultural Fund (JSFCF).

In 2017, he performed a concert called 'Gigurum Warsha' along with Nilakshi Halapitiya. In addition, he made another concert with Rohana Beddage for the first time with the tile 'Desaman Bedda'. Both concerts were also performed in Australia in 2019. In 2018, he won the Best Singer award at Raigam Tele'es for the serial Eliya Kanda. He has also sung in the film Siri Parakum, directed by Somaratne Dissanayake, the song Ambaruwo, which became famous. He has performed internationally many times in Australia, India, Thailand, Doha, Maldives, Dubai. On 9 June 2018, he participated to the musical concert 'Gee Mal Suwanda Gee Miyasi with Makaranda Pasvida Gayum Asiriya' held at the Nelum Pokuna Theater. In the same year, he sang the song 'Samasara Kanda Laga' which deals with the Samasara Hill Landslide tragedy. In 2019, he released the solo hits 'Amude' and 'Amude 2', both songs received large fanbase and popularity.

Apart from singing, he also worked as an actor. His maiden television acting came through the television serial Yasa Isuru. Then he acted in the serials Ransiri Mal and Paanamankada.

== Playback singing ==
Year	Film	Ref.
2012	Super Six	
2014	Siri Parakum	
2016	Paththini	
2018	Aladin Saha Puduma Pahana	
2019	Sangile	
