= Raigam Tele'es Most Popular Actor Award =

The Raigam Tele'es Most Popular Actor Award is presented annually in Sri Lanka by the Kingdom of Raigam for the most Popular Sri Lankan television actor of the year, determined by a publicly popular vote.

The award was first given in 2005. Following is a list of the winners of this award since 2005.

== Award winners ==
Year	Popular Actor	ref
2005	Roshan Pilapitiya	
2006	Sriyantha Mendis	
2007	Amila Abeysekara	
2008	Amila Abeysekara	
2009	Menaka Rajapakse	
2010	Menaka Rajapakse	
2011	Menaka Rajapakse	
2012	Saranga Disasekara	
2013	Saranga Disasekara	
2014	Jagath Chamila	
2015	Saranga Disasekara	
2016	Saranga Disasekara	
2017	Ruwan Perera	
2018	Thumindu Dodantenna	
2019	Raween Kanishka	
2020	Raween Kanishka	
2021	Kusal Maduranga	
2022	Uddika Premarathna	
2023	Saranga Disasekara	
2024	Uddika Premarathna	
2025	Uddika Premarathna	
2026	Chathuranga Kodithuwakku	
