= Hiru FM =

Colombo; Sri Lanka
- Frequencies: 96.1 MHz; 96.3 MHz

Programming
- Language: Sinhala
- Format: Contemporary

Ownership
- Owner: Asian Broadcasting Corporation
- Sister stations: Gold FM, Sun FM, Sooriyan FM, Shaa FM

History
- First air date: 1 July 1998

Links
- Website: www.hirufm.lk

Hiru FM (Sinhala: හිරු එෆ්එම්) is a Sinhala radio station in Sri Lanka owned by ABC Radio Networks. It covers the whole island.

== Awards ==
- Most Popular Radio Channel - International MACO Awards 2012
