= Sooriyan FM =

Tamil radio station in Sri Lanka

- Colombo; Sri Lanka
- Broadcast area: Sri Lanka
- Frequencies: Islandwide 103.4MHz, 103.6MHz.

Programming
- Language: Tamil
- Format: Contemporary
- Affiliations: Hiru Media Networks (ABC Radio Networks)

Ownership
- Owner: Asian Broadcasting Corporation
- Sister stations: Gold FM, Hiru FM, Sun FM and Shaa FM

History
- First air date: 1998 July 25th

Links
- Website: www.sooriyanfm.lk

Sooriyan FM (Tamil: சூரியன் எஃப்.எம்;‌ Sinhala: සූරියන් එෆ්එම්) is a privately owned Tamil radio station in Sri Lanka run by ABC Radio Networks started in 1998. It covers the whole island. The network runs sister stations Hiru FM and Shaa FM in Sinhala and Gold FM and Sun FM in English.

== About ==
- Island Wide - 103.4 MHz,103.6 MHz.

Sooriyan FM rated the number one Tamil radio channel as per the latest Listenership survey. According to LMRB (Lanka Marketing Research Bureau) ratings Sooriyan FM is continuing to lead the market and audience ratings in the Tamil radio industry in Sri Lanka for the 19th consecutive year.

Sooriyan FM, the Number 01 Tamil channel in Sri Lanka, a member of the Asia Broadcasting Corporation Private limited which is a Rayynor Silva Holdings company.

Sooriyan FM, the 1st private Tamil radio channel in Sri Lanka launched 12 years ago, is the market leader & the trend setter in Tamil radio. Its innovative programming strategy and the up to date news reporting has made Sooriyan FM the epitome in Tamil broadcasting.

Sooriyan FM is, as at now, a multi-award winning Radio Channel in Sri Lanka.

Asia Broadcasting Corporation Private Limited, a part of Rayynor Silva Holdings the owning company of Hiru FM/Gold FM/Sooriyan FM/Sun FM/Shaa FM, set up 12 years ago, revolutionized the Media industry setting up Sri Lanka's First Ever Private Tamil Channel -Sooriyan FM, Sri Lanka's First Ever English Oldies Channel -Gold FM, Sri Lanka's First Sinhala Youth Channel Shaa FM along with Sri Lanka's number one Sinhala radio channel Hiru FM and Sri Lanka's youth English trend setter Sun FM.

== Satellite ==
Sooriyan is also available via the Yamal 202 49.0° East satellite.

== See also ==
- List of Tamil-language radio stations
