= Mabola, Sri Lanka =

Mabola
- Urban Council
- Location in Sri Lanka
- Coordinates: 7°00′0″N 79°54′0″E
- Country: Sri Lanka
- Province: Western Province
- District: Gampaha District
- Zone: Kelaniya
- Police Division: Wattala

Population (2001)
  - Total: 29,880
- Time zone: +5.30

Mabola or Mabole is a town and Urban Council in Gampaha District in the Western Province of Sri Lanka. With Wattala it forms Wattala–Mabola urban council. It is located in Negombo road and it is the route for travel to Bandaranaike International Airport. The newly constructed, Sri Lanka's second E Class highway, Colombo - Katunayake Expressway E03 crosses to the seaside through Mabola.

== Education ==
Sinhala medium schools in Mabola are St.Mary's Maha Vidyalaya and Sri Siddhartha Maha Vidyalaya. There is only one Tamil medium Muslim school, Al-Asraff Maha Vidyalaya. Rawlathus Saliheen Ahadiya School is conducted in Mabola& Al- Asraff Ahadiya School

== Religious Sites ==
- Mabola Jum'ah Mosque
- St. Mary's Church
- Welikadamulla Temple
