= Travel with Wife =

Sri Lankan online travel adventure channel

Travel with wife
- Born: Panadura, Sri Lanka

YouTube information
- Channel: Travel with Wife
- Years active: 2018–present
- Genres: Adventure; travel
- Subscribers: 550 thousand
- Views: 73.4 million
- Last updated: 20 October 2025

Travel with Wife is a YouTube travel adventure channel created by Sri Lankans Kasun and Chamari Deegoda Gamage. The channel hosts travel videos of destinations around the world. The first video in the series was uploaded on May 4, 2018.

== Personal life ==
Deegoda Gamage Kasun Sampath was born on 27 July 1988 in Panadura. His father D.G Wajirawansa is a technician and his mother, M.D Somalatha is a homemaker. He has one younger sister. He completed his education at St.John's National School, Panadura. He is married to Undugodage Chamaranayani 'Chamari' Premarathne. Chamari was born on 1 November 1990 in Panadura. Her father U.M.M Premarathne is a businessman and her mother H.L.M Perera was a homemaker. She has one elder brother. She studied at Agamathi Balika Vidyalaya, Panadura. Chamari's mother died on 2 August 2021 due to COVID-19.

The couple has one daughter, Elina.

== History ==
First, they shot a video during the Kandy tour for their wedding anniversary. Even they took pictures of that trip, they did not post them. However, after they went to Gampola, they started to take travel photos and post them on social media such as Facebook and Instagram. After seeing their travel photos, Ideal Hell company started to provide the equipment and other help needed to create videos of better quality and content.

Meanwhile, they met popular television personality, Chathura Alwis who proposed the name Travel with Wife. They completed their first travel vlog on 4 May 2018 about Diyaluma Falls. Then they started to travel to many iconic places in Sri Lanka such as Ella, Sigirya, Jaffna, Pasikuda, Mirissa, Mannar, and Trincomalee and create videos and travel photos. In 2019, they collaborated with SriLankan Airlines to promote their Vesak event called 'The Spirit of SriLankan Airlines and magic of Vesak'. The video later won the Best Marketing Innovation at the 2020 APEX/IFSA Awards.

Later in 2019, the YouTube channel won the award for Most Popular influencer of the year at Raigam Social Media Awards (SoMe). In the same year, they were involved with Dell Technologies and Road to Rights Youth Organization to start the initiative to prevent plastic pollution within the waters of Sri Lanka and recycle those plastics. In 2021, they became ambassadors for Sustainable Development Goal 14 (SDG 14): "Life Below Water" in the youth-led national campaign called "#ActionToImpact" initiated by The Road to Rights, to accelerate the progress of localizing Sustainable Development Goals in Sri Lanka in supporting UN Decade of Action and contributing to the Global Week to #Act4SDGs.

== See also ==
- List of YouTubers
