= Hiru TV =

Sri Lankan television channel

Hiru TV හිරු TV
- Country: Sri Lanka
- Broadcast area: Sri Lanka
- Network: Asia Broadcasting Corporation
- Headquarters: World Trade Center, Colombo

Programming
- Language: Sinhalese
- Picture format: 1080p

Ownership
- Owner: Asia Broadcasting Corporation
- Key people: Rohana Ruwan Gopallawa (Chairman)

History
- Launched: 23 May 2012

Links
- Webcast: = www.hirutv.lk/hiruyoutubelive.php
- Website: www.hirutv.lk

Availability

Terrestrial
- TV Lanka Digital TV: Channel 2
- UHF (Kikiliyamana): Channel 38
- UHF (Badulla): Channel 23
- UHF (Colombo): Channel 45
- UHF (Gongala): Channel 45
- UHF (Hunnasgiriya): Channel 23
- UHF (Kurunegala): Channel 22
- UHF Nayabedda: Channel 22
- UHF (Ratnapura): Channel 21
- UHF Magalkanda: Channel 60 (reserved)

Hiru TV (Sinhala: හිරු ටීවී) is a television channel in Sri Lanka, founded by Rayynor Silva (Chairman) and owned by Asia Broadcasting Corporation. Hiru means 'sun' in Sinhala, the primary language of Sri Lanka. Hiru TV is Sri Lanka's first and only digital television channel which has the DVB-T2 pictures and stereo sounds. It currently holds all island coverage. Its programme content includes Teledramas, Music, Movies, Documentaries, Entertainment, Political, Children's Programmes and News.

== Programming ==
Programme Type	Current	Finished
Teledramas	Chanchala Rekha	Akuru Maki Ne
Teledramas	Chanchala Rekha	Husmak Tharamata
Teledramas	Chanchala Rekha	Hathe Kalliya
Teledramas	Chanchala Rekha	Gemunu Maharaja
Teledramas	Divithura	Kiruli
Teledramas	Divithura	Sada Pini Bidaka
Teledramas	Divithura	Wassane Premaya
Teledramas	Divithura	Sihinayaki Jeevithe
Teledramas	Adarei Man Adarei 2	Brahma Muhurthaya
Teledramas	Adarei Man Adarei 2	Rella Weralata Adaraei
Teledramas	Adarei Man Adarei 2	Wahi Lihini
Teledramas	Adarei Man Adarei 2	Yakada Pahanthira
Teledramas	Tharu Adare	Sakisada Suwaris
Teledramas	Tharu Adare	Sneha
Teledramas	Tharu Adare	Binara Mali
Teledramas	Tharu Adare	Sabada Babanis
Teledramas	Sihina Genena Kumariye	Devi
Teledramas	Sihina Genena Kumariye	Shadow
Teledramas	Sihina Genena Kumariye	Maha Viru Pandu
Teledramas	Sihina Genena Kumariye	Urumayaka Aragalaya
Sansara Sakmana (Poson Teledrama)	Special Teledramas	Amisa Pooja (Vesak Teledrama)
Altharaya Pamula (X'mas Drama)	Special Teledramas	Amisa Pooja (Vesak Teledrama)
Music	Countdown	Koha Ira
Music	Hiru Top 10	Koha Ira
Music	Bohoth Sundar (Bollywood show)	Koha Ira
Music	Sandagiri Muduna	Koha Ira
Music	Hiru Mega Blast	Koha Ira
Documentaries	Cyber Crime	Jail
Documentaries	Cyber Crime	Uththareethara
Documentaries	Hiru Shraddaabhiwandana	Travel And Living
Documentaries	Hiru Shraddaabhiwandana	Adisi Ra 10
Documentaries	Kasawatha (Each Poya Day)	Art Cafe
Documentaries	Kasawatha (Each Poya Day)	Theveni Aesa
Entertainment	Vindaneeya Udesana	Mega Bite
Entertainment	Top Light	My Clip
Entertainment	Daanna 5K	Kaha Ira In A Minute
Entertainment	Copy Chat	Master Cook
Entertainment	Mangalam	Hiru Golden Film Award
Entertainment	Sorry Honde	Niro & The Stars
Entertainment	Dehadaka Adare	A team B team
Entertainment	Charitha Thunak	A team B team
Entertainment	Meka Puduma Lokayak	Showtime with Niro
Entertainment	Tharu Walalla	Showtime with Niro
Political	Balaya	
Political	Rata Saha Heta	
Political	Salakuna	
News	Hiru TV News	
News	Paththare Visthare	

දිවි තුරා

== International TV series broadcast ==
- Indulekha as Indulekha
- Yeh Un Dinon Ki Baat Hai as Season Ticket
- Silsila Badalte Rishton Ka as Sihinayaka Seya
- Choti Sarrdaarni as Sith Ahase Aadaren
- Ishq Mein Marjawan 2 as Prema Sandagira Pamula
- Shubharambh as As Dekata Horen
- Anupamaa as Anupama
- Endless Love as Nimak Nethi Mage Adare
- Ek Hasina Thi as Sulanga Wage Awidin
- Jodha Akbar as Jodha Akbar
- Prem Ya Paheli – Chandrakanta as Sandata Diwura Kyannam
- Ek Tha Raja Ek Thi Rani as Heenayakda Me
- Udaan as Doni
- Baal Veer as Soorayangeth Sooraya
- Siya Ke Ram as Rama Seeta Ravana
- Brahmarakshas as Adara Mayawa
- Kesari Nandan as Diriya Doni
- Kumkum Bhagya as Adareyi Man Adareyi
- RadhaKrishn as Krishna
- Adını Feriha Koydum as Ruma
- Camelot - season 1, 2
- Merlin - season 1, 2, 3, 4, 5
- Strike Back - season 1, 2, 3, 4
- Atlantis - season 1, 2
- Sinbad
- Game of Thrones - season 1, 2, 3, 4
- The Flash - season 1, 2
- Arrow - season 1, 2, 3, 4
- Agents of S.H.I.E.L.D. - season 1
- Aşk Laftan Anlamaz as Thamath Adare Naththanm
- Natchwatch as Chanchala Maya

== International cartoon and program series broadcast ==
- Ben 10 as Ben 10
- Shaun the Sheep as Sellanda Shaun
- Pluto
- Master Raindrop as Diya Dagaya
- Miraculous Ladybug as Rathu Chooti
- Roll No 21 as Soora Weera Batta
- Tayo the Little Bus as Premi Katunagala
- Krishna Aur Balram as Krishna
- Kumbh Karan as Thadiyay Kadiyay
- Robin Hood: Mischief in Sherwood as Robin Hood
- Zorro:The Chronicles as Zorro
- Guru Aur Bhole as Guru Ko Bole
- ViR: The Robot Boy as Viki The Robot Boy
- Lassie as Lassie
- The Powerpuff Girls as Hada Wada Kello
- Dexter's Laboratory as Gadget Podda
- M.A.D. as MAD
