= Anula Vidyalaya =

Coordinates: 6°52′N 79°53′E

- Nugegoda; Sri Lanka

Information
- Type: National
- Motto: Pali: Uththitta Nappa majjeyya (Arise and be Diligent for Mother Anula)
- Religious affiliation: Buddhist
- Established: 4 January 1941; 85 years ago
- Founder: E. W. Adikaram
- Principal: M.S.R.Irangani
- Grades: 1-13
- Gender: Female
- Age range: 6 to 19
- Enrollment: 4700+
- Colors: Black and Gold
- Alumni: Anulians
- Website: www.anulavidyalaya.org

Anula Vidyalaya is a national girls' school in Colombo. It was established in 1941 by E. W. Adikaram with 38 students and five teachers.

Currently, the school has a student body of over 4700 girls. The principal and the staff guide the pupils on the Buddhist principles of non-violence and self-discipline.

== History ==
The founders of Anula Vidyalaya were E. W. Adikaram, a scholar, educationist, writer, philosopher and a humanist, and the pioneer principal, P. B. Fernando. The school was started on 4 January 1941 under the patronage of D. S. Senanayake, then the Minister of Agriculture. The Board of Governors were: P. B. Fernando, D. P. Malalasekara, R. W. Rupasinghe, D. D. Kodagoda, D. L. F. Pedris, T. U. de Silva, R. Premaratne, N. Wijasooriya, S. R. Wijethilake, Nirmala Ekanayake, and Nanda Rajapaksha.

Pioneer Principal - P. B. Fernando - served the school from 1941 till 1956. She donated her total salary towards obtaining a block of land for the school and a scholarship scheme.

== Principals ==
- P. B. Fernando 1941–1956
- N. Ratnapala 1956–1970
- C. K. Abeyrathna 1971–1975
- D. S. Meegoda 1976–1985
- Leelananda 1985–1987
- M. K. Welikala 1987–1988
- D. W. Windsor 1989–1991
- N. P. Jinasena 1991–2000
- Y. P. S. C. Jayathilake 2000–2007
- S. N. Malawiaarachchi 2007–2010
- Kalyani Gunasekara 2010–2013
- N. K. Ekanayake 2013–2014
- P. N. Rajapaksha 2014–2017
- K. A. Jayani Prishangika 2017–2020
- Anoma Dahanayake 2020 - 2021
- Ashini Kodithuwakku 2022 (10 months)
- Vishaka Rajapaksha 2022 - 2023
- M. S. R. Irangani 2023 to present

== Houses ==
- Sanghamiththa -
- Uppalawanna -
- Dhammadinna -
- Chulasumana -
