= Chandimal Jayasinghe =

Sri Lankan beautician and philanthropist

- චන්දිමාල් ජයසිංහ
- Born: Jayasinghe Arachchige Chandima Nuwan; May 31, 1983 (age 43); Colombo, Sri Lanka
- Education: St. Thomas' College, Kotte
- Occupations: Bridal designer; entrepreneur; philanthropist
- Years active: 2000 – present
- Website: https://artofliving.lk/listing/salon-chandimal/

Jayasinghe Arachchige Chandima Nuwan (born 31 May 1983; Sinhala: චන්දිමාල් ජයසිංහ), popularly known as Chandimal Jayasinghe, is a Sri Lankan cosmetologist, entrepreneur and philanthropist.

He is known for organizing bridal competitions, Miss Sri Lanka and Miss World competitions as well as his royal birthday parties. He is the national director of Mrs. World (Sri Lanka).

== Early life and education ==
He was born on 31 May 1983 in Beddagana, Pitakotte, Colombo, Sri Lanka, to a family with two siblings. His father, Jayasinghe Arachchige Chandradasa, had a food stall. His mother is Kuruvitage Gunawathi Silva, a housewife. He has one elder sister, Chandani. His father died in 2017 after a brief illness.

He completed education at St. Thomas' College, Kotte up to the ordinary level.

== Career ==
In his teenage years, he did several computer courses without any success. Then he started to make flowers and also hair styling. At the age of 16, he started to make bridal designs after seeing the wedding of his sister. His first make-up came through a music video. Meanwhile, he got the opportunity to become the chief beautician of the reality dance competition Sirasa Dancing Star.

In 2004, Jayasinghe established his beauty salon. Meanwhile, he worked as a makeup artist for various television stations.

On 1 March 2012, he made the wedding make-up for actress Himali Sayurangi. After the wedding, he received several bridal make-up invitations from celebrities. In the meantime, he became a member of the Dayaka Sabha of Kotte Rajamaha Vihara and had been a Basnayake Nilame of the temple as well.

He is also the official make-up artist of former Mrs. World, actress, and politician Rosy Senanayake.

He is popular due to arranging royal birthday parties in Sri Lanka. In 2017, he organized his royal birthday party at The Kingsbury hotel with a Bollywood theme. For his birthday party in 2018 at the Shangri-La Hotel, around 800 participated, including 80 journalists.

In 2018, he became the National Director of Mrs. World (Sri Lanka) and co-produced the event with The Colombo Lifestyle Company. Then in 2019, he did not celebrate his birthday due to the Sri Lanka Easter bombings. He later used his birthday for charity works.

In 2019, he became the organizer of an international level Mrs. Sri Lanka competition at the invitation of Rosy Senanayake.

In 2020, he did make-up for Caroline Jurie in the Mrs. World pageant.

== Personal life ==
On 30 May 2021, he was arrested, along with actress and model Piumi Hansamali, for organizing a birthday party at Shangri-La Colombo with the participation of 15–20 more people during the event thereby breaching the COVID-19 health guidelines. He was later released on bail on 1 June 2021 along with Hansamali.
