= Hunnasgiriya =

Coordinates: 7°18′N 80°51′E

- Village
- Interactive map of Hunnasgiriya
- Country: Sri Lanka
- Province: Central Province
- Elevation: 900 m (3,000 ft)
- Time zone: UTC+5:30 (Sri Lanka Standard Time)

Hunnasgiriya is a village in Sri Lanka. It is located within Central Province. Hunnasigiriya is one of the entry points to the Knuckles massif. It is in the southern part of the Knuckles Mountain Range. Majority of the living people is Tamil. Annual average rainfall is 2,500 mm (98 in) and the average temperature is 22 °C (72 °F).

== See also ==
- List of towns in Central Province, Sri Lanka
