= Gongala =

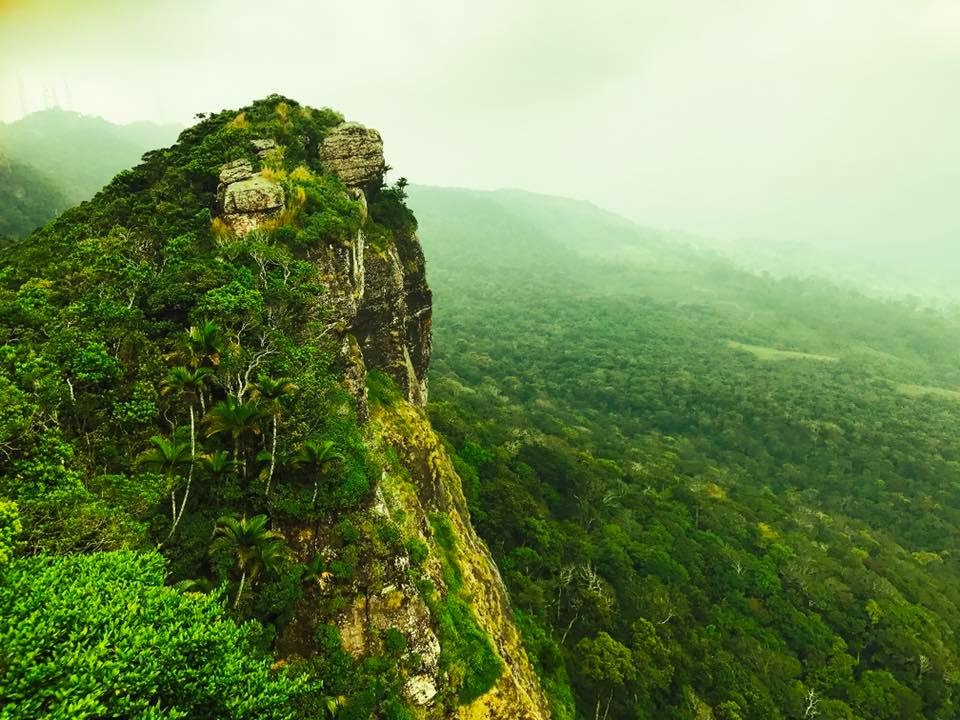

Highest point
- Elevation: 1,358 m (4,455 ft)
- Coordinates: 6°23′09″N 80°39′14″E

Geography
- Location within Sri Lanka
- Location: Rakwana

Gongala is a mountain in the Ratnapura District of Sri Lanka. At a summit elevation of 1,358 m (4,455 ft). It is the 15th tallest mountain in Sri Lanka.

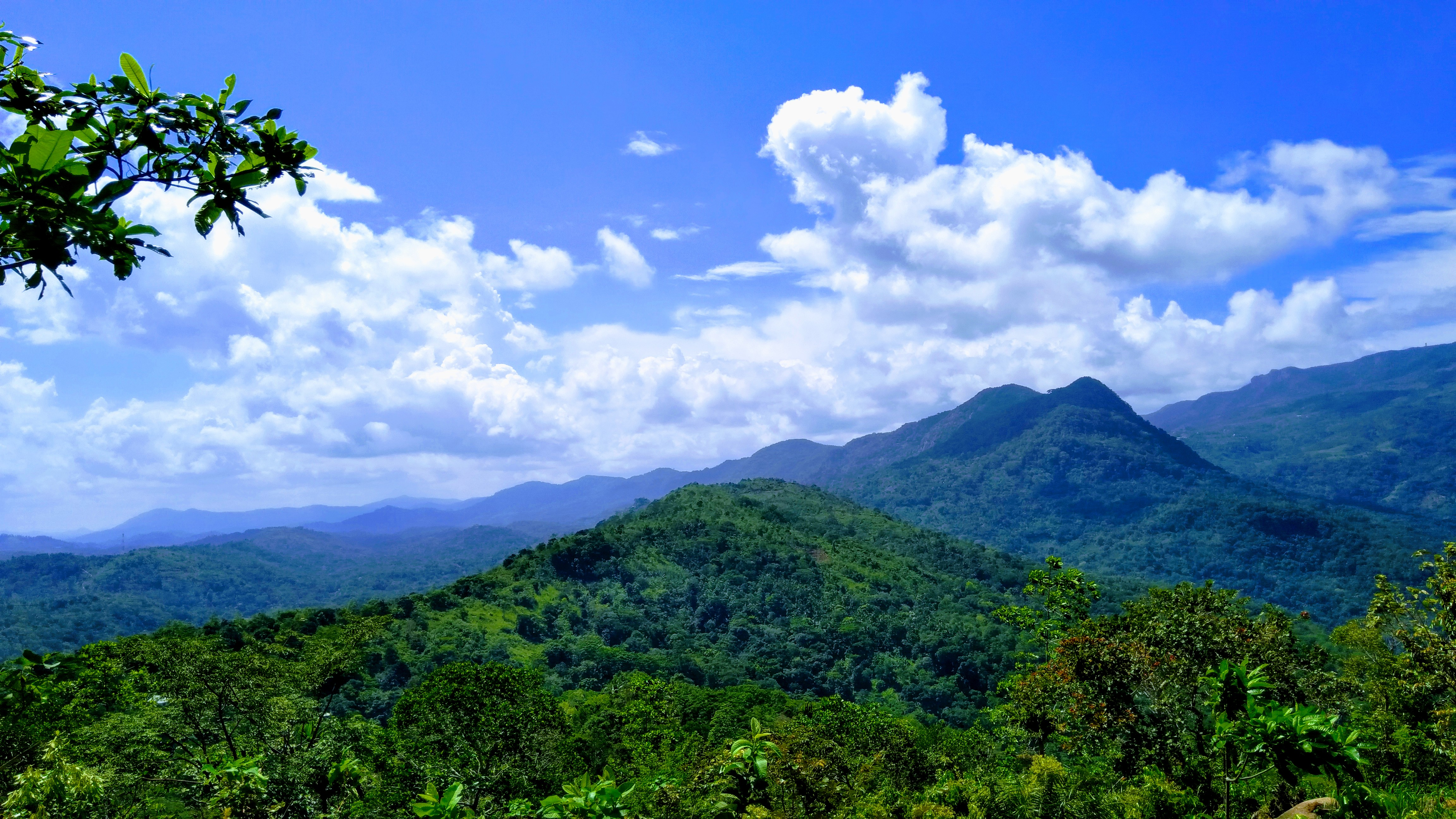
Region around Gongala.

== Folklore ==
The name of Gongala means Cow Rock. According to folklores, the shape of this mountain top is the shape of a cow head. Another folklore is that a long time ago many cows lived around the Gongala mountain range.

== See also ==
- List of mountains of Sri Lanka
