= Nanda Malini =

Sri Lankan musician (1943–2026)

- නන්දා මාලනී
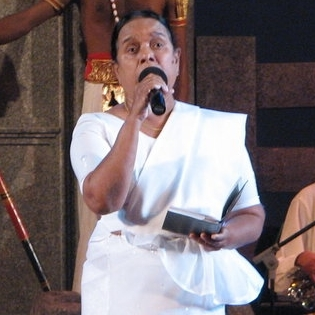
- Malini in 2006
- Born: Mirihana Arachchige Nanda Malini Perera; 23 August 1943; Kotahena, British Ceylon
- Died: 20 August 2026 (aged 82); Nawala, Sri Lanka
- Education: Heywood Institute of Art; Bhatkhande Music Institute (1963); Sri Gunananda Vidyalaya
- Occupation: Singer
- Spouse: Suneth Gokula (Former)
- Children: 2
- Parents: Mirihana Arachchige Vincent Perera (father); Liyanage Emily Perera (mother)
- Awards: Doctor of Philosophy (Fine Arts) Honoris Causa (University of the Visual & Performing Arts – 2017)
- Musical career
- Genres: Pop; soul; rhythm and blues; Indian classical music
- Instrument: Vocals
- Years active: 1956–2026
- Labels: Singlanka/Tharanga/Nilwala; MEntertainment; Ransilu

Mirihana Arachchige Nanda Malini Perera (Sinhala: මිරිහාන ආරච්චිගේ නන්දා මාලනී පෙරේරා; 23 August 1943 – 20 August 2026), popularly known as Nanda Malini (නන්දා මාලනී), was a Sri Lankan musician. One of the best-known and most honoured singers of Sri Lanka, Malini's choice of singing themes is based on real-life and socio-cultural situations. Her songs have intricate notional ideas of relationships, life-circumstances, and emotions that stem out of human realities.

== Early life ==
Nanda Malini was born in Lewwanduwa in Aluthgama, Ceylon on 23 August 1943, as the fourth child to a rural family of nine. Her father, Vincent Perera, was a skilful tailor and ready-made coat maker. Her mother, Liyanage Emily Perera, was a housewife. She had four sisters and four brothers. She moved to Kotahena in Colombo as an adolescent and was admitted to Sri Gunananda Vidyalaya, where she came under the tutelage of T. N. Margaret Perera.

She was married to Suneth Gokula, and the couple had two daughters – Varuni Saroja and Ama Sarada. The elder daughter Varuni is married to Chaminda, son of popular lyricist Dharmasiri Gamage. The younger daughter Ama is married to Sanjeewa.

== Career ==
In 1956, she contested the Padya Gayana competition held at Borella YMBA, in which she won a gold medal. After winning the poetry contest, W. D. Amaradeva, then at Radio Ceylon, invited Malini to take part in a song. She sang the song Budu Sadu written by Asoka Colombage and set to music by D. D. Danny on Karunaratne Abeysekera's popular radio programme Lama Mandapaya. In 1963, Amaradeva selected Malini as a background singer for the film Ranmuthu Duwa, the first Sinhala colour film. She sang the song Galana Gagaki Jeewithe (Sinhala: ගලන ගඟකි ජීවිතේ) with Narada Disasekara, the first song written by Chandraratne Manawasinghe for cinema. The film won all the Sarasavi awards for music that year and Malini won the award for Best Female Singer, her first major award. Later, she sang in many films and won 11 Sarasavi awards, 8 Presidential awards and was adjudged the most popular female vocalist from 1995–98.

Malini continued her training after achieving fame, learning under B. Victor Perera. She studied for a year at the Heywood Institute of Art and moved on to Bhatkhande Music Institute in Lucknow, India in 1963. She would later return to the University to obtain a Visharada degree in 1984 with a First Division Distinction.

Upon her return to Sri Lanka, Malini appeared on Amaradeva's programme Madhuvanthi singing the songs Sannaliyane and Ran Dahadiya Bindu Binds. Malini had a string of successful releases. Her lyrics depict realistic life situations, love, relationships, and emotions. The songs Pipunu Male Ruwa, Sudu Hamine, and Kada Mandiye attest to her effort to expose the hearts of women. Some of Malini's popular songs, such as Manda Nawa Karanawa, show a humorous and sensitive account of a young woman's experience of loneliness.

In 1971, Malini collaborated with Amaradewa in the Srawana Aradhana concert. In 1973, she started her first solo concert series, and after having 530 shows the series ended on 22 May 1979. In August 1981 she started another concert series Sathyaye Geethaya. She played 500 shows and ended in August 1984. She conducted her next solo musical concert series Pavana in June 1987 which ran for 18 months with 205 shows. Her songs in Pavana were banned in SLBC and SLRC where the concert was also banned. After 22 years her newest solo musical concert titled Shwetha Rathriya was held with the collaboration of Sirasa FM in 2010.

In 1984, she established a music academy Nanda Malini Ashram.

She produced 25 cassettes such as Malata Renu, Saadu Naada and Sari Podiththak. On 8 September 2007, she launched her CD Etha Kandu Yaye comprising a collection of 16 award-winning songs. The launching ceremony was held at the BMICH Open Air Theatre at 7.30 p.m. In 1993, she composed a CD Kunkuma Pottu which has songs sung in Tamil. Another of her CD's titled Andaharaya is made up of music composed of computer software.

In 2017, the honorary degree Darshana Shuri, Doctor of Philosophy of Fine Arts, was conferred on her by the University of Visual and Performing Arts. It was the first time that a female artist was recognized by a university in Sri Lanka.

== Death and legacy ==
Malini died on 20 August 2026, three days before her 83rd birthday.

In 2004, a hybrid orchid was named "Nanda Malini Ascosanda" in honour of Nanda Malini.

== Albums ==
=== Saadu Naada (Sinhala: සාදු නාද) ===
Saadu Naada

Soundtrack album by Nanda Malini
- Released: 2017
- Genres: Classical, blues, folk
- Length: 36:10

- "Budu Saadu" (Sinhala: බුදු සාදු)
- "Buddhanubhawena" (Sinhala: බුද්ධානුභාවේන)
- "Budu Karunaa" (Sinhala: බුදු කරුණා)
- "Aku Daa" (Sinhala: අකු දා)
- "Danno Budunge" (Sinhala: දන්නෝ බුදුන්ගේ)
- "Lokananda Thilona" (Sinhala: ලෝකානන්ද තිලෝනා)
- "Seela Samadhi" (Sinhala: ශීල සමාධි)
- "Muni Nandana Siripaada" (Sinhala: මුණි නන්දන සිරිපාද)

=== Sari Podiththak (Sinhala: සාරි පොඩිත්තක්) ===
Sari Podiththak

Soundtrack album by Nanda Malini
- Released: 2017
- Genres: Classical, blues, folk
- Length: 49:31

- "Ruk Aththana Mala Mudune" (Sinhala: රුක් අත්තන මල මුදුනේ)
- "Surangeeta Duka Hithuna" (Sinhala: සුරංගීට දුක හිතුනා)
- "Wasanawa Aege Nethai" (Sinhala: වාසනාව ඇගේ නෙතයි)
- "Miriwadi Sangalak" (Sinhala: මිරිවැඩි සඟලක්)
- "Sari Podiththak" (Sinhala: සාරි පොඩිත්තක්)
- "Sakura Mal Pipila" (Sinhala: සකුරා මල් පිපිලා)
- "Sudu Haamine" (Sinhala: සුදු හාමිනේ)
- "Ran Giri Giri Gigiri" (Sinhala: රන් ගිරි ගිරි ගිගිරි)
- "Chandra Mandulu Yata" (Sinhala: චන්ද්‍ර මඬුලු යට)
- "Mal Kiyanne Kaata Kaata" (Sinhala: මල් කියන්නෙ කාට කාට)
- "Mihimandale Anduru Kuse" (Sinhala: මිහි මඬලේ අඳුරු කුසේ)
- "Deega Nogiya Punchi Nanda" (Sinhala: දීග නොගිය පුංචි නැන්දා)
- "Mage Sina Oba Araganna" (Sinhala: මගේ සිනා ඔබ අරගන්න)
- "Mal Mal Heenaya" (Sinhala: මල් මල් හීනය)
- "Wessa Walaahaka" (Sinhala: වැස්ස වළාහක)
- "Buddhaanubhaawena" (Sinhala: බුද්ධානුභාවේන)
- "Sannaliyané""
- "Ran Dahadiya Bindu Bindu"
- "Pipunu Malé Ruwa"
- "Sudu Haminé"
- "Kadamandiyé"
- "Manda Nava Karanne"
- "Kinduriyakagé Vilapaya"
- "Malmada Bisaw"

=== Sansara Sagare ===
Sansara Sagare

Soundtrack album by Nanda Malini
- Released: 1985
- Genres: Classical, folk
- Label: Tharanga

- "Peedena Goyame" (Lyrics by Sunil Ariyaratne; music by Stanley Peries)
- "Sanda Mala" (Lyrics by Kularatne Ariyawansa; music by Rohana Weerasinghe)
- "Sansara Sagare" (Lyrics by Sunil Ariyaratne; music by Sarath Dassanayake)
- "Ma Pidu" (Lyrics by Kularatne Ariyawansa; music by Stanley Peries)
- "Kothanada Oba" (Lyrics by Sunil Ariyaratne; music by Stanley Peries)
- "Wata Kotu" (Lyrics by Tilak Kuruwita Bandara; music by Rohana Weerasinghe)
- "Nil Latha Pura" (Lyrics by Kularatne Ariyawansa; music by Sarath Dassanayake)
- "Punchi Punchi" (Lyrics by Kularatne Ariyawansa; music by Stanley Peries)
- "Lowe Sonduru" (Lyrics by Kularatne Ariyawansa; music by Rohana Weerasinghe)
- "Wasanawan" (Lyrics by Kularatne Ariyawansa; music by Rohana Weerasinghe)
- "Dura Atha" (Lyrics by Camilus Perera; music by Sarath Dassanayake)
- "Yowun Wasanthe" (Lyrics by Sunil Ariyaratne; music by Sarath Dasanayake)

== Discography ==
- Perada Maha Ra
- Pahan Kanda
- Sathyaye Geethaya
- Hemanthayedi
- Tharuka Es, Pavana
- Sindu Hodiya
- Kinduriyakage Vilapaya
- Madhu Bandun
- Tharu
- Malmada Bisau
- Cinema Geethavalokana
- Kirimadu Vel
- Londonyedi Geyu Gee
- Yathra, Handahami
- Sanka Padma
- Pembara Lanka
- Kunkuma Pottu
- Gramaphone Gee
- Araliya Landata
- Malata Renu
- Nilambare
- Sari Podittak
- Pirith Pen
- Katu Gana Kolaya Meda (Yukthiye Ayukthiya

== Awards ==
Malini won numerous awards in Sri Lanka including National Awards, popular awards and awards in film and television backgrounds singing.

=== Sarasaviya Awards ===
Year	Nominee / work	Award	Result
1964	Ranmuthu Duwa	Best Female Vocalist	Won
1966	Saaravita	Best Female Vocalist	Won
1969	Aadayawanthayo	Best Female Vocalist	Won
1968	Sandol Kandulu	Best Female Vocalist	Won
1980	Monarathenna	Best Female Vocalist	Won
1981	Siriboo Aiya	Best Female Vocalist	Won
1982	vajira	Best Female Vocalist	Won
1983	Yasa Isuru	Best Female Vocalist	Won
1988	Saharawe Sihinaya	Best Female Vocalist	Won
1994	Ambu Semiyo	Best Female Vocalist	Won
2002	Sudu Sevanali	Best Female Vocalist	Won
2020	The Newspaper	Best Female Vocalist	Won

=== Presidential Film Awards ===
Year	Nominee / work	Award	Result
1980	Hada Haawan Hade	Best Female Vocalist	Won
1981	Siribo Aiya	Best Female Vocalist	Won
1982	Sahara Peranimithi	Best Female Vocalist	Won
1983	Yasa Isuru	Best Female Vocalist	Won
1984	Siwraga Sena	Best Female Vocalist	Won
2020	The Newspaper	Best Female Vocalist	Won

=== Nelson Most Popular Award ===
Year	Nominee / work	Award	Result
1994	Popular	Most Popular Female Vocalist	Won

=== Derana Film Awards ===
Year	Nominee / work	Award	Result
2024	Contribution to cinema	Derana Film Awards Lifetime Achievement	Won

=== Other awards ===
- Dhashan Soori – University of Visual Arts of Sri Lanka
