= Nuwandhika Senarathne =

Sri Lankan singer (born 1994)

- නුවන්ධිකා සේනාරත්න
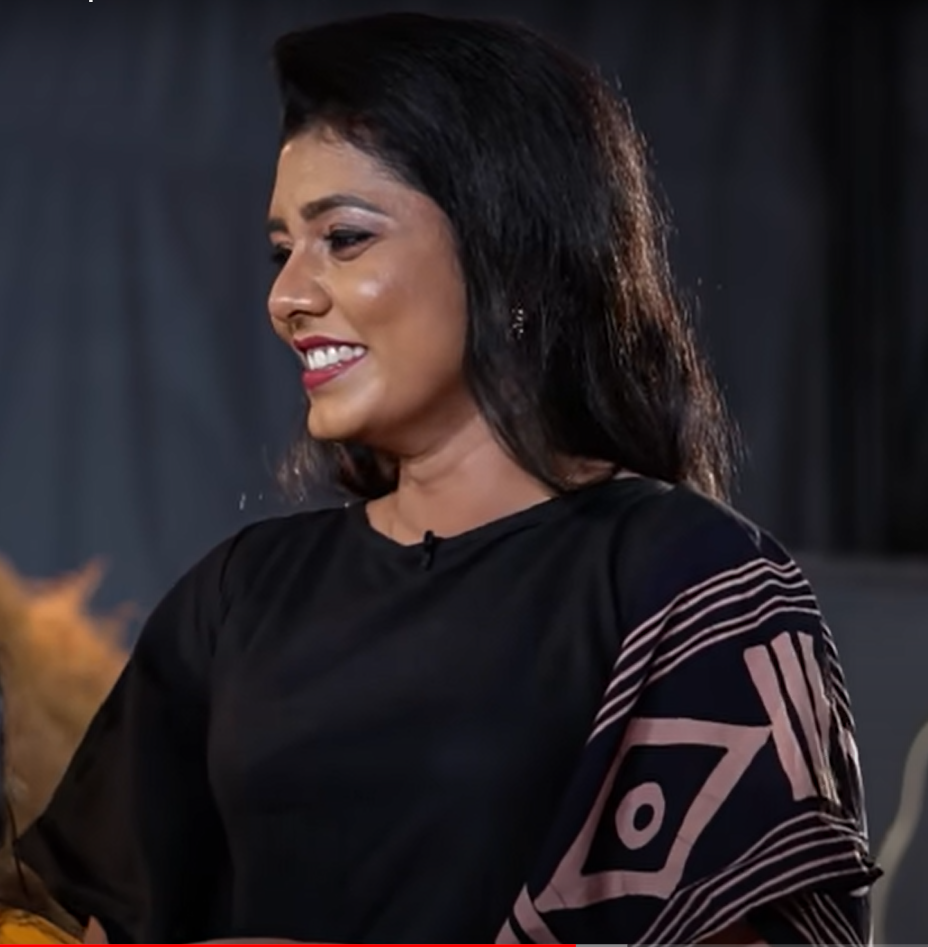
- Born: Nuwandhika Senarathne; 23 June 1993 (age 33); Narammala, Sri Lanka
- Education: Mayurapada Central College; University of the Visual and Performing Arts, University of Kelaniya
- Occupations: Singer; musician
- Years active: 2020–present
- Spouse: Jayanga Kaushalya (m.2023)
- Awards: 2nd in Derana Dream Star Season IX
- Website: nuwandhikasenarathne.com

Nuwandhika Senarathne (born 23 June 1993) is a Sri Lankan singer and television personality who is most known as a playback singer, as well as a performer of Soprano Opera and Ghazals. She rose to fame as the 1st runner-up of the reality TV show Derana Dream Star Season IX.

Nuwandhika has been praised for her "amazing vocal abilities and charisma", and hailed for her stellar vocal poise. She earned her first award nomination for the Best Teledrama Singer – Female at the 2019-20 Raigam Tele'es Awards, for singing the theme song of Asanwara Wessak which aired on ITN.

== Early life ==
Nuwandhika Senarathne was born on 23 June 1993 in Narammala, Sri Lanka. She is the only child of Sunil Senarathne and Kusum Herath. She grew up in Narammala, a small town near Kurunegala. She completed her primary education at Mayurapada Primary school, Narammala. Then she attended Mayurapada Central College to complete her secondary education. She completed her Visharad Diploma in 2011 before entering the university for higher education.

She studied western music at the University of the Visual and Performing Arts and completed her university degree (Bachelor of Performing Arts Honours degree specialised in Western Music) in 2019 with a Second Class Upper division. She is an A-Grade singer at Sri Lanka Broadcasting Corporation.

Nuwandhika is currently studying for a Master of Philosophy (MPhil.) degree in Music at the University of Kelaniya.

== Career ==
Nuwandhika started to learn music formally when she was ten years old. She entered into Saundarya Abhimani competition(division of GHAZAL) in 2019 and won the first place and received grand prize of a full sponsorship to represent her university in the South Asian Inter-university Music Festival in India. In 2020, she competed in the TV reality show Derana Dream Star season IX and won the second place in the competition.

"Where voice is simply music"

— Nuwandhika Senarathne

In October 2020, she voiced the theme song "Obata Lanvee" with Raween Kanishka for FM Derana "Apoorva" radio drama. She was pushed more into the public sphere after she sang the theme song Sihinayak Mewna in March, 2021, for the Iskole teledrama, which was broadcast on TV Derana. Following this surge in fame, in August 2021, she voiced the theme song "Malen Upan Samanali" with Raween Kanishka for TV Derana, Deweni Inima tele drama, which has reached over 15 million views on YouTube as of April 2022.

Nuwandhika initiated her film playback singing career in January 2021, when she voiced a duet with Supun Perera for the Sada Diya Salu movie directed by Channa Perera. In the same year, she sang the song Heeneka Paya for the film Kabaddi.

In addition to being a singer, she has hosted a TV program in TV Derana. Nuwandhika has taken part in the popular chat TV shows Maathra in Swarnawahini, and Sihinayaki Re in Rupavahini, on several occasions. Furthermore, she is a brand ambassador for SLTMobitel.

In December 2021, Nuwandhika toured Dubai with veteran musician Keerthi Pasqual for a musical evening at the Radisson Blu Deira Creek Hotel. Moreover, in May 2022, she toured Australia as a part of the Derana Stars Concert 2022 organised by TV Derana, featuring fellow contemporary singers Falan Andrea, Dulanga Sampath, Raween Kanishka, Ravi Royster, and veteran musicians Nadeeka Guruge and Keerthi Pasqual. Nuwandhika was set to tour Canada in June 2022 for the Dream Voices Canada Tour 2022 with fellow artists Falan Andrea and Suneera Sumanga; however, the tour got postponed owing to unavoidable circumstances, with the new dates yet to be announced. On March 22, 2024, the new dates for the postponed Dream Voices Canada Tour was announced, with Lavan Abhishek replacing Falan Andrea.

== Personal life ==
Nuwandhika married software engineer Jayanga Kaushalya on 27 January 2023.

== Tours ==
Year	Date	Venue
2021	17 December	Radisson Blu Deira Creek Hotel, Dubai
2022	20 May	Bunjil Place Concert Hall, Melbourne
2022	22 May	Concourse Concert Hall, Sydney
2022	1 October	Forrest Hill, Auckland
2022	8 October	Dubai, UAE
2022	TBA	Surrey, British Columbia
2022	TBA	Edmonton, Alberta
2022	TBA	Pauline-Boutal Hall, Winnipeg
2022	TBA	Toronto, Ontario
2022	TBA	Ottawa, Ontario

== Milestones ==
- "A" grade award granted by Sri Lanka Broadcasting Corporation.
- Won first place from All Island CALYPSO competition, 2011.
- Won first place from Saundarya Abhimani competition, division of GHAZAL, 2019.
- Performed on 12th South Asian Inter-university Music Festival (SAUFEST) held at Pandit Ravishankar Shukla University, Raipur, India, 2019.
- Graduated (BPA(Hons.) specialized in western music) from University of the Visual and Performing Arts with a second class upper division, 2019.

== Awards ==
Year	Nominee / work	Award	Result
2021	Mala Hiru Basa Yana - Asanwara Wessak - ITN	Raigam Tele'es Best Teledrama Singer(Female)	Nominated
2024	Mala Hiru Basa Yana - Asanwara Wessak - ITN	State Music Awards - Best Singer (Female) of the Year	Won

=== Achievements ===
Year	Competition	Venue	Position
2019	Saundarya Abhimani competition, division of GHAZAL	Sri Lanka	1st
2011	All Island CALYPSO competition	Sri Lanka	1st
2020	Derana Dream Star	Sri Lanka	1st
2012	All Island GHAZAL competition	Sri Lanka	1st
2015	University wide Western Singing competition	Sri Lanka	1st

== Playback singing ==
=== Film songs ===
Year	Film	Song	Composer(s)	Writer(s)	Co-singer(s)	Ref
2023	Sinhabahu	Gangawe Geethaya	Saman Panapitiya	Somarathne Dissanayake		
2021	Kabaddi (2021 film)	Heeneka Paya	Hashan Chandima	Gihan Anushka Ilangakoon	Amal Perera	

=== Teledrama songs ===
Year	Teledrama	Song	Composer(s)	Writer(s)	Co-singer(s)	Ref
2023	Raajini - TV Derana	Man Gawalu	Thilina Tharaka	Anoma Wijayawardane	Dinelka Muthuarachchi	
2023	Rosa - TV Derana	Paya Paya	Nimesh Kulasinghe	Kusala Vidanapathirana	Harsha Dhanosh	
2023	Rosa - TV Derana	Muthu Muthu Naade	Nimesh Kulasinghe	Kusala Vidanapathirana		
2022	Shakthi - TV Derana	Mama Mage Nowenam	Thilina Tharaka	Janaka Siriwardhana	Suneera Sumanga	
2022	Mathaka Siththam - Rupavahini (Note: Mathaka Siththam is the Sri Lankan dubbed version of the South Korean drama Saimdang) (Note: Nuwandhika provided backing vocals for the song Mathaka Nomiyewi)	Jeewithe Gatha Wela Yaddi	Lahiru Madivila	Aradhana Ekanayake		
2022	Mathaka Siththam - Rupavahini	Atheethaye Pem Kathawa	Lahiru Madivila	Aradhana Ekanayake	Chamara Fernando	
2022	Mathaka Siththam - Rupavahini	Diurumak Dennam	Lahiru Madivila	Aradhana Ekanayake	Chamara Fernando	
2022	Hithuwakkara - TV Derana	Mathaka Ime	Chathuranga De Silva	Yawwana Sameendra		
2021	Hithuwakkara - TV Derana	Puduma Hithuwakkaraya	Chathuranga De Silva	Gihan Chamika		
2021	Naadi ITN	Jeewithaye	Darshana Ruwan Dissanayake	Prasadini Senadheera	Darshana Ruwan Dissanayake	
2021	Deweni Inima - TV Derana	Malen Upan Samanali	Chathuranga De Silva, Nimesh Kulasinghe	Gihan Chamika	Raween Kanishka	
2021	Iskole - TV Derana	Sihinayak Mawna - Theme Song	Nimesh Kulasinghe	Shehan Galahitiyawa		
2020	Asanwara Wessak - ITN	Mala Hiru Basa Yana - Theme Song	Samantha Perera	Dr.Wijeyadasa Rajapakshe		
2018	Kiruli - Hiru TV	Kiruli - Theme Song	Milinda Thennakoon	Kasun Mahendra Heenatigala		

=== Radio drama songs ===
Year	Radio drama	Song	Composer(s)	Writer(s)	Co-singer(s)	Ref
2021	Apoorwa - FM Derana	Adareida Manda	Duleeka Kodagoda	Dilan Gamage	Duet With Falan Andrea	
2020	Apoorwa - FM Derana	Obata Lanvee - Theme song	Nimesh Kulasinghe	Saman Edirimunee	Duet With Raween Kanishka	
2016	Anuththara - Hiru FM	Sandata Duka Hithila	Thilina Ruhunage	Rachitha Wakista	Duet With Isuru Geekiyanage	

== Discography ==
Year	Title	Composer(s)	Writer(s)	Co-singer(s)
2023	Magey Hussma	Chathurangana De Silva	Sampath Fernandopulle	Hector Dias
2023	Ninde Eda Pasu Wu Nisa	Chandana Dasanayake	Thilakasena Basnayake	
2023	Nil Tharu Adana Dasa	Rohana Weerasinghe	Sunil Gamage	Chandika Vitharena
2022	Sande Wadinna	Navarathna Gamage	Jagath Rajesh	
2022	Puthuni Mage	AROH, Samantha Geekiyanage	Dr. Ruwani Nugara	
2022	Epa Numba Sanda Wenna	Aruna Gunawardana	Dr. Rajika Karunadasa	
2022	Koi Tharam Sene Unath	Visharada Samantha Perera	Hemamali Hapuarachchi	
2021	Datha Sudu Mahathwaruni	Dharshana Wickramathunga	Chandana Bandara Wanninayake	
2021	Sasara Maga	Dharshana Wickramathunga	Bandara Eheliyagoda	
2021	Abhiman Liya	Peshala Manoj	Chaturanga Rajapaksha	
2021	Kanda Ketiya	Waruna Gunathilake	Panduka Mahamithawa	
2021	Siduhath Oba Yanna	Aruna Gunawardana	Mahee Kolitha Ferdinando	
2021	Geeyak Gayanna	Upali Mendis	Anura Magalage	Keerthi Pasqual
2021	Ridunu Malak	Lahiru De Costa	Kumuduni Wickramathanthri	Gayashan Weerawansha
2021	Kahamal Iththak	Lahiru De Costa	Massane Vijitha Thero	
2021	Sansarini	Waruna Gunathilake	Tharindu Weerasinghe	Miyuru Somarathna
2021	Sathimath Daruwo	Sachee Maduranga	Indra Ariyarathne	
2021	Mal Tattoo	Sachee Maduranga	Roshani Gunawardana	
2020	Rosa Heena	Sachee Maduranga	Sachee Maduranga	
2020	Bindee Wisirunu	Darshana Wickramatunga	Lakmali Karunanayake	
2020	Wasanthaye	Lishan Bandara	Hansi Sandamali	Desika Kamalanjana
2020	Ma Rahasin (Note: Ma Rahasin was produced under a special offer made while she was contesting in the Top 5 round of Derana Dream Star Season IX)	Nimesh Kulasinghe	Shehan Galahitiyawa	
2019	Mathake Nubage	Amusync Entertainment	Reru	
2016	Rathriya Awadi Wee	Sam Wimaladharma	Chaminda Krishantha	
2016	Ape Atheethaya	H. M. Jayawardena	Manjula Senanayaka	
