= Deweni Inima =

Sri Lankan television series

- Title card
- Created by: Saman Edirimunee
- Developed by: Saranga Mendis
- Written by: Saman Edirimunee
- Directed by: Saranga Mendis
- Starring: Raween Kanishka; Keshan Shashindra; Himali Sayurangi
- Theme music composer: Nimesh Kulasinghe
- Opening theme: "Lanwela Wassanaye"
- Country of origin: Sri Lanka
- Original language: Sinhala
- No. of seasons: 2
- No. of episodes: 2373

Production
- Producer: Chamika Mendis
- Production location: Sri Lanka
- Running time: 20 Mins

Original release
- Network: TV Derana
- Release: 6 February 2017 – 4 June 2026

Deweni Inima (Sinhala: දෙවෙනි ඉනිම) is a 2017 Sinhalese Sri Lankan television prime-time soap opera which aired from 6 February 2017 to 4 June 2026 on TV Derana. The series is directed by Saranga Mendis, produced by Chamika Mendis and written by Saman Edirimunee. It aired every weekday from 8:30 p.m. to 9:00 p.m. It starred Raween Kanishka, Keshan Shashindra and Himali Sayurangi in lead roles.

The first season was aired from 6 February 2017 to 6 October 2023. The second season was aired from 9 October 2023 to 4 June 2026, finally showing Anuhas being lucky to marry his third partner after painful moments of his first love choosing monkhood and second one dying due to cancer. Season 2 ended on with a 1 hour special bonus episode marking the end of the teledrama after 9 years of production.

== Seasons ==
Season	Title	Episodes	Originally aired	
Season	Title	Episodes	First aired	Last aired
1	Deweni Inima	1681	6 February 2017	6 October 2023
2	Deweni Inima Season 2	692	9 October 2023	4 June 2026

== Plot ==
The main storyline is about life story of cricketer Anuhas Fernando. Awantha Fernando is his half brother. They both are the sons of well-known business man and former cricketer Ravi Fenando. Anuhas lives with his mother Udeni and runs a juice bar. They are very closely associated with Udeni's brother Ananda and his family, including his wife Anusha, elder son Dhanuka and younger daughter Dewmi.

Meanwhile Awantha is living with his father and spoilt mother Ameesha in a luxurious way. Ameesha always betrays Udeni and Anuhas and underestimates them. Awantha has a relationship with a fatherless child called Samalka, who was the daughter of a shareholder in Ravi's business. Her mother is in a mental hospital, which is a secret. Awantha is a notoriously rude spoilt student. Anuhas has two best friends, Mike and Chubby. Awantha always traps Anuhas on various matters to torture him which causes the two to fight. Coach Ekanayaka makes Anuhas captain of the school cricket team, making Awantha and Ameesha more enraged. Over time, Awantha tries to attract the attention of Dewmi, who is the cousin sister of Anuhas and a good friend of Samalka; their friendship develops after the singing competition. Over time Samalka is helped by Anuhas. Awantha and Dewmi secretly develop their relationship. Anuhas also builds a relationship with Samalka. Ravi Fernando dies from a heart attack in Australia. After finding out that Samalka was badly cheated by Mr. Samaranayaka, Samalka decides to become a Buddhist nun, leaving Lihini, the newcomer and best friend to live in a village alone. Lihini convinces Anuhas and they build a good relationship while Dewmi and Awantha's relationship faces many challenges because of family disputes.

Anuhas and Awantha are united after their father's death. Ameesha tries multiple times to separate them and fails. Meanwhile Dhanuka, Dewmi's brother, marries an employee in Ravi's business. The brothers are united and face many troubles caused by Menaka. Later, Dewmi and Awantha's relationship is accepted by both families; at the last moment they are separated by one of Menaka's tricks. Anuhas builds a relationship with Aksha, the younger sister of Samalka. Samalka's mother is treated and fully recovers.

Meanwhile, Udeni hands over the juice bar to Chubby and Mike, who run it well. Lihini's sister, Saheli comes to board with her to attend Colombo School like Lihini. Malinda, who was a great friend of Dewmi, builds a relationship with Saheli, Lihini's sister, which fails after Saheli moves to the village. Radeesh, who is Ameesha's brother's son, comes to Sri Lanka from Canada. He meets up with Lihini and starts a relationship which is highly accepted by Radeesh's father but not by spoilt mother and sister of Radeesh. Anuhas, Aksha and Awantha try to find who is tricking them and rebuild their business with the help of Radeesh, while Dewmi and Awantha try to strengthen their relationship and marry with their families' blessings. After a serious of events Dewmi and Avantha finally get there family's blessings and got married ending season 1 of Deweni Inima. Season 2 Of Deweni Inima started after the ending of season 1. In season 2 Aksha Succumbed to her Uterus Cancer. Leaving Anuhas depressed. Meanwhile Anuhas is selected to the SriLankan Nation Cricket Team.But he fails to win any matches. He was removed from the team for a short time for messing up the South Asia Cup Cricket match with Bangladesh. He gets introduced to a new character Samadhi and more

== Cast ==
=== Main cast ===
- Raween Kanishka as Anuhas Fernando
- Keshan Shashindra as Awantha Fernando
- Himali Sayurangi as Udeni
- Bimal Jayakody as Ravi Fernando
- Shanudrie Priyasad as Samalka
- Nayanathara Wickramarachchi as Dewmi
- Nethmi Roshel as Aaksha
- Thathsarani Piyumika as Samadhi
- Dharmapriya Dias as Ananda
- Palitha Silva as Coach Ekanayake

=== Supporting cast ===
- Sanath Gunathilake as Bhasuru (Guest Appearance)
- Rex Kodippili as Roney Fernando
- Anjula Rajapaksha as Ameesha
- Shalini Fernando as Lihini 1
- Upeka Ranasinghe as Lihini 2
- Vindya Lakshani as Lihini 3
- Ishara Madushan as Radeesh
- Anjalee Liyanage as Anusha
- Dev Surendra as Dhanuka
- Ishani Wijethunge as Aruni
- Denuwana Senadhi as Mike (Supun Sampath)
- Kanishka Prasad as Chubby (Dasun Chamara)
- Sahan Ranwala as Lawyer Neil Weheragala
- Sudath Anthony as Dilan
- Milinda Madugalle as Menaka
- Aruni Mendis as Nilu
- Tharushi Perera as Shanthi
- Chamal Dilsara as Roshan
- Oshan Soyza as Sahan
- Reginold Eroshon as Jegan
- Pasindu Prasad as Shehan
- Nishan Gamage as Bimal
- Malki Dissanayake as Aaranya
- Uresha Rajasekara as Bimal’s Wife
- Sameera Eeriyagama as Milan
- Richard Weerakkody as Loku Appa
- Nethalie Nanayakkara as Sanath's Mother
- Ishan Priyasanka as Sisira
- Kamal Deshapriya as Head Coach
- Anusha Samaranayake as Himself
- Ravindra Yasas as Sahan's Father
- Rangana Premaratne as Shehan's Father
- Ramani Siriwardhana as Roshan's Mother
- Medha Jayarathna as Shehan's Mother
- Somaweera Gamage as Lihini's Father
- Janaka Ranasinghe as Sanath
- Daya Wayaman as Raghavan
- Nilmini Kottegoda as Sahan's Mother
- Krishnan Hameesha Devi as Jegan's Sister
- Jeewan Handunneththi as Aaranya's Father
- Udaya Kumari as Aaranya's Mother
- Dineth Epaliyana as Malintha
- Randika Wijenayake as Mayura
- Maneesha Chanchala as Apeksha
- Buddhika Jayaratne as Deshan Silva
- Emasha Seneviratne as Saheli
- Jagath Apaladeniya as Lawyer Samaranayake
- Dilki Dissanayake as Pawani
- Thusitha Laknath as Rane
- Sarath kulanga as Karune
- Theekshana Manaram as Some
- Avishka Umayangi as Nethmi
- Chamara Bandaranayake as Ashoka
- Sangeetha Basnayake as Kanthi
- Chirantha Ranwala as Boys' School Principal
- Samanthi Lanarolle as the Girls' School Teacher
- Sachini Wickramasinghe as Mihiri
- Maneesha Namalgama as Malintha's Mother
- Dammika Aluthgedara as Ramanayake Sir
- Himaya Bandara as Sonali Teacher
- Laksith Randika as Sanjaya
- Sachin Chathuranga as Sandun
- Rangana Jayathilake as Sumane
- Prabath Chathuranga as Dhaneesha
- Nirukshan Ekanayake as Sheran
- Thrishala Nathashi as Madhuka
- Ryan Van Rooyen as Lionel Sandun
- Vidhushi Uththara as Malki
- Nilwala Wishwamali as Kalani
- Sudarshi Galanigama as the Girls' School Principal
- Thusitha Dhanushka as Mental Hospital Doctor
- Nimmi Priyadarshani as Buddhist Nun
- Duminda Danthanarayana as Police Inspector
- Wilmon Sirimanne as Dolagala Veda Mahattaya
- Hirushi Perera as Thameera
- Priyantha Wijekoon as Lasantha
- Boniface Jayasantha as Dharme

== Reception ==
The first episode of Deweni Inima was telecast on 6 February 2017 on TV Derana. It was telecast on weekdays at 8:30 p.m. Within a short time it became the most popular teledrama in Sri Lanka. Deweni Inima received the most popular teledrama award in Raigam Tele'es, Sumathi Awards and SLIM-Nielsen Peoples Awards several times. According to LMRB ratings, Deweni Inima is the most-watched television programme among all categories in Sri Lanka. The 1000th episode of Deweni Inima was telecast on 5 February 2021.

The first season of deweni inima ended on 6 October 2023 after 1681 episodes. The second season started from 9 October 2023 and ended on 4 June 2026 after 692 episodes.

Deweni inima is the longest Sri Lankan television series of all time with 2373 episodes and 55 songs.

== Awards ==
Year	Award	Category	Recipient	Result
2017	Raigam Tele'es	Most Popular Teledrama	Deweni Inima	Won
2017	Raigam Tele'es	Most Popular Actress	Nayanathara Wickramaarachchi	Won
2017	Sumathi Awards	Most Popular Teledrama	Deweni Inima	Won
2017	Sumathi Awards	Most Popular Actress	Nayanathara Wickramaarachchi	Won
2018	SLIM Nielson People's Award	Most Popular Actress	Nayanathara Wickramaarachchi	Won
2018	SLIM Nielson People's Award	Most Popular Actress	Shanudrie Priyasad	Won
2018	Raigam Tele'es	Most Popular Actress	Nayanathara Wickramaarachchi	Won
2018	Sumathi Awards	Most Popular Actor	Raween Kanishka	Won
2019	SLIM Nielson People's Award	Most Popular Teledrama	Deweni Inima	Won
2019	SLIM Nielson People's Award	Most Popular Actress	Nayanathara Wickramaarachchi	Won
2019	Raigam Tele'es	Most Popular Actor	Raween Kanishka	Won
2019	Raigam Tele'es	Most Popular Actress	Nayanathara Wickramaaarachchi	Won
2020	SLIM Nielson People's Award	Most Popular Teledrama	Deweni Inima	Won
2020	SLIM Nielson People's Award	Most Popular Actor	Raween Kanishka	Won
2020	SLIM Nielson People's Award	Most Popular Actress	Nayanathara Wickramaarachchi	Won
2020	Raigam Tele'es	Most Popular Actor	Raween Kanishka	Won
2021	SLIM Nielson People's Award	Most Popular Teledrama	Deweni Inima	Won
2021	SLIM Nielson People's Award	Most Popular Actor	Raween Kanishka	Won
2021	SLIM Nielson People's Award	Most Popular Actress	Nayanathara Wickramaarachchi	Won
2022	SLIM Kantar People's Award	Most Popular Actress	Nayanathara Wickramaarachchi	Won
2023	SLIM Kantar People's Award	Most Popular Actor	Raween Kanishka	Won
2024	SLIM Kantar People's Award	Most Popular Teledrama	Deweni Inima	Won
2024	SLIM Kantar People's Award	Most Popular Actor	Raween Kanishka	Won

== Soundtrack ==
Song	Singer	Lyrics	Music	Length
"Lanwela Wassanaye"	Yashodha Priyadharshani	Saman Edirimunee	Nimesh Kulasinghe	2:51
"Nidi Nena"	Kalpana Kavindi	Shehan Galahitiyawa	Nimesh Kulasinghe	3:58
"Supem Wee"	Upeka Nirmani	Shehan Galahitiyawa	Nimesh Kulasinghe	3:30
"Sanda Nidanna"	Raween Kanishka	Gihan Chamika	Ranjith Premaveera	3:49
"Maga Nodana (Ingi Bigi Sena)"	Raween Kanishka, Kanishka Prasad, Kalpana Kavindi, Viraj Bathiya, Upeka Nirmani	Shehan Galahitiyawa	Nimesh Kulasinghe	3:47
"Galayana Gange"	Raween Kanishka	Shehan Galahitiyawa	Nimesh Kulasinghe	4:10
"Me Gewana Aruma Diwiya"	Raween Kanishka, Keshan Shashindra	Shehan Galahitiyawa	Nimesh Kulasinghe	3:49
"Hamadama Oya Daasa"	Keshan Shashindra, Kalpana Kavindi	Saman Edirimunee	Nimesh Kulasinghe	3:57
"Bambarek Awilla"	Upeka Nirmani	Nandana Wickramage	Romesh Sugathapala	4:11
"Sanda Manaliye"	Keshan Shashindra	Tharinda Kasun Jayawardena	Ranjith Premaveera	4:11
"Nethu Yuga Vihida"	Lavan Abhishek, Naveen Dilshan, Anura Priyakalum, Nilupul Bandara, Sithum Nimantha, Sachini Ranawaka	Shehan Galahitiyawa	Nimesh Kulasinghe	3:50
"Ada Nam Ma Hada"	Raween Kanishka, Kalpana Kavindi	Shehan Galahitiyawa	Nimesh Kulasinghe	4:16
"Sarigama Ragathala"	Anura Priyakalum, Nilupul Bandara, Sithum Nimantha	Shehan Galahitiyawa	Nimesh Kulasinghe	3:21
"Kalambee Hamana"	Nimanthi Chamodani	Shehan Galahitiyawa	Nimesh Kulasinghe	3:32
"Ninde Gambure Asha Mawa"	Mahesha Sandamali	Shehan Galahitiyawa	Nimesh Kulasinghe	3:49
"Mama Ohomai Hamadamath"	Suneera Sumanga	Janaka Siriwardhana	Aruna Gunawardana	3:43
"Ape Adare Kathawa"	Keshan Shashindra, Kalpana Kavindi	Tharinda Kasun Jayawardena	Nimesh Kulasinghe	3:27
"Me As Nidi Na Hoyanne"	Kalpana Kavindi	Gihan Chamika	Ranjith Premaveera	3:18
"Sanda Kemi"	Sandeep Jayalath	Shehan Galahitiyawa	Nimesh Kulasinghe	4:01
"Supipila Nil Vil Thalawe"	Raween Kanishka	Shehan Galahitiyawa	Ranjith Premaveera	3:54
"Rathriye Pipennam"	Keshan Shashindra	Upul Shantha Sannasgala	Mahesh Denipitiya	2:53
"Jeewithe Widinnam"	Kalpana Kavindi	Shehan Galahitiyawa	Mahesh Denipitiya	3:24
"Malen Upan Samanali"	Raween Kanishka, Nuwandhika Senarathne	Gihan Chamika	Nimesh Kulasinghe, Chathurangana de Silva	3:15
"Rosa Kathandara"	Nimanthi Chamodani	Gihan Chamika	Dulaj Dhanushka	3:26
"Sikuru Hathata"	Raween Kanishka, Keshan Shashindra, Lavan Abhishek, Nilupul Bandara, Naveen Dilshan, Anura Priyakalum, Sumeda Lakmal	Shehan Galahitiyawa	Nimesh Kulasinghe	3:07
"Rasa Mawala"	Kalpana Kavindi, Kamani Lasanthika, Nimanthi Chamodani, Sithara Madushani	Shehan Galahitiyawa	Nimesh Kulasinghe	3:30
"Gamen Malak"	MG Dhanushka, Nimanthi Chamodani	Gihan Chamika	Nimesh Kulasinghe, Chathurangana de Silva	3:16
"Heena Rayak"	Rajitha Banuka, Isindi Amarasinghe	Gihan Chamika	Chathurangana de Silva	4:21
"Nilwarna"	Keshan Shashindra	Gihan Chamika	Nimesh Kulasinghe	3:30
"Hip Hop Baila Raga"	Raween Kanishka, Sithara Madushani, Poorna Sachintha, Isindi Amarasinghe, Nisal Sathsara, Sashrika Semini, Wenusara Vindana	Shehan Galahitiyawa	Chathurangana de Silva	3:10
"Mata Kiya Denna"	Raween Kanishka	Narada Wijesuriya	Nawarathne Gamage	4:37
"Oba Innakal Dasa Mane"	Raween Kanishka	Amila Ruwan Nandasena	Nimesh Kulasinghe	3:51
"Sithe Pipunu"	Raween Kanishka	Shehan Galahitiyawa	Ranjith Premaveera	4:00
"Meedum Yaye"	Pramoth Ganearachchi	Shehan Galahitiyawa	Ranjith Premaveera	4:04
"Daiwa Saradama"	Raween Kanishka	Shehan Galahitiyawa	Nimesh Kulasinghe	3:47
"Gassana Nariyan"	Hirusha Fernando, Upeka Rukshan, Malith Silva, Angelo Gamage, Sandun Amarasinghe	Shehan Galahitiyawa	Chathurangana De Silva	3:07
"Bambaru Adethi"	Hirusha Fernando, Upeka Rukshan, Malith Silva, Angelo Gamage, Sandun Amarasinghe	Shehan Galahitiyawa	Chathurangana De Silva	3:07
"Suramya Warshawan"	Hirusha Fernando, Angelo Gamage, Achinthya Wijesinghe, Malith Silva, Sanali Lihansa, Shanika Prabodhani	Shehan Galahitiyawa	Chathurangana De Silva	2:45
"Sanda Wan Sinawan"	Hirusha Fernando, Angelo Gamage, Achinthya Wijesinghe	Shehan Galahitiyawa	Chathurangana De Silva	2:36
"Pongalo Pongal"	Kandappu Jayaroopan	Pottuvil Asmin	Chathurangana De Silva	3:20
"Walawe"	Apoorwa Ashawari	Shehan Galahitiyawa	Ranjith Premaveera	3:56
"Adalama Na"	Sithum Nimantha, Angelo Gamage, Malith Silva, Avishka Perera, Sandun Amarasinghe, Upeka Rukshan, Milindu Shehan	Gihan C Rodrigo	Chathurangana De Silva	2:56
"Awasanaya Dakwa"	Ravi Royster	Shehan Galahitiyawa	Shakila Dilshan	4:17
"As Mayamkari"	Lavan Abhishek	Gihan C Rodrigo	Chathurangana De Silva	3:07
"Aradhana Oya Dasin"	Raween Kanishka	Amila Ruwan Nandasena	Ranjith Premaveera, Chathurangana De Silva	4:05
"Dosi Wade"	Raween Kanishka	Shehan Galahitiyawa	Chathurangana De Silva	3:30
"Iranam Kathandare"	Raween Kanishka	Gihan C Rodrigo	Ranjith Premaveera, Nimesh Kulasinghe	3:51
"Adarayee Seenu Handin"	Pramoth Ganearachchi, Sithum Nimantha, Aksha Chamudi	Sampath Fernandopulle	Chathurangana De Silva	3:00
"Naththal Seeya"	Pramoth Ganearachchi, Sithum Nimantha, Aksha Chamudi	Sampath Fernandopulle	Chathurangana De Silva	2:35
"Mandodari"	Hirusha Fernando	Gihan C Rodrigo	Chathurangana De Silva	3:24
"Auruddata Aluth Pathum"	Samitha Mudunkotuwa	Saman Edirimunee	Chathurangana De Silva	3:29
"Dase Mal Wassaki"	Lavan Abhishek, Sachini Ranawaka, Anura Priyakelum, Sithum Nimantha	Kusala Vidanapathirana	Rivikal Methsandu	3:15
"Sinawe Kathawe"	Raween Kanishka, Apoorwa Ashawaree	Shehan Galahitiyawa	Ranjith Premaweera	3:54
"Adare Kiya Kiyanne"	Raween Kanishka	Sampath Fernandopulle	Nimesh Kulasinghe	3:40
"Loke Karakewi Machan"	Ayesha Jayalath, Sewmini Sanjana, Thenuka Waragoda	Shehan Galahitiyawa	Nimesh Kulasinghe	3:15

== Crossover ==
On 16 August 2019, 11 November 2021 and 6 October 2023, Deweni Inima had crossovers with Sangeethe, where Mahee's music band attended Dhanuka and Aruni's wedding, a boys' school get together, and Awantha and Dewmi's wedding. They performed in those three events.

On 12 April 2024, Deweni Inima had a crossover with Sangeethe and Iskole, where Anuhas and his friends participated friendly cricket match in Randika's Village. After that cricket match Mahee's music band held a musical show.

On 25 December 2024, Deweni Inima had a crossover with Sangeethe where Mahee's music band attended a Christmas Party organized by Anuhas, Samadhi and their friends.

On 14 April 2025, Deweni Inima had a crossover with Sangeethe and Iskole, where Anuhas and his friends participated New Year Festival in Randika's Village. After that festival Mahee's music band held a musical show.

== See also ==
- TV Derana
