= Raween Kanishka =

Sri Lankan actor, singer and presenter

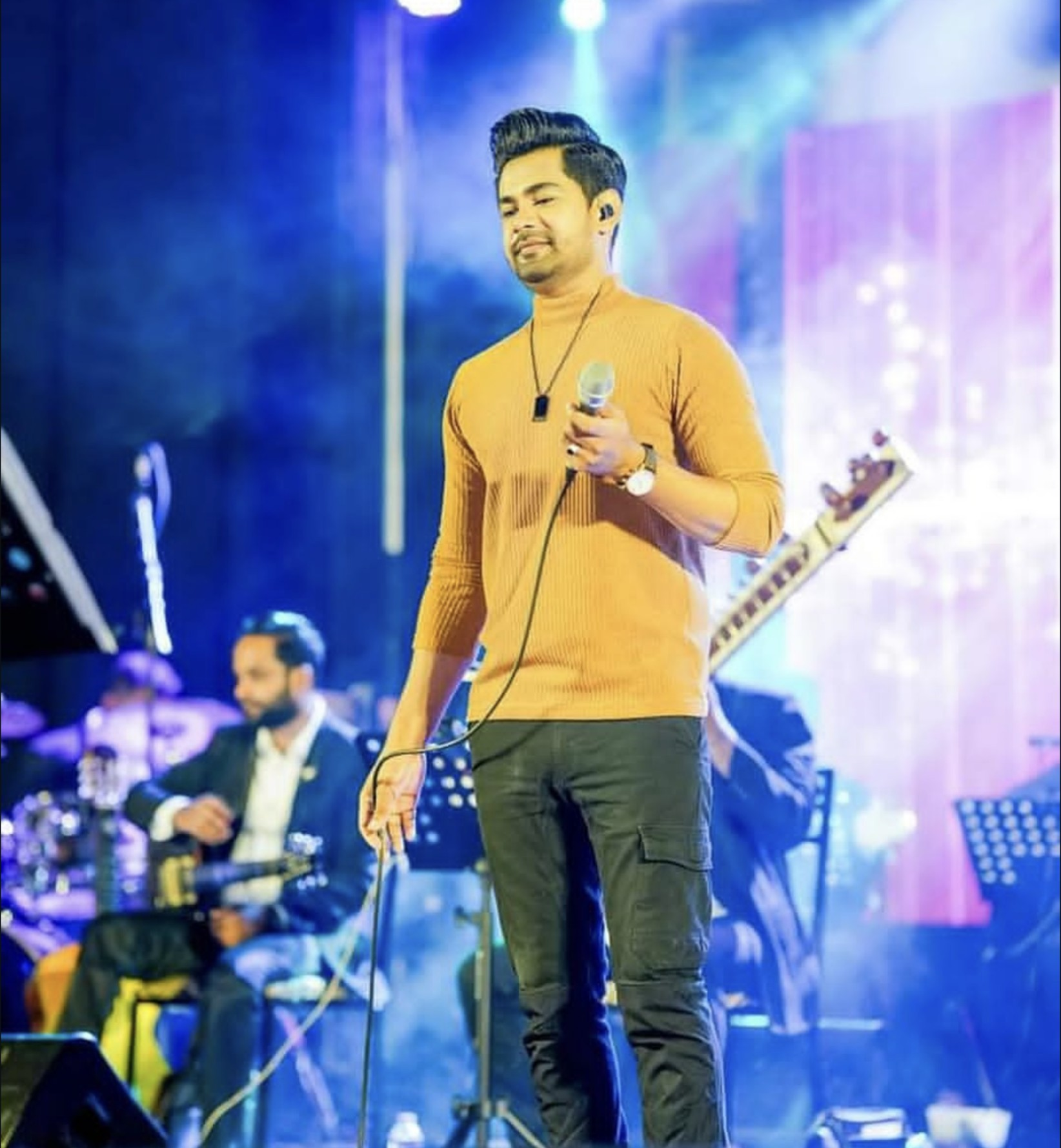
- Raween Kanishka at Miyuru Kalpana show 2024
- Born: August 15, 1991 (age 35); Kuliyapitiya, Sri Lanka
- Education: Kuliyapitiya Central College
- Occupations: Singer; Actor; Television Presenter; Dancer
- Years active: 2012–present

Raween Kanishka (born 15 August 1991) is a Sri Lankan singer, actor, dancer, and presenter. He first rose to national prominence as the first runner-up in the fourth season of the reality competition Derana Dream Star in 2012. He gained widespread fame with his role as "Anuhas" in the television series Deweni Inima, which also earned him the most popular teledrama actor award in several award ceremonies.

== Early life and education ==
Raween was born in Kuliyapitiya. He attended Kuliyapitiya Central College, where he was actively involved in music and school stage productions before entering the national entertainment industry.

== Career ==
=== Music and presenting ===
Raween's career began in 2012 with his success on Derana Dream Star. He has since released numerous hit singles and is a frequent collaborator on major teledrama soundtracks. He also established himself as a high-profile television presenter, hosting programs such as Derana Dream Star (Season 9 onwards) and several major award ceremonies including the Raigam Tele'es.

Following his initial success on reality television, Raween returned to compete in the celebrity reality competition Derana Star City, where he won first place in both Season 1 and Season 2. He also began his early career in media as a radio presenter before transitioning to television hosting.

Beyond his studio releases and teledrama soundtracks, Raween has established himself as one of the most highly sought-after live performers in the Sri Lankan entertainment industry. He is a regular featured vocalist on premier television musical broadcasts and weekend entertainment programs, with notable appearances on shows such as Sparsha (TV Derana) and Mathra (Swarnavahini). Additionally, his widespread popularity has led him to headline major indoor and outdoor concerts across the island, as well as participate in numerous international musical tours performing for Sri Lankan diaspora communities worldwide.

=== Acting ===
Raween made his television acting debut in 2017 with the role of "Anuhas" in Deweni Inima. In the early seasons, his on-screen chemistry with co-star Shanudrie Priyasad, who played Samalka, gained massive popularity, fans affectionately dubbed the couple "Sanuhas" (a portmanteau of Samalka and Anuhas) and helped establish the show's massive fanbase.

Following her character's departure, his subsequent on-screen pairing with Nethmi Roshel Rogers (playing Aksha) became equally celebrated by Sri Lankan audiences. Fans affectionately dubbed the couple "Anuksha" (a portmanteau of Anuhas and Aksha). This highly celebrated on-screen chemistry contributed significantly to the continued success of the series and its accompanying music videos, with tracks like "Malen Upan Samanalee" garnering over 23 million views on YouTube.

His massive television popularity led to leading roles in digital web series on the CeyFliX platform, including the romance dramas Kiss and We. In 2022, Raween took on a lead role in the TV Derana drama Diyani.

In cinema, Raween made his debut in the 2023 film Ksheera Sagaraya Kalabina" playing the role of Hirimala. The film was directed by Professor Sunil Ariyaratne.. In 2024, he starred in the musical film Solo Town, portraying the character Asanjaya (Jay).

Outside of his acting and music career, Kanishka has also served as a brand ambassador for Oppo in Sri Lanka, promoting their Reno2 F smartphone series.

== Filmography ==
=== Television and web series ===
Year	Title	Role	Network/Platform	Notes
2012	Derana Dream Star (Season 4)	Contestant	TV Derana	First Runner-up
2013	Derana Star Challenge Season 2	Member of Bachi's Warriors	TV Derana	First group competition
2016	Derana Star City Season 1	Member of Super Gangsters	TV Derana	Winner
2017	Derana Star City Season 2	Member of Royal Fighters	TV Derana	Winner
2017–2026	Deweni Inima	Anuhas Fernando	TV Derana	Lead Role (Seasons 1 & 2)
2020-2021	Kiss	Ishira	CeyFliX	Web Series (Seasons 1 & 2)
2022	We	Varun	CeyFliX	Web Series (Seasons 1 & 2)
2022	Diyani	Santhush	TV Derana	Lead Role
2021–2022	Derana Dream Star (Seasons 9 & 10)	Presenter	TV Derana	Presenter in both seasons
2026	Hathweni Manali	Dev Sooriyasinghe	TV Derana	Lead Role

=== Film ===
Year	Title	Role	Director	Notes
2023	Ksheera Sagaraya Kalabina	Hirimala	Sunil Ariyaratne	Debut film
2024	Solo Town	Asanjaya (Jay)	Chathurangana de Silva	Lead role
2026	Kalpana	Piyavi	Saranga Mendis	Lead role
TBA	Ima	Raween	Charith Abeysingha	Lead Role
TBA	Kala Handa	John Jayapala	Sunil Ariyaratne	Lead Role
TBA	Warsha		Mohan Niyaz	Lead Role

== Discography ==
This is a selected list of Raween Kanishka's most notable soundtrack contributions and independent releases. He has recorded and performed numerous other tracks throughout his career.

=== Soundtrack contributions ===
Year	Song	Project	Notes
2017	"Sanda Nidanna"	Deweni Inima	
2018	"Gala Yana Gange"	Deweni Inima	
2020	"Ada Nam Ma Hada"	Deweni Inima	ft. Kalpana Kavindi
2020	"Namak Nathi"	Kiss Web Series Theme Song	ft. Shanudrie Priyasad
2023	"Malen Upan Samanalee"	Deweni Inima	ft. Nuwandhika Senarathne (Over 23 Million views)
2024	"Adaraye Mul Dawas"	Solo Town	Film Song
2026	"Adare Kiya Kiyanne Jeewithetamai"	Deweni Inima	Season 2 Theme

=== Independent singles ===
Year	Song	Notes
2014	"Kada Halena Tharuwak"	
2017	"Sandawan Ruwin"	Breakout single
2018	"Visiri Thibuna"	
2019	"Matath Unna Kenek Issara"	
2022	"Danune"	
2022	"Meghana"	
2025	"Numbage Wela"	

== Awards and accolades ==
Raween won many awards for his television acting and singing, and some of them are:

Year	Award Ceremony	Category	Nominated Work	Result
2017	State Music Awards	Best Singer		Nominated
2018	Sumathi Awards	Most Popular Actor	Deweni Inima	Won
2019	3CS Tele Film Festival Australia	Most Popular Actor	Deweni Inima	Won
2019	Raigam Tele'es	Most Popular Actor	Deweni Inima	Won
2020	Raigam Tele'es	Most Popular Actor	Deweni Inima	Won
2020	SLIM-Nielsen Peoples Awards	Most Popular Actor	Deweni Inima	Won
2021	SLIM-Nielsen Peoples Awards	Most Popular Actor	Deweni Inima	Won
2023	SLIM-Kantar Peoples Awards	Most Popular Teledrama Actor	Deweni Inima	Won
2024	SLIM-Kantar Peoples Awards	Most Popular Teledrama Actor	Deweni Inima	Won
