= Sangeethe =

Sri Lankan television series

- Sangeethe title card
- Sinhala: සංගීතේ
- Genre: Comedy drama Thriller Romantic
- Created by: Saman Edirimunee
- Developed by: Mayura Kariyawasam
- Written by: Saman Edirimunee
- Directed by: Mayura Kariyawasam
- Starring: Lavan Abhishek; Sayuri Wijesooriya; Pramoth Ganearachchi; Sriyantha Mendis; Douglas Ranasinghe
- Theme music composer: Nimesh Kulasinghe
- Opening theme: "Nawathinne na baya danne na"
- Country of origin: Sri Lanka
- Original language: Sinhala
- No. of seasons: 2
- No. of episodes: 1415 (Season 1)

Production
- Producer: Dammika Aluthgedara
- Production location: Sri Lanka
- Running time: 20 Mins

Original release
- Network: TV Derana
- Release: 11 February 2019 – present

Sangeethe (Sinhala: සංගීතේ) is a 2019 Sri Lankan television prime-time soap opera which premiered on 11 February 2019 on TV Derana. The series is directed by Mayura Kariyawasam, produced by Dammika Aluthgedara and written by Saman Edirimunee. It airs every weekday from 8:00 pm to 8:30 pm onwards. The first season was premiered on 11 February 2019 and ended on 27 September 2024. The second season was premiered on 30 September 2024 and still going on. Sometimes it broadcasts for an hour due to special season episodes. Lavan Abhishek, Sayuri Wijesooriya, Pramoth Ganearachchi, Sriyantha Mendis and Douglas Ranasinghe are performing the leading roles.

== Plot ==
Mahee belongs to a middle-class family and is a bandleader of his musical band which he forms with his friends, and Aseni is a golden-hearted daughter of a rich, evil-hearted businessman who thinks everything is money. Despite being able to have good life, Aseni always wanted to be simple, so she often walks or takes public transport to school. With her bubbly personality, as a final year high schooler, Aseni manages to be friends with Mahee's younger brother, "Malitha", and they soon turned out to be best friends who would always end up teasing each other. Aseni was also loved by Mahee's elder sister, "Nishani", who was teaching in the same school, however Mahee doesn't seem to like Aseni much and thinks of Aseni to be evil as her brothers. Aseni being the bubbly girl she is, often tries her best to be-friend Mahee, who always goes by her school in his motorcycle. Mahee soon realizes that Aseni is a kind hearted girl and is extremely righteous unlike her corrupt family.

Once as Mahee was passing by, he helps Aseni's grandfather who was sick and laying down on the road helplessly, Aseni then expresses her gratitude to Mahee who helped her sick grandfather, who seems to be the only person in her family who truly cares about her. It is said that Aseni's parents dropped Aseni's grandfather to an elderly home when she was young, from that day on Aseni frequently used to visit her grandfather in the elderly home. With days passing by, Mahee befriends Aseni, and they started to develop a blossoming friendship which soon turned into having feelings for each other, but as both of their families were considered rivals, neither of them confessed their feelings to each other. Mahi and his band also gets gigs along the way, which makes his rival, "Kalana", Aseni's elder brother, who is also the leader of an opposing music band, to deepen his hatred for Mahee. Soon Aseni starts visiting Mahee's home frequently and bonded with Mahee's family. It didn't take much longer for Aseni's family to realize the friendship between Aseni, Malitha (Mahee's younger brother) and Mahee. Despite being threatened and beaten up, Mahee and Aseni's bond became grew intimate, and they soon both end up confessing to each other after falling in love with each other. However, Mahee's family who loved Aseni as if she was of their own family, accepted her as Mahee's girlfriend.

But Aseni's family who was rude enough ends up insulting Mahee's family and threatening them in various ways. Aseni and Mahee's love story even when faced with hard times they remained strong. With no other solution Aseni's father, "Asela", fixed Aseni's engagement to Kalpana who was a son of a corrupted politician also known as a playboy and a corrupted politician himself too. Even when Kalpana proposed to Aseni, she rejected him as she is in love with Mahee, but an enraged Kalpana tries to kill Mahee but ends up failing. Seeing this, Aseni's family forced her to get into a relationship with Kalpana, Aseni begins to hate Kalpana due to his cheap work, Kalpana too hates her but keeps acting as if he loves her, in order to take revenge from her for rejecting and ignoring him. Even with all these problems thrown at Aseni and Mahee, they remained strong and did not let others get in the way of their relationship.

Later Aseni was killed by Kalpana's Gangsters and after that Mahee leave the village and went to another village to forgot Aseni's memories. He work as a Farm Manager in that village and start seeking Aseni's Murderers Secretly. He gets introduced to a new character Dihansa and more...

== Cast and characters ==
=== Main cast ===
- Lavan Abhishek as Mahee
- Sayuri Wijesooriya as Dihansa
- Pramoth Ganearachchi as Kalana
- Sriyantha Mendis as Asela Morawaka
- Douglas Ranasinghe as Sarath Morawaka

=== Supporting cast ===
- Kumudu Nishantha as Milinda
- Prabath Chathuranga as Ranjan
- Subanya Gamage as Senuri
- Indika Subasinghe as Semini
- Menuka Premarathna as Minister Suranjith
- Rukshanthi Perera as Mali
- Asanjaya Weerasinghe as Lamba (Kasun Lambert)
- Sanjaya Muramudali as Thisanka
- Apoorwa Ashawari as Ishani
- Shashiranga Wickramasekara as Damith
- Denuwana Senadhi as Kalos
- Pasindu Prasad as Naveesh
- Pavithra Wickramasinghe as Dihansa's Mother
- Sachini Ranawaka as Amaya
- Anura Priyakelum as Pola
- Shanaka Udeesha as Rocky
- Nilupul Bandara as Dasun
- Sithum Nimantha as Sunil
- Tharindu Pradeep as Nayana
- Kelum Devanarayana as Malitha
- Aksha Chamudi as Mahee's Niece
- Shiny Netthikumara as Sakuni
- Jayasekara Aponsu as Nayana's Father
- Hansamala Janaki as Nayana’s mother

== Reception ==
The review aggregator website IMDb reported an approval rating of 1 star out of 10, based on 989 reviews. Most viewers might criticize the TV show "Sangeethe" for being overly dramatic and lacking depth in its characters. The plotlines are often repetitive and predictable, making it feel like a recycled version of many other soap operas. Additionally, the acting can come across as forced, and the dialogues sometimes lack authenticity. Overall, it could be seen as a missed opportunity to provide a more engaging and nuanced story.

== See also ==
- Deweni Inima
