= Sachini =

Sachini (Sinhala: සචිනි) is a Sinhalese feminine given name that may refer to the following notable people:

- Sachini Ayendra Stanley, Sri Lankan film actress
- Sachini Nipunsala (born 1992), Sri Lankam television presenter
- Sachini Ranasinghe (born 1994), Sri Lankan chess player
