= Kabaddi (disambiguation) =

Kabaddi is an Indian contact team sport.

Kabaddi may also refer to:

- Punjabi kabaddi, or circle style kabaddi
- Kabaddi (2009 film), an Indian film
- Kabaddi (2014 film), a Nepali film
- Kabaddi (2021 film), a Sri Lankan sports action film

== See also ==
- Abadi language, of Papua New Guinea, also known as Kabadi
- Kabaddi Kabaddi (disambiguation)
