= Madhava Wijesinghe =

Sri Lankan actor and television presenter

Madhava Wijesinghe මාධව විජේසිංහ
- Born: Wijesinghe Pathirage Harindra Madhava Wijesinghe; June 18, 1988 (age 38); Sri Jayewardenepura, Sri Lanka
- Education: Maharagama Dharmasoka College; Lumbini College
- Alma mater: University of Sri Jayewardenepura
- Occupations: Actor; director; TV host; producer
- Years active: 1993–present
- Spouse: Nanduni Ranasinghe (m. 2020)
- Parents: Padmasena Perera (father); Malkanthi Kahandawa (mother)

Wijesinghe Pathirage Harindra Madhava Wijesinghe (born 18 June 1988, Sinhala: මාධව විජේසිංහ) [Sinhala]), popularly known as Madhava Wijesinghe, is an actor in Sri Lankan cinema, theater and television as well as a television presenter. Started as a child artist, Wijesinghe became one of the popular television presenters in Sri Lanka by hosting the reality show Derana Little Star and musical chat program Champions Stars.

== Personal life ==
He was born on 18 June 1988 in Sri Jayewardenepura, Colombo, Sri Lanka as the second child of the family. His father Wijesinghe Pathirage Padmasena Perera, is a Deputy general manager of State Mortgage and Investment Bank. His mother Kahandawa Appuhamillage Malkanthi Kahandawa is a state employee. He has one brother, Gayan Wijesinghe who is an assistant accountant. He completed his primary education in Maharagama Dharmashoka College, and entered Lumbini College for secondary education.

In 2011, Wijesinghe obtained the Diploma in Writer-ship and Communication by The Department of Sinhala and Mass Communication, in the Faculty of Humanities and Social Sciences in the University of Sri Jayewardenepura. Then he completed a Diploma in Television Program Production Techniques and Video Technology at the National Youth Services Council, Maharagama.

He is married to Nanduni Ranasinghe where the wedding was celebrated on 26 October 2020. A graduate from Tianjin Medical University, China, Nanduni hails from an artistic family where veteran actor Douglas Ranasinghe is her paternal uncle, and popular radio personality Thileka Ranasinghe, is her paternal aunt. Popular actor Saranga Disasekara is her cousin brother and actress Dinakshie Priyasad is her sister-in-law.

== Career ==
In 1993 at the age of five, Wijesinghe made his debut acting role in the critically acclaimed movie Chanda Kinnari directed by Asoka Handagama which was later screened in 1998. In the film, he played the 'youngest son' of the lead actress Swarna Mallawarachchi and lead actor Hemasiri Liyanage.

While being active in State Children's Drama Festival, he hosted student programs on the Independent Television Channel and Sirasa TV and appeared in many commercials. The lead role played at the State Drama Festival landed him with a merit certificate. Then he played the lead role in an award-winning play produced by Gayathri Heenatigama for State Drama Festival.

In 2005, Wijesinghe joined TV Derana as a presenter and He presented of the children's reality show Little Star along with Sachini Nipunsala. The duo then presented all 10 seasons of the reality show. In addition he currently works as the co-presenter of the musical chat program Derana Champions Stars Unlimited along with Nipunsala and Peshala Manoj. In 2009, he played lead role of 'Kasun', along with Dinakshie Priyasad in the television series Wassana Sihinaya directed by Janaka Siriwardana. The serial was based on a novel written by Upul Shantha Sannasgala.

In 2011, he played the role of 'Anuhas' in the television serial Thurya. The serial became the turning point in his acting career. In 2013, he acted in the serial Hima Kandu with a supportive role. Then in 2014, he appeared in the television serial Rana In the same year, he joined with the cast of soap opera Sujatha where he played the role of 'Shakya'. In the meantime, he made comeback in the cinema with the biographical film Anagarika Dharmapala Srimathano directed by Sanath Abeysekara.

In 2015, he performed in the stage play Nattukkari produced by Namel Weeramuni. The in 2016, he starred in two television serials Package and Warna. The in 2017, he played the role 'Vihanga' in the soap opera Salsapuna. In 2018, Wijesinghe played the role of 'Tharindu' the serial Sanda Pini Wessa. The in 2019, he appeared in the serial Thodu with another supportive role. In the same year, she acted in the serial Neela Pabalu.

In addition to acting, he is a popular figure in music videos where he appeared in more than 50 music videos for several singers such as T. M. Jayaratne, Roshan Fernando, Prasanga Thisera, Raween Kanishka, Laksman Wijesekara and Ruwan Fernando. Meanwhile, he founded the production company, 'INNOV 8 Sri Lanka' which produces television shows, music videos and commercials.

== Television serials ==
Year	Film	Role	Ref.
2009	Wassana Sihinaya	Kasun	
2011	Thurya	Anuhas	
2013	Hima Kandu	Ryan	
2014	Rana	Son	
2014	Sujatha	Shakya	
2015	Muhunu Potha	Sithum	
2016	Package	Pasan	
2016	Warna	Pawan	
2017	Salsapuna	Vihanga	
2017	Sikurulanthe	Malinga	
2017	Nisala Sanda Oba		
2018	Sanda Pini Wessa	Tharindu	
2019	Thodu	Keshan	
2019	Neela Pabalu	Adithya	
2026	Ehew Hithaka Adarayak	Mahi	

== Filmography ==
Year	Film	Role	Ref.
1993	Chanda Kinnari	Youngest son	
2014	Anagarika Dharmapala Srimathano	Reporter	
