= Sachini Nipunsala =

Sri Lankan TV presenter and dancer

Sachini Nipunsala සචිනි නිපුන්සලා
- Born: Hewakalu Ambalage Sachini Nipunsala; 7 November 1992 (age 33); Boralesgamuwa, Sri Lanka
- Education: Vidayakara Vidyalaya; Visakha Vidyalaya
- Alma mater: University of Sri Jayawardenepura
- Occupations: Dancer; TV host
- Years active: 2006–present
- Spouse: Isuru Randeniya (m. 2020)

Hewakalu Ambalage Sachini Nipunsala (Sinhala: සචිනි නිපුන්සලා; born 7 November 1992), popularly known as Sachini Nipunsala, is a Sri Lankan television presenter and dancer. Started as a child artist, Nipunsala became a popular television presenter in Sri Lanka by hosting the reality show Derana Little Star and musical chat program Champions Stars.

== Personal life ==
She was born on 7 November 1992 in Boralesgamuwa, Sri Lanka as the only child of the family. Her father Ajith Lionel is a businessman and her mother Shyamalee Pieris is a housewife. She studied at Vidayakara Balika Vidyalaya, Maharagama from 1998 to 2008 until O/L. She was an active member of the school's drama and art circles as well as the announcer at many school events. In 2009, she attended Visakha Vidyalaya, Colombo 05 and completed A/L in 2011. In 2016, she graduated with B.Sc. Hons. Special degree (First Class) in Marketing Management at University of Sri Jayawardenepura.

She is married to Isuru Shanaka Randeniya, and the wedding was celebrated on 13 March 2020. Isuru is a business analyst.

== Career ==
She has been a part of many children's programs on several television channels including Hapan Padura, Athuru Mithuru, Punchi Panchi as a Ransith Yaya as a backup. Since 2006, she started a professional career as a television presenter at TV Derana. Then she hosted many children's programs such as Amuthu Muthu, Lassana Ahasa and Ammai Mamai on TV Derana.

She then worked as the regular presenter of the reality show Derana Little Star season 2 along with Madhava Wijesinghe. The duo then presented all 10 seasons of the reality show until 2020. Meanwhile, she has been the co-presenter of the musical chat program Derana Champions Stars Unlimited along with Wijesinghe and Peshala Manoj since 2014.

Other than those popular television shows, she hosted the bridal show Vivaha from 2016 to 2017. She also got the opportunity to be the Red carpet Host for Derana Film Awards, Derana Dream Star, and Derana City of Dance for many seasons. She also worked as a host of Sumathi Awards for 4 years.

Apart from being a popular television presenter, she is also a prolific dancer who is considered amongst the country's finest. In 2017, she started off with a Dance cover for the song Visekari which has received over 3 million views on YouTube. With this popularity, she started a YouTube channel specified in Dance Covers including, Sepalikawo, Sandawan Ruwin and Sitha Umathu Wela. On 9 September 2018, she conducted a Bollywood dancing workshop at 10.30 am to 12.30 pm at Stretch Dance School, Pagoda Road, Nugegoda. In 2019, she founded the dance studio "Studio Steps" to teach Bollywood dancing.

In 2021, she was included in the Raffealla Fernando Celebrity Calendar along with many other Sri Lankan celebrities which is considered as one of the highest civilian honours awarded to an individual. In the same year, she made a cameo appearance in the soap opera Sangeethe.
