= Derana Dream Star =

Sri Lankan reality series

- Logo of Derana Dream Star season 10 in 2021
- Created by: TV Derana
- Based on: Music
- Directed by: Sharmila Dharmarasa
- Judges: Keerthi Pasquel; Samitha Mudunkotuwa; Nadeeka Guruge; Indrachapa Liyanage
- Theme music composer: TV Derana
- Country of origin: Sri Lanka
- Original language: Sinhala
- No. of seasons: 12

Production
- Producers: Kelum Darshana; Krishanthi Rajika
- Production locations: Colombo, Sri Lanka
- Running time: 1h 30m

Original release
- Network: TV Derana
- Release: 2008 – present

Derana Dream Star is a Sri Lankan reality television series by television channel TV Derana. Dream Star first season was started in 2008 as the first season of Derana Dream Star. By 2026 TV Derana has presented over 12 seasons of Dream Star since the beginning of 2008. The program name means "Way to be a star". Program is presenting in TV Derana Dream Star studio in Colombo, Sri Lanka. From season one to nine, the winner was elected by the SMS votes cast by the people and the program wasn't live, since season ten, the program has been turned into a live reality program, the winner is elected by the majority of people votes cast through the online. (Note: TV Derana released DERANA REALITY APP to vote online through the online app.)

In 2012 Derana Dream Star season IV was held and announced the new theme song of "Udawediya Male" (Raween Kanishka), on behalf of the Dream Star season IV. (Note: Udawediya Male is a song by Raween Kanishka, Sasindu Wijesiri and Sithum Nimantha in Dream Star season IV.) from the season I to IX the program was judged by three judges, but since the season X, four judges have been introduced to the board. Keerthi Pasquel, Samitha Mudunkotuwa, Indrachapa Liyanage and Nadeeka Guruge have been representing the present judge board since 2024. The program includes workshops for the competitors in the program.

Dream Star is presenting few rounds to elect to the grand finale. Udesh Indula, Upekha Nirmani, Keshan Shashindra, Sasindu Wijesiri, M.G Danushka, Janith Iddamalgoda, Suneera Sumanga, Thanura Madugeeth Dissanayake, Falan Andrea, Dulanga Sampath, Anjali Herath and Janani Imathma listed in order as the winners from season I to XII. (Note: Upekha Nirmani won the first place in Dream Star season I as the very first female winner in Dream Star history)

== Seasons ==
=== Dream Star season I (2008) ===
Dream Star season I was started in the year 2008. Derana Dream Star season I final competition was held at the Sugathadasa Indoor Stadium Colombo, Sri Lanka. Udesh Indula won the first place in Dream Star season I. Milinda Sandaruwan was the first runner-up, while nilupuli dilhara was placed 2nd runner up. Nirosha Virajini, Rohana Bogoda and Keerthi Pasquel judged the contestants.

=== Dream Star season II (2010) ===
Dream Star season II was started in the year 2010. Upekha Nirmani, 18 years old schoolgirl from Negombo created history as very first female winner of the Dream Star history. Nirosha Virajini, Rohana Bogoda and Keerthi Pasquel judged the contestants throughout the Dream Star season II. Derana Dream Star season II final competition was held at the Sugathadasa Indoor Stadium Colombo, Sri Lanka. Udesh Manoj from Galle was the first runner-up while Nimesh Chamika from Panadura was placed third in the Dream Star season II.

=== Dream Star season III (2011) ===
Dream Star season III was started in the year 2011. Keshan Shashindra won the first place in Dream Star season III. Shanaka Udeesha from Gampola was the first runner-up, while Manuja Mahawattha was placed 2nd runner up. Nirosha Virajini, Rohana Bogoda and Keerthi Pasquel judged the contestants throughout the Dream Star season III. Derana Dream Star season III final competition was held at the Sugathadasa Indoor Stadium Colombo, Sri Lanka.

=== Dream Star season IV (2012) ===
Dream Star season IV was started in the year 2012. "Udawediya Male" song was released as the theme song of Dream Star season IV. Sasindu Wijesiri won the first place in Dream Star season IV. Raween Kanishka was the first runner-up, while sithum nimantha placed 2nd runner up. Keerthi Pasquel, Chandrika Siriwardena and Nadeeka Guruge judged the contestants throughout the Dream Star season IV. Derana Dream Star season IV final competition was held at the Sugathadasa Indoor Stadium Colombo, Sri Lanka.

=== Dream Star season V (2014) ===
Dream Star season V was started in the year 2014. M.G Danushka won the first place in Dream Star season V. Vishmitha Sachintha was the first runner-up, while Lahiru Prabath was placed third in the Dream Star season V. Keerthi Pasquel, Samitha Mudunkotuwa and Nadeeka Guruge judged the contestants throughout the Dream Star season V. Derana Dream Star season V final competition was held at the Sugathadasa Indoor Stadium Colombo, Sri Lanka.

=== Dream Star season VI (2015) ===
Dream Star season VI was started in the year 2015. Janith Iddamalgoda won the first place in Dream Star season VI. Yashodha Priyadarshani was the first runner-up while Chithroo Patalee was placed third in the Dream Star season VI. Keerthi Pasquel, Samitha Mudunkotuwa and Nadeeka Guruge judged the contestants throughout the Dream Star season VI. Derana Dream Star season VI final competition was held at the Sugathadasa Indoor Stadium Colombo, Sri Lanka.

=== Dream Star season VII (2017) ===
Dream Star season VII was started in the year 2017. Suneera Sumanga Dias won the first place in Dream Star season VII. Shalin Kaushalya was the first runner-up while Mahesha Sandamali was placed third in the Dream Star season VII. Keerthi Pasquel, Samitha Mudunkotuwa and Nadeeka Guruge judged the contestants throughout the Dream Star season VII. Derana Dream Star season VII final competition was held at the Sugathadasa Indoor Stadium Colombo, Sri Lanka.

=== Dream Star season VIII (2018) ===
Dream Star season VIII was started in the year 2018. Thanura Madugeeth Dissanayake won the first place in Dream Star season VII. Raveen Tharuka was the first runner-up while Krishadee Ranathunga was placed third in the Dream Star season VIII. Keerthi Pasquel, Samitha Mudunkotuwa and Nadeeka Guruge judged the contestants throughout the Dream Star season VIII. Derana Dream Star season VIII final competition was held at the Sugathadasa Indoor Stadium Colombo, Sri Lanka.

=== Dream Star season IX (2020) ===
Dream Star season IX was started in the year 2020. Falan Andrea won the first place in Dream Star season IX in 2020. Nuwandhika Senarathne was the first runner-up while Gihan Bandara was placed third in the Dream Star season IX in 2020. Keerthi Pasquel, Samitha Mudunkotuwa and Nadeeka Guruge judged the contestants throughout the Dream Star season IX. Derana Dream Star season IX final competition was held at the Maharagama youth center Maharagama, Sri Lanka.

=== Dream Star season X (2021) ===
Dream Star season X was started in the year 2021. Dulanga Sampath won the first place in Dream Star season X in 2021. Anjalee Methsara was the first runner-up while Rajitha Bhanuka was placed third in the Dream Star season X in 2021. Keerthi Pasquel, Samitha Mudunkotuwa, Nadeeka Guruge and Umara Sinhawansa judged the contestants throughout the Dream Star season X. Derana Dream Star season X final competition was held at the Nelum Pokuna Mahinda Rajapaksa Theatre Colombo, Sri Lanka.

=== Dream Star season XI (2023) ===
Dream Star season XI was started in the year 2023. Keerthi Pasquel, Samitha Mudunkotuwa, Nadeeka Guruge and Ashanthi De Alwis judged the contestants throughout the Dream Star season XI. Derana Dream Star season XI final competition was held at the Sugathadasa Indoor Stadium Colombo, Sri Lanka. Anjali Herath crowned as the Dream Star. Vidusha Rajaguru became first runner-up while Apoorwa Ashawari became second runner-up.

=== Dream Star season XII (2024) ===
Dream Star season XII was started in the year 2024. Keerthi Pasquel, Samitha Mudunkotuwa, Nadeeka Guruge and Indrachapa Liyanage judged the contestants throughout the Dream Star season XII. Derana Dream Star season XII final competition was held at the Sugathadasa Indoor Stadium Colombo, Sri Lanka. Janani Imathma crowned as the Dream Star. Anupama Gunathilake became first runner-up while Brian Hanks became second runner-up.

== Dream Star winners ==
Dream Star winners and runner-up and second runner-up
Year	Seasons	Winner(s)	Runner-up	2Runner-up
2008	Dream Star season I	Udesh Indula	Milinda Sandaruwan	Nilupuli Dilhara
2010	Dream Star season II	Upekha Nirmani	Udesh Manoj	Nimesh Chamika
2011	Dream Star season III	Keshan Shashindra	Shanaka Udeesha	Manuja Mahawattha
2012	Dream Star season IV	Sasindu Wijesiri	Raween Kanishka	Sithum Nimantha
2014	Dream Star season V	M.G Danushka	Vishmitha Sachinthana	Lahiru Prabath
2015	Dream Star season VI	Janith Iddamalgoda	Yashodha Priyadarshani	Chithroo Patalee
2017	Dream Star season VII	Suneera Sumanga	Shalin Kaushalya	Mahesha Sandamali
2018	Dream Star season VIII	Thanura Madugeeth Dissanayake	Raveen Tharuka	Krishadee Ranathunga
2020	Dream Star season IX	Falan Andrea	Nuwandhika Senarathne	Gihan Bandara
2021	Dream Star season X	Dulanga Sampath	Anjalee Methsara	Rajitha Bahanuka
2023	Dream Star season XI	Anjali Herath	Vidusha Rajaguru	Apoorwa Ashawari
2024	Dream Star season XII	Janani Imathma	Anupama Gunathilake	Brian Hanks

== Dream Star Judges and Hosts ==
Year	Seasons	Judges	Host(s)
2008	Dream Star season I	Keerthi Pasquel, Nirosha Virajini, Rohana Bogoda	Amila Abeysekara
2010	Dream Star season II	Keerthi Pasquel, Nirosha Virajini, Rohana Bogoda	Amila Abeysekara
2011	Dream Star season III	Keerthi Pasquel, Nirosha Virajini, Rohana Bogoda	Amila Abeysekara
2012	Dream Star season IV	Keerthi Pasquel, Nadeeka Guruge, Chandrika Siriwardena	Amila Abeysekara
2014	Dream Star season V	Keerthi Pasquel, Samitha Mudunkotuwa, Nadeeka Guruge	Akila Dhanuddara
2015	Dream Star season VI	Keerthi Pasquel, Samitha Mudunkotuwa, Nadeeka Guruge	Akila Dhanuddara
2017	Dream Star season VII	Keerthi Pasquel, Samitha Mudunkotuwa, Nadeeka Guruge	Akila Dhanuddara
2018	Dream Star season VIII	Keerthi Pasquel, Samitha Mudunkotuwa, Nadeeka Guruge	Akila Dhanuddara
2020	Dream Star season IX	Keerthi Pasquel, Samitha Mudunkotuwa, Nadeeka Guruge	Raween Kanishka
2021	Dream Star season X	Keerthi Pasquel, Samitha Mudunkotuwa, Nadeeka Guruge, Umara Sinhawansa	Raween Kanishka
2023	Dream Star season XI	Keerthi Pasquel, Samitha Mudunkotuwa, Nadeeka Guruge, Ashanthi De Alwis	Vishwa Lanka Falan Andrea
2024	Dream Star season XII	Keerthi Pasquel, Samitha Mudunkotuwa, Nadeeka Guruge, Indrachapa Liyanage	Vishwa Lanka Falan Andrea

== See also ==
- TV Derana
- Nuwandhika Senarathne
