= Keerthi Pasquel =

Sri Lankan musician (born 1956)

Keerthi Pasquel කීර්ති පැස්කුවල්
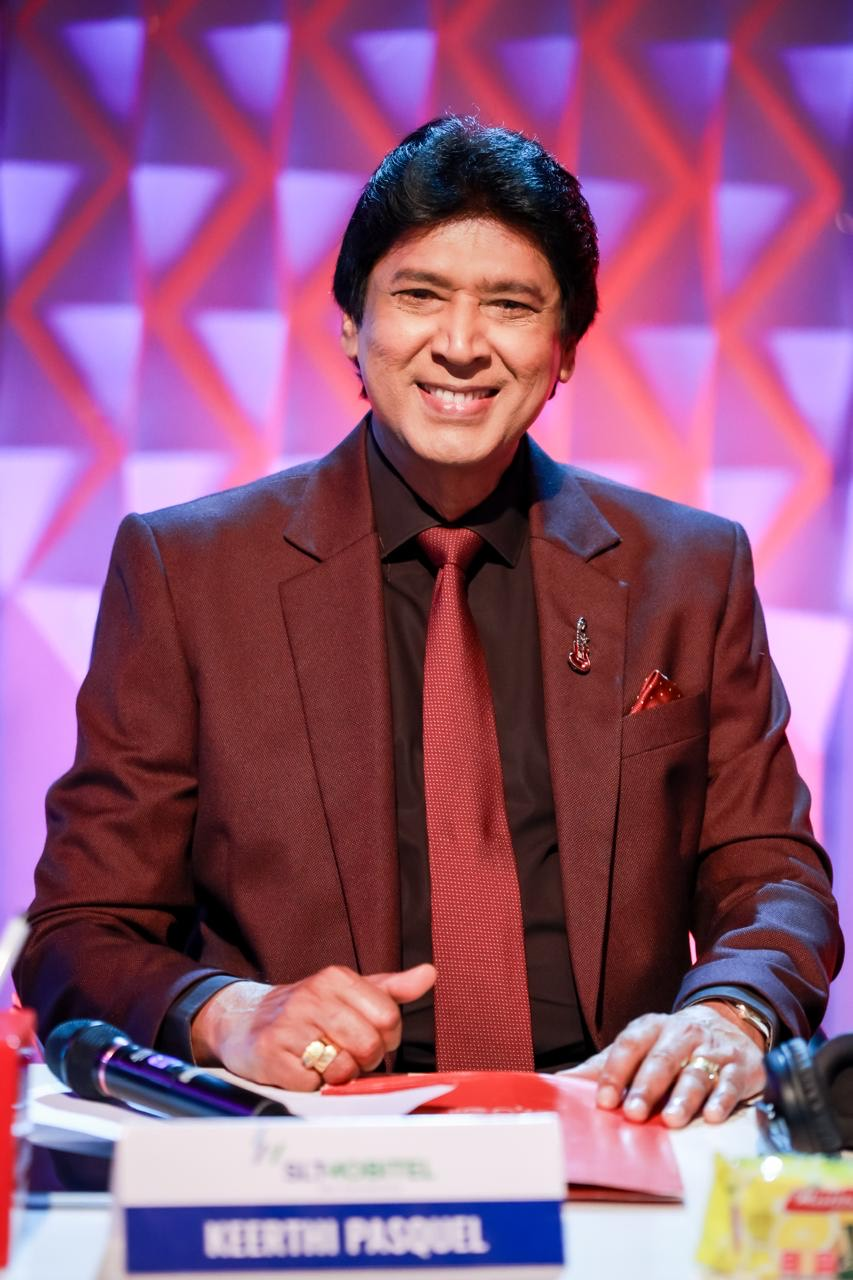
- Born: Pasquel Wasam Ananda Keerthirathna; 29 January 1956 (age 70); Kandy, Sri Lanka
- Education: Dharmaraja College
- Occupations: Singer; composer; guitarist
- Spouse(s): Muditha Fernando (m. 1978–div.1995); Chandana Mudalige (1995-present)
- Children: 4
- Parents: Pasquel Wasam Gayaneris (father); S. W. Leslin (mother)
- Relatives: Padmasiri Pasquel (brother); Chethana Ranasinghe (daughter-in-law)
- Musical career
- Genres: Pop; soul; rhythm and blues; Country music
- Instruments: Vocals, Bass Guitar, Lead Guitar, Rhythm guitar
- Years active: 1976–present
- Labels: Torana; Ransilu

Pasquel Wasam Ananda Keerthirathna (born January 29, 1956), popularly known as Keerthi Pasquel (Sinhala: කීර්ති පැස්කුවල්:), is a Sri Lankan pop musician and composer. He has been performing for more than three decades and has won a number of awards. Keerthi is a judge on the reality show Derana Dream Star and sets the record as the only judge in Sri Lanka to sit for 10 consecutive seasons in a reality show beginning from 2008 until today. He has been active in music education and in social welfare. He is affectionately known as the "balladeer of Sinhala music".

== Early life ==
Keerthi Pasquel was born on 29 January 1956 in the city of Hanthana, Kandy as the youngest of four siblings. His father was Pasquel Wasam Gayaneris and mother was S. W. Leslin. He had four elder sisters: Nalini, Rukmani Chandra, Chitrani and one elder brother, Padmasiri. Keerthi studied at Dharmaraja College up until his GCE O/level examination.

Keerthi's passion for music was greatly influenced by his family where he grew up amidst soothing music all around his home. The melodious singing prowess of his mother was a huge influence on Keerthi. His father could play the harmonium. Keerthi was just ten years old when his father developed an illness and eventually died, eventually leaving his mother to shoulder the responsibility of five children as well as taking over her husband's business. Keerthi's mother's dream was to make him a doctor but he started to follow a course on lathe machinery at the Technical College, after his O/Levels.

His brother Padmasiri Pasquel was the first member of the family to bring a guitar to their home. He had joined a group called "Halians" where he played the lead guitar. But Padmasiri never allowed Keerthi to touch the instrument, because he feared the boy might neglect studies if he focused on music. He had three cousin brothers – Bandula, Lalith and Ranjith, who frequently patronized their home to learn the guitar from Padmasiri. So Keerthi started learning about guitar chords from Bandula, on the sly. Gradually, Keerthi learnt the guitar secretly. He took part in school concerts as he could sing well.

When he was in Grade 9, the school had a talent contest and Keerthi was the obvious choice in the singing segment. He even trained the final ten students with whom he himself competed. The grand finale was held at the Kandy Buddhist Centre. Keerthi sang Victor Rathnayake's Adawan Desin. Unfortunately for him, the music orchestra backing him gave a low tempo and the song finally ended up like a poem. All his hopes of winning the contest were smashed. The guys whom he taught overtook him. But he never gave up.

Having learnt the guitar from his cousin Bandula, Keerthi and a few teenage friends formed a small musical group which played at functions but was never paid. One day, Keerthi's group was invited to perform at a wedding. Riyaldeen, having heard about Keerthi's skills, invited him to join as a bass guitarist for the musical group "Galaxies" led by Stanley Peiris. When Keerthi was attending the technical course, he tried to join the Army band and went for interviews too. He was called for training during this period. But when he told this to Stanley Peiris, he had asked him to remain in the band as the bass guitarist.

== Professional musical career ==
As time went on, Keerthi became a permanent member of the "Galaxies" band and came to Colombo in 1978. Though Keerthi played the bass guitar, at these recordings he was given small percussion instruments like maracas, clappers, triangle and bells. Keerthi was invited by Gratien Ananda to play the bass guitar for four new songs he was planning to record. Rookantha Gunathilake to be on the keyboard, Sarath Wickrama the accordion and Mahinda Bandara was slotted for the lead. The first milestone song was Etha Duraka Desa Pawela.

Later on, Keerthi befriended Thilak Dias who had a unique playing style with the guitar with a distinctive style of playing it with his fingers. Since then Keerthi, being intrigued by Thilak's style, also used this finger style on the bass guitar for all his recordings and he started getting more recordings as a bass guitarist. In addition to Stanley Peiris, Keerthi was fortunate to get work in the recordings of musicians like Sarath Dassanayake and Rohana Weerasinghe. He was invited to join Patrick Denipitiya's Combo as a bass guitarist and vocalist singing songs of Clarence Wijewardena, W. D. Amaradeva, Nihal Nelson, Neville Fernando, Nanda Malini and Rukmani Devi. This, he did even with "Galaxies" and later played as the bass guitarist for the band "Mount Chimes".

As his brother Padmasiri returned to the country in 1982, they formed a band called "Colour Lite" with Mahinda, Padmasiri, Gamini Perera and Ranjith Silva. It is during this time that Nanda Malini had been on the lookout for a male chorus singer. She had asked Stanley if he could recommend somebody where Stanley had suggested Keerthi's name. This resulted in a memorable chapter in Keerthi's musical career. From 1982 to 1985 he was a chorus singer and bass guitarist in Nanda Malini's "Sathyaye Geethaya", contributing for 530 concerts. In 1983, "Foutunes" band made a reunion.

In the meantime, Keerthi also played for "Latha Rathriya", "Baig Geethika" and concerts of Freddie Silva and Jothi Rathriya of H. R. Jothipala. His original debut song Hanthana Nil Kandu Weti Athara was recorded in 1980 and his maiden audio cassette "Nil Ahase" was released in 1985. In 1981, Keerthi helped his friend Sunil Dharmasena produce a cassette. During this period, cassette revolution was emerging in the country and Keerthi and his teammates were busy with recordings. Song recordings at Bishop's House Joe Neth Studio had to cease by 10 pm. When there were days they finished off around 8.30 pm, the intervening time was used to record 10 songs for Keerthi such as Oba Ma Hamu Wu, Neela Ahase and Kavikaraye.

Keerthi used to play for Independent Television Network's (ITN) popular Madu Rasanga segment presented by Ariyasiri Vithanage and Indunil Dissanayake and produced by P. L. A. Somapala. Generally, for Madu Rasanga, the original artistes and musicians mimed for the original tracks, but it was done skillfully. During one such recording in 1983, the original artiste had not turned up on time and the musicians had to idle for some time. The boys in the technical team, knowing Keerthi had some songs of his own suggested that Keerthi recorded one of his songs for Madu Rasanga. The boys enthusiastically did the recording Neela Ahase Sende Walaa, in the absence of producer Somapala. In 1984, much to Keerthi's surprise, this ohng was telecast on Madu Rasanga and it became an overnight hit. That was Keerthi's biggest turning point in his tuneful career.

During the Nitin Mukesh concert at the Galle Face Green in 1985, Keerthi was an orchestra member. Suddenly Rajini Selvanayagam came up to them with a sheet of paper and wanted someone to do a nice Baila, Kapiriñña melody for the words Sinhala Raja Kaale Newei since her troupe had a dance item lined up during the concert. Ranjith Perera instantly made a tune while Gratien Ananda, Mervin Perera, Mahinda and Keerthi were slotted to sing it. But on the day of the show, there was only one microphone before Keerthi. Chairman of TNL TV, Shan Wickremesinghe did the video recording and it had picked only Keerthi's voice. So, it automatically became Keerthi's song later on.

Keerthi's maiden solo musical concert "Keerthi Gee Sankalpana" was held on January 28, 1988, followed by another performance the following day at the Lumbini Theatre, bringing him incredible feedback from his fans. But circumstances led him to leave the band eventually and in 1983 he joined "Super Fortunes" led by Ranjith Perera.

In 2000, he started a tourism business, but following a series of unsuccessful business ventures, Keerthi and his family left to New Zealand for four years. Following his return, Suresh de Silva requested him to voice a melody he had given him in 1998. The lyrics were penned by Lakmali Kariyawasam. That song was called Kandula Ithin Samaweyan, which became a hit and marked the second innings of Keerthi's musical journey. Keerthi revived his studio "Sonic Recording Studio" with digital state of the art equipment and gave service to all artists in the music industry for a nominal fee. He continued publishing his Sonic diary which listed the contact numbers of all those in the music field. The diary is helpful to all those in the field even today. He went on many overseas musical tours very often to countries such as the USA, Canada, the United Kingdom, Italy, France, Japan, and those in the Middle East where performed in various musical shows and other events.

In March 2010 to commemorate his thirty years singing career, he released visual songs under the title Sivu Pethi Kusuma, which includes the four songs: Manamaala Handawe, Bakini Gahe, Hada Maage and Gala Yaawee Jeevithe. On 24 November 2013, he performed the unplugged show Keerthi Acoustica Unplugged Live Concert at 6.30pm at the BMICH, Colombo. On 20 May 2017, he celebrated 40 years in musical career by performing the concert titled Keerthi Gee Evolution of Music at the BMICH at 7 pm. Later in the same year, he collaborated with Shani Nanayakkara to sing the duet Thaniwela Inna.

In 2018, he released his 600th solo track Hitha Kohedo Gihin. In May 2019, Keerthi released the song Kadulakwa Aha Arina. On 29 January 2023, he performed in the musical show Manamala Hendewa from 6:45 p.m. onwards at the Nelum Pokuna Theatre.

== Filmography ==
With Keerthi's growing popularity, tele drama makers, began requesting Keerthi to star in various small screen creations. Vijaya Dharmasri featured Keerthi opposite Susantha Chandramali and Ranjan Ramanayake in the film Charulatha. Then director Sirithunga Perera had Keerthi playing the lead with Achala Alles in Gawwen Gawwa. Later, Keerthi was cast opposite Vasanthi Chathurani in Bennett Rathnayake's teledrama Tharu. Later in New Zealand, Keerthi acted in Saaraa scripted and produced by Sumitra Rahubadda, playing with Duleeka Marapana and Ama Wijesekara.

== Personal life ==
Keerthi married Muditha Fernando in 1978 and had a daughter and son. His eldest daughter, Dinesha Pasquel is now married domiciled in the UK with her husband and son. His son, Kasun Pasquel works for Expolanka Group. Kasun is married to Chethana Ranasinghe who is also a singer. In 1994 his first marriage ended and he married Chandana Mudalige in 1995. He has two daughters from Chandana – Charuni Pasquel who is a law graduate and Natalia Pasquel - a business management graduate. Charuni was graduated from Horizon in 2019 with the highest aggregate marks and achieved highest average for April 2020 Preliminary year Law College examinations.

== Awards and accolades ==
In 1996 he received an international award from the World Science Council in Japan, where he competed with musicians from 13 countries.

He has held the position as Chairman of the Sri Lankan Singers' Association (SLASA) multiple times.

On 26 January 2020, 256-page hardbound book titled Keerthi: Miyuru Saraka Anandaneeya Charikawa written by Upali Kumarawansa was launched at 3.00 pm at the Tharangani Hall of National Film Corporation. During the event, a DVD of his musical concert Manamala Hendewa was also released.

== Pasquel Sound of Music ==
Keerthi was the founder of the 'Pasquel Sound of Music' in 2006, a school to teach voice training and instrumental music for those who wish to be professionals in the music industry. At 'Pasquel Sound of Music', established musicians train students to play a musical instrument. Tutors have included Harsha Makalanda, Chandrasena Hettiarachchi and Pasquel himself.

During COVID-19 lockdown period, he created fifty new songs since March 2020.

== Charity works ==
=== Orphanage project ===
Keerthi launched a project called 'The Child' to entertain children from orphanages and to recognize their capabilities. In 2005, 'The Child' collected sponsorship funds that mainly went towards the rehabilitation of the orphaned children from the Boxing Day Tsunami of 2004. This is an ongoing project by Pasquel, organizing not only musical shows, but also dramas, films and amateur talent shows.

=== Other projects ===
Keerthi formed the charity program "Help Circles (Guarantee) Limited" where he started donations and money from his musical shows to establish Bono Marrow Transplant Unit to the Maharagama Apeksha Hospital. Then he donated a HIPEC machine to the General Sir John Kotelawala Defence University and funded the Handapanagala Water purification project ‘Pivithuru Pen Pooja’.

With the help of Ministry of Education and Zonal Directors of aesthetic studies, Keerthi presented 500 violins to 1000 students representing all nine provinces.

== See also ==
- Sri Lankan music
- List of Sri Lankan musicians
