= Anagarika Dharmapala Srimathano =

- Sinhala: අනගාරික ධර්මපාල ශ්‍රීමතාණෝ
- Directed by: Sanath Abeysekara
- Written by: Sanath Abeysekara
- Produced by: Ven. Kirama Vimalajothi; Sunil T. Films
- Starring: Palitha Silva; Lucky Dias; Sriyantha Mendis
- Cinematography: Sujith Nishantha
- Edited by: Nandi Jayakody
- Music by: Rohana Weerasinghe
- Distributed by: EAP Films
- Release date: 5 September 2014
- Country: Sri Lanka
- Language: Sinhala
- Budget: 400 Lakhs LKR

Anagarika Dharmapala Srimathano (Sinhala: අනගාරික ධර්මපාල ශ්‍රීමතාණෝ) is a 2014 Sri Lankan Sinhala biographical history film directed by Sanath Abeysekara and co-produced by Ven. Banagala Upatissa Thero and Sunil T. Fernando for Sunil T. Films. It stars Palitha Silva in lead role along with Lucky Dias and Sriyantha Mendis. Music composed by Rohana Weerasinghe. It is the 1211th Sri Lankan film in the Sinhala cinema.

The film reveals about the life of Sri Lanka's Anagarika Dharmapala, a founding contributor of non-violent Sinhalese Buddhist nationalism and Buddhism.

== Cast ==
- Palitha Silva as Anagarika Dharmapala
- Lucky Dias as News editor Piyadasa Sirisena (Cameo appearance)
- Sriyantha Mendis as Wijewardena (Cameo appearance)
- Hyacinth Wijeratne as Mallika Dharmagunawardhana
- G.R Perera as Manamperi
- Madhava Wijesinghe as Reporter
- Sandun Wijesiri as English railway chief
- Dayasiri Hettiarachchi
- Gayan Wickramathilaka (Cameo appearance)
- Kriz Chris Henri Harriz as Government agent
- Prasad Samarathunga
- Ruwangi Ratnayake as Reporter
- Sanjaya Amarasinghe

== Soundtrack ==
No.	Title	Singer(s)	Length
1.	"Jathiye Ran Koth"	Nanda Malini
