= Iskole =

- Iskole title card
- Starring: Thulanga Jayakodi; Danushka Sampath
- Opening theme: Sihinayak Mawna (Nuwandhika Senarathne)
- Country of origin: Sri Lanka
- Original language: Sinhala
- No. of seasons: 1
- No. of episodes: 1400

Production
- Producer: YUKI Films
- Production location: Sri Lanka
- Running time: 20 Mins

Original release
- Network: TV Derana
- Release: 8 March 2021 – present

Iskole (Sinhala: ඉස්කෝලේ) is a Sri Lankan television prime-time soap opera broadcast on TV Derana since 2021. It was released on 8 March 2021 and continues in every weekday from Monday to Friday at 7:30 pm to 8:00 pm. It is written by Saman Edirimunee and Directed by Salinda Rathnayake.

== Plot ==
Vihara, a teacher from Colombo gets a transfer to a rural village to teach the poor kids. She is engaged to a wealthy businessman called Roshan. Her parents are both well known doctors and work in Roshan's dad hospital. While Vihara does not have any feelings towards Roshan and does not want to marry him, her parents repeatedly insist that she marry Roshan, but she resists and tells them that she had enough and she going to take this opportunity to leave home and go to the village. Her parents object at first, but later change their minds and let her go. She and her mother arrive at the village by car guided by a man called Randika. Suddenly, their car is nearly bumped into herd of cows crossing the road. After the close accident, they arrive at her boarding house where she was going to stay. The boarding house belongs to Emelyne Hamine, who is like the female head of the village and her family being the only rich family in the whole village. Her younger daughter, Nandini, and her family live in that house. Also, her middle daughter, Jayamini and her two sons. Jayamini has worked overseas as a maid since her husband leaving them, so she had to leave her two sons, Yahapath and Thameera with her younger sister and mother, only coming for seasonal visits.

The teacher finally settles in the village and goes to the school to teach, with another new teacher called Aloka, who also got a transfer to the school from Kandy, her hometown. In matter of time, they manage to bond with the students and the staff especially Vihara, a teacher who is loved by the students of her dancing class for her studious and active personality. She meets a girl called Anagi, who is excellent at dancing. She remembers the real reason for her decision to move to the village was that she saw a girl in the newspaper, a young girl, got chosen for a national dancing competition, but couldn’t go because of family problems and that girl she was looking for turned out to be Anagi, who she discovers was in her class all along. So, she starts teaching Anagi how to dance and a bunch of other students during school hours and after hours.

Things run smooth, until they discover that the MP who is in charge of the local district wants to close the village school and move the students into another school. By this, he scares the principal into believing that his pension will be lower when he retires due to the low number of students attending the school. So, Vihara and Aloka teacher form an alliance with a male teacher called Ranthilaka Sir, who is a teacher that was raised in the village and went to the school as a child. With this alliance, they seek help from the local education director who is in charge of education department in that area, to promote the message to parents and others that the school shouldn’t close.

Meanwhile, in the midst of everything else, Vihara gets to know more about Randika, the man who she had met previously in the close accident. She also gets to know that he is the grandson of Emelyne Hamine. Randika is also praised by everyone for his service to the village since he does a business and helps anyone who’s in need. He has a best friend named Chula, who underwent trouble finding a job and ended up wandering around the village, until Randika offered him a job of being a driver to drive his small truck and be his assistant.

From there the story goes in to outline how Vihara struggles to save the school and receives help from Randika and his friends to build an alumni association. It also examines how she is going deal with her parents' insistence that she marry Roshan. Randika falls in love with Vihara but does not accept that he is in love since he had previously had a girlfriend and they broke up. Also how Vihara adores Thameera and Yahapath as her children since their mother is not present in the country and how they are mistreated by their grandmother and auntie.

== Cast ==
=== Main cast ===
- Thulanga Jayakodi as Vihara
- Danushka Sampath as Randika
- Naduni Karunathilake as Aloka
- Heshara Wickramaarachchi as Pathum
- Nisal Sathsara as Dulan
- Hirushi Perera as Anagi

=== Supporting cast ===
- Susila Kottage as Emelyne Hamine
- Dasun Ediripakshe as Chula
- Sahan Ranwala as Ranthilaka Sir
- Bhanu Prabhasha as Roshan
- Sangeetha Basnayake as Vihara's mother
- Ruwanthi Mangala as Jayamini
- Sashrika Semini as Dinuki
- Wasantha Kumarasiri as Nandani's husband
- Ananda Athukorala as Ranjith
- Sudharshi Galanigama as Chandani
- Roma Roshi Jayakody as Nandani
- Danushka Jayarathna as Sepalika
- Chirantha Ranwala as Vihara's father
- Wilmon Sirimanne as School Principal Sir
- Deepthi Weerasooriya as Suneth MP
- Ranjith Rubasinghe as Kapila
