= Himaya Bandara =

Sri Lankan actress and presenter

Himaya Bandara හිමායා බණ්ඩාර
- Born: Anjali Himaya Bandara; January 13, 1990 (age 36)
- Citizenship: Sri Lankan
- Occupations: Actress, television presenter
- Years active: 2010–present
- Known for: Deveni Inima (as Sonali Teacher)

Himaya Bandara (born 13 January) is a Sri Lankan actress and television presenter. She is best known for her role as "Sonali Teacher" in the popular television series Deweni Inima

== Career ==
Bandara began her career as a television host for programs such as Hada Randi Paya on Swarnavahini. She later transitioned into acting and gained significant recognition for her performances in Sri Lankan teledramas. Her most notable work includes roles in Deveni Inima and Hadawathe Kathawa.

She has also appeared in Sri Lankan films, including the action film Sooraya Weeraya

=== Selected Television series ===
- Deweni Inima
- Hadawathe Kathawa
- Hima Kandulu
- Muthu Palasa
- Piththala Konderuma
- Sanda Saavi
- Sudu Gindara
- Wandana

== Filmography ==
Year	Film	Role	Ref.
2019	Sama Kumaru Kathawa		
2024	Sooraya Weeraya		
