= Anura Srinath =

Sri Lankan artist

- Born: September 6, 1957 (age 68); Kirulapana, Sri Lanka
- Education: Lumbini College
- Occupations: Artist, Painter, Illustrator, Cartoonist
- Website: anurasrinath.com

Anura Srinath (born September 6, 1957) is a Sri Lankan artist, painter, illustrator and cartoonist.

== Early life ==
Anura was born in Sri Lanka and educated at Lumbini College (Colombo). He grew up in a home which surroundings were full of sketches of temple paintings and traditional Sinhalese art and he showed a passion and a skill for drawing from an early age. His father rejected the idea of a career in art. Anura's father, M.S Perera, hoped his son would become a Doctor, and though Anura would study in Biology stream for Advanced Level in School.

== Career beginnings ==
After leaving school he joined the Upali Group of Newspapers as a cartoonist for the comic-strip paper ‘Suhada’ in 1980. In 1981, Upali Newspapers (Private) Limited was launched and he was recruited as an artist for the "Chitramitra" comic magazine by the group.

His paintings are found in various museums and galleries abroad, as well as in private collections in Sri Lanka and throughout the world.

== Exhibitions ==
=== Anuralokaya solo exhibition ===
- Anuralokaya 1 (August 2012), National Art Gallery, Sri Lanka
- Anuralokaya 2 (January 2013), Matara
- Anuralokaya 3 (February 2013), Anuradhapura
- Anuralokaya 4 (November 2013), Boralesgamuwa
- Anuralokaya 5 (2014), University of Sri Jayewardenepura
- Anuralokaya 6
- Anuralokaya 7
- Anuralokaya 8
- Anuralokaya 9
- Anuralokaya 10
- Anuralokaya 11 (July 2016)
- Anuralokaya 12
- Anuralokaya 13
- Anuralokaya 14
- Anuralokaya 15 (September 2017)
- Anuralokaya 16 (September, 2017)
- Anuralokaya 17 (October, 2017)

=== Siththaru Andi Roo (සිත්තරු ඇඳි රූ) ===
- Siththaru Andi Roo 1 (December 2011)
- Siththaru Andi Roo 2 (June 2013)
- Siththaru Andi Roo 3 (October 2015)
- Siththaru Andi Roo 4 (November 2016)

=== 13 Strokes / Lionel Wendt Art Centre ===
A three-day exhibition will be held at The Lionel Wendt Art Center featuring 13 artists.

=== Speculo 2017: National Art Festival ===
Art exhibition hosted by SriLankan Airlines at J. D. A. Perera Gallery.

=== Kala Pola (1995 - 2019) ===
Participant of the annual open air art fair from 1995 - 2019
