= List of 2011 Cricket World Cup broadcasting rights =

International Cricket Council sold its rights of broadcasting for 2011 Cricket World Cup for around US$2 Billion to ESPN Star Sports. It would be broadcasting all around the world in about 220 countries.

For the first time, the Cricket World Cup will be broadcast in High Definition (HD) format. Live matches will also be shown by 3G mobile streaming for the first time.

Each and every match will be covered by 27 cameras including features like movable slips cameras and new low 45-degree field cameras. The broadcast production will also have a mid-wicket camera position for live running between wickets.

In United States, the official broadcaster Willow TV will broadcast the matches on Dish Network and DirecTV on the Willow Cricket HD channel. Using IPTV technology, Willow TV will broadcast matches to users of Roku, Google TV, PlayStation 3, DishworldIPTV, Boxee Box, Samsung Internet@TV, and Netgear Push2TV HD devices. The matches are also available on multiple tablet or mobile devices.

== Television ==
Country/Continent	Broadcaster(s)
Africa	Supersport
Australia	Nine Network Only Australia matches and the final (on delay); Fox Sports
Bangladesh	Bangladesh Television Day/night matches and Bangladesh matches only
Canada	Asian Television Network: PPV
People's Republic of China	Star Sports
European Union	Zee Cafe Hindi commentary
Fiji	Fiji TV: Sky Pacific World
Indian Subcontinent	ESPN; Star Sports Hindi commentary Star Cricket; DD National India matches, semi-finals and finals
Malaysia	Astro
Middle East	Arab Radio and Television Network: CricOne
New Zealand	Sky Sport
Norway	NRK1 Second semi-final and final
Pacific Islands	Sky Pacific: Sky Pacific World
Pakistan	PTV, Geo Super
Philippines	SkyCable: PPV
Singapore	Star Cricket
South Africa	Sabc3 Sport South Africa matches
Sri Lanka	Sri Lanka Rupavahini Corporation: Channel Eye
Tonga	Digicel: PPV
United Kingdom	Sky Sports HD; Zee Cafe Hindi commentary
Ireland	Sky Sports HD; Zee Cafe Hindi commentary
United States	Willow TV, DirecTV, Dish Network
West Indies	Caribbean Media Corporation

== Radio ==
Country	Broadcaster
Australia	ABC Local Radio
Bangladesh	Bangladesh Betar
India	All India Radio
New Zealand	Radio Sport
Pakistan	Hum FM
South Africa	South African Broadcasting Corporation Radio 2000
Sri Lanka	FM Derana
United Arab Emirates	Channel 2 via Cricket Radio
United Kingdom	BBC Radio
Ireland	BBC Radio
United States	SiriusXM
West Indies	Caribbean Media Corporation

== Internet ==
Country/Continent	Broadcaster(s)
India	ESPN STAR Sports (Espnstar.com)
Pakistan	GEO Super (GEO Super Live)
Bangladesh	ESPN STAR Sports (Espnstar.com)
Nepal	ESPN STAR Sports (Espnstar.com)
Bhutan	ESPN STAR Sports (Espnstar.com)
Sri Lanka	ESPN STAR Sports (Espnstar.com)
Maldives	ESPN STAR Sports (Espnstar.com)
Southeast Asia	ESPN Star Sports (espnstar.com)
People's Republic of China	ESPN Star Sports (espnstar.com)
Africa	SuperSport (supersport.com)
Australia	Fox Sports (Foxsports.com.au)
England	BSkyB (skysports.com)
Wales	BSkyB (skysports.com)
Scotland	BSkyB (skysports.com)
Ireland	BSkyB (skysports.com)
New Zealand	Sky Sport (skysport.co.nz)
United States	Willow TV
West Indies	Caribbean Media Corporation (Cananews.com)
