= Adaraneeya Prarthana =

2022 Sri Lankan film

- Adaraneeya Prarthana
- Sinhala: ආදරණීය ප්‍රාර්ථනා
- Directed by: Wasawa Baduge
- Written by: Malindu Gajadheera; Ranganath Weerasingha
- Produced by: Wasawa Baduge; Yasas Medagedara; Ishantha Withanage
- Starring: Rahul Rishika; Shanudrie Priyasad; Nethmi Roshel; Mihirangi Hettiarachchi; Nimesh Weeranga
- Cinematography: Wasawa Baduge
- Edited by: Wasawa Baduge
- Music by: Yasas Medagedara
- Release date: 27 August 2022
- Country: Sri Lanka
- Language: Sinhala
- Box office: 6 crore LKR

Adaraneeya Prarthana (Sinhala: ආදරණීය ප්‍රාර්ථනා) is a 2022 Sinhala romance musical directed by Wasawa Baduge and produced by Ishantha Withanage. The film revolves around Rahul, whose fate becomes entangled with the lives of Parami and Menaka. Starring Shanudrie Priyasad, Nethmi Roshel, and Rahul Warawitage as Menaka, Parami, and Rahul, respectively, the music is directed by Yasas Medagedara.

Adaraneeya Prarthana premiered in Alberta, Canada on 27 August, and was theatrically released throughout Canada, Australia, Sri Lanka, United States, and Japan in the following months. The film received generally positive reviews from critics, with the soundtrack composed by musician and vocalist, Yasas Medagedara, garnering widespread acclaim.

A dream of Baduge, the film was stuck in development hell since 2016 until it was revived again in 2020, with the help of Medagedara. Adaraneeya Prarthana is framed like Bollywood Romance Concept films, and was entirely shot in Sri Lanka, despite Baduge's intentions to shoot the film in Australia, which was cancelled due to COVID-19 pandemic restrictions.

Adaraneeya Prarthana received 13 nominations at the Derana Lux Film Awards 2023, including Best Actress for Roshel and Best Direction for Baduge, and secured the award for the 'Popular Song' for the track Sewwandi Paya.

== Plot ==
In an opening monologue, a distraught Rahul compares sacrificial love and acquired love. Parami, a simple orphaned girl, decides to move to Colombo with her close relatives, Mr Seneviratne and his family, 3 months after the death of her mother. Meanwhile, Rahul, the youngest son of Mr Seneviratne, arrives in Sri Lanka from Australia; meeting Parami after a long time, he is immediately attracted to her. The family attends an art exhibition, where Parami asks Rahul whether he remembers the picture he drew of her when they were small; Rahul, unbeknown to the fact that Parami still cherished the picture, believes it is long gone. At the same time, Rahul shares his hope to open a restaurant, which Parami supports, whereas Menaka, his girlfriend, ridicules the idea, reasoning that it will not fit their status in society. Rahul, however, argues that he does not want to live to impress others, thereby creating tension in their relationship. Subsequently, Rahul hesitates in his decision to marry Menaka, but his father demands their marriage take place, having previously promised Menaka's parents, Mr. and Mrs. Gajanayake, leaving Rahul in frustration.

In the meantime, Rahul, with the help of his sister Madhu, her husband Saliya, and Parami, develops the restaurant. Menaka, envious about the growing relationship between Parami and Rahul, confronts Parami and berates her for addressing Rahul affectionately, hurting her deeply. In the following days, Parami leaves with Rahul and Madhu's family back to her village to memorialise the one year death anniversary of her mother. Rahul, fascinated by the beauty of her village, is taken on a tour around the village by Parami, during which their relationship evolves into a mutual love. Rahul and Parami return home, and interrupted by rain and a power surge, they consummate their love. On the next few days, Parami is oblivious to what occurred between them, and avoids Rahul on multiple occasions. Meanwhile, the Gajanayake and Seneviratne families begin organising Rahul and Menaka's marriage, and Parami reveals to Rahul that she is concerned about ruining their lives. Rahul, realising that they will never be able to be together, makes her promise that she will not leave him.

Menaka's and Rahul's wedding day dawns, and believing that she will only be an obstacle in their marriage, Parami flees from the wedding, leaving behind Rahul's drawing of her with a note confessing she loves him. Rahul finds the note, and is heartbroken. Following her departure, Rahul becomes more hostile and angrier towards Menaka, finding excuses in his business to stay away from her. Menaka is distraught by Rahul's change, and tells Madhu of her suspicion that Parami's abrupt departure and his behaviour are related, which Madhu forsakes as nonsense. Over time, Menaka's and Rahul's relationship worsens as Rahul begins to drink heavily, and Menaka is devastated. Eventually, an year passes, and on the eve of their wedding anniversary, Menaka admits to Rahul's accusation that she pretends she is happy in front of others, and following a heated moment, an enraged Rahul slaps Menaka and flees. The next day, Rahul having not yet returned, Menaka discovers Parami's picture, and her note. She calls Madhu, obtaining Parami's address, and leaves to find Parami in her home village. Menaka finds a baby in Parami's house, who is revealed to be Rahul and Parami's illegitimate daughter named Prarthana. Menaka feels sorry for Parami, and regrets the turn of events, but Parami ensures she is strong-willed, and decides to leave the village, asking Menaka to keep her decision a secret between them.

In the meantime, Rahul, who had presumably gotten to know Menaka's request from Madhu, arrives at the train station, and sees Parami and Menaka talking to each other. Parami approaches Rahul, and asks him to promise that he and Menaka will live happily together. Finally, having Rahul promise, Parami boards the train and leaves, as Menaka and Rahul watch. In an ending monologue, Parami illustrates that Prarthana was the lifestory of her love, and not the lovestory of her life.

== Cast ==
- Nethmi Roshel as Parami
- Rahul Warawitage as Rahul
- Shanudrie Priyasad as Menaka
- Mihirangi Hettiarachchi as Madhu
- Nimesh Weeranga as Saliya
- Pavithra Vanniarachchi as Mrs Seneviratne
- Chandana Rajarathne as Mr Seneviratne
- Anoma Wickramaarachchi as Mrs Gajanayake
- Krishantha Mendis as Mr Gajanayake
- Donovan Arunasalam as Donny
- Gayathri Rasingolla as Shakila
- Yashodha Medagedara
- Yurandi de Zoysa
- Ayesh Perera
- Priyanka Priyadarshani
- Milton Sebastian
- Harindi De Zoysa
- Hemantha Rathnasena

== Production ==
=== Development ===
Wasawa Baduge and Yasas Medagedara, having worked together on numerous occasions, shared a passion to expand their work in the music industry to the cinema industry. Baduge, who had conceived an idea for Adaraneeya Prarthana in as early as 2016 but had placed the movie in development hell, revived it in 2020, with the aid of Medagedara, and Harindi D Soysa, who is also the choreographer of the film. Casting of the lead actors was confirmed by early 2020, with Shanudrie Priyasad as Menaka, debutante Nethmi Roshel as Parami, and debutante Rahul Warawitage as Rahul. The movie is presented by Bluesky Productions with Midhouse Studios.

=== Filming ===
Principal photography began in mid-2020, and wrapped by the end of the same year. Filming of the song "Madhurabhani" was planned to be done in Australia; however, opposed by the pandemic regulations, the song was shot in Sri Lanka, with visual effects being used to recreate the foreign landscapes.

== Release and Box Office ==
Adaraneeya Prarthana premiered in Alberta, Canada on 27 August 2022, opening up to record-breaking sales on Day 1. Distributed by MegaLive Events, the film screened throughout Canada, surpassing a record-breaking 60 screenings. Following the release of the movie in Canada, the movie premiered in Australia on 23 October 2022, opening to several houseful screenings. Likewise, Adaraneeya Prarthana held its Sri Lankan Grand Premiere on 4 November 2022, at the PVR multiplex in One Galle Face, with the simultaneous release of the movie in several cinemas islandwide. The event was attended by popular celebrities of the Sri Lankan Media Industry. The release of the movie witnessed the first time in which nearly all the available shows across the country reached houseful status in recent Sri Lankan cinematic history, with over 16 houseful screenings being recorded islandwide by the first few days. This was noted as a remarkable achievement in light of the economic crisis prevalent in Sri Lanka at the time by renown Sri Lankan auteur, Vimukthi Jayasundara. In addition, the film set the record for the highest box office in the lowest period of time and number of theatres, generating over Rs. 10.2 million over the first 9 days of screening in Sri Lanka. By the end of the first 16 days of screening in Sri Lanka, Adaraneeya Prarthana had accumulated over Rs. 20.2 million, setting the record for the highest box office through limited theatres in a short period of time in Sri Lankan cinematic history. With the culmination of a successful 40-day run in Sri Lanka, Adaraneeya Prarthana was recognised as one of the highest grossing Sinhalese films for garnering over Rs. 42 million at the box office, with the PVR Cinemas at One Galle Face contributing to over Rs. 18 million, which is currently its highest box office collection for a Sinhala-language feature film since its inception.

Furthermore, the film premiered in the United States on 4 November 2022, becoming the first Sinhala-language movie to premiere in the US, and premiered in Tokyo, Japan on 20 November. After a successful theatrical run of 77 days in Sri Lanka, the movie departed from Sri Lankan cinemas on 19 January 2023, even though it was extended to 21 January in selected theatres upon popular demand. Adaraneeya Prarthana premiered in New Zealand on 5 February 2023.

== Reception ==
Adaraneeya Prarthana has received critical acclaim for breaking the stereotype of young romance, and is remarkably the largest distribution of a Sinhala-language movie overseas. Moreover, it has been applauded as a "breath of fresh air" by prominent Sri Lankan musician and singer, Santhush Weeraman, and has been remarked as a revolutionary turning point in the Sri Lankan Film Industry.

"Superb! Superb movie. This is the first time I have cried like this for a sinhala movie, ever," stated popular Sri Lankan actress and former politician, Upeksha Swarnamali, at the Sri Lankan Grand Premiere. In addition, prominent Sri Lankan film director, Chandran Rutnam, added "They did a tremendous job, and kept me entertained". Moreover, a critic regarded the movie a "dream of romanticism", commending the impressive performances of the debut cast.

== Soundtrack ==
The film features seven songs. The songs were released prior to the premiere of the movie, and was met with critical acclaim, with critics regarding the soundtrack as "impeccable", and praising composer Yasas Medagedara.

No.	Title	Lyrics	Singer(s)	Length
1.	"Seethala Sulange (Sinhala: සීතල සුළඟේ)"	Ayodhya Fernando	Yashodha Medagedara	4:16
2.	"Madhurabhani (Sinhala: මධුරභාණී)"	Shehan Galahitiyawa	Yasas Medagedara	4:03
3.	"Sewwandi Paya (Sinhala: සෙව්වන්දි පායා)"	Shehan Galahitiyawa	Bathiya N Santhush	5:30
4.	"Therunado Visal Adare (Sinhala: තේරුනාදෝ විසල් ආදරේ)"	Shehan Galahitiyawa	Yasas Medagedara	5:29
5.	"Mal Siththam (Sinhala : මල් සිත්තම්)"	Shehan Galahitiyawa	Yasas Medagedara, Yashodha Medagedara	3:41
6.	"Saumyawantha Re (Sinhala : සෞම්‍යවන්ත රෑ)"	Shehan Galahitiyawa	Shanika Madumali	4:38
7.	"Senehas Aware (Sinhala : සෙනෙහස් අවාරේ)"	Sajith Akmeemana	Supun Perera	4:09

== Awards and nominations ==
Award	Date of ceremony	Category	Recipient(s)	Result
Derana Lux Film Awards	9 September 2023	Best Actress in a Leading Role	Nethmi Roshel	Nominated
Derana Lux Film Awards	9 September 2023	Best Direction	Wasawa Baduge	Nominated
Derana Lux Film Awards	9 September 2023	Best Original Music Score	Yasas Medagedara	Nominated
Derana Lux Film Awards	9 September 2023	Best Screenplay	Wasawa Baduge Malindu Gajadheera Ranganath Weerasinghe	Nominated
Derana Lux Film Awards	9 September 2023	Popular Actor	Rahul Warawitage	Nominated
Derana Lux Film Awards	9 September 2023	Popular Actress	Shanudrie Priyasad	Nominated
Derana Lux Film Awards	9 September 2023	Popular Actress	Nethmi Roshel	Nominated
Derana Lux Film Awards	9 September 2023	Popular Choreographer	Harindi De Zoysa	Nominated
Derana Lux Film Awards	9 September 2023	Popular Actor in a Comedy Role	Donovan Arunasalam	Nominated
Derana Lux Film Awards	9 September 2023	Popular Song	Mal Siththam	Nominated
Derana Lux Film Awards	9 September 2023	Popular Song	Sewwandi Paya	Won
Derana Lux Film Awards	9 September 2023	Popular Song	Saumyawantha Re	Nominated
Derana Lux Film Awards	9 September 2023	Popular Song	Therunado Wisal Adare	Nominated
