= Nethmi Roshel =

Sri Lankan actress and model

Nethmi Roshel Rogers
- නෙත්මි රොශෙල්
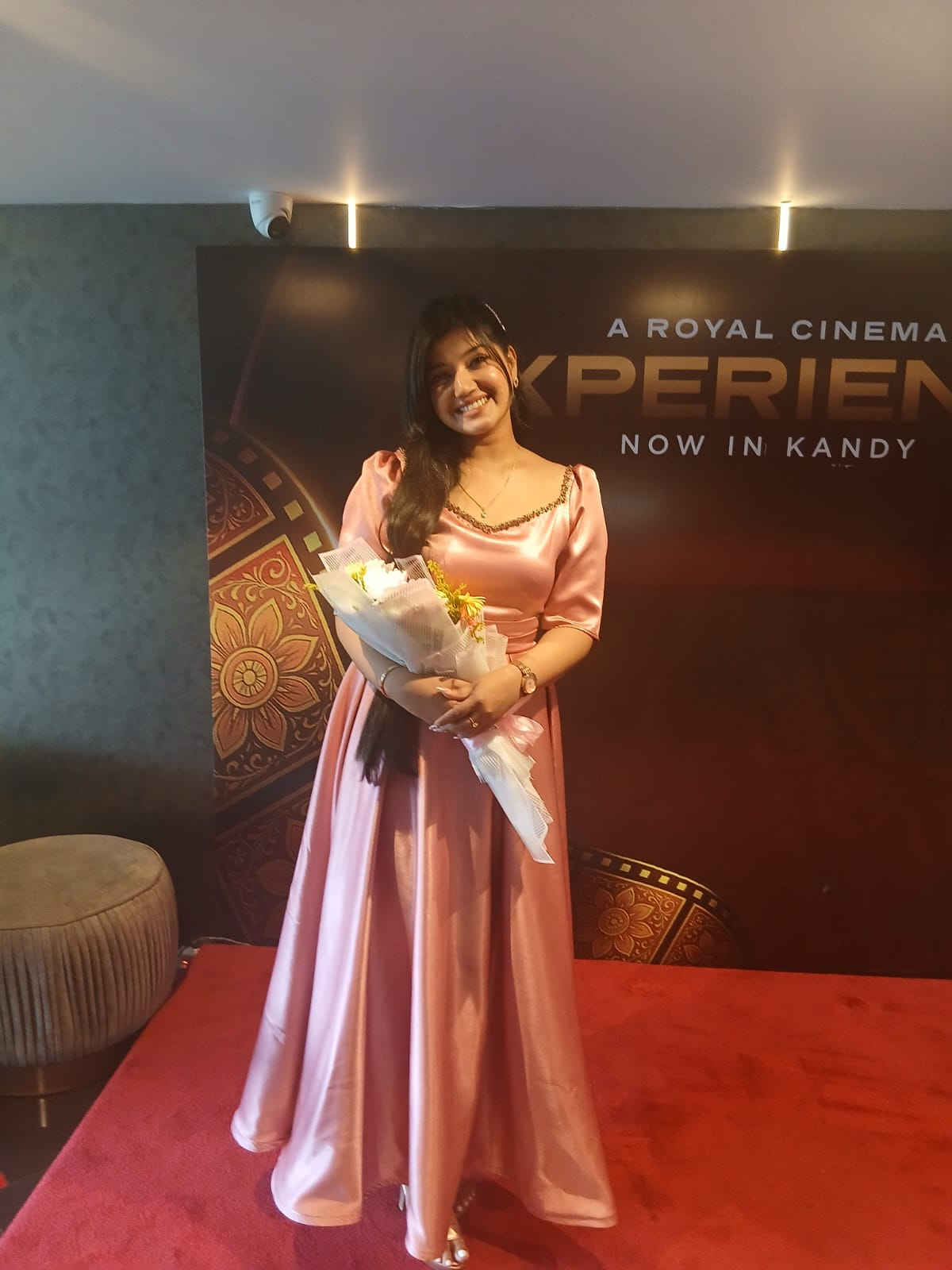
- Roshel in 2026
- Born: Nethmi Nisheka Roshel Rogers; 6 November 1998 (age 28); Colombo, Sri Lanka
- Education: University of Sri Jayewardenepura
- Occupations: Actress; Model; TV Presenter
- Years active: 2019–present
- Known for: Deweni Inima; Adaraneeya Prarthana Paaradeese

Nethmi Nisheka Roshel Rogers (born 6 November 1998) (Sinhala: නෙත්මි නිෂේකා රොශෙල් රොජර්ස්) popularly known as Nethmi Roshel, is a Sri Lankan actress and model. Her first television appearance was on the teledrama Sakkaran followed by her role as Aksha on Deweni Inima, which thrust her into public attention. Her first film appearance was as Parami in Adaraneeya Prarthana, which released both internationally and domestically in 2022, opening to positive reviews from critics.

== Early life ==
Nethmi Nisheka Roshel Rogers was born on 6 November 1998 in Colombo, Sri Lanka. The eldest with two younger siblings, she attended Bomiriya Central College, and following her graduation, the University of Sri Jayewardenepura. In 2019, she won first place in Jathika Rupavahini Awurudu Kumariya, and was entitled "Miss Photogenic 2019".

Currently, while pursuing her higher education, she works as an actress, model, and a brand ambassador.

== Career ==
In addition to her television and film ventures, Rogers has worked as a model for several promotional photoshoots, and is a brand ambassador for brands such as Tecno Camon, and Nescafé.

=== Television ===
Her debut in television was as 'Jayawathi' on the teledrama Sakkaran, which aired on Sirasa TV. Her gradual rise to popularity led her to the role of Aksha on the television soap opera Deweni Inima. Similarly, she has enacted roles in the teledramas Hiru Awidin, and Rawana (season 2).

In May 2023, Rogers is set to star as Gauri in the romance melodrama Rosa alongside Randika Gunatilake, which will air on TV Derana.

=== Film ===
Her mainstream film debut is as "Parami" on the Sri Lankan romance movie, Adaraneeya Prarthana, which was released in 2022 in Sri Lanka, US, Australia, Canada, UAE, and Japan. The film received critical acclaim for its refreshing take on young modern romance, with critics praising the performances, soundtrack, and cinematography of the movie. Furthermore, in December 2021, she ventured into the genre of short film, by starring in Cherry Blossom directed by Jo Dissanayake. Similarly, in April 2022, she starred as the vivacious, and arrogant Kata-malee in the Avurudu telefilm Wasanthe, which aired on TV Derana.

Rogers starred in the lead role of "Warsha" in the telefilm Adara Wasanthe opposite costars Lavan Abhishek and Akila Dhanuddara, which was released on New Year's Eve, 2023. Furthermore, the muhurath ceremony for her next mainstream movie, Kambili, was held on 28 March 2023. At the Derana Lux Film Awards 2023 held on 9 September 2023, Roshel received her first nomination for the Best Actress in a Leading Role for Adaraneeya Prarthana and a nomination for the 'Popular Actress'.

In 2026, Rogers starred in the film Eda Ra, as the lead role of "Swarna" along with Roshan Ravindra, Senali Fonseka and Sheshadri Priyasad.

== Personal life ==
Rogers is an avid pet lover, and often advocates the better treatment of animals on social media. She was a contributor to the "Feed A Child" programme that was organised by TV Derana on its 17th anniversary, and has spoken about the pressures that Sri Lankan children face in light of the current economic crisis.

== Filmography ==
=== Television ===
Year	Teledrama	Role	Ref.
2019	Sakkaran	Jayaneeta / Jayawathi	
2019	Deweni Inima	Aksha	
2020	Hiru Awidin	Ashanthi	
2020	Rawana (season 2)	Suparnika	
2023	Rosa	Gaury	
2023	Nikini kusum	Aalya	
2024	Paaradeese	Paarami	
2025	Tharu Adare	Yehansa	
2025	Backside		
2026	Sonu Mandara	Mandara	
TBD	Hathweni Manali		

=== Film ===
Year	Title	Role	Note(s)	Ref.
2021	Cherry Blossoms	Rashi	Short film	
2022	Wasanthe	Kata-malee	Telefilm	
2022	Adaraneeya Prarthana	Parami	Lead role	
2023	Adara Wasanthe	Warsha	Telefilm	
2023	Kambili	Samadhi	Lead role	
2025	Memory		Youtube film	
2026	Udavu Wasanthaya		Telefilm	
2026	Kalpana	Kalpana		
2026	Eda Raa	Swarna		
TBA	Mandolin	Minoli		
TBA	Supem Sulagak			

=== Music videos ===
Year	Title	Artist(s)
2019	"Me Adare"	Dulakshana Achintha
2020	"Ma Mekala"	Chandana Liyanaarachchi
2021	"Divyangana"	Gihan Vithanage
2021	"Yan"	Gayan Gunawardana
2021	"Sudu Muhuna"	Lavan Abhishek
2021	"Welemin Ma"	Nerron Perera ft Subhani Harshani
2022	"Pabalu Haadu"	Akash Sachinthana ft Yuki Navaratne
2022	"Hitha Kiri Gehune"	Deelaka Chamith
2022	"Hadakari Naari"	Dinesh Gamage ft Kaizer Kaiz
2022	"Mata Oya Mage Pana Wage"	Sameera Weerawarma ft Kavindya Adikari
2022	"Kalawakin"	Vishwa Jayasinghe
2023	"Shobana"	Dilmin Perera

== Awards and nominations ==
=== The 9th Derana Lux Film Awards 2024 ===
Year	Category	Result
2023	Best Actress in a Leading Role	Nominated
2023	Popular Actress	Nominated

=== SLIM Kantar People's Awards 2025 ===
Year	Category	Result
2025	Tele-drama Actress of the Year	Won
2025	Youth Choice Actress of the Year	Won
