= Kabaddi Kabaddi =

Kabaddi Kabaddi may refer to

- Kabaddi, a contact team sport and its chant
- Kabadi Kabadi (2001 film), 2001 Indian Tamil-language film
- Kabaddi Kabaddi (2003 film), 2003 Indian Telugu-language film
- Kabadi Kabadi (2008 film), 2008 Indian Malayalam-language film
- Kabaddi Kabaddi (2015 film), 2015 Nepalese film

== See also ==
- Kabaddi (disambiguation)
