= FM Derana =

FM DERANA
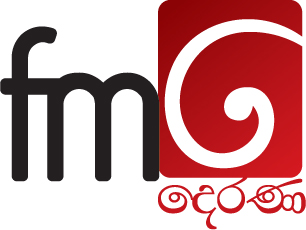
- Sri Lanka
- Frequencies: 92.2 MHz Kikiliyamana, Nayabedda, Ratnapura, Jaffna; 92.4 MHz Colombo, Gongala, Hanthana, Gammaduwa

Programming
- Language: Sinhala

Ownership
- Owner: Derana Macro Entertainment under Dilith Jayaweera

History
- First air date: 29 March 2009

Links
- Website: www.fmderana.lk

FM Derana is a free-to-air Sinhala radio channel in Sri Lanka. Established in March 2009, FM Derana broadcasts 24 hours a day and covers over 95% of the island. Designed to appeal to a broad cross-section of listeners, FM Derana leverages the strength and success of TV Derana. This strategic consolidation aims to revolutionize the media landscape with a simple yet entertaining format.

Currently, FM Derana holds the No. 1 position among all radio channels in Sri Lanka. The channel has maintained this top position for the past three years in a row, achieving this status just eight years after its inception. There are 37 radio channels currently operating in Sri Lanka, with 30 broadcasting in the Sinhala language. In total, there are a little over 50 local radio channels in operation in the country.

== History ==
FM Derana is a Sinhala language FM radio channel launched on 29 March 2009 extending the promise of "Embracing novelty while upholding values" ("අපේ දේ රැකගෙන අලුත් දේ අරගෙන") to the Sri Lankan radio industry.

== Sports ==
=== 2011 ICC Cricket World Cup ===
FM Derana was the official Sri Lankan radio broadcaster of the 2011 Cricket World Cup, which was held from 19 February 2011 to 2 April 2011.

=== 2026 ICC Men's T20 World Cup ===
FM Derana was the official Sri Lankan radio broadcaster of the 2026 Men's T20 World Cup, which was held from 7 February 2026 to 8 March 2026.

== Frequencies ==
- 92.2 & 92.4

== Popular programs on Fm Derana ==
- Anupma
- Derana chart show
- Apinodanna Radio
- Chooti Malli Podi Malli
- Pirith
- Ada Derana News bulletin
- Apoorva
- FM Derana Attack show

== See also ==
- List of 2011 Cricket World Cup broadcasting rights
