= Kabaddi (2021 film) =

2021 Sri Lankan film

- Directed by: Harsha Udakanda
- Written by: Harsha Udakanda
- Produced by: HU Films
- Starring: Amila Karunanayake; Senali Fonseka; Sriyantha Mendis; Darshan Dharmaraj
- Cinematography: Janith Gunasekara
- Edited by: Thivanka Amarasiri
- Music by: Udara Samarawickrama
- Distributed by: Rithma Theaters
- Release date: 16 April 2021
- Country: Sri Lanka
- Language: Sinhala

Kabaddi is a 2021 Sri Lankan sports action film directed by Harsha Udakanda and produced by Nishantha Jayawardena for HU Films and Hiruna Creations. It stars Amila Karunanayake and Senali Fonseka in lead roles along with Sriyantha Mendis, Darshan Dharmaraj, and Nilmini Kottegoda in supporting roles.

The film had its premiere on 16 April 2021. The film is a remake of 2003 Indian Telugu language film Okkadu.

== Cast ==
- Amila Karunanayake as Manuranga
- Senali Fonseka as Malithi
- Sriyantha Mendis as Manuranga's father Inspector Nagahawaththa
- Darshan Dharmaraj as Dharmaraj, Chandra's brother
- Damitha Abeyratne as Minister Chandra Nilaweera
- Anuj Ranasinghe as Sathsara Anuj, Malithi's younger brother
- Piumi Boteju as Sulochana, Manuranga's sister
- Nilmini Kottegoda as Mrs. Malini Nagahawaththa, Manuranga's mother
- Vinu Siriwardena as Manuranga's cousin sister
- Rajitha Hiran as Manuranga's friend
- Gayan Mapalagama as Gayan, Malithi's elder brother
- Ananda Wickramage as Mr. Mapalagama, Malithi's father
- Kumari Munasinghe as Mrs. Mapalagama, Malithi's mother
- Mahinda Ihalagama as Ihalagama, Dharmaraj's henchman
- Chathura Perera as Manuranga's friend
- Sugath Janaka as Manuranga's kabaddi team friend
- Menaka Arumapura as Manuranga's kabaddi team friend
- Gayan Kanchana as Manuranga's kabaddi team friend
- Manjula Senanayake as Manuranga's kabaddi team friend
- Ryan Van Rooyen as Kabaddi referee

== Soundtrack ==
The film consists of three songs. The song "Yamu Piyamba" is based on "Sha La La" from Ghilli (2004).

| No | Song | Composer(s) | Writer(s) | Co-singer(s) | Ref |
| 01 | Heeneka Paya | Hashan Chandima Ilangakoon | Gihan Anushka Ilangakoon | Nuwandhika Senarathne, Amal Perera | |
| 02 | Maruthaye | Udara Samaraweera | Harsha Udakanda | Ayomi Perera, Vinod Alwis | |
| 03 | Yamu Piyamba | Udara Samaraweera | Harsha Udakanda | Uresha Ravihari | |
