= Suneera Sumanga Dias =

Sri Lankan singer and musician (born 1997)

- සුනීර සුමංග ඩයස්
- Born: Subasinghe Nishshanka Suneera Sumanga Dias; 8 May 1997 (age 29); Ragama, Sri Lanka
- Education: De Mazenod College
- Occupations: Singer, musician
- Spouse: Tharushika Devduni (m. 2024)
- Parents: Yoga Dias (father); Sunethra Perera (mother)
- Website: http://suneerasumanga.com Musical career
- Genres: Pop; soul; rhythm and blues; Indian classical music
- Instrument: Vocals
- Years active: 2017–present
- Labels: Nilwala; Ransilu; Evoke

Subasinghe Nishshanka Suneera Sumanga Dias (Sinhala: සුනීර සුමංග ඩයස්: born 8 May 1997), popularly known as Suneera Sumanga, is a Sri Lankan singer and musician. He is the winner of the seventh season of singing reality competition Derana Dream Star. Apart from that, he is also the founder and lead vocalist of live band called "Vayana".

== Early life ==
Suneera was born on 8 May 1997 in Polgahahena village, Ragama, Sri Lanka as the eldest of the family. He completed education from De Mazenod College, Kandana. His father Yoga Dias and mother Sunethra Perera are both catholic devotees. Both of them were regular members of the choir of the village church. He has one younger sister.

He is married to his longtime partner Tharushika Devduni, where the wedding was celebrated on 14 December 2024 at Ragama Peter Paul Church.

== Music life ==
He easily won the first place in all the singing competitions held at the school from grade four to GCE Ordinary Level. After finishing Advanced Level, he enrolled in Audio Engineering Diploma course. In 2015, Suneera won the division of Ghazal style senor solo vocal in All Island Inter-School Music competition and in the next year of the competition, he won the division of Thumri style senior solo vocal. During the weekends and school holidays, the band Fire Rock sang together.

In 2017 he sent an application to the seventh season of singing reality competition Derana Dream Star under the guidance of his aunty and two older cousin brothers. During the competition, he sang many classical songs of his idol W.D. Amaradeva such as; Ipida Mare, Kumariyaka Paa Salamba, Saraswathi Devi, and Etha Kadukara Himavu. Eventually, he became the winner of the season during the grand finale held on 9 December 2017 at the Sugathadasa Indoor Stadium. In the meantime, he became an A-grade singer at Sri Lanka Broadcasting Corporation (SLBC).

In 2018, he released his first solo "Santhana Susum" which was based on Peradeniya University. Since then he released many solo tracks such as "Mama Ohomai Hamadamath", "Nawum Sanda Awith", "Pale Pol Athu", and "Mini Otunu". In 2020, he sang a tribute song "Parama Amara Guru" to pay homage to Pandit Amaradeva which was released on the occasion of the third commemoration of Pandith Amaradeva in November. In the same year, he joined with the charity song "Muhuda Debe Karana" to strengthen the life during the COVID-19 pandemic time.
