= Lumbini College =

Lumbini College (Sinhala ලුම්බිණි විද්‍යාලය) or Lumbini Vidyalaya is a Sinhalese mixed school located in Colombo, Sri Lanka. Founded in 1929, the school was named as a national school in 2009.

== History ==
Lumbini College was established on 18 February 1929, as the Havelock Town Junior Mixed School, with 114 students. Although the school was a mixed school, only girls had attended. The staff consisted of the principal, D. R. Balasooriya, and three teachers. There was just a single building built from wooden planks.

The school was originally situated in Skelton Road, Colombo. In 2010 the primary school section was moved to a location in Wellawatte as a result of growth in enrolments, merging with Wallawatta Maha Vidyalaya, which was renamed Lumbini College. The school's secondary classes have remained at the original location.

On 2 June 2014 the President Mahinda Rajapaksa formally opened the school’s sports complex, which contains with a gym, tennis courts and sporting facilities.

== Past headmasters and principals ==
1. D. R. Balasooriya (1929–1932)
2. H. R. M. Kaluarachi (1934)
3. D. S. Dissanayaka (1934–1941)
4. D. J. Gunasingha (1938–1941)
5. Wijesuriya (1941–1944)
6. W. H. Pranandu (1944–1947)
7. D. K. Jayawardana (1947–1949)
8. D. J. Dias (1949–1951)
9. Capt. V.W. Halpe + A. W. Alvis (1951–1959)
10. J. M. Kurupu (1959–1962)
11. A. D. Sirisana (1962)
12. J. S. H. Jasan (1962–1969)
13. G. S. Weerasena (1969–1976)
14. L. H. Edirisingha (1976–1979)
15. W. P. A. Perera (1979–1991)
16. G. Gunawardana (1991–1992)
17. G. Leyanaga (1992–1999)
18. J. G. Amarajeewa (1999–2010)
19. Chandranath Amarathunga (2010–2012)
20. Oshara Panditarathna (2012–2016)
21. K. G. Wimalasena (2016 – 2019)
22. A.W. Nanayakkara (2019-2021)
23. Priyantha Karunarathna (2021-2022)
24. Sarath Gunathilaka (2022–2025)
25. Geetha Priyadarshani (2025-present)

== Alumni ==
The school's alumni are known as Old Lumbiniyanas.

=== Notable alumni ===
Name	Notability	Reference
Anura Srinath	Painter	
Mohammed Aslam	Cricketer	
Bandula Gunawardane	Member of Parliament – Colombo (1989–1994, 2000–present)	
Lalith Jayasinghe	Lieutenant Colonel Sri Lanka Army Special Forces	
Lionel Ranwala	Musician, dramatist	
Nihal Fernando	Actor, dramatist	
Vikum Sanjaya	Twenty20 International Cricketer (2017–present)	
Madhava Wijesinghe	Actor, television presenter (1993–present)	
