= Narammala =

Town in North Western Province, Sri Lanka

Narammala නාරම්මල நாரம்மல
- Town
- Location within Sri Lanka
- Coordinates: 7°26′4″N 80°13′17″E
- Country: Sri Lanka
- Province: North Western Province
- District: Kurunegala District

Government
  - Type: Pradeshiya Sabha
  - President: H. P. M. Parakrama Sampath Thilakarathne (Sri Lanka Podujana Peramuna)

Area
  - Town: 99.68 km^{2} (38.49 sq mi)
  - Land: 91 km^{2} (35 sq mi)
  - Water: 34 km^{2} (13 sq mi)
- Highest elevation: 163 m (535 ft)
- Lowest elevation: 0 m (0 ft)

Population (2012)
  - Town: 56,279
  - Rank: 14th in Kurunegala District
  - Density: 493.7/km^{2} (1,279/sq mi)
  - Urban: 7,513
  - Rural: 48,766
- Time zone: UTC+5:30 (Sri Lanka Standard Time Zone)
- Postal Code: 60100
- Area code: +37

Narammala (Sinhala: නාරම්මල, romanized: Nārammala, Tamil: நாரம்மல, romanized: Nāram'mala), is a town in Sri Lanka. It is in the centre of the North Western Province.

According to the 2012 census, the population of Narammala is 56,279, with an urban population of 7,513 and a rural population of 48,766. The town's main exports are textiles and ready-made garments.

== Climate ==
Climate data for Narammala, Sri Lanka (1961–1990)
Month	Jan	Feb	Mar	Apr	May	Jun	Jul	Aug	Sep	Oct	Nov	Dec	Year
Record high °C (°F)	35.6 (96.1)	37.6 (99.7)	39.2 (102.6)	39.0 (102.2)	37.7 (99.9)	35.5 (95.9)	35.3 (95.5)	35.7 (96.3)	37.2 (99.0)	36.7 (98.1)	34.0 (93.2)	39.0 (102.2)	39.2 (102.6)
Mean daily maximum °C (°F)	30.8 (87.4)	33.1 (91.6)	34.5 (94.1)	33.5 (92.3)	32.2 (90.0)	31.0 (87.8)	30.8 (87.4)	31.1 (88.0)	31.5 (88.7)	31.3 (88.3)	30.9 (87.6)	30.1 (86.2)	31.7 (89.1)
Daily mean °C (°F)	25.7 (78.3)	27.0 (80.6)	28.4 (83.1)	28.6 (83.5)	28.3 (82.9)	27.6 (81.7)	27.3 (81.1)	27.4 (81.3)	27.5 (81.5)	27.0 (80.6)	26.5 (79.7)	25.9 (78.6)	27.3 (81.1)
Mean daily minimum °C (°F)	20.7 (69.3)	20.9 (69.6)	22.4 (72.3)	23.6 (74.5)	24.4 (75.9)	24.2 (75.6)	23.9 (75.0)	23.8 (74.8)	23.5 (74.3)	22.8 (73.0)	22.1 (71.8)	21.7 (71.1)	22.8 (73.0)
Record low °C (°F)	14.6 (58.3)	14.7 (58.5)	16.2 (61.2)	20.4 (68.7)	20.3 (68.5)	20.8 (69.4)	20.2 (68.4)	19.4 (66.9)	19.2 (66.6)	18.3 (64.9)	15.7 (60.3)	14.8 (58.6)	14.6 (58.3)
Average precipitation mm (inches)	62 (2.4)	92 (3.6)	138 (5.4)	262 (10.3)	194 (7.6)	156 (6.1)	114 (4.5)	93 (3.7)	159 (6.3)	359 (14.1)	327 (12.9)	139 (5.5)	2,095 (82.5)
Average relative humidity (%) (at Daytime)	65	59	60	69	73	74	73	71	71	74	74	72	69.6
Source: NOAA

== Religion ==
Religion in Narammala (2012)
1. Buddhism (80.9%)
2. Islam (12.0%)
3. Hinduism (4.10%)
4. Christianity (3.20%)
5. Other (0.00%)

The majority of residents in Narammala are Buddhists.
