= TV Derana =

Sri Lankan television network

TV Derana TV දෙරණ
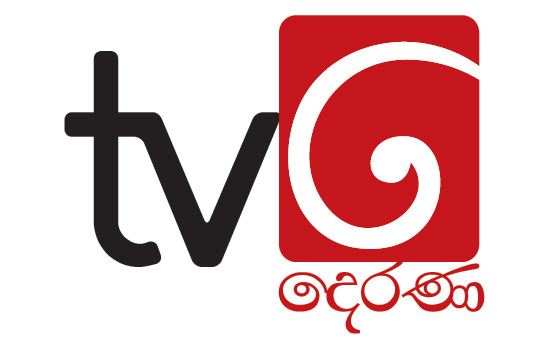
- Country: Sri Lanka

Programming
- Language: Sinhalese
- Picture format: 1080i HDTV; 576i SD

Ownership
- Owner: Power House LTD
- Sister channels: Ada Derana 24; FM Derana

History
- Launched: 11 October 2005

Links
- Website: www.derana.lk

Availability

Terrestrial
- UHF (Colombo): Channel 37
- UHF (Kandy): Channel 32
- UHF (Nayabedda) (FTA): Channel 32
- UHF (Badulla): Channel 31
- UHF (Gongala): Channel 31
- UHF (Ratnapura): Channel 30
- UHF (Nuwara Eliya): Channel 36
- UHF (Kalutara): Channel 56

TV Derana (Sinhala: TV දෙරණ) a Sri Lankan private entertainment terrestrial television channel. Launched on 11 October 2005, it is one of the most popular television networks in the country. Its main transmission tower is on the Kikilimana mountain, and coverage is extended nationwide via eight transmission towers.

The channel is available on digital medium through Dialog TV, PEO TV, Freesat and the OTT platform Derana Plus (revamp of 'DFlix', which itself was revamp of 'Gluuoo'). TV Derana notably broadcasts contemporary content and has the motto "අපේ දේ රැකගෙන, අලුත් දේ අරගෙන" (apē dē rækagena, alut dē aragena), lit. 'Conserve what is our own and embrace the new'.

The channel focuses viewers in the two premium socio-economic categorizations SEC A and SEC B. TV Derana is the No. 1 television channel in Sri Lanka, according to late 2021 LMRB search data. The channel has maintained this position since March 2017.

TV Derana won 47 awards at the Sri Lanka Institute of Marketing Nielsen People's Awards 2020 including the "Television Channel of the Year", "Peoples Youth Choice Television Channel of the Year". TV Derana won these awards at the previous year as well including the biggest award ‘The Local Brand of the year”.

TV Derana also holds the all-time record for having the most programmes by one channel, in the top 10 most rated programmes. According to the recent LMRB research data, TV Derana has eight programmes in the top 10 including the first two programmes in the country.

In October 2014, TV Derana was appointed the first and only Multi Channel Network (MCN) of YouTube in Sri Lanka.

TV Derana became the first channel in Sri Lanka to reach one million subscribers and one billion total views in 2019.

== Ada Derana ==
"Ada Derana" is TV Derana's news flagship brand and currently is the no 1 news provider in Sri Lanka. Ada Derana news websites operated by Derana. Its content is available in English, Sinhala and Tamil. It is ranked as one of the most popular local news websites by Alexa.

In late 2007, Ada Derana entered into a partnership with Dialog Telekom, a major mobile services operator in Sri Lanka, to send breaking news alerts to all Dialog mobile subscribers as text messages.

== Ada Derana TV ==
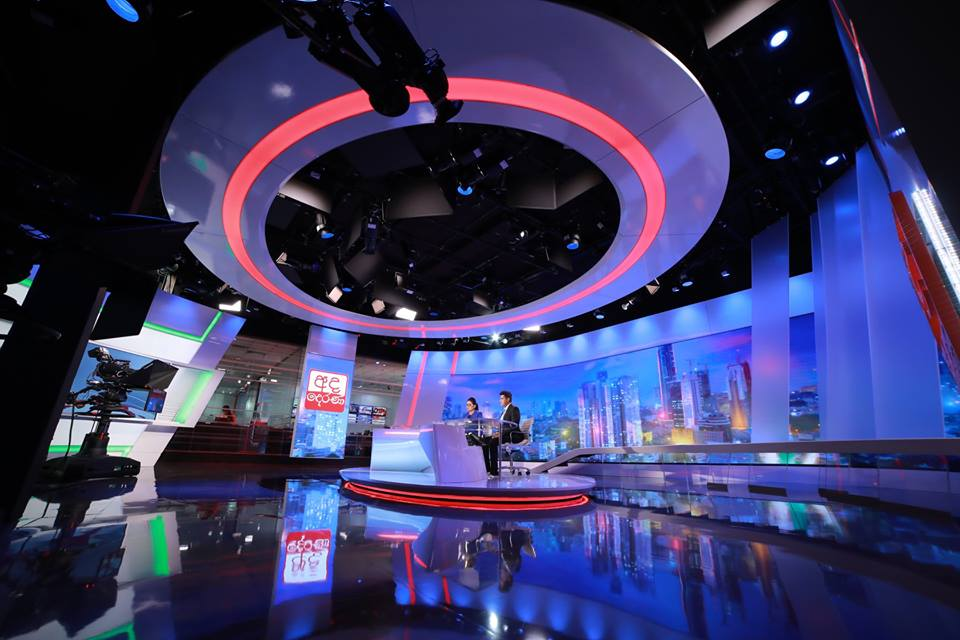
Ada Derana - Studio 24

Ada Derana TV is Sri Lanka's first ever 24-hour television news channel and first dedicated news channel. The channel is available on Satellite and cable television.

== Programming ==
The channel broadcasts a range of entertainment programmes including dramas, reality shows, kids programmes, music and variety shows. It operates 16 hours a day, between 05:00 and 24:00.

== Competitions and sponsorship ==
Derana has hosted the Miss World Miss Sri Lanka pageant since 2007.

Derana has conducted the Derana London Star since May 2008 in London, UK, to find the most talented upcoming singer among the Sri Lankans living in UK. The first edition received around 220 applications, and auditions were broadcast in Sri Lanka by Derana TV. The winners were determined by a panel of judges and public votes via SMS.

TV Derana is the first channel that hosted a reality show for children in Sri Lanka. The first season was named as Derana Star in a Minute and the rest of the seasons as Derana Little Star. Up to date, nine seasons of Little Star were finished and the grand finale of tenth season was held on 27 June 2020.

== See also ==
- Nuwandhika Senarathne
- Madhava Wijesinghe
- Sachini Nipunsala
- Shehani Kahandawala
- Janeeth Rodrigo
