= Kanchanpur =

Kanchanpur may refer to:

- Kanchanpur, Bihar, Bihta, Bihar, India
- Kanchanpur, Gujarat, India
- Kanchanpur, North Tripura, North Tripura, India
- Kanchanpur, Rohtas, India
- Kanchanpur, Bankura, West Bengal, India
- Kanchanpur, Unnao, a village in Uttar Pradesh, India
- Kanchanpur District, Nepal
- Kanchanpur Union, a Union council of Basail Upazila, Bangladesh
- Kanchanpur Assembly constituency, Tripura, India

== See also ==
- Kanchanaburi (disambiguation)
- Kanchan (disambiguation)
- Puri (disambiguation)
- Kanchanrup, Nepal
