= Muni =

Muni or Munni may refer to:

== Municipal ==
- A common US abbreviation for municipal, municipal services, and the like
- Municipal bond
- Municipal Bridge, the former name of the George Rogers Clark Memorial Bridge in Louisville, Kentucky
- "Muni", slang for a municipally owned and operated golf course
- The Muny, an outdoor musical theatre in St. Louis, Missouri
- Cleveland Public Power, known as Muny Light before 1983
- San Francisco Municipal Railway, the public transit agency for San Francisco, California
- Springfield Municipal Opera in Springfield, Illinois
- Muni Metro in San Francisco

== People ==
Surname

- Craig Muni (born 1962), former professional ice hockey player
- Ganapati Muni (1878–1936), Indian philosopher
- Marguerite Muni (1929–1999), French actress sometimes credited as simply Muni
- Paul Muni (1895–1967), American actor
- Scott Muni (1930–2004), American disc jockey

Given name

- Munni Begum (disambiguation)
- Muni "Lily" He (born 1999), Chinese professional golfer
- Muni Long (Priscilla Renea Hamilton; born 1988), American singer-songwriter

=== Fictional characters ===
- Munni, child mute character from film Bajrangi Bhaijaan
- Munni, item number character from item number Munni Badnaam Hui in the film Dabangg, portrayed by Malaika Arora

== Other uses ==
- An abbreviation for mountain unicycling
- Muni (film series), an Indian Tamil-language horror comedy film series by Raghava Lawrence
  - Muni (film), 2007 film, the first part of the series
  - Muni 2 or Kanchana, 2011 sequel film, second part of the series
  - Muni 3 or Kanchana 2, 2015 film, third part of the series
  - Muni 4 or Kanchana 3, 2019 film, fourth part of the series
- Muni River, a river in Equatorial Guinea
- Munni River, a river in Russia
- Muni Village, Arua District, Uganda
- Río Muni, the continental region of Equatorial Guinea, named after the river Muni
- Masaryk University (muni.cz), in Brno, Czech Republic
- Munisuvrata, 20th Jain Tirthankara
- Rishi Muni, an ascetic who engages himself in devotion with silence
- Jain Muni, a Jain monk
- Muni (Hinduism), woman in mythology
- Muni (restaurant), in Seoul, South Korea
- Muni (saint)

== See also ==
- Kanchana (disambiguation)
- Munimuni, a Filipino indie folk band
- "Muny", a song by Trinidadian rapper Nicki Minaj from her 2011 album Pink Friday
