= Asai Man Piyabanna =

- Sinhala: ආසයි මං පියාඹන්න
- Directed by: Udayakantha Warnasuriya
- Written by: Udayakantha Warnasuriya
- Produced by: Alankulama Films
- Starring: Roshan Ranawana; Pooja Umashankar; Sanath Gunathilake
- Cinematography: Jayanath Gunawardhane
- Edited by: Ajith Ramanayake
- Music by: Rohana Weerasinghe
- Release date: 1 November 2007
- Running time: 173 minutes
- Country: Sri Lanka
- Language: Sinhala

Asai Man Piyabanna (Sinhala: ආසයි මං පියාඹන්න; transl. I like to fly) is a 2007 Sri Lankan Sinhala musical romantic film directed by Udayakantha Warnasuriya and produced by Dhammika Siriwardana for Alankulama Films. It stars Roshan Ranawana and Pooja Umashankar in lead roles along with Sanath Gunathilake and Upeksha Swarnamali. The music is composed by Rohana Weerasinghe.

The film was released in November 2007 and was a major commercial success in Sri Lanka in that year, as well as receiving positive reviews. It is a remake of the 1999 Bollywood film Taal starring Aishwarya Rai, Anil Kapoor and Akshay Khanna.

== Plot ==
The film is about a Sinhalese man who falls in love with a Tamil woman.

Ranmalee(Pooja Umashankar, a girl from the country side meets a boy named Praveen (Roshan Ranawana), who is a son of a rich businessman from the capital whose family visited this village to find a site to build a new hotel. Praveen began to develop interest on Ranmalee since the interaction. Despite the growing interest between themselves, Praveen’s family are very reluctant with the affair due to the differences of wealth background, class and race.

== Cast ==
- Roshan Ranawana as Praveen
- Pooja Umashankar as Ranmalee / Maleesha
- Gayathri Dias as Praveen's sister
- Shiran Silva as Praveen's brother
- Nalin Pradeep Udawela as Sarath
- Sanath Gunathilake as Sapumal Senadheera
- Upeksha Swarnamali
- Umali Thilakarathne as Pabalu

== Production ==
The film was initially directed by Sumitra Peries. The music video for Piyabanna Asai was filmed in Kandy, Sri Lanka.

== Soundtrack ==
- "Pathu Pem Pathum (Walakul Wiyan Thanala)" - Performed by Bathiya Jayakody with Umaria Sinhawansa & Umara Sinhawansa
- "Samanal Hanguman Athare" - Performed by Uresha Ravihari
- "Pehasara Obe Adare" - Performed By Centigradz
- "Kasthuri Suwandaki" - Performed by Santhush Weeraman with Umara Sinhawansa & Ashanthi De Alwis
- "Hiru Meki Yai Neela Ahase" - Performed By Amila Perera
- "Pana Supem Sinawe/Vaarayo Vennilave" (remix) - Performed by Killer B and Yauwanan featuring Iraj

== Release ==
The film earned positive reviews and went on to become a major commercial success, further establishing Pooja Umashankar as a leading Sri Lankan actress.

== Accolades ==
Event	Category	Recipient	Ref.
32nd Sarasaviya Awards	Most Popular Film	Asai Man Piyabanna	
32nd Sarasaviya Awards	Best Female Vocalist	Uresha Ravihari	
32nd Sarasaviya Awards	Merit Award	Nalin Pradeep Udawela (Note: Also won for Tharaka Mal)	
