= Umaria Sinhawansa =

Sri Lankan singer (born 1991)

Umaria Sinhawansa උමාරියා සිංහවංශ
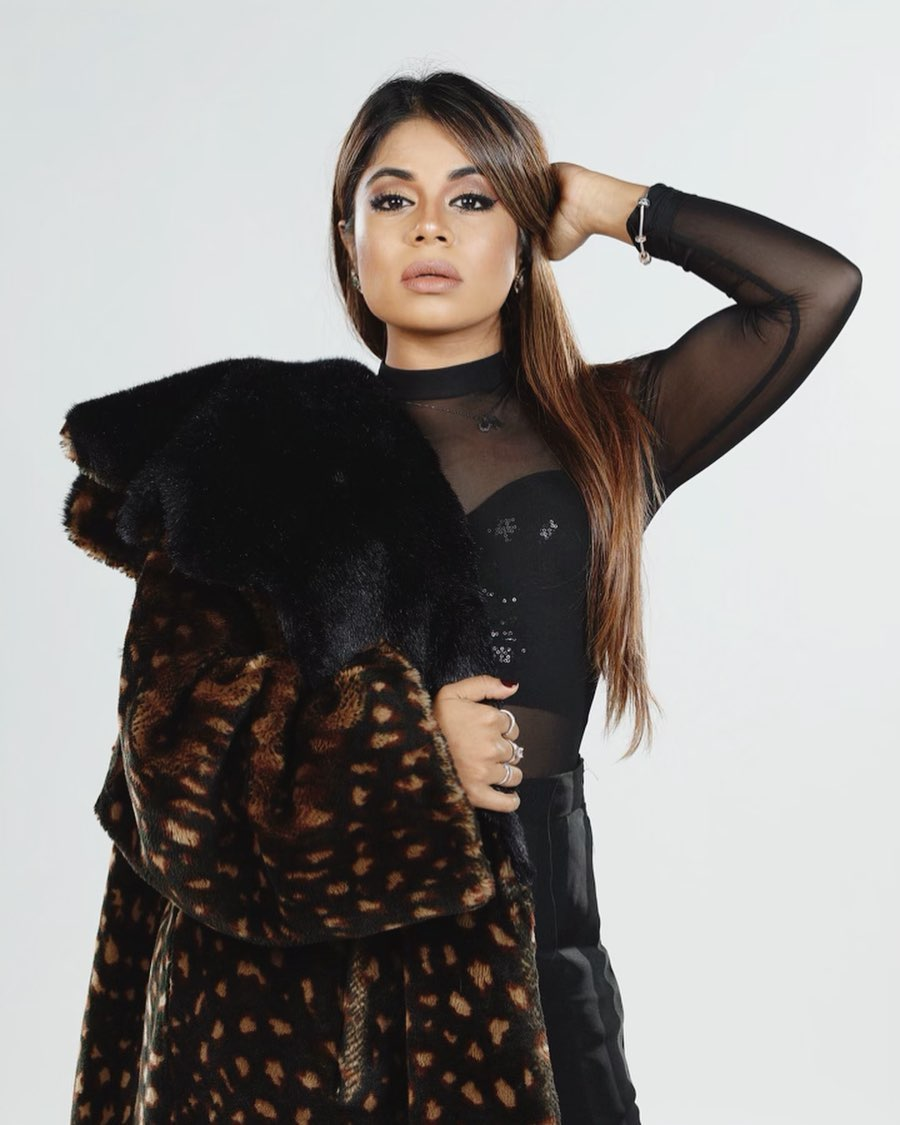
- Sinhawansa in 2021

Background information
- Born: Umaria Binti Aisyah Sinhawansa; 5 January 1991 (age 35); Colombo, Sri Lanka
- Genres: Pop; R&B; Jazz
- Occupations: musician; singer; performer; TV personality
- Instrument: Vocals
- Years active: 2005–present
- Labels: Nilwala; MEntertainment; wingmanindia; pettaheffect; exceedentertainment
- Award: Kala Kirti Abimani
- Education: BA in music
- Alma mater: Muslim Ladies' College, Colombo; Gateway International School, Colombo
- Relatives: Umara Sinhawansa (sister); Rukmani Devi (great aunt)

Umaria Binti Aisyah Sinhawansa (Sinhala: උමාරියා සිංහවංශ; born 5 January 1991), known professionally as Umaria, is a Sri Lankan pop, R&B, and jazz singer. She began performing publicly at age 11 with her sister in 2005. Her playback singing debut was featured in the 2007 movie Asai Man Piyabanna. She has participated in international music competitions, receiving silver awards at the Pan Asia International Music Competition and the Crimea Music Fest. Umaria also won the Sarasaviya Award for Best Female Playback Singer for her song Ahi Pillamak Athara from the film Vijayaba Kollaya in 2019 and the SLIM-Nielsen People's Award for Song of the Year for Manda Pama in 2021.

== Early life and education ==
Umaria Sinhawansa was born on 5 January 1991 in Colombo, Sri Lanka. Her parents, Tony Sinhawansa and Ayesha Sinhawansa, were both musicians. She studied at Muslim Ladies' College and Gateway International School in Colombo, Sri Lanka. She graduated with a bachelor's degree in music. She has two older brothers, Subandrio, who is also a musician, and Hartono, a music producer and entrepreneur. Umaria's grandmother, Rani Perera, was an actress in Sri Lankan cinema. She is also a granddaughter of the late songstress and actress Rukmani Devi.

== Career ==
At age 11, Umaria performed with her sister Umara for a public audience, marking the beginning of her professional music career. She performed a few songs with Sri Lankan music producer Sri Shyamalangan. She later joined with popular music duo Bathiya and Santhush (BnS) for a song of the Arabic genre called "Shaheena". After the song, she collaborated with BnS again for the Asai Man Piyabanna film playback "Pathu Pem Pathum". The song was a hit and became a turning point in her career.

In 2007, she became the youngest singer ever to be nominated for the Best Female Playback Singer at the Sarasaviya Awards. In 2009, she voiced the theme song for the television serial Gehenu Lamai. She also wrote "Gum Nade" for the movie Rosa Kele.

In 2010, aged 16, Umaria represented Sri Lanka in Pan Asia Music Festival, an international singing competition, which was held in Beijing, China. She later won first place from the semi-finals and the Silver medal from the whole competition. She was invited again to an international competition, this time in Turkey, where she was the only Asian contestant. In that competition, she won the bronze medal.

Later, she participated in the Crimea Music Fest with her sister. They both performed an original song titled "My Dreams", and covered the song "Halo" by Beyoncé. They won third place from that competition. After winning many international competitions, she returned to Sri Lanka, where she joined the Ashanthi School of Music conducted by Ashanthi De Alwis. During this period, she featured with Randhir Witana in the song Mal Madahasa.

In 2010, Sinhawansa performed on the International Indian Film Academy Awards (IIFA Awards) with BnS.

In 2013, she performed at the Commonwealth Heads of Government Meeting (CHOGM) opening ceremony. She recorded a duet with W. D. Amaradeva before his death.

In 2014, she featured with Dewasri de Silva for the song "Nidahase Inna", and took part in many BnS collaborations such as "Kavikariye", "Baila Gamuda Remix Karala", "Hinipeththata", and "Hitha Wawannema Na" .

In 2015, Umariya released her first original hit, Denuwan Piya, produced by BnS, which achieved commercial success. Meanwhile, she became a judge for the singing reality show, Sirasa Superstar. Then she joined the celebrity reality show "Hiru Mega Stars" for the team "Sooryans" along with Yureni Noshika, Himali Sayurangi, Asanka Perera, Pathum Rukshan, Piyumi Botheju and Akila Dhanuddara.

In 2017, she joined the reality program "Youth with Talent – Generation Next" as a guest judge.

In 2018, Umaria was complimented by Indian Prime Minister Narendra Modi for her performance of the song "Vaishnav Jana To," a musical tribute for Mahatma Gandhi's 150th birth anniversary.

In 2018 she released a single, Malak Nowe, and then featured with Ruwan Hettiarachchi for the song "Hiru Mal Kiniththak Dara". In the same year, she made playback singing for the film Bimba Devi alias Yashodhara. After that song, she became an A-Grade singer at Sri Lanka Broadcasting Corporation. She is the youngest artist to have achieved this feat. She later collaborated with BnS for the album Oba Nisa and toured for the Oba Nisa concert.

In 2019, she was a playback singer for the blockbuster Vijayaba Kollaya, directed by Sunil Ariyaratne. In the same year, she premiered her single, "Rangume" on 9 August. On 11 December 2019, she collaborated with BnS and Sanuka Wickramasinghe for the song Saragi Asille. During the pandemic, she performed the first Drive-In Concert in Sri Lanka.

On 3 July 2020, she released the solo "Manda Pama" which was recorded in France.

In November 2020, she joined the coaching panel of the reality show "The Voice Sri Lanka". Umaria is also known for her role as a coach on the televised singing competition The Voice Sri Lanka, where she was the winning coach of the season 2021. While working on "The Voice Sri Lanka" competition, she released the song "Rathu Eli". She also made cameo appearances in the films Dancing Stars and Spandana.

On 4 February 2021, she released the single "Yuda Gini Dumaraya" as a tribute to war heroes.

=== Television shows ===
Year	Title	Channel	Language	Role
2015–16	Sirasa Superstar (Season 7)	Sirasa TV	Sinhala	Judge – Herself
2020–21	The Voice Sri Lanka (Season 1)	Sirasa TV	Sinhala	Coach – Herself
2022–23	The Voice Sri Lanka (Season 2)	Sirasa TV	Sinhala	Coach – Herself

== Discography ==
=== Originals ===
Solo Tracks
No.	Title	Length
1.	""Denuwan Piya"" (Solo Track Version)	03.55
2.	""Kumuduniya"" (Solo Track Version)	04.00
3.	""Sandak Lesin Paya"" (Solo Track Version)	04:30
4.	""Araliya"" (Solo Track Version)	04.27
5.	""Malak Nowe"" (Solo Track Version)	03.37
6.	""Rangume"" (Solo Track Version)	03.37
7.	"Manda Pama" (Solo Track Version)	03.37
8.	"Ayachana" (Solo Track Version)	04.36
9.	""Yuda Gini Dumaraya"" (Solo Track Version)	03.58
10.	""Rathu Eli"" (Solo Track Version)	04.08
11.	""NAANE"" (Solo Track Version)	02.05

=== Popular Music Videos ===
Name	Video Director	Year
Manda Pama	Hasinth Pathirana	2020
Rangume	Chamil Pathirana	2019
Naane	Hasinth Pathirana	2022

=== Collaborations ===
Year	Song	Collaboration	Ref.
2009	Shaheena	Bathiya and Santhush	
2009	Ra Pura Payana Tharuka	Bathiya and Santhush	
2010	Baila Gamuda Remix Karala	Bathiya and Santhush	
2010	Wassanayata Atha Wanala	Umara Sinhawansa	
2010	Sithale Tharu Dilena Madiyame	Many artists	
2012	Kavikariye	Bathiya and Santhush	
2013	Mal Madahasa Pidena	Randhir Witana, Bathiya and Santhush	
2013	Meena Daasa Asha	Many artists	
2013	Sthuthi Sri Lanka	Many artists	
2014	Nidahase Inna	Devashrie de Silva	
2014	Sihine	Dushyanth Weeraman	
2014	Lassana Dasak	Bathiya and Santhush, Randhir Witana	
2015	Seethala Sulaga	Sunil Perera, Devashirie de Silva, Samitha Mudunkotuwa, Billy Fernando	
2015	Denimak Wage	Dewshan Perera	
2015	Hanthana Sihine	Pandith W. D. Amaradeva	
2015	Senehe Ammage	Shihan Mihiranga, Nirosha Virajini, Kasun Kalhara	
2018	Vaishnav Jana To	Bathiya and Santhush	
2018	Hiru Mal Kiniththak	Ruwan Hettiarachchi	
2019	Ma Obei Dan	Nalin Perera	
2019	Mathakai Eda	Billy Fernando	
2019	Saragi Asille	Bathiya and Santhush, Sanuka wickramasinghe	
2020	Nim Him Sewwa (cover song)	Bathiya and Santhush, Sashika Nisansala, Kasun Kalhara	
2021	Me Kirula	Amarasiri Peiris	
2021	T20 Cricket World Cup Song	various Artists	
2021	4 Nations International Tournament Theme Song	Sri Lanka Football ft. BNS, Randeer & Roy	
2021	Ekwa Jayagamu Lanka Premier League 2021 Official Theme Song	Bathiya and Santhush, Yohani, ADK, Sanka Dineth, Sajitha Anthony	

=== Playback singing ===
Year	Film	Songs	Ref.
2007	Asai Man Piyabanna	Pethu Pem Pethum	
2008	Rosa Kale	Gum Nade	
2008	Adaraye Namayen	Feel My love	
2009	Dancing Star	Sinaha Ko	
2015	Pravegaya	Sihilel Wu	
2015	Spandana	Man Vinda, Oya Muwe Hasaral	
2018	Sarungal	Thanivee	
2018	Bimba Devi alias Yashodhara	Thurul Karan	
2018	Ginnen Upan Seethala	Ane Ganadura	
2019	Vijayaba Kollaya	Ahi Pillamak Athara	

== Awards and nominations ==
Year	Work	Festival	Award	Result
2007	Pethu Pem Pethum	Sarasaviya Awards	Best Playback Singer	Nominated
2008	Gum Nade	Sarasaviya Awards	Best Playback Singer	Nominated
2010	International Music Competition	Asia Song Festival	Silver Award	Won
2010	cover song Listen by Beyonce	Asia Song Festival	Best Solo Performance	Won
2010	International Music Competition	Izmir Turkey	Bronze award at the original song contest	Won
2011	International Music Competition	Asian Youth Singing competition China	Silver Award	Won
2011	My Dreams- Original	Crimea Music Fest	Bronze Award	Won
2016	Lassana Dasak	Derana Music Video Awards	Best Music Video	Won
2016	Reality competition	Hiru Mega Stars	Champion Of The Competition	Won
2020	Contribution To The Country	Kala Keerthi Abhimani	Appreciative Award	Won
2020	contribution to the music	TV Derana Aya Pranama	Best Woman In Singing Category	Won
2021	Manda Pama	SLIM-Nielsen Peoples Awards	Song Of The Year	Won
2021	Contribution To The Country	Vanithabimani	Appreciative Award	Won
2023	Ane Ganadura	20th Presidential Awards	Best Playback Singer Woman Award 2019	Won
2024	Ahi Pillamak Athara	35th Sarasaviya Awards	Best Playback Singer Woman Award 2019	Won

== Milestones ==
- A grade award granted by Sri Lanka Broadcasting Corporation
- Youngest artist to be nominated for the Best Singer Award in 2007 and 2008 at the Sarasaviya Film Awards
- Performed on 2013 Commonwealth Heads of Government Meeting (CHOGM 2013) opening ceremony
- Performed on International Indian Film Academy Awards (IIFAA Awards) in 2010 with BnS
- Silver Award winner at the 11th Pan Asia Music Festival
- Bronze award at the original song contest in Izmir Turkey in 2010
- Solo performances in China 2010
- Silver medalist at the Asian Youth Singing competition, China in 2011
- Bronze award (with Umara) at Crimea Music Festival in 2011
- Song of the Year 2021 award at the SLIM-Nielsen Peoples Awards. (Song: Manda Pama)
- Honorary title ‘Kala Keethi Abhimani’ by the All Ceylon Cultural Environment Protection Organization.
- Nominated for the Most Popular Sri Lankan Woman 'Vanithabhimana 2020'.
- Won the Most Popular Sri Lankan Woman 'Vanithabhimana 2021'

== Other ventures ==
=== Philanthropy and activism ===
On May 14, 2020, Umaria was involved in a Sri Lankan Government effort to promote COVID-19 Prevention among people in Sri Lanka. She sang the song Itukama to educate the people about how COVID-19 prevention works in Sri Lanka. She also performed with BnS in many apartment complexes while following health safety measures in order to improve resident's emotional wellbeing during the lockdown with the help of Sri Lankan Government.

She has opened up a social media page called one promise to talk to people who are struggling with depression and other mental issues.

=== Brand ambassadorships and endorsements ===
2015, Umaria signed up for SLTMobitel and voiced many songs promoting the networking brand. In 2018, she signed up as brand ambassador for Signal toothpaste and she voiced their brand's theme song, Sina Bo Wewa. Meantime she was a brand ambassador of Sunlight (cleaning product) and she voiced the song Manu dam Viyamana with various artists.

In 2020, beauty brand British Cosmetics sponsored her song, Manda Pama. After the huge success of the song, on 21 November 2020, they announced Umaria as their new, main brand ambassador. She endorses the product Discover the Power of Gold - Prevense Advanced Gold Therapy and many of British Cosmetics' products. Afterwards she was named as a brand ambassador for the food and drink brand, Nestlé Sri Lanka's Nestamolt campaign. The company released an advertisement showcasing a campaign between the company and Umaria with some of the proceeds going to "organizations that seek to improve people's health as well as mental and emotional well-being. Dialog Axiata signed Umaria as their brand ambassador for their Dialog Fun Blaster campaign and they collaborated with her song Manda Pama. On Mar 12, 2021, the phone brand Oppo announced Umaria as their brand ambassador; she is currently endorsing the OPPO F19 Pro.
