= Kanchana (name) =

Kanchana or Kanjana is an Indic-language-based name, often used as a feminine given name. People with the name include:

- Kanchana (actress), stage name of Vasundhara Devi, Indian actress born 1939
- Kanchana Gunawardene, Sri Lankan cricketer
- Kanchana Kamalanathan, Indian politician
- Kanchana Kanchanasut, Thai computer scientist
- Kanjana Kuthaisong, Thai volleyball player
- Kanchana Mendis, Sri Lankan actress
- Kanchana Moitra, Bengali film actress
- Kanchana Silpa-archa, Thai politician
- Kanjana Sungngoen, Thai footballer
- Kanchana Wijesekera, Sri Lankan politician
- Ama Kanchana, Sri Lankan cricketer
- Dilshan Kanchana, Sri Lankan cricketer
- Janaka Kanchana, Sri Lankan Guinness world record holder

== See also ==
- Kanchana
