= Nader Guirat =

Tunisian musical artist

Nader Guirat نادر قيراط
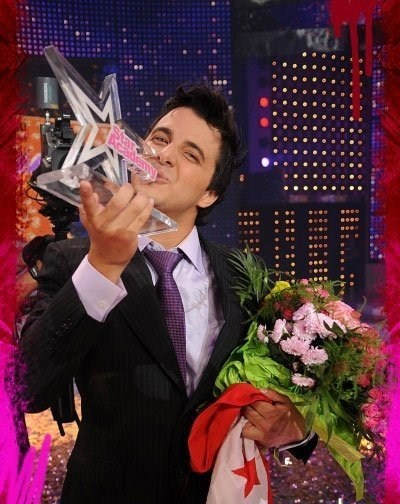
- Nader Guirat winner of Star Academy 5 carrying the Tunisian flag and the trophy on stage at the show's finale on May 23, 2008

Background information
- Born: May 16, 1986 (age 39); Sousse, Tunisia
- Origin: Tunisia
- Genres: Pop, pop rock, alternative
- Occupations: Singer-songwriter, musician
- Instruments: Vocals, guitar, classical guitar
- Years active: 2008–present
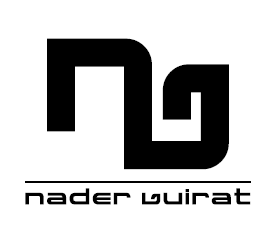
- Website: naderguirat.com Nader Guirat's Logo

Nader Guirat (/ˈɡiːrɑːt/; Arabic: نادر قيراط; pronounced [ˈnɛːder ɡiːrˤɑːtˤ]; born May 16, 1986) is a Tunisian pop rock singer-songwriter and musician who won the title of Star Academy Arab World on the 5th season of the reality talent show. His performances were noted for their inclusion of a repertoire of songs interpreting varied genres of Pop, Rock, House, and acoustic in Arabic, English, French, Spanish, and Italian. He sang Tina Arena, Chris De Burgh, Alessandro Safina, Cheb Khaled, Akram Sedkaoui, Amel Bent, Nadia, Yves Larock, Karl Wolf, Massari and Hot Banditoz.

== Early life ==
Nader Guirat was born on May 16, 1986, in the coastal city of Sousse, in Tunisia, to Nejib Guirat, a business man and Raoudha Boukthir. The eldest child of the couple, his younger siblings are sister Nahed and brother Zied.

Guirat first public performance was at the age of five in nursery school, where he performed songs of late veteran Egyptian singer Abdul Halim Hafiz. In an interview with a local Tunisian magazine Le Temps, Nader describes when he first defied himself to become a singer, while watching TV with his father he spurted out that "One Day You Will See Me Out There"

Guirat realized that acoustic and pop rock genres were more of his style when he learnt guitar at 14. Though his attention was still split between music and sports, trying his hand at martial arts, soccer and tennis, he formed his first band, 'Hypnos' at age 15 and recorded his first demo, singing lead and produced his first album with the band with songs in English and French.

== Music career ==
=== Star Academy (2008) ===
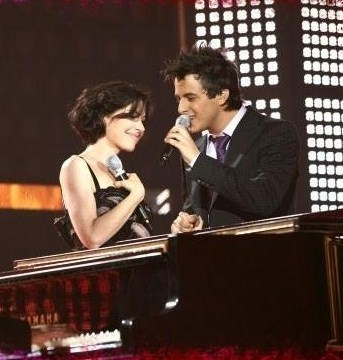
Nader performing on stage with Tina Arena in Lebanon on the show – Star Academy 2008

In 2008 Guirat auditioned for the 5th season of the show Star Academy which is the Arab World's version of the French show with its namesake Star Academy (France) based in Lebanon. Along with Guirat there were 19 other participants at the competition representing different countries from the Middle East and North Africa. After 4 months Guirat reached the show's grand finale with two others. Guirat won that seasons' title with the highest percentage of votes from global viewers. Back home Guirat was welcomed on arrival at Tunis-Carthage Airport by the former Tunisian Minister of Culture. The show launched Guirat's music career.

=== "L'Ange Perdu" (2009) ===
In 2009 Guirat released his début single 'L’Ange Perdu' (The Lost Angel), a reprise of an Arabic score by singer/composer Marwan Khoury, performed in French. The lyrics which he co-penned with fellow countryman Ayman Jouadi echo a story from Guirat's childhood. He financed the project and collaborated with music arranger Michel Fadel and 'The National Symphony Orchestra of Ukraine', where the song video was shot. "L’Ange Perdu" received best song of the year award from Tunisian radio station Jawhara FM

=== Crimea Music Fest (September 2011) ===
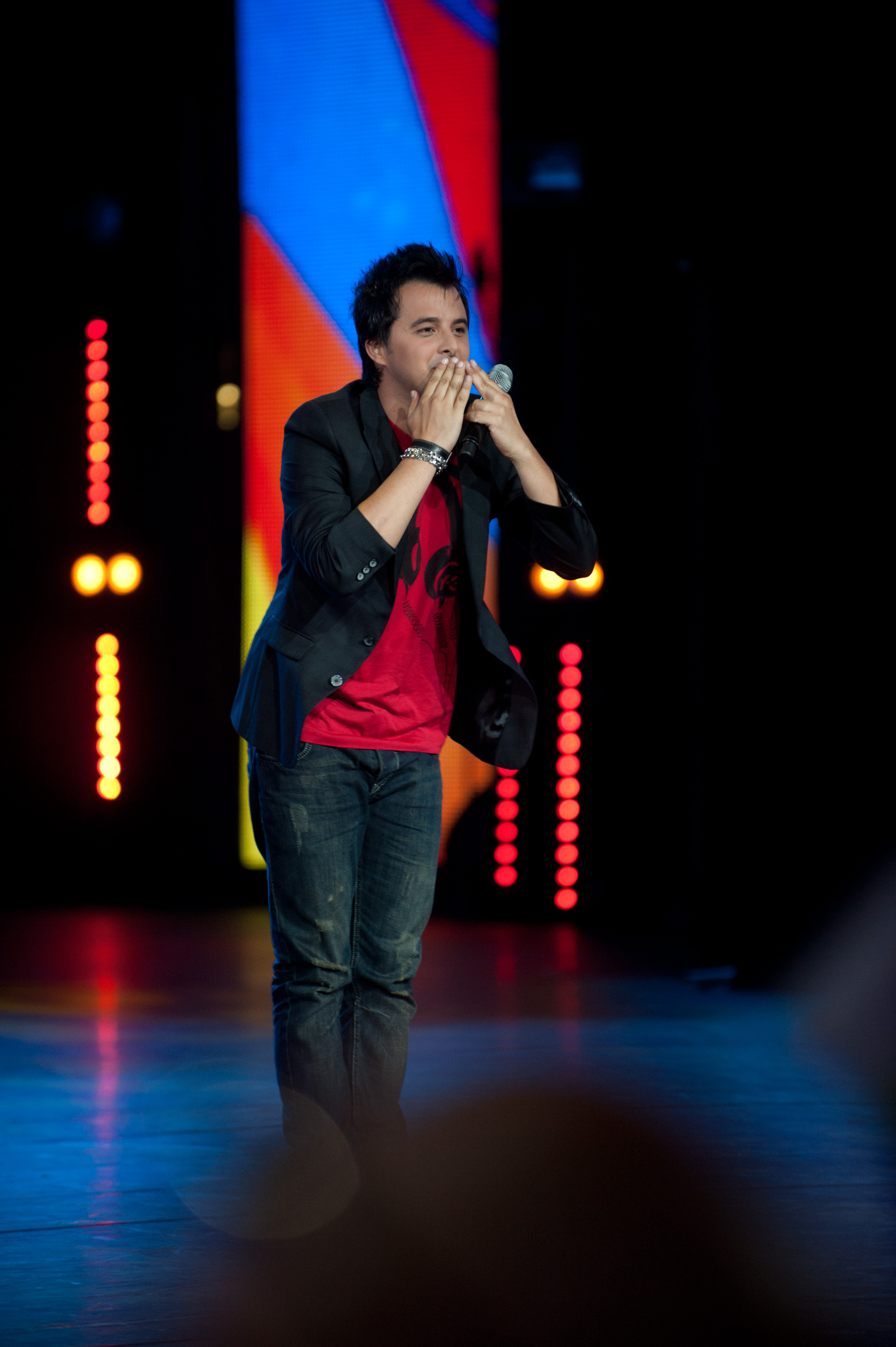
Nader performing at the Crimea Music Fest in Ukraine, 2011

In 2011 organisers of the first international music festival in Ukraine, Crimea Music Fest, invited Guirat to participate at the festival as a performer and contestant representing his country Tunisia. Thus, becoming the only participant from the Arab World to partake in the international festival.

Contestants on the show were required to present two performances, an International hit song and a traditional song of cultural significance representing each contestant's country. Guirat performed the hit song 'Aicha' by Algerian singer Cheb Khaled for the international hit category and performed the Tunisian folk song 'Sidi Mansour' for the second category.

=== "Helma-Rêve" (October 2011) ===
"Reve - Helma"
Nader's French-Arabic duet with Mohamed Dahleb.

Two years following the release of his first single, Guirat released a Franco-Arab duet entitled 'Helma-Rêve' (Dream), a joint collaboration with Tunisian singer Mohammed Dahleb. The two young artists recorded the single written by fellow Tunisian musician Zaher Zorgati with arrangement and realisation by Kais Melliti.

=== Nehebak Ya Chaab (November 2011) ===
Following the breakout of the Tunisian revolution an array of veteran and young Tunisian artists and celebrities celebrated its first anniversary with the production of “Nhebak Ya Chaab” (A song for the people). Guirat was amongst the all-star cast of performers including veteran singer Lotfi Bouchnak. For the shooting of the music video, Arab and Tunisian media, including Radio Sfax with their star host Karim Qutatah, were present to cover the production commemorating the revolution. Music was by Nomene Chaari and directed by Mehdi Ben Omar.

=== OxyMore ===
Oxymore Band members

Current members

- Nader Guirat – lead vocals, Guitar
- Mohammed Al-Okbi – bass
- Karim Gharbi – guitar, back-up vocals
- Hichem Mazgou – percussion, vocals

Former band members

- Rafik Gharbi – keyboard, back-up vocals

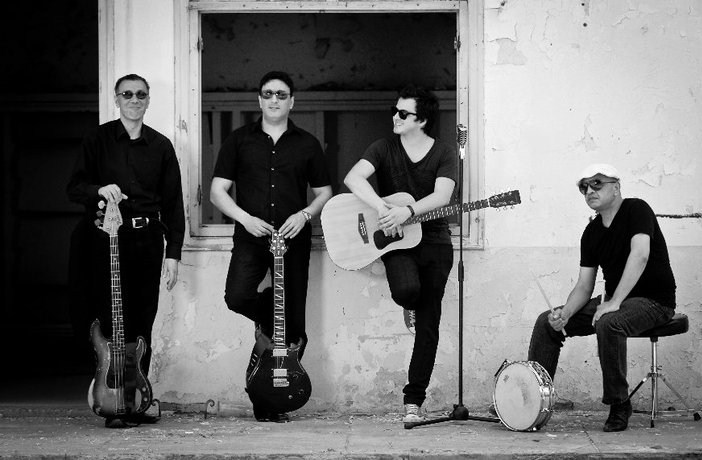
Nader Guirat with his Oxymore Band members

Late 2011 Guirat formed his new band 'OxyMore'. A 4-member group consisting of 3 guitarists including Guirat and a percussionist. Guirat devised the name of the group which reflects on the members' age gap and varied musical styles.

=== "I'm Waiting" (February 2012) ===
In 2012, Guirat released a new record featuring American singer, Dylan Lloyd, a fellow contestant he had met at Crimea Music Fest. The Crimea Music Festival organisers released a write-up on their website on the collaboration of both artists Nader and Dylan marking the record's release. The single “I’m Waiting” was released in February of the same year. A music video of the song was released in July 2012.

=== "The Jasmine's Calling" (September 2012) ===
On September 7 Guirat announced on Facebook the release of his latest single 'The Jasmine's Calling', the song was uploaded on his fanpage with the post heading "Pour une Tunisie Libre et Moderne" (for a free and modern Tunisia). The song, composed by Guirat, follows the recent turmoil in Tunisia in the aftermath of the January 2011 Tunisian revolution dubbed by the international media 'The Jasmine Revolution'. The outcome of which has become increasingly frustrating for the Tunisians as development is slow-paced and political parties stand at a face-off for power. The song sends a message to all Tunisian people to unite as 'one' for the future of their country and to set aside their political and religious differences, explains Guirat in an interview with Tunisian 'Al-Chourouk' newspaper. The song is a music compilation of rock with an added oriental flare showcased in the use of instruments such as the Middle Eastern flute, Ney and Oriental drum, Darabuka.

Nader Guirat's "The Jasmine's Calling"
Guirat's latest single.

'The Jasmine's Calling' is composed by Guirat, lyrics by Canadian lyricist Ramona, arrangement by fellow Tunisian Elyes Bouchoucha, orchestration and mix at Studio Event, Tunisia and music mastering at Color Sound Studio, Paris, France.

Promoting 'The Jasmine's Calling' on Tunisian Radio station, Jawhara FM Guirat talked about his future plans of moving to Paris, France which is to be his new permanent residence. Guirat explains that he has found the music scene there more inviting to his ambitions and the music style/genre he is adopting. He added that in France his plans include working on more songs he has in store for his début album.

== Awards ==
Nader received a joint award from the Tunisian radio station Jawhara FM for best song of the year for 'L'Ange Perdu' as a result of an online nationwide survey. The award was presented to him in a live broadcast.

== Personal life ==
Nader is married and he has a daughter named Tamara.

== Discography ==
- "L'Ange Perdu" (2009)
- "Reve-Helma" (2011)
- "I’m Waiting" (2012)
- "The Jasmine's Calling" (September 2012)

== Filmography ==
- 2015 : The Doubt's Night by Majdi Smiri as Slim
- 2016 :
  - Bolice (Police) 2.0 by Majdi Smiri
  - Warda w Kteb (A Rose and a Book) by Ahmed Rjeb as Haythem

Awards and achievements
Preceded by (Iraq) Shaza hassoun	Star Academy Arab World Winner; Season 5 2008 (Tunisia) Nader Guirat	Succeeded by (Saudi Arabia) Abdulaziz Abdulrahman
