= Kanchanaburi (disambiguation) =

Kanchanaburi may refer to

- Kanchanaburi War Cemetery
- Kanchanaburi, town in Thailand
  - Kanchanaburi Province
  - Mueang Kanchanaburi district

== See also ==
- Kanchanpur (disambiguation)
- Kanchana (disambiguation)
- Buri (disambiguation)
