= Umara Sinhawansa =

Sri Lankan singer and musician (born 1987)

Umara Sinhawansa උමාරා සිංහවංශ
- Born: 14 March 1987 (age 39); Colombo, Sri Lanka
- Genres: Pop; R&B; jazz
- Occupations: Singer; songwriter; producer; audio engineer
- Instrument: Vocals
- Years active: 1999–present
- Website: umaramusicacademy.com

Umara Sinhawansa born 14 March 1987, is a Sri Lankan singer,Musician music producer, and audio engineer. She gained prominence as a frequent collaborator with the musical duo Bathiya and Santhush before establishing a career as a solo artist. In 2017, she founded the music academy Umara Music Studio (UMS).

== Early life ==
Sinhawansa was born to Tony and Ayesha Sinhawansa in 1987 a family of professional musician. She has one sister, Umaria, who is also a singer, along with two brothers. Her great aunt is Rukmani Devi.

She was educated at the Muslim Ladies' College in Colombo, Sri Lanka, and went on to represent the country in three international singing competitions. She won third place at the 2011 Crimea Music Fest and first place at Sri Lanka's All-Island Singing Competition, alongside her sister.

== Career ==
At the age of ten, she made her first professional recording with her sister Umaria, and gave her first public performance at the age of 13. She later collaborated with the singing duo Bathiya and Santhush. Her singles include "Wassanayata", "Shaheena", "Sihina Ko", and "Malak Thibuna", a duet with Chithral Somapla.

After returning to Sri Lanka in 2017, Sinhawansa launched her academy, Umara Music Studio (UMS), which provides music and vocal training to students of all ages.

== National anthem controversy ==
On 30 July 2023, she faced backlash for her performance of the Sri Lankan national anthem, "Sri Lanka Matha", at the opening ceremony of the Lanka Premier League cricket tournament held at R. Premadasa Stadium.

Public opinion was divided. Critics accused her of distorting the lyrics by changing the word "matha" ('mother') to "mahatha" ('mister'). Others criticized her operatic and westernized singing style, arguing it deviated from traditional performances of the anthem. Public figures, such as fellow singer Ashanthi De Alwis and MP Chamathka Ratnayake of Samagi Jana Balawegaya defended her.

Politicians from the Sri Lankan Buddha Sasana political party and the Ministry of Public Administration, Home Affairs, Provincial Councils and Local Government condemned the event as unconstitutional, citing protections of the national anthem included in the 1978 Constitution of Sri Lanka.

On 31 July 2023, Public Administration Ministry Secretary Ranjith Asoka issued a gazette announcing a probe to investigate the alleged distortion of the national anthem.

On 2 August 2023, Sinhawansa apologized on social media regarding the controversy.

== Awards and accomplishments ==
- She represented Sri Lanka at two international singing competitions held in Kazakhstan and China.
- Won the Gold Award at the 2011 Crimea Music Fest, held in Ukraine, performing with her sister Umaria
- She was the youngest female musician in Sri Lanka to collaborate with Shankar Mahadevan (of Shankar–Ehsaan–Loy).

== Filmography ==
Television

Year	Title	Channel	Language	Role
2017	Youth with Talent – Generation Next	ITN	Sinhala	Judge
2021	Derana Dream Star (season 10)	TV Derana	Sinhala	Judge

Film soundtrack

Year	Title	Role	Language	Country
2019	U Turn	Playback singer	Sinhala	Sri Lanka
