= Youth with Talent – Generation Next =

- Hosted by: Dilshan Pathirathna
- Judges: Rookantha Gunathilake; Nadeesha Hemamali; Umara Sinhawansa; Kishu Gomes; Chitral Somapala
- Winner: Janaka Kanchana

Release
- Original network: ITN
- Original release: October 2017 – January 2018

Youth with Talent - Generation Next is a Sri Lankan reality talent contest that aired on ITN (Independent Television Network) in 2017.

== Format ==
The competition featured contestants aged 15 to 35. It was hosted by Dilshan Pathirathna and directed by music and television drama director Sandaruwan Jayawickrama. Key production contributors included Saman Athaudahetti, Chairman of ITN, and Eranda Weliange, Chairman of the National Youth Services Council (NYSC).

== Auditions ==
Auditions were conducted across Sri Lanka to identify the most outstanding performers for national television broadcast. Each audition round featured 20 participants. Judges selected 10 candidates to advance to the next stage, and the numbers gradually decreased through successive elimination rounds. Exceptional acts that received the coveted Golden Buzzer were granted direct entry into the grand finale.

== Round 1 ==
Round 1 of the competition took place over a three-month period, commencing on 9 September 2017 and concluding on 16 December 2017. During this initial stage, contestants from across the country competed in front of a panel of judges, aiming to secure their place in the next phase of the show.

== Round 2 ==
Round 2 of the competition was conducted from 23 December 2017 to 27 January 2018. The performances were more challenging and the stakes were higher, as only the most exceptional acts would move forward to the next stage of the competition.

=== Round 2 Summary ===
Legend:

- Buzzed out/Lost Vote
- Voted to next round
- Talent of the day
- Advanced

==== Round 2-1 Episode 16 (23 December 2017) ====
Guest Judge: Chandani Seneviratne

Contestant	Age	Hometown	Order	Act Type	Buzzes				Result
Contestant	Age	Hometown	Order	Act Type	Kishu	Umara	Chithraal	Nadeesha	Result
Umesha Alahakon	23	Anuradhapura	1	Solo dancer					Eliminated
Emil Tharanga	29	Colombo	2	Close up/stage magician					Advanced
Praveen Melroy	19	Matara	3	Bike stunt performer					Advanced
Janith Dimuthu	23	Rajanganaya	4	Extreme danger act					Advanced
Dilip			5	Artist					Advanced
Chameera			6	Danger act					Advanced
Name not announced			7	Dance group					Advanced
Wasanthi			8	Contortionist and danger act					Advanced

==== Round 2-2 Episode 17 (30 December 2017) ====
Guest Judge: Rukshi Gamage

Contestant	Age	Hometown	Order	Act Type	Buzzes				Result
Contestant	Age	Hometown	Order	Act Type	Kishu	Umara	Chithraal	Nadeesha	Result
Vindya De Alwis	22	Colombo	1	Close up and stage magician					Advanced
Vihan Aponso	19	Ratmalana	2	Beat boxer					Advanced
Three sisters	16/11/8	Mullaitivu	3	Gymnastics					Advanced *
Issai Archanai	14/17	Colombo	4	Instrumentalists					Advanced
Rajitha Lakshitha	20	Homagama	5	Hip-hop dancer					Advanced
Ranatunga		Panduwasnuwara	6	Karate act					Eliminated
Farshan			7	Stunt					Eliminated
Rasith			8	Bike stunt					Eliminated
Sentry			9	Traditional and western dance group					Advanced

==== Round 2-3 Episode 18 (6 January 2018) ====
Guest Judge: Indika Upamali

Contestant	Age	Hometown	Order	Act Type	Buzzes				Result
Contestant	Age	Hometown	Order	Act Type	Kishu	Umara	Chithraal	Nadeesha	Result
Ruwan Chamara	26	Elpitiya	1	Bike stunt					Advanced
Geeth Prasanna	32	Kandy	2	Singer					Advanced
Z & R	22-26	Mawanella / Gampola	3	Artists					Advanced *
Nishfahan			4	Mathematician					Advanced
Sujeetharan			5	Dance group					Advanced
Dinesh			6	Gymnastics					Advanced *
Name not announced			7	Magician					Advanced *
Nadeesha			8	Solo dancer					Advanced
K. Samarakoon	29	Polonnaruwa	9	Danger act					

==== Round 2-4 Episode 19 (13 January 2018) ====
Guest Judge: Dannielle Kerkoven

Contestant	Age	Hometown	Order	Act Type	Buzzes				Result
Contestant	Age	Hometown	Order	Act Type	Kishu	Umara	Chithraal	Nadeesha	Result
Wheel Fighters	16/25	Panadura	1	Bike stunt					Advanced
Janaka			2	Danger act					Advanced
Dhammika Susantha Kumara	27	Medawachchiya	3	Highest kick					Advanced
Name not announced (a Kid)			4	Solo traditional dance					Eliminated
Name not announced			5	Magician					Advanced
Dimuthu			6	Act with fire "Gini Sisila"					Advanced
Heshan Tharanga			7	Singer					Advanced
Oshantha			8	Magician					Advanced
Saumya			9	Instrumentalist and singer					Advanced
Hansaka Shehan	14	Nuwara Eliya	10	Unicycle circus					Advanced *

==== Round 2-5 Episode 20 (20 January 2018) ====
Guest Judge: Sangeetha Weeraratne

Contestant	Age	Hometown	Order	Act Type	Buzzes				Result
Contestant	Age	Hometown	Order	Act Type	Kishu	Umara	Chithraal	Nadeesha	Result
Tharindu Rumayantha	24	Avissawella	1	Balancing Act					Advanced
Tharumaraja Thuwaragan	22	Jaffna	2	Musical Instrument					Advanced
Kawindya Jayasinghe	14	Kandy	3	Solo Traditional Dance					Advanced
Nimesh Madhuwantha	17	Ratmalana	4	Dance Act					Advanced
Chamara Madhushanka Dissanayake	26	Horowpathana	5	Danger Act					Advanced
Subha			6	Act with Fire "Gini Sisila"					Advanced

==== Challenge Round Episode 21 (27 January 2018) ====
Guest Judge: Srimali Fonseka

Contestant	Age	Hometown	Order	Act Type	Buzzes				Result
Contestant	Age	Hometown	Order	Act Type	Kishu	Umara	Chithraal	Nadeesha	Result
Beat Bullets	17-25	Maharagama	1	Dance Act					Eliminated *
Udaya Madhusanka	25	Bandarawela	2	Magician					Selected to the pool and later Eliminated
Chamara Thusitha Bandara	30	Kurunegala	3	Stunt					Selected to the pool and later Advanced
Sujeewa Lakmal	31	Matara	4	Stunt					Eliminated
Thilindika Kumari			5	Dance Act					Selected to the pool and later Eliminated
Name not announced (4 children)			6	Dance Act					

== Semi-finals ==
Semifinals started on February 10, 2018. There were 38 contestants, and only 6 were selected by the judge panel. Each semi-final consisted of 19 contestants.

- Buzzed out/Lost Vote
- Voted to the pool
- Talent of the day
- Selected to pool

=== Semi Finals 1 Episode 23 (10 February 2018) ===
Guest Judge : TBA

Contestant	Age	Hometown	Order	Buzzes				Result
Contestant	Age	Hometown	Order	Kishu	Umara	Chithraal	Nadeesha	Result
Ruwan Chamara	26	Elpitiya	1					Advanced
Wheel fighters	16 & 25	Panadura	2					Advanced
Emil Eranga	29	Colombo	3					Advanced
Sentry	13-22	Kolannawa	4					Advanced
Nimesh Maduwantha		Ratmalana	5					Advanced*
Praveen Melroy	19	Matara	6					Advanced
Nishfahan			7					Advanced
Janith Dimuthu	23	Rajanganaya	8					Advanced
Three sisters	8, 11 & 16	Mullaitivu	9					Advanced

=== Semi Finals 3 Episode 24 (18 February 2018) ===
Guest Judge: TBA

Contestant	Age	Hometown	Order	Buzzes				Result
Contestant	Age	Hometown	Order	Kishu	Umara	Chithraal	Nadeesha	Result
Tharindu Rumayantha	24	Avissawella	1					Advanced
Ushantha Madhuwantha	19	Badulla	2					Advanced
Hansaka Shehan	14	Nuwara Eliya	3					Advanced
Subha Hansani	19	Kandy	4					Advanced
Nimesh Maduwantha		Ratmalana	5					Advanced*
Praveen Melroy	19	Matara	6					Advanced
Nishfahan			7					Advanced
Janith Dimuthu	23	Rajanganaya	8					Advanced
Three sisters	8, 11 & 16	Mullaitivu	9					Advanced

== Finals ==
- Held on 3 March 2018
- Guest Judge: Hemal Ranasinghe
- The top 10 contestants participated in the competition including the golden buzzer acts.

Key	Top 3	Top 10

Contestant	Age	Hometown	Order	Buzzes				Result
Contestant	Age	Hometown	Order	Kishu	Umara	Chithraal	Nadeesha	Result
Emil Eranga	29	Colombo	1					Top 10
Janaka Kanchana Mudunnayake	32	Haghuranketha	2					Top 3
Upul Ranjith	26	Medawachchiya	3					Top 10
Janaka		TBA	4					Top 10
Nimesh Maduwantha	17	Ratmalana	5					Top 3
Janith Dimuthu	23	Rajanganaya	6					Top 10
Nishfahan			7					Top 3
Janaka Jeewa	23	TBA	8					Top 10
Dhilanga and Chamodh	15 & 13	Anuradhapura	9					Top 10
Subha Hansani	19	Kandy	10					Top 10

== Top three (3) ==
Key	Winner	Runner-up	2nd Runner-up

Contestant	Age	Hometown	Act	Percentage Votes	Result						
Contestant	Age	Hometown	Act	Percentage Votes	Result	Nimesh Maduwantha	17	Ratmalana	Contortionist, bone breaker and dancer	7.4%	2nd Runner-up
Nishfahan		Nawalapitiya	Mathematician	39.7%	Runner-up						
Janaka Kanchana Mudunnayake		Hanguranketha	Strong man	52.9%	Winner						

== Top 42 Acts ==
Key	Winner	Runner-up	Third Place	Top 10	Eliminated at pool (semifinals)	Eliminated at pool (quarterfinals)	Golden buzzer	Talent of the day	Judges' wild card (semifinals)

Name of Contestant(s)	Age(s)	Genre	Act	Hometown	Round 2	Semifinal	Result
Dhilanga and Chamodh	15 & 13	Danger	Circus	Anuradhapura	—N/a	—N/a	Finalist
Janaka Kanchana Mudannayake	32	Variety	Strong man	Haghuranketha	—N/a	—N/a	Finalist
Janaka Jeewa		Danger	Danger varieties		04	02	Finalist
D. L. E. Upul Ranjith	26	Dance	Solo dancer	Medawachchiya	—N/a	—N/a	Finalist
Janaka		Danger	Balance act		—N/a	—N/a	Finalist
Emil Eranga	29	Magic	Closeup/stage magician	Colombo	01	01	Finalist
Nimesh Madhuwantha	17	Dance	Solo dancer & Contortionist	Ratmalana	05	01	Finalist
Subha		Dance	Fire dancer		05	02	Finalist
Nishfahan		Variety	Mathematician		03	01	TBA
Janith Dimuthu	23	Danger	Extreme danger act	Rajanganaya	01	01	Finalist
Hansaka Shehan	14	Danger	Unicycle	Nuwara Eliya	04	01	Eliminated
Tharindu Rumayantha	24	Danger	Balancing	Avissawella	05	02	Eliminated
Sentry		Dance	Traditional Dance group		02	01	Eliminated
K. Samarakoon	21	Danger	Circus	Polonnaruwa	03	02	Eliminated
Wheel Fighters	16/25	Danger	Stunt	Panadura	04	01	Eliminated
Chamara Thusitha Bandara	25	Danger	Stunt	Bandarawela	Challenge	02	Eliminated
Praveen Melroy	19	Danger	Stunt	Matara	01	01	Eliminated
Three sisters	8,11 & 16	Danger	Gymnastics	Mullaitivu	02	01	Eliminated
Vindya De Alwis	22	Magic	Closeup/stage magician	Colombo	02	02	Eliminated
Ruwan Chamara	26	Danger	Stunt	Elpitiya	03	01	Eliminated
Tharumaraja Thuwargan	22	Music	Instrumentalist	Jaffna	05	02	Eliminated
Name not announced		Variety	Artist		01	02	Eliminated
Chameera		Danger	Danger circus		01	—N/a	Eliminated
Name not announced		Dance	Dance group		01	—N/a	Eliminated
Wasanthi		Danger	Contortionist/balance		01	—N/a	Eliminated
Vihan Aponso	19	Singing	Beat-boxer	Ratmalana	02	—N/a	Eliminated
Issai Archanai	14 & 17	Music	Instrumentalists	Colombo	02	—N/a	Eliminated
Geeth Prasanna	32	Singing	Singer	Kandy	03	—N/a	Eliminated
Z & R	22-26	Variety	Artists	Manawella / Gampola	03	—N/a	Eliminated
Sujeethran		Dance	Dance group		03	—N/a	Eliminated
Dinesh		Danger	Gymnastics		03	—N/a	Eliminated
Name not announced		Magic	Magician		03	—N/a	Eliminated
Nadeesha		Dance	Solo dancer		03	—N/a	Eliminated
Dhammika Susantha Kumara	27	Danger/Guinness	Highest kick	medawachchiya	04	—N/a	Eliminated
Name not announced		Magic	Magician		04	—N/a	Eliminated
Dimuthu		Dance	Fire dancer		04	—N/a	Eliminated
Heshan Tharanga		Singing	Singer		04	—N/a	Eliminated
Oshantha		Magic	Closeup magician		04	—N/a	Eliminated
Saumya		Music/Singing	Instrumentalist and singer		04	—N/a	Eliminated
Chamara Madhushanka Dissanayake	26	Danger	Extreme danger	Horowpathana	05	—N/a	Eliminated
Rajitha Lakshitha	20	Dance	Hip hop	Homagama	02	—N/a	Eliminated
Kawindya Jayasinghe	14	Dance	Traditional dancer	Kandy	05	—N/a	Eliminated
