= Spandana (2015 film) =

Spandana ස්පන්දන
- official poster
- Directed by: Suneth Malinga Lokuhewa
- Written by: Suneth Malinga Lokuhewa
- Produced by: Jagath M. Yapa
- Starring: Shalani Tharaka; Dilhani Ekanayake; Roshan Ranawana
- Cinematography: Prabath
- Edited by: Shan Alwis
- Music by: Udaya Sri Wickramasinghe; Umaria Sinhawansa
- Release date: 18 March 2015
- Running time: 131 minutes
- Country: Sri Lanka
- Language: Sinhala
- Budget: 9 Million LKR
- Box office: 4 Million LKR

Spandana (Sinhala: ස්පන්දන) is a 2015 Sri Lankan romantic horror film directed by Suneth Malinga Lokuhewa and produced by Jagath M. Yapa. The cast includes Shalani Tharaka and Dilhani Ekanayake in lead roles, as well as Roshan Ranawana and Mahendra Perera. The soundtrack music for the film was composed by Udaya Sri Wickramasinghe. It is the 1,223rd Sri Lankan film to be released in the Sinhala cinema.

== Plot ==
Piumi Irugalbandara is the sister of Saliya Irugalbandara. Piumi lived alone and died unexpectedly after a phone conversation with Saliya's wife. Mayumi Irugalbandara is Saliya's daughter. She falls ill due to a heart condition. After her recovery, Mayumi reveals that she is living with her aunt Piumi's transplanted heart.

Following these events, many incidents occur around Mayumi. She decides to go to Piumi's bungalow with her friends for the final prayers for her deceased aunt. Her boyfriend, Sithum and other friends Achini, Shakya, Vihanga and Kelum, also visit the bungalow. The bungalow keeper, Darshan, requests to go home for several days. Kelum, who is a bit of a prankster, tricks Achini and Shakya by pretending to be a ghost. On discovering the prank, Achini slaps Kelum and leaves the bungalow disappointed.

In the following sequence, Kelum dies by drowning. Mayumi sees visions of her aunt and reveals to others that her aunt's spirit seeks revenge and asks Mayumi to carry it out. However, Mayumi becomes emotional and afraid from this revelation and Aunt Piumi begins to hunt down her assailants. Vihanga searches for Kelum and is attacked by Piumi's ghost. He is subsequently killed in a car accident.

Achene and Shakya begin to suspect something is wrong in the house and consider leaving. Meanwhile, Sithum is injured and unable to walk. As a result, the three girls decide to leave him in the house alone and decide to go to a house close by to ask for help. At that moment, they see a kovil and meet Mahendra Sami.

Sami tells them that the spirit of Aunt Piumi is seeking revenge for her death and will attack any man. The girls asked for a solution and Sami advises them to wait for the next day, which will be the day of a Full Moon. Sami also asks them to protect Sithum from the spirit until the Yaga. The girls come to the bungalow to protect Sithum from the spirit, but by the morning Sithum is found in the courtyard in an injured state. This contradicts the prediction made by Sami, who indicated that the keeper, Darshan, would be the next man to meet his fate at the hands of the ghost.

The next day, Sami, with his wife discovers that the ghost of Aunt Piumi lives within Mayumi and her heart. The spirit is summoned and begins to tell the story that she had a secret relationship with the bungalow keeper, Darshan, and another man. Darshan discovered the other relationship and became jealous. The two argued so much that Darshan killed Piumi by suffocation in an uncontrollable act of rage and jealousy. Mayumi is protected from the spirit and the group heal the torment of Aunt Piumi's ghost through chanting.

During the film's final scenes, the grave of Aunt Piumi is beside the grave of Mayumi. The conclusion of the film reveals that it was the spirit of Aunt Piumi who possessed Mayumi and by releasing Piumi's turmoil, left Mayumi's body without a soul. It is also revealed that Piumi had a crush on Sithum and that the ghost has now taken control of him. With the secret that Mayumi's adopted mother and Darshan had a covert contract to kill Piumi for her daughter's heart revealed, a possessed Mayumi enters her adopted mother's room and suffocates her to death.

== Cast ==
- Shalani Tharaka as Mayumi Irugalbandara
- Dilhani Ekanayake as Piumi Irugalbandara
- Roshan Ranawana as Sithum
- Thisuri Yuwanika as Achini
- Buwani Chapa as Shakya
- Darshan Dharmaraj as Darshan
- Gihan Fernando as Saliya Irugalbandara
- Nimanthi Porage as Mayumi's adopted mother
- Givantha Arthasad as Vihanga
- Sandun Lakshitha as Kelum
- Mahendra Perera as Mahendra Sami
- Nilmini Kottegoda as Sami's wife

== Soundtrack ==
No.	Title	Singer(s)	Length
1.	"Me Ra Dilena"	Udaya Sri, Anupama Gunasekara
2.	"Oya Muwe Hasarel Soya"	Udaya Sri, Umaria Sinhawansa
3.	"Man Vinda Adare"	Umaria Sinhawansa
4.	"Thawa Dawasak Hamuwee"	Keerthi Pasquel
