= Springfield Municipal Opera =

- The Muni
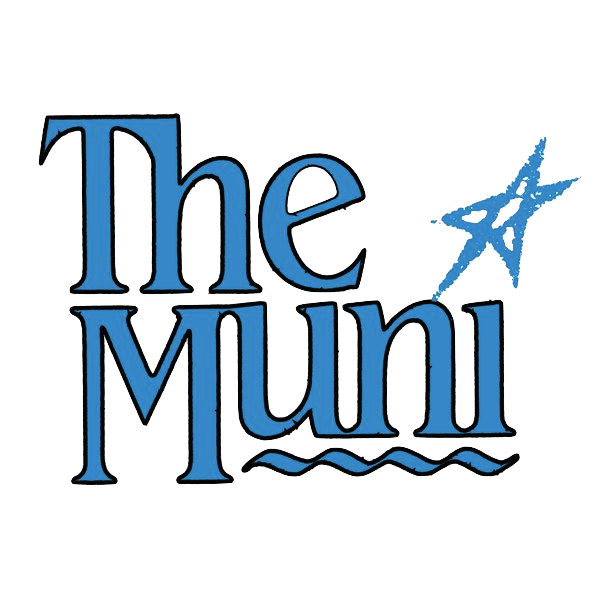
- Interactive map of Springfield Municipal Opera
- Location: 815 East Lake Drive; Springfield, illinois United States
- Coordinates: 39°44′30″N 89°34′47″W
- Seating type: Reserved/Lawn
- Capacity: 800+
- Type: Community Theater
- Event: Musical

Construction
- Opened: 1964

Website
- http://www.themuni.org/

Originally conceived on April 21, 1950 as a not-for-profit theatrical organization, the Springfield Municipal Opera Association transformed a 55-acre wheat field into an outdoor amphitheater. On June 17, 1950, nearly 3,000 people viewed the opening night performance of its first production, The Merry Widow.

The Muni flourished until a series of setbacks in the mid-1950s and a major fire in 1963 destroyed part of the facilities. A second fire the following year destroyed what was left.

With hopes for a rebirth, a test production of Bye Bye Birdie was staged in Douglas Park in 1964. The Springfield community responded with such enthusiasm that the Muni was able to rebuild its facility and return to the lake site theater in 1965. That year, over 6,000 patrons saw The Music Man and South Pacific.

In 1967, the Muni produced three shows; Brigadoon, Guys and Dolls and Camelot and attendance grew to 14,375. Muni bravely staged its first four-production season in 1972; You're a Good Man, Charlie Brown, 1776, The Most Happy Fella, The Sound of Music and attendance jumped to over 17,000.

In 2006, the Muni welcomed its one millionth patron during the run of Elton John and Tim Rice's Aida with a special celebration on July 29.

The Muni continues to produce four shows a season and has become one of the largest community theaters in the Midwest. It is believed to be the largest organization of this type in the country that is completely self-supporting, dependent neither on grants nor tax dollars.

== Springfield Municipal Opera Répertoire 1964-2025 ==
Here follows a list of the many shows that The Springfield Municipal Opera has presented in its summer seasons.

== Chronological Listing ==
=== 1964 ===
- Bye Bye, Birdie ^{0}

^0 Test production staged at Douglas Park to see if enough community interest could be generated to rebuild the old lake site after 2 fires wiped out the facilities

== 1960s ==
=== 1965 (Season 1) ===
- The Music Man
- South Pacific

=== 1966 (Season 2) ===
- My Fair Lady
- Pajama Game

=== 1967 (Season 3) ===
- Brigadoon
- Guys & Dolls
- Camelot

=== 1968 (Season 4) ===
- Unsinkable Molly Brown, The
- Oliver!
- Kiss Me, Kate

=== 1969 (Season 5) ===
- Bells Are Ringing
- Gypsy
- Annie Get Your Gun

== 1970s ==
=== 1970 (Season 6) ===
- Li'l Abner
- A Funny Thing Happened on the Way to the Forum
- Man of La Mancha

=== 1971 (Season 7) ===
- Funny Girl
- King and I, The
- Fiddler on the Roof

=== 1972 (Season 8) ===
- You're A Good Man, Charlie Brown
- 1776
- Most Happy Fella, The
- Sound of Music, The

=== 1973 (Season 9) ===
- Once Upon A Mattress
- Carnival!
- Promises, Promises
- Oklahoma!

=== 1974 (Season 10) ===
- On A Clear Day You Can See Forever
- Hello, Dolly!
- Applause
- Music Man, The

=== 1975 (Season 11) ===
- Guys & Dolls
- How To Succeed In Business (Without Really Trying)
- Fiddler On the Roof
- Mame

=== 1976 (Season 12) ===
- 1776^{1}
- Irene
- Bye Bye, Birdie
- Calamity Jane

^1Bicentennial production featuring Robert Alda as Benjamin Franklin and underwritten by Franklin Life Insurance Company. Many cast members of the 1972 production reprised their roles in this show.

=== 1977 (Season 13) ===
- Cinderella
- Desert Song, The
- West Side Story
- My Fair Lady

=== 1978 (Season 14) ===
- Sweet Charity
- Brigadoon
- Paint Your Wagon
- I Do! I Do!

=== 1979 (Season 15) ===
- Shenandoah
- No, No, Nanette^{2}
- Pajama Game, The
- Carousel

^2The Muni's 50th production

== 1980s ==
=== 1980 (Season 16) ===
- South Pacific
- Good News
- Gypsy
- Show Boat

=== 1981 (Season 17) ===
- Camelot
- Grease
- Oklahoma!
- A Little Night Music

=== 1982 (Season 18) ===
- Kismet
- George M!
- Oliver!
- Follies

=== 1983 (Season 19) ===
- King and I, The
- Joseph and the Amazing Technicolor® Dreamcoat
- Student Prince, The
- Hello, Dolly!

=== 1984 (Season 20) ===
- Peter Pan
- Funny Girl
- Two Gentlement of Verona
- Music Man, The

=== 1985 (Season 21) ===
- Annie
- Damn Yankees
- You're A Good Man, Charlie Brown
- Evita

=== 1986 (Season 22) ===
- Sound of Music, The
- Jesus Christ Superstar
- Cabaret
- Seven Brides for Seven Brothers

=== 1987 (Season 23) ===
- Annie Get Your Gun
- Wiz, The
- Promises, Promises
- Gigi

=== 1988 (Season 24) ===
- Peter Pan
- South Pacific
- 42nd Street
- Mame

=== 1989 (Season 25) ===
- Joseph and the Amazing Technicolor® Dreamcoat
- Fiddler on the Roof
- Singin' in the Rain
- My Fair Lady

== 1990s ==
=== 1990 (Season 26) ===
- Oklahoma!
- Teddy & Alice
- Anything Goes
- Camelot

=== 1991 (Season 27) ===
- Oliver!
- My One and Only
- Into the Woods
- Show Boat^{3}

^3The Muni's 100th production

=== 1992 (Season 28) ===
- Man of La Mancha
- Dreamgirls
- Me and My Girl
- Unsinkable Molly Brown, The

=== 1993 (Season 29) ===
- Hans Christian Andersen
- Sugar
- Pirates of Penzance, The^{4}
- Brigadoon

^4 The 1981 Joseph Papp revival version

=== 1994 (Season 30) ===
- Peter Pan
- Hello, Dolly!
- Big River
- Carousel

=== 1995 (Season 31) ===
- King and I, The
- Meet Me in St. Louis
- City of Angels
- Gypsy

=== 1996 (Season 32) ===
- Phantom
- Will Rogers Follies, The
- Little Me
- Wizard of Oz, The

=== 1997 (Season 33) ===
- Guys & Dolls
- Crazy for You
- Secret Garden, The
- Kiss Me, Kate

=== 1998 (Season 34) ===
- Fiddler on the Roof
- Bye Bye, Birdie
- Godspell
- Annie

=== 1999 (Season 35) ===
- State Fair
- 42nd Street
- Goodbye Girl, The
- Sound of Music, The

== 2000s ==
=== 2000 (Season 36) ===
- Cinderella
- Grease
- Children of Eden
- Music Man, The

=== 2001 (Season 37)^{5} ===
- How To Succeed In Business (Without Really Trying)
- A Little Night Music
- West Side Story
- Peter Pan

^5 First season without a Muni premiere production

=== 2002 (Season 38) ===
- Joseph and the Amazing Technicolor® Dreamcoat
- Anything Goes
- Mame
- South Pacific

=== 2003 (Season 39) ===
- Titanic
- Big
- My Fair Lady
- Wizard of Oz, The

=== 2004 (Season 40) ===
- Honk!
- Seven Brides for Seven Brothers^{6}
- A Chorus Line
- Big River

^6The Muni's 150th production

=== 2005 (Season 41) ===
- Sound of Music, The
- Ragtime
- Annie Get Your Gun
- Beauty and the Beast

=== 2006 (Season 42) ===
- Annie Warbucks
- Chicago
- Aida^{7}
- King and I, The

^7 The Muni welcomed its one millionth patron with a special celebration on July 29, 2006.

=== 2007 (Season 43) ===
- Miss Saigon
- Peter Pan
- Grease
- Oklahoma!

=== 2008 (Season 44) ===
- Hello, Dolly!
- All Shook Up
- Secret Garden, The
- Music Man, The

=== 2009 (Season 45) ===
- Oliver!
- Producers, The
- Fiddler on the Roof
- High School Musical

== 2010s ==
=== 2010 (Season 46) ===
- Seussical
- Into the Woods
- Jesus Christ Superstar
- Annie

=== 2011 (Season 47) ===
- Big River
- Guys & Dolls
- Hairspray
- Wizard of Oz, The

=== 2012 (Season 48) ===
- Joseph and the Amazing Technicolor® Dreamcoat
- Crazy for You
- Once On This Island
- Beauty and the Beast

=== 2013 (Season 49) ===
- Les Misérables
- Dreamgirls
- Peter Pan
- Rent

=== 2014 (Season 50) ===
- Sound of Music, The
- All Shook Up
- Shrek
- Jekyll & Hyde

=== 2015 (Season 51) ===
- Spamalot
- Seussical
- West Side Story
- Cabaret

=== 2016 (Season 52) ===
- South Pacific
- Sweeney Todd--The Demon Barber of Fleet Street
- Nice Work If You Can Get It
- Little Mermaid, The

=== 2017 (Season 53) ===
- Willy Wonka^{8}
- Mary Poppins
- White Christmas
- Grease

^8The Muni's 200th production at the lake site amphitheater

=== 2018 (Season 54) ===
- Little Shop of Horrors
- Sister Act
- Legally Blonde
- Annie

=== 2019 (Season 55) ===
- Peter Pan
- Evita
- Thoroughly Modern Millie
- The Wizard of Oz (1987 musical)

== 2020s ==
=== All Productions Postponed Until Summer of 2021 Due to the COVID-19 Pandemic ===
- The Addams Family
- Ragtime
- Mamma Mia!
- Matilda

=== All 4 shows cancelled for summer 2021 due to ongoing coronavirus pandemic ===
- The Addams Family
- Ragtime
- Mamma Mia!
- Matilda

=== 2022 (Season 58) ===
- SpongeBob Musical, The
- Ragtime
- Newsies
- Matilda

=== 2023 (Season 59) ===
- Fiddler on the Roof
- Rock of Ages
- Beauty and the Beast
- School of Rock

=== 2024 (Season 60) ===
- Jersey Boys
- Music Man, The
- Cinderella
- Little Mermaid, The

=== 2025 (Season 61 - promoted as 75th Anniversary Season) ===
- Something Rotten-- May 30-June 1, 4-7
- Hunchback of Notre Dame, The-- June 20-22, 25-28
- Oklahoma!-- July 11-13, 16-19
- Shrek-- August 1-3, 6-9

== Alphabetical Listing ==
- 1776-- 1972, 1976
- 42nd Street-- 1988, 1999
- A Chorus Line-- 2004
- A Funny Thing Happened on the Way to the Forum-- 1970
- A Little Night Music-- 1981, 2001
- Addams Family, The-- 2020 (Postponed), 2021 (Canceled)
- Aida-- 2006
- All Shook Up-- 2008, 2014
- Annie-- 1985, 1998, 2010, 2018
- Annie Get Your Gun-- 1969, 1987, 2005
- Annie Warbucks-- 2006
- Anything Goes-- 1990, 2002
- Applause-- 1974
- Beauty and the Beast-- 2005, 2012, 2023
- Bells Are Ringing-- 1969
- Big-- 2003
- Big River-- 1994, 2004, 2011
- Brigadoon-- 1967, 1978, 1993
- Bye Bye, Birdie-- 1964, 1976, 1998
- Cabaret-- 1986, 2015
- Calamity Jane-- 1976
- Camelot-- 1967, 1981, 1990
- Carnival!-- 1973
- Carousel-- 1979, 1994
- Chicago-- 2006
- Children of Eden-- 2000
- Cinderella-- 1977, 2000, 2024
- City of Angels-- 1995
- Crazy for You-- 1997, 2012
- Damn Yankees-- 1985
- Desert Song, The-- 1977
- Dreamgirls-- 1992, 2013
- Evita-- 1985, 2019
- Fiddler on the Roof-- 1971, 1975, 1989, 1998, 2009, 2023
- Follies-- 1982
- Funny Girl-- 1971, 1984
- George M!-- 1982
- Gigi-- 1987
- Godspell-- 1998
- Good News-- 1980
- Goodbye Girl, The-- 1999
- Grease-- 1981, 2000, 2007, 2017
- Guys & Dolls-- 1967, 1975, 1997, 2011
- Gypsy-- 1969, 1980, 1995
- Hairspray-- 2011
- Hans Christian Andersen-- 1993
- Hello, Dolly!-- 1974, 1983, 1994, 2008
- High School Musical-- 2009
- Honk!-- 2004
- How To Succeed In Business (Without Really Trying)-- 1975, 2001
- Hunchback of Notre Dame, The-- 2025
- I Do! I Do!-- 1978
- Into the Woods-- 1991, 2010
- Irene--1976
- Jekyll & Hyde--2014
- Jersey Boys--2024
- Jesus Christ Superstar-- 1986, 2010
- Joseph and the Amazing Technicolor® Dreamcoat-- 1983, 1989, 2002, 2012
- King and I, The-- 1971, 1983, 1995, 2006
- Kismet-- 1982
- Kiss Me, Kate-- 1968, 1997
- Legally Blonde-- 2018
- Les Misérables-- 2013
- Li'l Abner-- 1970
- Little Me-- 1996
- Little Mermaid, The-- 2016, 2024
- Little Shop of Horrors-- 2018
- Mamma Mia!-- 2020 (Postponed), 2021 (Canceled)
- Mame-- 1975, 1988, 2002
- Man of La Mancha-- 1970, 1992
- Mary Poppins-- 2017
- Matilda-- 2020 (Postponed), 2021 (Postponed), 2022
- Me and My Girl-- 1992
- Meet Me in St. Louis-- 1995
- Miss Saigon-- 2007
- Most Happy Fella, The-- 1972
- Music Man, The-- 1965, 1974, 1984, 2000, 2008, 2024
- My Fair Lady-- 1966, 1977, 1989, 2003
- My One and Only-- 1991
- Newsies-- 2022
- Nice Work If You Can Get It-- 2016
- No, No, Nanette-- 1979
- Oklahoma!-- 1973, 1981, 1990, 2007, 2025
- Oliver!-- 1968, 1982, 1991, 2009
- On a Clear Day You Can See Forever-- 1974
- Once On This Island-- 2012
- Once Upon a Mattress-- 1973
- Paint Your Wagon-- 1978
- Pajama Game, The-- 1966, 1979
- Peter Pan-- 1984, 1988, 1994, 2001, 2007, 2013, 2019
- Phantom-- 1996
- Pirates of Penzance, The-- 1993
- Producers, The-- 2009
- Promises, Promises-- 1973, 1987
- Ragtime-- 2005, 2020 (Postponed), 2021 (Postponed), 2022
- Rent-- 2013
- Rock of Ages,-- 2023
- School of Rock,-- 2023
- Secret Garden, The-- 1997, 2008
- Seussical-- 2010, 2015
- Seven Brides for Seven Brothers-- 1986, 2004
- Shenandoah-- 1979
- Show Boat-- 1980, 1991
- Shrek-- 2014, 2025
- Singin' in the Rain-- 1989
- Sister Act-- 2018
- Something Rotten!-- 2025
- Sound of Music, The-- 1972, 1986, 1999, 2005, 2014
- South Pacific-- 1965, 1980, 1988, 2002, 2016
- Spamalot-- 2015
- SpongeBob Musical, The-- 2022
- State Fair-- 1999
- Student Prince, The-- 1983
- Sugar-- 1993
- Sweeney Todd--The Demon Barber of Fleet Street-- 2016
- Sweet Charity-- 1978
- Teddy & Alice-- 1990
- Thoroughly Modern Millie-- 2019
- Titanic-- 2003
- Two Gentlemen of Verona-- 1984
- Unsinkable Molly Brown, The-- 1968, 1992
- West Side Story-- 1977, 2001, 2015
- White Christmas-- 2017
- Will Rogers Follies, The-- 1996
- Willy Wonka-- 2017
- Wiz, The-- 1987
- Wizard of Oz, The-- 1996, 2003, 2011, 2019
- You're A Good Man, Charlie Brown-- 1972, 1985

== See also ==
- List of contemporary amphitheaters

== Sources ==
- Programs from recent Muni Opera productions
