= Janaka Kanchana =

Sri Lankan Guinness world record

- Born: Janaka Kanchana Mudunnayake; Hanguranketha, Sri Lanka
- Known for: Guinness world record for bending iron rods and breaking concrete slabs

Janaka Kanchana Mudunnayake is a Sri Lankan Guinness world record holder who also currently works as an employee at Sri Lanka Ports Authority. He also took part in the Sri Lanka's Youth with Talent and became the winner of the contest in 2018. On 21 February 2018, he broke the Guinness World Record by bending twenty two steel rods of 12mm within 48 seconds. The previous record was held by Armenian Amen Adams who bent 18 steel rods within a minute.

On 4 April 2019, he set another world record by breaking 50 concrete slabs on his chest within five minutes and 40 seconds. In January 2016, he aimed for a world record by allowing 10 double cabs to drive over his stomach, but the attempt was unsuccessful.
