= Kanchan =

Kanchan may refer to:

== Surname ==
- Ilias Kanchan, Bangladeshi film actor

== Given name ==
- Kanchan, stage name of Kumari Kanchan Dinkerao Mail (1950–2004), Indian singer with Babla & Kanchan
- Kanchan (actress) (born 1970), Indian entertainer and model
- Kanchan Awasthi, Indian entertainer and model
- Kanchan Chaudhary Bhattacharya (1947–2019), Indian Police Service officer
- Kanchan Mullick, Bengali actor
- Kanchan Prava Devi, regent of Tripura from 1947 to 1949

== Other ==
- Kanchana (disambiguation)
- Kanchan Kanya Express, a train route on Indian Railways
- Kanchan armour, a modular composite armour
- Uruli Kanchan, village near Pune, Maharashtra, India
- Kanchan, a character portrayed by Radhika Apte in the 2015 Indian film Badlapur
