= Kanchana =

Kanchana may refer to:

- Kanchana (1952 film), 1952 Indian drama film produced in Telugu, Malayalam and Tamil languages
- Kanchana (film series), a Tamil language horror comedy film series.
  - Kanchana (2011 film), 2011 Indian Tamil horror comedy film directed by Raghava Lawrence, second part of the Kanchana film series
  - Kanchana 2, 2015 sequel to the above by Lawrence, third part of the series
  - Kanchana 3, 2019 film, fourth part of the series
  - Kanchana 4, 2026 film, fifth part of the series
- Kanchana (2012 TV series), a 2012 Indian Tamil-language soap opera that aired in Vijay TV
- Kanchana (2015 TV series), the Tamil-language version of the Indian television series Shastri Sisters, that aired on Raj TV in 2015
- Kanchana Returns, Hindi title of the 2017 Indian Tamil-language film Shivalinga
- Kanchana: The Wonder Car, Hindi title of the 2017 Indian Tamil-language film Dora
- Kanchana 3, Hindi title of the 2017 Indian Telugu-language film Anando Brahma
- Kanchana 4, Hindi title of the 2019 Indian Telugu-language film Raju Gari Gadhi 3
- Unicorn-Kanchana, British record label

== See also ==
- Kanchan (disambiguation)
- Kanchana (name), for people with the name
- Muni (disambiguation)
