= Kanchanpur, Rohtas =

Kanchanpur
- village
- Location in Bihar, India Kanchanpur (India)
- Coordinates: 24°48′0″N 84°15′0″E
- Country: India
- State: Bihar
- District: Rohtas

Area
  - Total: 4.8 km^{2} (1.9 sq mi)
- Elevation: 110 m (360 ft)

Population (2011)
  - Total: 2,865
  - Density: 600/km^{2} (1,500/sq mi)

Languages
  - Official: Bhojpuri Language, Hindi
- Time zone: UTC+5:30 (IST)
- PIN: 821305
- ISO 3166 code: IN-BR
- National Highway 2](WestBengal To Delhi) city: sasaram
- Literacy: 95%
- Lok Sabha constituency: sasaram
- Vidhan Sabha constituency: sasaram

Kanchanpur is a small village located in Rohtas district, Bihar state, India. It is near the National Highway 2. As of the year 2011, it had a total population of 2,865.

== Geography ==
Kanchanpur is situated on the south of Indrapuri Barrange Canal, about 36 kilometres southeast of the district seat Sasaram. It covers a total area of 480 hectares.
