= Youth with Talent =

Sri Lankan reality talent show

Youth with Talent is a Sri Lankan reality show that has been airing on ITN (Independent Television Network) since 2016. It was the first Sri Lankan reality talent show.

ITN initiated and executed Youth with Talent with assistance from the National Youth Services Council (NYSC). It was created and by Sandaruwan Jayawickrama, a musical and tele-drama director.

Youths between the ages of 15 – 35 participate in the contest to showcase their talents. The objective is to bring them to the international level and to make their dreams a reality. The main theme of the contest is, "If determination is, the victory – Talent should be extraordinary.”

Youth with Talent 2016 was judged by a panel of judges who voted on every round except the finale which was concluded by the judges and the final round was open to public vote. This selection methodology continues in the next seasons. Some of the acts include singing, dancing, acting, acrobatics, martial arts, and gymnastics.

== Rounds ==
=== Auditions ===
Approximately twenty acts participate in each episode. About seven of those acts are chosen to compete in Round 2. The acts are chosen by the judges, without any input from the public.

=== Challenge round ===
This round is open to acts who were eliminated during the auditions. They have a chance to showcase their talent again, and the judges select a couple more acts to move on to Round 2.

=== Round 2 ===
Each round has a guest judge. Together with the main panel of judges, they determine which acts compete in the semi-finals.

=== Semi-finals ===
Only two semi-final rounds are held. Acts chosen from Round 2 compete against one another, and five of those acts are chosen to compete in the Grand Finale in each episode.

=== Wild card round ===
One more act is chosen from those eliminated during the semi-finals, to compete in the Grand Finale.

=== Grand finale round ===
Eleven acts compete against each other and only the top three are awarded. The top three acts are chosen based on the judges' vote and the public vote.
