= Crimea Music Fest =

Ukrainian music festival

Crimea Music Fest (Krym Music Fest) is an International Music Festival and International Vocal Competition, which took place in Yalta (Crimea, Ukraine). Young performers from all 5 continents (Eurasia, Africa, South America, North America, Australia) of the world took part in the festival. The headliners of the festival were Ruslana, Goran Bregovic, Sergey Lazarev, and other popular performers from Eastern Europe and Central Asia. The patroness of the festival was Alla Pugacheva. The festival took place in 2011 and 2012. The festival was shortlisted for the ZD Awards in the event of the year category.

== The first festival (2011) ==
Held from September 6 till September 10, 2011. Representatives from 19 different countries of five continents participated in competition program of the first festival. Participants age limit was from 18 till 30 years old inclusive. Each contestant presented two songs – the first performance was in the ethnic style representing national peculiarities of the contestants native country. The participants represented the world-famous hits during the second performance. The jury chairperson of the contest is Sophia Rotaru, People's Artist of three countries (Ukraine, Russia, Moldova). Members of the International Jury: co-chairman Valery Leontiev (Russia), co-chairman Gloria Gaynor (USA), Alexander Bard (Sweden), Demis Roussos (Greece), Erol Yaras (Turkey), Antero Payvalaynen (Finland). Grand Prix of the festival and the first prize of USD100, 000 were awarded to Carolina Soto from Chile. The 2nd place won the participant Nikhil D'Souza (India), the third place jury awarded to the sisters Umara Sinhawansa and Umaria Sinhawansa(Sri Lanka). The Art Director of the festival Alla Pugacheva awarded "Alla`s star" to Rin'Go band (Kazakhstan).

== The second festival (2012) ==
Scheduled from August 28 till September 1, 2012. The selection of contestants has been on since December 1, 2011. The 2012 festival featured performers from Ukraine, Belarus, Russia and other countries of Eastern Europe and Central Asia. This time the winner was determined by the audience's votes. The winners of the 2012 competition were the Ukrainian pop group Unreal. Their hit Love is War.

== Founders of the festival ==
Festival Art Director is Alla Pugacheva, a singer. General Producer – Valentina Basovskaya, who has been working over Alla Pugachevas Ukrainian projects (musical "Chasing Two Hares" Pugachevas recitals in Ukraine, "Christmas Meeting" in Kyiv in 2009 and others) for a long time. The organizer of the festival is Krymfest LLC. The total prize fund of the contest is USD 200,000. The festival management is located in Kyiv.
