= Sri Lanka's Got Talent season 1 =

Sri Lanka's Got Talent
- Season 1
- Hosted by: Dasun Madushan; Piyath Rajapaksa
- Judges: Jackson Anthony; Soundarie David Rodrigo; Tillakaratne Dilshan; Lahiru Perera (guest); Dilhani Ekanayake (guest); Bathiya Jayakody (guest); Pubudu Chathuranga (guest)
- Winner: Angampora Pool
- Runners-up: Nimna Hiranya; Nipuni Sithara
- No. of episodes: 28

Release
- Original network: Sirasa TV
- Original release: 18 March – 30 September 2018

Season chronology
- Next → Season 2

The first season of Sri Lankan talent show competition series Sri Lanka's Got Talent was broadcast on Sirasa TV from 3 March to 30 September 2018. The judge board included Jackson Anthony, Soundarie David Rodrigo and Tillakaratne Dilshan with Lahiru Perera, Dilhani Ekanayake, Bathiya Jayakody and Pubudu Chathuranga serving as the guest judges for each semifinal respectively.

The season was won by the Angampora Pool of the Sri Lanka Air Force, with the fast mental arithmetic act Nimna Hiranya coming in second and the fire dance act Nipuni Sithara placing third.

== Production ==
The preliminary rounds took place at 3 locations in 2017, 30 October - 1 November at E. L. Senanayake premises, Kandy, 11 - 12 November at Mahinda College, Galle and 24 - 26 November at Stein Studios, Colombo. The rest of the season was also held at Stein Studios. The season premiered on 18 March 2018 at 9 p.m in Sirasa TV. Quarterfinals were held from 17 June 2018. Lahiru Perera, Dilhani Ekanayake, Bathiya Jayakody from the music duo Bathiya and Santhush and Pubudu Chathuranga were the 4 guest judges in the semifinals respectively. The Pre Finale was held on 9 and 16 September 2018. The Grand Finale was held on 30 September 2018.

== Season overview ==
The chart below lists the results of each participant's overall performance in this season,

Winner | Runner-up | Third place | Finalist | Pre Finalist | Semifinalist | Quarterfinalist
Golden Buzzered Quarterfinalist | Wildcard Quarterfinalist | Judge decided Pre Finalist

Participant	Age(s)	Genre	Act	From	Quarterfinal	Result
Angampora Pool	22-33	Dance	Traditional Angampora Dance	Sri Lanka Air Force	6	Winner
Anish Wijesinghe	22	Music	Guitarist	Colombo	3	Eliminated
Asanka Ruwan	38	Variety	Circus/comedy	Kurunegala	8	Eliminated
B.K. Dancing Crew	11-27	Dance	UV Dance group	Kiribathgoda	4	Semifinalist
Bashith Ranaveera	27	Variety	Statue Sculpture	Polgahawela	3	Eliminated
Beat Bullets	16-22	Dance	Hip-hop dance group	Ratmalana	8	Eliminated
Blaze Beatbox Team	18-19	Singing	Beatbox	Ratmalana	6	Eliminated
Dhulan Weerasinghe & Team	21	Dance	Story-dance group	Naththandiya	3	Eliminated
Digital Ramod with cool step	15-25	Dance	Hip-hop dance group	Negombo	2	Semifinalist
Dinidu Chinthaka	21	Danger	Threewil stunt	Kuliyapitiya	6	Eliminated
Dinusha Bandara	11	Variety	Artist	Wattala	5	Eliminated
Duminda Amarasiri	40	Danger	Car stunt	Homagama	8	Semifinalist
Ganga Sithara	15	Dance	Traditional Raban Dance	kimbulapitiya	3	Eliminated
Hannibal the magic warrior	27	Magic	Close-up magician	Kottawa	1	Eliminated
Indika Marasinghe	32	Variety	Cocktail act	Dambulla	5	Eliminated
Lahiru Maduranga	25	Dance	Traditional Fire dancer	Galle	8	Pre Finalist
Lakshitha Deshan	8	Variety	Acting	Rabukkana	1	Pre Finalist
Litansiya Dancing Crew	20-33	Dance	Shadow dance group	Pannala	5	Eliminated
M.G. Suminda	40 & 35	Danger	Circus act	Matale	7	Pre Finalist
Minimi Samarawickrama	21	Singing	Rapper	Nawalapitiya	2	Eliminated
MY Boys Team	21-34	Danger	Stunt Act	Kurunegala	4	Semifinalist
N.S. Wageshan	37	Music	Musician	Wellawatte	7	Semifinalist
Nadeesha Abegunawardane	29	Singing	Singer	Galle	2	Semifinalist
Nafaz Sheriff	27	Dance	Hip-hop dancer	Panadura	2	Semifinalist
Nimal Nuwarage	50	Danger	Extreme Danger	Galaha	6	Semifinalist
Nimna Hiranya	11	Variety	Fast Mental Arithmetic	Kiribathgoda	1	Runner-up
Nipuni Sithara	17	Dance	Traditional fire dancer	Galle	5	3rd place
Nuwan De Silva	32	Magic	Stage magician	Kadawatha	6	Pre Finalist
Osindu Nayanajith	14	Variety	Rubic-Cube solver	Galewala	1	Finalist
Pipena Kekulu Rollerskating Team	6-16	Variety	Rollerskating	Kottawa	5	Eliminated
Raveendra Kumara	12	Danger	Balancing	Rathgama	6	Eliminated
Rifki & Zareek	22 & 26	Variety	Artists	Gampola	2	Eliminated
Ruban & Blackie	69 & 9	Animal	Arithmetic dog act	Madampe	3	Eliminated
Saliya Sandaruwan & Team	6,36 & 40	Danger	Extreme danger	Wellawaya	7	Eliminated
Saman Pradeep	32	Danger	Balance	Kurunegala	2	Eliminated
Stick it Crew	18-23	Dance	Hip-hop dance group	Maharagama	6	Eliminated
Sugath Kamal & Chandana Prabash	31 & 46	Danger	Extreme danger	Bakamuna	2	Eliminated
Sumangala Silva	49	Magic	Stage magician	Kalutara	4	Semifinalist
Sunil Shantha	56	Danger	Piercing act	Pelmadulla	4	Eliminated
Susantha Perera	39	Danger	Karate	Kandy	7	Eliminated
Swasthi Percussion Team	20-25	Music	Drum team	Kotte	8	Semifinalist
Team 90 Degrees	26-28	Danger	Bike Stunt	Hunupitiya	5	Semifinalist
Team Chakrayuda	11-19	Dance	Traditional dance group	Panadura	7	Eliminated
Tharindu Namal	22	Danger	Contortionist	Ampara	1	Eliminated
Three	17-19	Singing	Vocal group	Malabe	5	Finalist
Thilina Egodage	24	Magic	Close-up magician	Ambalangoda	7	Finalist
Torrential Dancing Group	20-30	Dance	Dance group	Ratmalana	1	Eliminated
U.D.D. Sampath (& STF)	32	Dance	Traditional Angampora dance	Bulathsinhala	8	Pre Finalist
Vihan Malitha	19	Magic	Close-up magician	Talawathugoda	8	Eliminated
Vinusha and Krithvi	21 & 20	Dance	Barathanatyam	Kotahena	4	Eliminated
Wasantha Weerarathne	35	Danger	Balancing act	Rikillagaskanda	4	Eliminated
Wave Dance Studio	22-25	Dance	Hip-hop dance group	Batticaloa	3	Eliminated
White Fairies Montessori	4-5	Dance	Acrobatic dance group	Kandy	4	Pre Finalist
Wijeya Ilangakon	73	Animal	Parrot tricks	Gampola	7	Semifinalist
Wishwa Punchihewa	20	Dance	Multimedia Dancer	Balapitiya	1	Eliminated
Yoshitha Premarathna	22	Music	Saxophonist	Kelaniya	3	Eliminated

== Quarterfinals summary ==
Key	Golden Buzzer (Auditions)	Buzzed	Won Judge's Vote	Lost Judge's Vote	Advanced (Won Judge's Choice)	Eliminated (Lost Judge's Choice)

=== Quarterfinal 1 (17 June) ===
Quarter-Finalist	Order	Act	Buzzes and judges' votes			Finished	Result
Quarter-Finalist	Order	Act	Jackson	Soundarie	Dilshan	Finished	Result
Nimna Hiranya	1	Fast Mental Arithmetic				1st	Advanced
Tharindu Namal	2	Contortionist				7th	Eliminated
Osindu Nayanajith	3	Rubic-Cube Solving				2nd	Advanced
Lakshitha Deshan	4	Acting				3rd	Advanced
Wishwa Punchihewa	5	Multimedia dance				5th	Eliminated
Hannibal the magic warrior	6	Close-up magician				4th	Eliminated
Torrential Dancing group	7	Traditional Dance				6th	Eliminated

=== Quarterfinal 2 (24 June) ===
Quarter-Finalist	Order	Act	Buzzes and judges' votes			Finished	Result
Quarter-Finalist	Order	Act	Jackson	Soundarie	Dilshan	Finished	Result
Rifki and Zareek	1	Artistic drawing				4th	Eliminated
Minimi Samarawickrama	2	Rap song				6th	Eliminated
Digital Ramod with cool step	3	Multimedia dance				3rd	Advanced
Sugath & Chandana	4	Extreme danger				5th	Eliminated
Nafaz Sheriff	5	Turbo Dance				1st	Advanced
Saman Pradeep	6	Balance				7th	Eliminated
Nadeesha Abegunawardane	7	Singing				2nd	Advanced

=== Quarterfinal 3 (1 July) ===
Quarter-Finalist	Order	Act	Buzzes and judges' votes			Finished	Result
Quarter-Finalist	Order	Act	Jackson	Soundarie	Dilshan	Finished	Result
Yoshitha Premarathna	1	Saxophonist				6th	Eliminated
Wave Dance Studio	2	Hip-hop dance				5th	Eliminated
Bashith Ranaveera	3	Statue Sculpturing				3rd	Eliminated
Ruban & Blackie	4	Dog tricks				2nd	Eliminated
Dhulan Weerasinghe & Team	5	Story dance				1st	Eliminated
Ganga Sithara	6	Raban Dance				4th	Eliminated
Anish Wijesinghe	7	Guitarist				7th	Eliminated

- Even though the judge board have to send three contestants to the next round, the judge's denied this decision and eliminated all acts in this quarterfinal saying that they were not satisfied with their performances unlike in the acts of the previous two quarterfinals.

=== Quarterfinal 4 (8 July) ===
Quarter-Finalist	Order	Act	Buzzes and judges' votes			Finished	Result
Quarter-Finalist	Order	Act	Jackson	Soundarie	Dilshan	Finished	Result
White Fairs Montessori	1	Acrobatic dance				2nd	Advanced
Sumangala Silva	2	Stage magic				3rd	Advanced
MY Boys Team	3	Bike Stunt				4th	Advanced
Wasantha Weerarathne	4	Balance & Circus				5th	eliminated
Vinusha and Krithvi	5	Barathanatyam				6th	Eliminated
Sunil Shantha	6	Snake Swallowing				7th	Eliminated
B.K. Dancing Crew	7	Light Dance group				1st	Advanced

- The judge board chose a 4th act in this quarterfinal to fill the missing spots in the semifinal due to elimination of all contestants in the 3rd quarterfinals.

=== Quarterfinal 5 (15 July) ===
Quarter-Finalist	Order	Act	Buzzes and judges' votes			Finished	Result
Quarter-Finalist	Order	Act	Jackson	Soundarie	Dilshan	Finished	Result
Pipena Kekulu Rollerskating	1	Rollerskating				5th	Eliminated
Three	2	Vocal group				1st	Advanced
Nipuni Sithara	3	Traditional Kandyan dance				3rd	Advanced
Dinusha Bandara	4	Artist				7th	Eliminated
Indika Marasinghe	5	Cocktail act				6th	Eliminated
Team 90 degrees	6	Bike Stunt				2nd	Advanced
Litansiya Dancing Crew	7	Shadow Theater Dance				4th	Eliminated

=== Quarterfinal 6 (22 July) ===
Quarter-Finalist	Order	Act	Buzzes and judges' votes			Finished	Result
Quarter-Finalist	Order	Act	Jackson	Soundarie	Dilshan	Finished	Result
Stick it Crew	1	Fire Dance				5th	Eliminated
Nuwan De Silva	2	Stage magician				2nd	Advanced
Nimal Nuwarage	3	Extreme Danger				3rd	Advanced
Angampora Pool	4	Angampora dance				1st	Advanced
Raveendra Kumara	5	Hand Balancing				7th	Eliminated
Dinidu Chinthaka	6	Threewil Stunt				4th	Eliminated
Blaze Beatbox team	7	Beatbox				6th	Eliminated

=== Quarterfinal 7 (29 July) ===
Quarter-Finalist	Order	Act	Buzzes and judges' votes			Finished	Result
Quarter-Finalist	Order	Act	Jackson	Soundarie	Dilshan	Finished	Result
N.S. Wageshan	1	Sita music				4th	Advanced
Team Chakrayuda	2	Traditional Dance				7th	Eliminated
Wijeya Ilangakon	3	Parrot tricks				2nd	Advanced
Thilina Egodage	4	Rubic Cube Magic				1st	Advanced
Saliya Sandaruwan & Team	5	Extreme danger				5th	Eliminated
M.G. Suminda	6	Circus				3rd	Advanced
Susantha Perera	7	Karate				6th	Eliminated

- The judge board chose 4 contestants in this round to advance to the semifinals in order to fill the vacant three spots due to all contestants being eliminated in 3.

=== Quarterfinal 8 (5 August) ===
Quarter-Finalist	Order	Act	Buzzes and judges' votes			Finished	Result
Quarter-Finalist	Order	Act	Jackson	Soundarie	Dilshan	Finished	Result
Swasthi Percussion Team	1	Drum music				4th	Advanced
Beat Bullets	2	Hip hop dance				6th	Eliminated
Duminda Amarasiri	3	Car stunt				2nd	Advanced
Asanka Ruwan	4	Circus/Comedy				5th	Eliminated
Lahiru Maduranga	5	Traditional fire dance				3rd	Advanced
U.D.D. Sampath (& STF)	6	Angampora dance				1st	Advanced
Vihan Malitha	7	Close-up magic				7th	Eliminated

- The judge board chose 4 contestants in this round to advance to the semifinals in order to fill the vacant three spots due to all contestants being eliminated in 3.

== Semifinals summary ==
- In each Semifinal, 6 acts participated, where one act immediately advanced to the finals based upon judge board decision. Two more acts advanced to the finals based upon public vote.

Key	Golden Buzzer (Auditions)	Buzzed	Judges' decision	Advanced immediately	Advanced (Won Public Vote)	Eliminated (Lost Public Vote)

=== Semifinal 1 (12 August) ===
Lahiru Perera acted as a guest judge in this semifinal. Nipuni Sithara won the judges decision to advance immediately to the pre final round of the competition.

Semi-Finalist	Order	Act	Buzzes and judges' votes			Finished	Result
Semi-Finalist	Order	Act	Jackson	Soundarie	Dilshan	Finished	Result
Digital Ramod with cool step	1	Hip-hop dance				6th	Eliminated (Lost Public Vote)
Three	2	Vocal group				3rd	Advanced (Won Public Vote)
Nipuni Sithara	3	Fire dance				1st	Advanced immediately
Thilina Egodage	4	Rubic-Cube magic				2nd	Advanced (Won Public Vote)
Nimal Nuwarage	5	Extreme danger				4th	Eliminated (Lost Public Vote)
Sumangala Silva	6	Stage magic				5th	Eliminated (Lost Public Vote)

=== Semifinal 2 (19 August) ===
Dilhani Ekanayake acted as a guest judge in this semifinal. Angampora pool won the judge's decision in this semifinals to immediately advance to the Pre Finals.

Semi-Finalist	Order	Act	Buzzes and judges' votes			Finished	Result
Semi-Finalist	Order	Act	Jackson	Soundarie	Dilshan	Finished	Result
White Fairies Montessori	1	Acrobatic dance				3rd	Advanced (Won Public Vote)
Nimna Hiranya	2	Fast Mental Arithmetic				2nd	Advanced (Won Public Vote)
Angampora Pool	3	Angampora dance				1st	Advanced immediately
Nadeesha Abegunawardane	4	Singer				4th	Eliminated (Lost Public Vote)
Team 90 degrees	5	Bike Stunt				6th	Eliminated (Lost Public Vote)
Nafaz Sheriff	6	Turbo Dance				5th	Eliminated (Lost Public Vote)

=== Semifinal 3 (26 August) ===
Bathiya Jayakody acted as a guest judge in this semifinal. The Judges' decision was won by M.G. Suminda to immediately advance to the Pre-final round.

Semi-Finalist	Order	Act	Buzzes and judges' votes			Finished	Result
Semi-Finalist	Order	Act	Jackson	Soundarie	Dilshan	Finished	Result
B.K. Dancing Crew	1	Hip-hop dance				4th	Eliminated (Lost Public Vote)
Nuwan De Silva	2	Close up magician				2nd	Advanced (Won Public Vote)
Swasthi Percussion Team	3	Drum music				6th	Eliminated (Lost Public Vote)
Lakshitha Deshan	4	Acting				3rd	Advanced (Won Public Vote)
MY Boys Team	5	Bike Stunt				5th	Eliminated (Lost Public Vote)
M.G.Suminda	6	Circus act				1st	Advanced immediately

=== Semifinal 4 (2 September) ===
Pubudu Chathuranga acted as a guest judge in this semifinal. The Judges' decision was won by Osindu Nayanajith to immediately advance to the Pre-final round.

Semi-Finalist	Order	Act	Buzzes and judges' votes			Finished	Result
Semi-Finalist	Order	Act	Jackson	Soundarie	Dilshan	Finished	Result
N.S. Wageshan	1	Sita Music				6th	Eliminated (Lost Public Vote)
Duminda Amarasiri	2	Car Stunt				4th	Eliminated (Lost Public Vote)
Osindu Nayanajith	3	Rubic-Cube Solving				1st	Advanced immediately
Lahiru Maduranga	4	Fire Dance				3rd	Advanced (Won Public Vote)
Wijeya Ilangakon	5	Parrot Tricks				5th	Eliminated (Lost Public Vote)
U.D.D. Sampath (& STF)	6	Angampora dance				2nd	Advanced (Won Public Vote)

== Pre Finale ==
The twelve acts which advanced from the Semifinals competed against each other to advance to the Grand Finale. In each episode six acts participated. After all twelve acts have showcased their performance, the judge board chose six contestants to advance into the Grand Finale (Top 6).

None of the acts were buzzed in both episodes.

Key	Golden Buzzer (Auditions)	Judges' Decision (Semifinals)	Standing Ovation (Judges/Audience)	Criticized Performance	Judges' Vote	Advanced (Won Judges' Vote)	Eliminated (Lost Judges' Vote)

=== Pre Finale – episode 1 (9 September) ===
Pre-Finalist	Order	Act	Buzzes and judges' votes			Audience	Finished	Result
Pre-Finalist	Order	Act	Jackson	Soundarie	Dilshan	Audience	Finished	Result
Little Fairies Montessori	1	Acrobatic dance					8th	Eliminated (Lost Judges' Vote)
Nuwan De Silva	2	Close Up magician					12th	Eliminated (Lost Judges' Vote)
Lakshitha Deshan	3	Acting					10th	Eliminated (Lost Judges' Vote)
Osindu Nayanajith	4	Rubic Cube Solving					1st	Advanced (Won Judges' Vote)
Nipuni Sithara	5	Fire Dance					6th	Advanced (Won Judges' Vote)
U.D.D. Sampath (& STF)	6	Angampora dance					7th	Eliminated (Lost Judges' Vote)

=== Pre Finale – episode 2 (16 September) ===
Pre-Finalist	Order	Act	Buzzes and judges' votes			Audience	Finished	Result
Pre-Finalist	Order	Act	Jackson	Soundarie	Dilshan	Audience	Finished	Result
Three	1	Vocal group					3rd	Advanced (Won Judges' Vote)
Thilina Egodage	2	Close up magic					5th	Advanced (Won Judges' Vote)
M.G. Suminda	3	Circus act					11th	Eliminated (Lost Judges' Vote)
Nimna Hiranya	4	Fast Mental Arithmetic					4th	Advanced (Won Judges' Vote)
Angampora Pool	5	Angampora dance					2nd	Advanced (Won Judges' Vote)
Lahiru Maduranga	6	Fire dance					9th	Eliminated (Lost Judges' Vote)

=== Pre Finale summary ===
Pre Finalist	Act type	Position			
Pre Finalist	Act type	Position	Nuwan De Silva	Close up Magician	12th (Eliminated)
M.G. Suminda	Circus Act	11th (Eliminated)			
Lakshitha Deshan	Acting	10th (Eliminated)			
Lahiru Maduranga	Traditional Fire Dancer	9th (Eliminated)			
Little Fairies Montessori	Acrobatic Dance group	8th (Eliminated)			
U.D.D. Sampath (& STF)	Traditional Angampora dance group	7th (Eliminated)			
Nipuni Sithara	Traditional Fire Dancer	6th (Advanced)			
Thilina Egodage	Rubic Cube Magician	5th (Advanced)			
Nimna Hiranya	Fast Mental Arithmetic act	4th (Advanced)			
Three	Vocal group	3rd (Advanced)			
Angampora Pool	Traditional Angampora dance group	2nd (Advanced)			
Osindu Nayanajith	Rubic Cube Solving act	1st (Advanced)			

== Grand Finale ==
The Live Grand Finale was held on 30 September 2018. The 6 acts which advanced competed against each other to win the title. No acts were buzzed in the Grand Finale. The acts were given a score of 50% from the judge board and 50% from the public vote.

Key	Golden Buzzer (Auditions)	Judges' Decision (Semifinals)	Advanced	Bottom three

Finalist	Order	Act	Result				
Finalist	Order	Act	Result	Nimna Hiranya	1	Fast mental arithmetic act	Advanced
Thilina Egodage	2	Rubic Cube magician	Bottom 3				
Osindu Nayanajith	3	Rubic Cube Solving act	Bottom 3				
Nipuni Sithara	4	Traditional fire dance	Advanced				
Angampora pool	5	Traditional Angampora dance	Advanced				
Three	6	Vocal group	Bottom 3				

=== Finale standings ===
Bottom 3
Key	4th Place	5th Place	6th Place

Finalist	Act	Result			
Finalist	Act	Result	Osindu Nayanajith	Rubic Cube Solving act	6th Place
Thilina Egodage	Rubic Cube magician	5th Place			
Three	Vocal group	4th Place			

Top 3
Key	Winner	Runner-up	3rd Place

Finalist	Act	Result			
Finalist	Act	Result	Nipuni Sithara	Traditional fire dance	3rd Place
Nimna Hiranya	Fast mental arithmetic act	Runner-up			
Angampora pool	Traditional Angampora dance	Winner			

== Ratings ==
Episode	Title	First air date	Timeslot (SLST)
1	Auditions Week 1	18 March, 2018	Sunday 9:00 pm
2	Auditions Week 2	25 March, 2018	Sunday 9:00 pm
3	Auditions Week 3	1 April, 2018	Sunday 9:00 pm
4	Auditions Week 4	8 April, 2018	Sunday 9:00 pm
5	Auditions Week 5	15 April, 2018	Sunday 9:00 pm
6	Auditions Week 6	22 April, 2018	Sunday 9:00 pm
7	Auditions Week 7	29 April, 2018	Sunday 9:00 pm
8	Auditions Week 8	6 May, 2018	Sunday 9:00 pm
9	Auditions Week 9	13 May, 2018	Sunday 9:00 pm
10	Auditions Week 10	20 May, 2018	Sunday 9:00 pm
11	Auditions Week 11	27 May, 2018	Sunday 9:00 pm
12	Auditions Week 12	3 June, 2018	Sunday 9:00 pm
13	Auditions Week 13	10 June, 2018	Sunday 9:00 pm
14	Quarterfinals, Week 1	17 June, 2018	Sunday 9:00 pm
15	Quarterfinals, Week 2	24 June, 2018	Sunday 9:00 pm
16	Quarterfinals, Week 3	1 July, 2018	Sunday 9:00 pm
17	Quarterfinals, Week 4	8 July, 2018	Sunday 9:00 pm
18	Quarterfinals, Week 5	15 July, 2018	Sunday 9:00 pm
19	Quarterfinals, Week 6	22 July, 2018	Sunday 9:00 pm
20	Quarterfinals, Week 7	29 July, 2018	Sunday 9:00 pm
21	Quarterfinals, Week 8	5 August, 2018	Sunday 9:00 pm
22	Semifinals, Week 1	12 August, 2018	Sunday 9:00 pm
23	Semifinals, Week 2	19 August, 2018	Sunday 9:00 pm
24	Semifinals, Week 3	26 August, 2018	Sunday 9:00 pm
25	Semifinals, Week 4	2 September, 2018	Sunday 9:00 pm
26	Pre Finale – episode 1	9 September, 2018	Sunday 9:00 pm
27	Pre Finale – episode 2	16 September, 2018	Sunday 9:00 pm
28	Grand Finale	30 September, 2018	Sunday 9:00 pm
