= Children's Park =

Children's Park may refer to:

- Children's Park (film), a 2019 Indian Malayalam film
- Children's Park, Kollam, Kerala, India
- Children's Park (San Diego), California, United States
- Donnie Chin International Children's Park, Seattle, Washington, United States
- E. L. Senanayake Children's Park, Kandy, Central Province, Sri Lanka
- Efua Sutherland Children's Park, Greater Accra Region, Ghana
- Ion Creangă Children's Park, Timisoara, Romania
- Vitya Cherevichkin Children's Park, Rostov-on-Don, Russia

== See also ==
- Playground
