= Sri Lanka's Got Talent =

Televised Sri Lankan talent show competition

- Genre: Reality; Talent show
- Created by: Simon Cowell
- Based on: America's Got Talent
- Creative director: Ravinath Menon
- Presented by: Current: Ranga Jayakodi and Chamal Ratnayake (S2–present); Former: Dasun Madushan and Piyath Rajapakse (S1)
- Judges: Current: Sangeetha Weeraratne; Danu Innasithamby; Akhila Dhanuddhara; Stephanie Siriwardhana; Former: Jackson Anthony (S1); Soundarie David Rodrigo (S1); Tillakaratne Dilshan (S1); Natasha Rathnayake (S2)
- Country of origin: Sri Lanka
- Original language: Sinhala
- No. of seasons: 3
- No. of episodes: 28 (S1); 26 (S2)

Production
- Executive producer: Ravinath Menon
- Production companies: Stein Studios; Syco Entertainment

Original release
- Network: Sirasa TV
- Release: 18 March 2018 – present

Related
- Sri Lanka's Got Talent season 1

Sri Lanka's Got Talent (often abbreviated as SLGT) is a televised Sri Lankan talent show competition and is part of the global Got Talent franchise created by Simon Cowell. The program is produced by Stein Studios and Syco Entertainment, and broadcasts on Sirasa TV.

The first season premiered on 18 March 2018, with the live finale being held on 30 September 2018. After a 7-year hiatus the show was renewed for a second season in 2024.

== Format ==
Contestants of any age, who possess some sort of talent, can audition for the show, with their performance judged by a panel of judges in the preliminary rounds. During the auditions three acts will receive the Golden buzzer, one from each judge. 50 acts from the auditions, along with 3 golden buzzer acts and 3 wild card acts chosen by the judges will advance to the quarterfinals. Some acts might require performing again in order to be confidently chosen for the quarterfinals, similar to the Judge Cuts.

56 acts will compete in 8 quarterfinals, 7 acts per quarterfinal. 3 acts from each quarterfinal will advance to the semifinals. The advanced 24 acts will compete in 4 semifinals, 6 acts per semifinal. Each semifinal will feature a guest judge as well. In each semifinal, one act will be selected by the judge board to advance to the Pre Finale directly and 2 more acts will be selected based on public votes.

12 acts will compete in a double-episode Pre Finale, 6 acts per each episode. At the end of the second episode, Top 6 acts from the Pre Finale will be chosen by the judge board to compete in the live Grand Finale.

In the live telecasted Grand Finale, a winner and runners-up will be chosen based on public votes. The winner will be awarded with the "SLGT Champions" title along with a Rs. 10 million cah prize.

== Judges and Hosts ==
Season	Hosts	Judges
1	Dasun Madushan; Piyath Rajapakse	Jackson Anthony; Soundarie David Rodrigo; Tillakaratne Dilshan
2	Ranga Jayakodi; Chamal Ratnayake	Danu Innasithamby; Sangeetha Weeraratne; Natasha Rathnayake; Akhila Dhanuddhara
3	Ranga Jayakodi; Chamal Ratnayake	Danu Innasithamby; Sangeetha Weeraratne; Stephanie Siriwardhana; Akhila Dhanuddhara

=== Guest judges ===
Guest judges appeared in season 1 semifinals to help the judge board to decide on 4 acts which will advance to the Pre Finale directly without going through the public votes.

Season	Guest judges in the semifinals			
1	Lahiru Perera	Dilhani Ekanayake	Bathiya Jayakody	Pubudu Chathuranga

== Series overview ==
Season	Originally aired		Winner	Runner-up	3rd place
Season	First aired	Last aired	Winner	Runner-up	3rd place
1	18 March 2018	30 September 2018	Angampora Pool	Nimna Hiranya	Nipuni Sithara
2	06 July 2024	13 October 2024	Ravindra Kumara	Maathra Dance Studio	Nipuna with Step Up
3	29 November 2025	14 March 2025	Katuwana Sando	Not awarded	

=== Season 1 (2018) ===
The preliminary rounds took place at 3 locations in 2017, 30 October - 1 November at E. L. Senanayake premises, Kandy, 11 - 12 November at Mahinda College, Galle and 24 - 26 November at Stein Studios, Colombo. The rest of the season was also held at Stein Studios. The season premiered on 18 March 2018 at 9 p.m in Sirasa TV. Jackson Anthony's golden buzzer act was the Gini Sisila (fire dance) act by Nipuni Sithara, Tillakaratne Dilshan's was the traditional Angampora dance act by the Sri Lanka Air Force and Soundarie David Rodrigo's was the musician N.S. Wageshan.

Quarterfinals were held from 17 June 2018. Lahiru Perera, Dilhani Ekanayake, Bathiya Jayakody from the music duo Bathiya and Santhush and Pubudu Chathuranga were the 4 guest judges in the semifinals respectively. Jackson Anthony's golden buzzer Nipuni Sithara, Tillakaratne Dilshan's golden buzzer Angampora pool, circus acrobat M.G. Suminda and rubic cube solver Osindu Nayanajith were the 4 acts directly advanced to the Pre Finale from the semifinals round.

The Pre Finale was held on 9 and 16 September 2018. The Grand Finale was held on 30 September 2018. The season was won by the Angampora Pool of the Sri Lanka Air Force, with the fast mental arithmetic act Nimna Hiranya coming in second and the fire dance act Nipuni Sithara placing third.

=== Season 2 (2024) ===
After a 7-year hiatus since 2018 due to domestic situations and the COVID-19 pandemic, the show was renewed for a second season in May 2024. The season premiered on 6 July 2024 at 8:30 p.m. on Sirasa TV, with the preliminary auditions conducted across all nine provinces, including locations such as Anuradhapura, Jaffna, Kandy, and Matara. The main competition rounds were held at Stein Studios in Ratmalana.

The judging panel for the second season featured a new lineup consisting of singer Natasha Rathnayake, social media personality Danu Innasithamby, actor Akhila Dhanuddhara, and actress Sangeetha Weeraratne. The season also introduced a change in presenters, with popular YouTube personalities Ranga Jayakodi and Chamal Ratnayake (from the duo Janai Priyai) taking over hosting duties.

The Grand Finale took place on 13 October 2024. Six finalists competed for the title: Maathra Dance Studio, Nipuna With Step Up, Diamond Kick Taekwondo Team, CJ's Crew, Amritha School of Dance, and Ravindra Kumara. The season was won by Ravindra Kumara, whose performance captivated the national audience. Maathra Dance Studio finished as the runner-up, while Nipuna With Step Up secured third place. Following the success of the season, the show was quickly renewed for a third season, which began airing in late 2025.

=== Season 3 (2025–26) ===
Following the success of the 2024 revival, the third season premiered on 29 November 2025 on Sirasa TV. The audition tour was highly inclusive, covering all nine provinces with stops in Anuradhapura, Jaffna, Kurunegala, Badulla, Kandy, Batticaloa, Ratnapura, and Matara, in addition to the primary filming location at Stein Studios in Ratmalana. This season featured a diverse range of 100 selected acts, including traditional "sando" artists and modern stunt performers.

The judging panel saw the return of Sangeetha Weeraratne, Danu Innasithamby, and Akhila Dhanuddhara, joined by new judge Stephanie Siriwardhana. The hosts also the return of Ranga Jayakodi and Chamal Ratnayake.
