= MasterChef Sri Lanka =

Sri Lankan cooking reality series

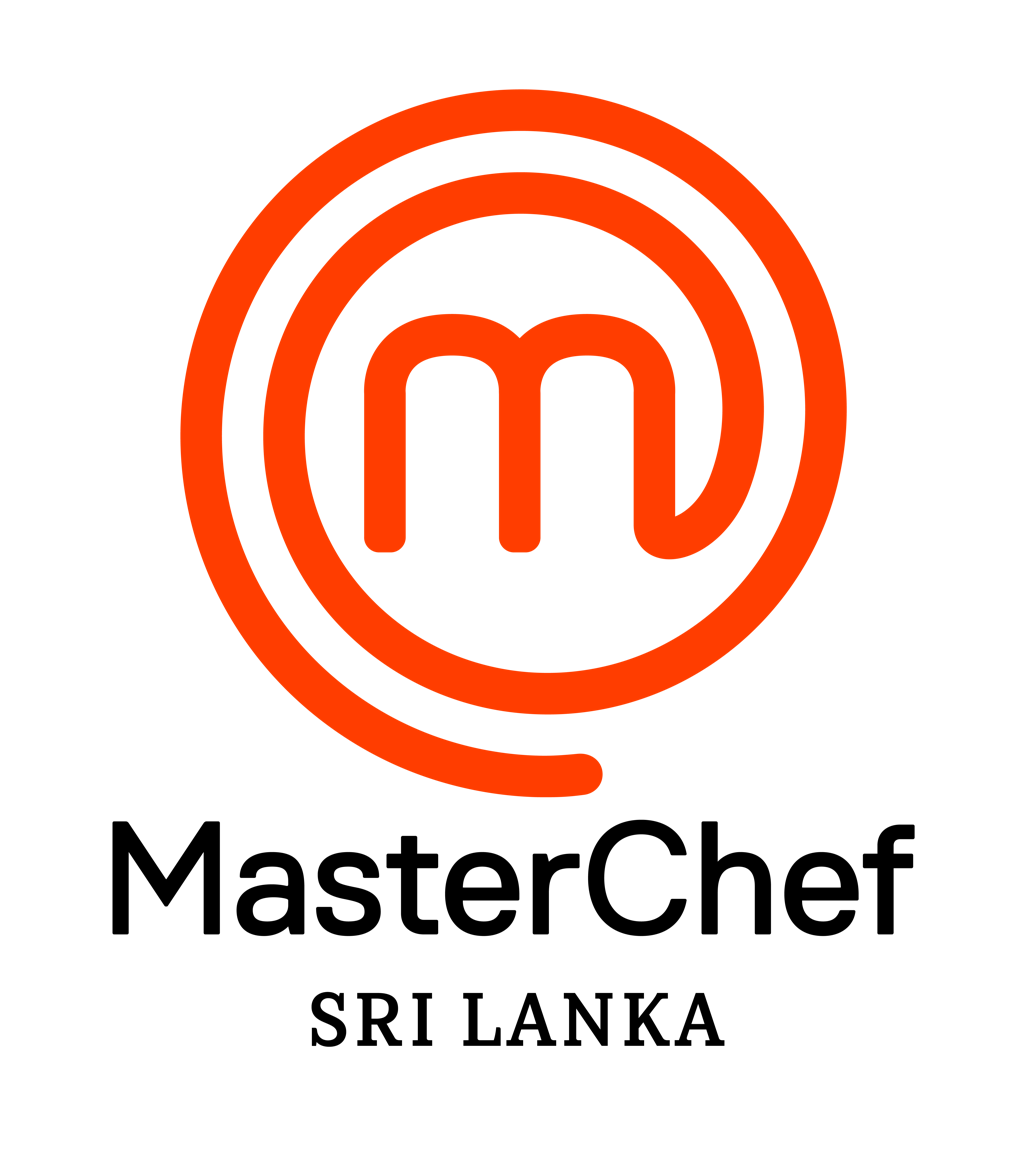
- ශ්‍රී ලාංකේය මාස්ටර්චෙෆ් மாஸ்டர்செஃப் இலங்கை
- Genre: Reality TV, Cooking show
- Created by: Franc Roddam
- Showrunner: Risinu Gamlath
- Directed by: Risinu Gamlath
- Presented by: Danu Innasithamby
- Judges: Peter Kuruvita; Savindri Perera; Rohan Fernandopulle; Kapila Jayasinghe
- Opening theme: "MasterChef Sri Lanka opening theme" to the sound of "Burning up in my heart", with a carousel presenting the contestants
- Country of origin: Sri Lanka
- Original language: Sinhala / English / Tamil
- No. of seasons: 2
- No. of episodes: 25 (S1), 25 (S2)

Production
- Producer: Ajith Gamlath
- Production locations: Cinnamon Grand, Colombo (Cinnamon Hotels & Resorts)
- Camera setup: Sony FX6 Multi-camera setup
- Running time: 60 minutes
- Production company: Reality TV Productions Pvt Ltd

Original release
- Network: ITN, Swarnavahini
- Release: 14 February 2026 – present

Related
- MasterChef

MasterChef Sri Lanka is a Sri Lankan reality cooking competition based on the international MasterChef format. Produced by Reality TV Productions, its first season premiered on 14 February 2026 on the Independent Television Network (ITN).

The show is the 71st international version of the MasterChef franchise, which is owned by Banijay Entertainment. The main goal of the series is to celebrate Sri Lankan food and culture using the theme "Sri Lanka on a Plate."

== Format ==
The show follows the same rules as the international MasterChef series. People who love cooking at home compete in different kitchen challenges. These include "Mystery Box" challenges–cooking with a box of surprise ingredients, racing against the clock in hard tests, and working together in teams.

The very first season started with a training camp. This helped the judges pick the top 20 finalists from across the country to compete in the main show.

== Host and judges ==
Season	Judges				Host
1	Peter Kuruvita	Rohan Fernandopulle	Savindri Perera	Kapila Jayasinghe	Danu Innasithamby
2	Peter Kuruvita	Rohan Fernandopulle	Savindri Perera	Kapila Jayasinghe	Danu Innasithamby

== Production ==
The show is filmed at a custom-built, world-class kitchen studio located at the Cinnamon Grand Colombo. The production and the franchise rights is owned by Reality TV Productions. Main sponsors for the series include the CBL Group (Munchee, Sera, and Ritzbury) and Cinnamon Hotels and Resorts.

== Series overview ==
Season	Eps.	Final contestants	Premiere date	Final date	Winner	Runner-up	3rd place	Broadcaster
1	25	20	14 February 2026	9 May 2026	Sanjula Manoj	Maria Silva	Sandeepa Maduranga	Independent Television Network
2	25	17	18 July 2026	10 October 2026	Balasubramaneam Narmatha	Sonaya Rajapaksha	Shabnam Muzammil	Swarnavahini

=== Season 1 (2026) ===
The inaugural season of MasterChef Sri Lanka premiered on 14 February 2026, concluded on 9 May 2026. This local adaptation of the global franchise was produced by Reality TV Productions under the theme "Sri Lanka on a Plate." The show started with its Top 20 contestants.

Sanjula Manoj was crowned the first-ever MasterChef Sri Lanka winner in the grand finale. As the victor, Manoj received a grand prize of LKR 3 million, a BYD Sealion 5, and the inaugural MasterChef Sri Lanka trophy. Maria Silva finished the season as the runner-up.

=== Season 2 (2026) ===
The season 2 of MasterChef Sri Lanka premiered on the same year as its inaugural season, on 18 July 2026. Reality TV Productions continues with production rights for Season 2. The first two episodes consisted of the judges choosing the top 16 contestants who will contest against one another throughout the upcoming season. On 1 August (in S2E5), Manjula "Sajee" Sajeewani won the first immunity pin of the season, which was recorded as the first-ever immunity pin in the entire MasterChef franchise to be made out of solid gold.
