= SLGT =

SLGT may refer to:

- Map code for "slight risk" in Severe weather terminology (United States) § Convective outlook categories
- Sri Lanka's Got Talent
