= Soul Sounds =

Soul Sounds may refer to:

- Soul Sounds (choir), a choir based in Colombo, Sri Lanka
- Soul Sounds (album), a 1967 album by Chris Clark
- "Soul Sound", a 2001 song by Sugababes
