= Soundarie David Rodrigo =

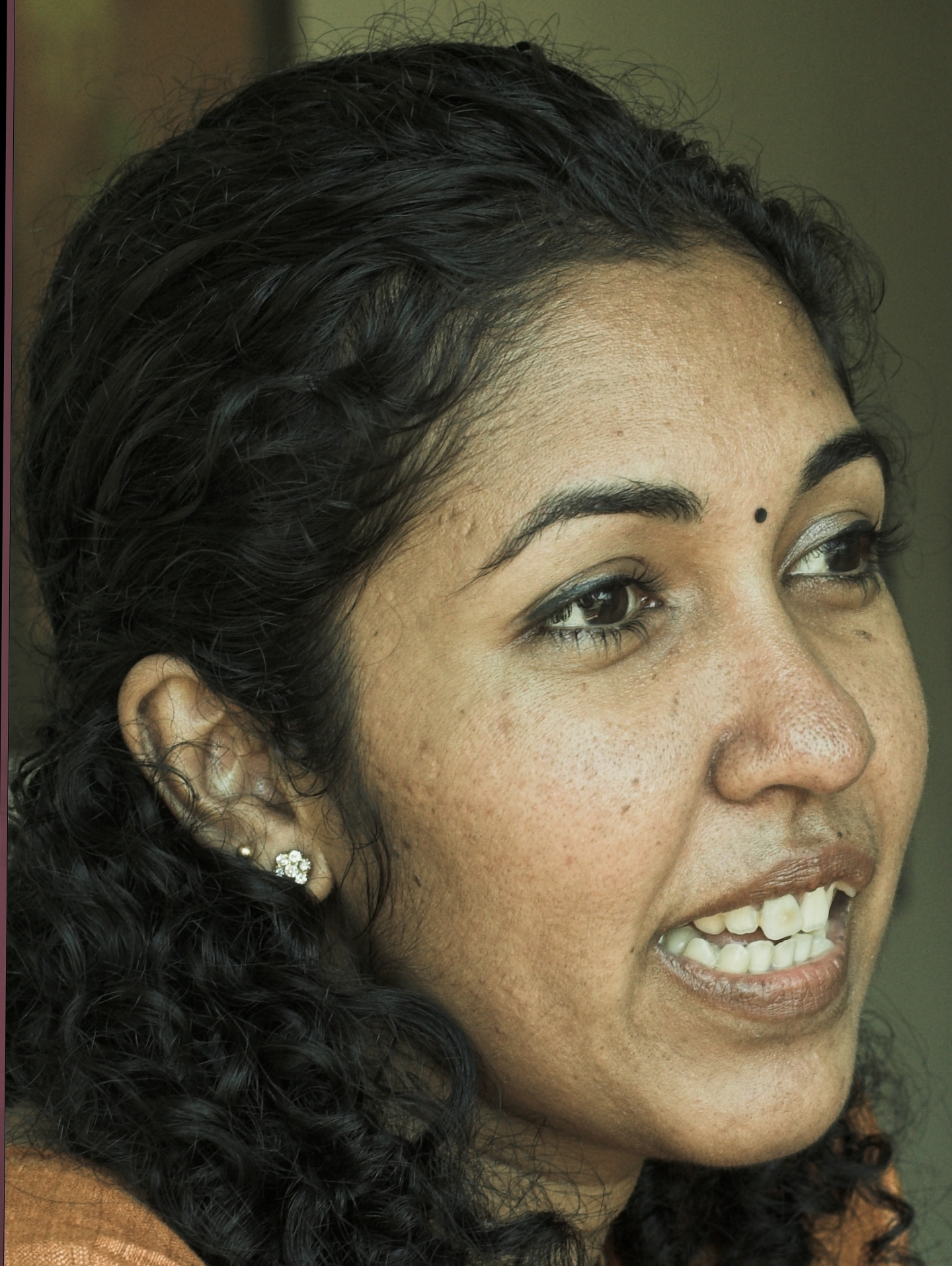

Background information
- Origin: Sri Lanka
- Occupations: Musician, director, educationalist
- Instrument: Piano
- Member of: Soul Sounds, Soul

Soundarie David Rodrigo is a pianist, accompanist, music director and music educationalist from Sri Lanka. She is in the panel of judges of the Sri Lanka's Got Talent (often abbreviated as SLGT) originated from the Got Talent franchise and the world Choir Games She is also the founder and music director of Sri Lanka's premier female ensemble ‘Soul Sounds’– that has performed and won at many international competitions. By being a judge at the 9th World Choir Games, she also became the first Sri Lankan to be a judge at any international musical competition.

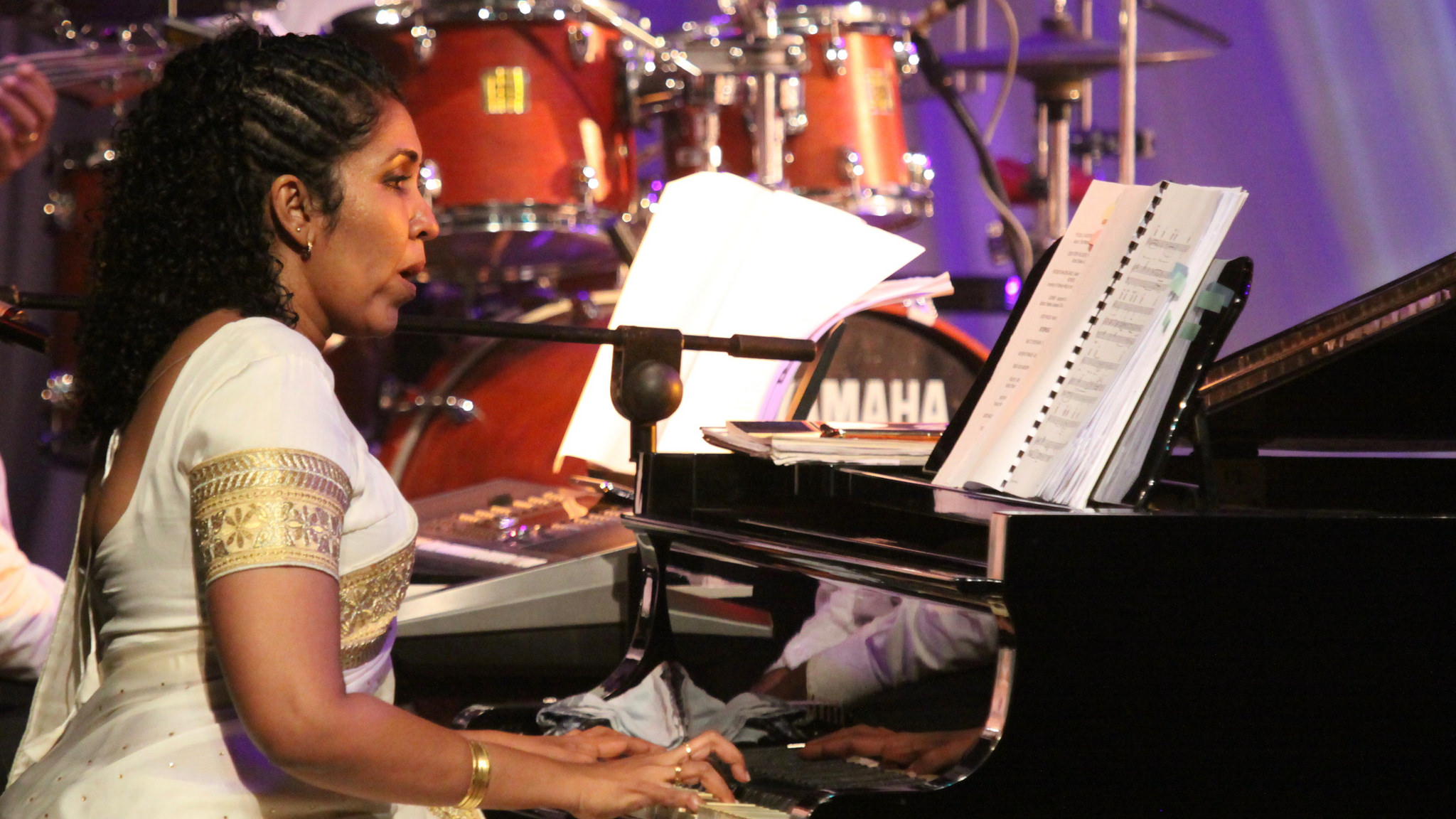

== Early life and education ==
Soundarie David Rodrigo was a student of Holy Family Convent and she began playing the piano at the age of five.. She completed her LLB at the University of Colombo and obtained her Attorney-at-Law at the Sri Lanka Law College. She has a Masters in law, in the field of Intellectual Property and Entertainment Law from the University of California, Berkeley she pursued her musical education at the Royal College of Music in London, where she was conferred with the award, Associate of the Royal College of Music, in piano performance and piano accompaniment ARCM.

== Career ==
She was the deputy director at the SAARC Cultural Centre based in Sri Lanka, and is currently the Director, Programs for the Colombo Cultural Hub. She is the founder of the music Academy, The Soul Sounds Academy, and is also the founder and music director of Soul Sounds.

She was described by The Hindu as "a consummate musician who transformed the Western music scene in Sri Lanka" by starting and directing a female ensemble, Soul Sounds, the first Sri Lankan choir to perform and win at the World Choir Games in the year 2004. Soundarie is also the founder of the band “Soul” which focuses on original fusion music. The band has performed in Sri Lanka and also in Russia.

She also serves as a jury member at international choral competitions and is also the Sri Lanka representative on the council for Musica Mundi, the international organisation that hosts several international choral festivals and competitions. She was featured in the Season 2 of ETV's (A local television channel in Sri Lanka) in their series of Power Women. She is in the panel of judges of the Sri Lanka's Got Talent (often abbreviated as SLGT) originated from the Got Talent franchise alongside Jackson Anthony and Tillakaratne Dilshan

== Performances ==
Soundarie has performed both locally and internationally. Some of her key performances include

- Performances with the Symphony Orchestra of Sri Lanka - Beethovan's piano concerto No 1, Grieg's Piano Concerto in A minor and Gershwin's Rhapsody in Blue.
- Performance with the Bombay Chamber Orchestra in 2009 - Grieg Piano Concerto
- Solo performances in Washington DC for concerts commemorating Martin Luther King in 2013
- Two piano recitals with Ramya De Livera Perera, performing both in Colombo and internationally.
- “Royally Classical” - focused purely on German classical music.
- Beyond Boundaries with Nirupama Rao
- Celebrating Maestro Illayaraja" by Soundarie David Rodrigo & ensemble

== Music Director – Soul Sounds ==
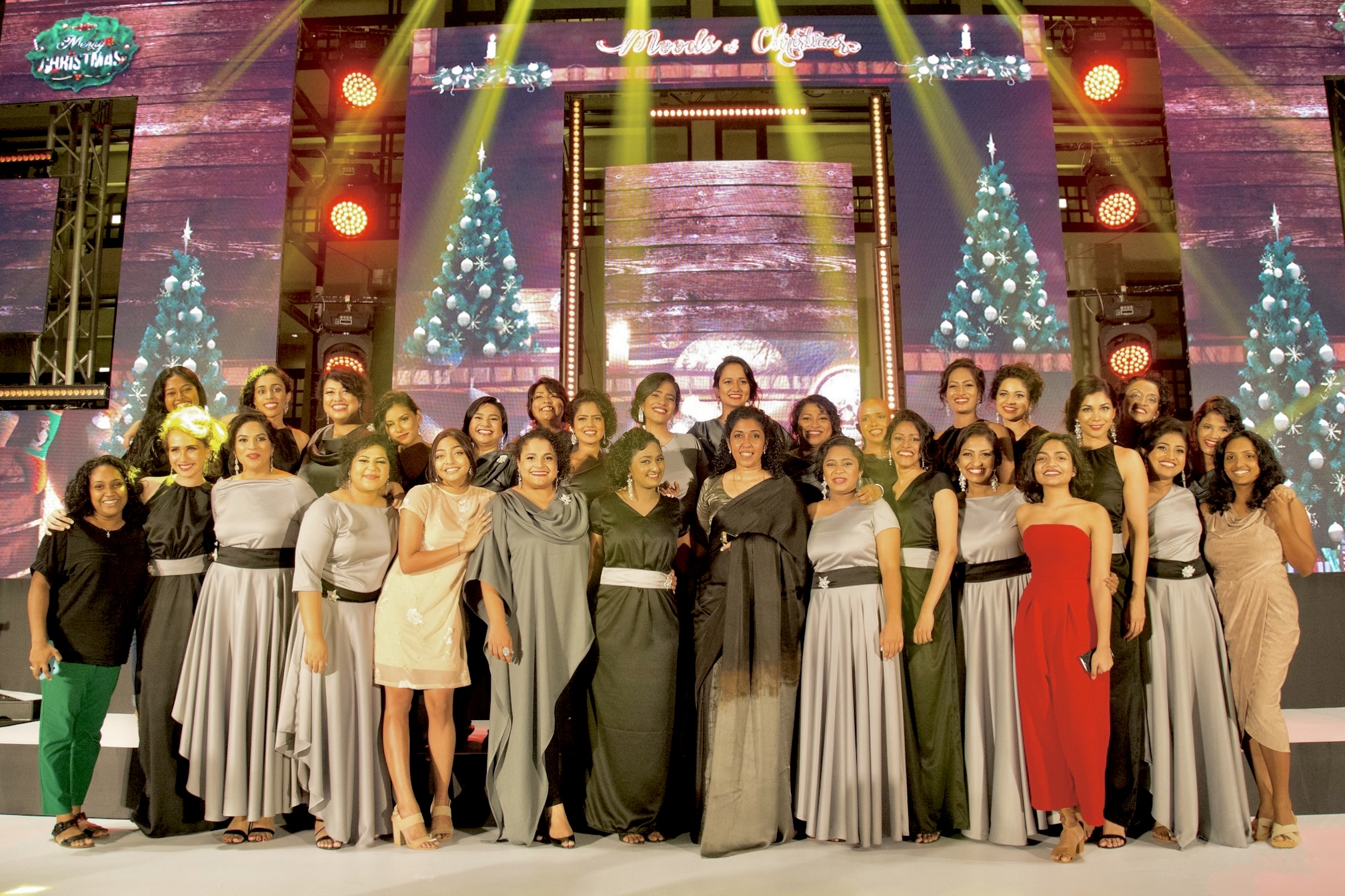
Soundarie at Moods of Christmas 2018 with Soul Sounds

Soul Sounds, founded in 2004, was the first Sri Lankan choir to compete and win at an international choral competition – in 2004 at the Llangollen International Eisteddfod in Wales and in 2006 at the World Choir Games in Xiamen, China. To date, they have performed in Australia, China, India, Kuwait, Austria, France, USA Malaysia and South Africa. The choir won two golds in the open categories of gospel/spiritual and popular choral music, and their third gold medal in the Open Folklore Category at the World Choir Games in Graz, Austria Austria in 2008. Soundarie is responsible for the ensemble's Music Direction, Management and Administrative duties. The Soul Sounds Academy Children's Choir has also won at many international competitions including the silver medal in the Children's category and a bronze medal in the Folk category at the prestigious World Choir Games in Tshwane, South Africa.

== Council Member of Musica Mundi, Interkultur Foundation, Germany ==
Soundarie is a member of the Musica Mundi, one of the largest body in Europe with a mission to comprehensively support international cultural exchange, especially that of lay choirs and music bands. The Foundation is also the organizing body of several leading competitions in Music, including the World Choir Games.

She was also a member of International Jury Panel for the 1st World Choir Championship held in Korea, July 2009/ Vietnam International Choral Competition, Vietnam 2011,World Choir Games, Cincinnati USA 2012. She is the first Sri Lankan to be appointed as member of a high ranking jury panel at one of the leading choir competitions to be held.
