= My Sri Lanka with Peter Kuruvita =

- Genre: Food and cooking
- Created by: Henry Motteram & Peter Kuruvita
- Written by: Scott Tompson
- Presented by: Peter Kuruvita
- Theme music composer: Vicki Hanson
- Composer: Vicki Hanson
- Countries of origin: Australia; Sri Lanka
- Original language: English
- No. of seasons: 1
- No. of episodes: 10

Production
- Executive producer: Henry Motteram
- Production location: Sri Lanka
- Camera setup: The Precinct Studios
- Running time: 60 minutes

Original release
- Network: SBS One
- Release: 3 November 2011 – 5 January 2012

My Sri Lanka with Peter Kuruvita is a 10-part Australian cooking television series created by The Precinct Studios that originally aired on SBS One on 3 November 2011 until 5 January 2012. It is presented by Australian born Sri Lankan chef Peter Kuruvita.

== Description ==
The series was shot on various locations including some most popular tourists destinations like Kandy, Sigiriya and others around Sri Lanka. For each episode he prepares a dish unique to the visited area. The program originally aired on SBS from 2011 November.

== Episodes ==
Episode	Location	Description
1	Colombo	
2	Sigiriya	
3	Kandy	
4	Nuwara Eliya	
5	Hambantota	
6	Weligama	
7	Galle	
8	Trincomalee	
9	Jaffna	
10	Delft	

== Awards ==
- Finalist 2012 Banff Rockies Program Competition Lifestyle & Information Programs.
- Nominee 2012 Logie Award Most Popular New Male Talent.

== See also ==
- Peter Kuruvita
