= Peter Kuruvita =

Australian chef

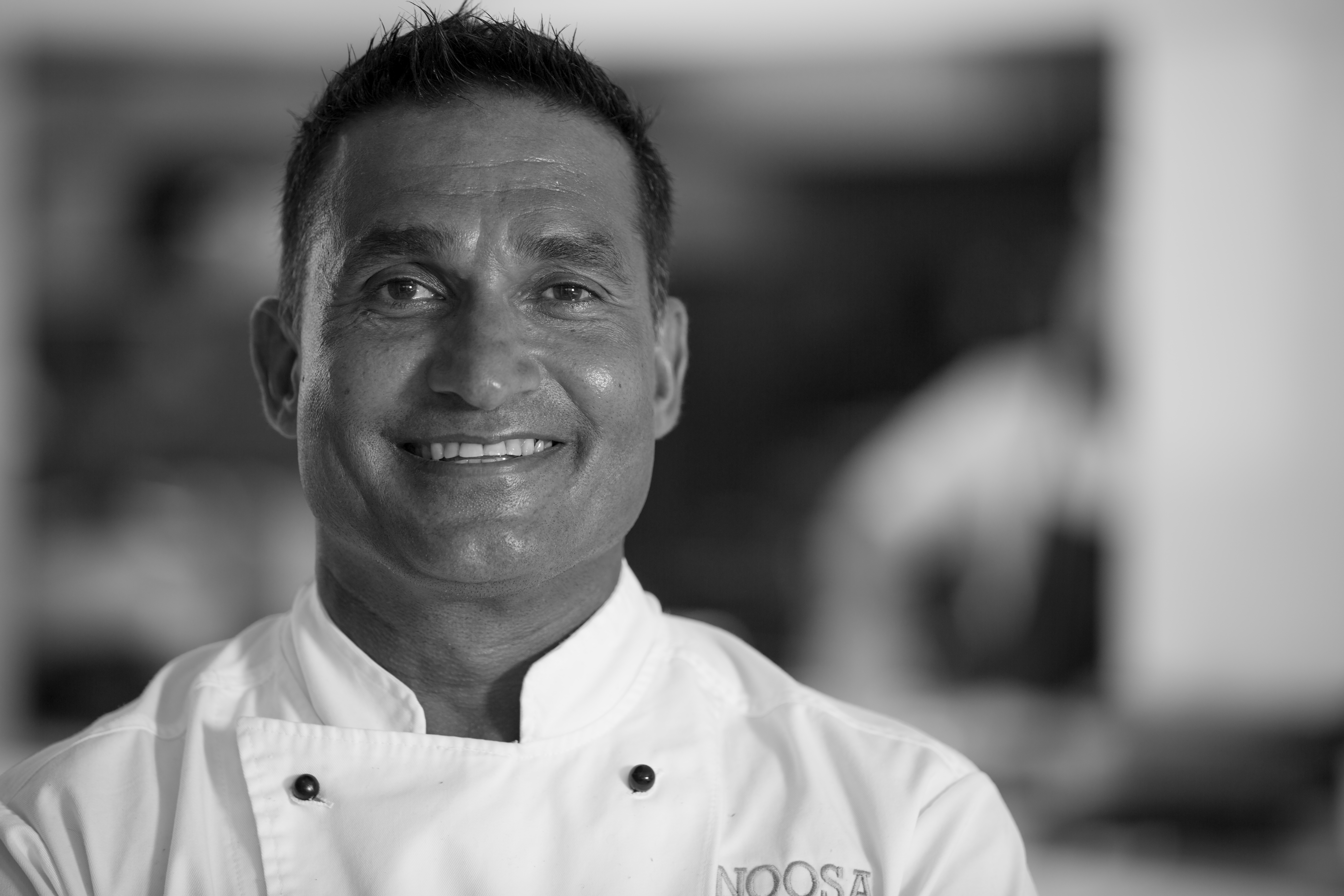
- Born: October 1963 (age 62–63); London, England
- Spouse: Karen Kuruvita
- Children: 3
- Culinary career
- Cooking style: Sri Lankan cuisine, Seafood based Australian cuisine
- Current restaurants
- Flying Fish, Sydney; Flying Fish, Fiji, Fiji; Steak House by Peter Kuruvita, Fiji; Noosa Beach House, Alba by Kuruvita,
- Television shows
- My Sri Lanka with Peter Kuruvita
- Website: Peter Kuruvita

Peter Kuruvita (born October 1963) is an Australian chef, restaurateur and media personality, known for his cooking, which takes influence from his Sri Lankan father and Austrian mother.

== Early life ==
Born in 1963 in Fulham, to a Sri Lankan father and Austrian mother, Kuruvita lived the first four years of his life in England. In 1967 Kuruvita's family decided to move to his father's hometown of Colombo, Sri Lanka. While growing up in Sri Lanka, he was introduced to cooking through his grandmother's preparation of Sri Lankan cuisine. It was this and a strong sense of family that inspired him to pursue food as a career.

In 1974, Kuruvita and his family moved to Sydney, where he went to school. Upon finishing high school he began an apprenticeship as a chef at East Sydney TAFE. He completed his final year at the new Ryde Catering College.

== Career ==
Kuruvita's first job was in the kitchen at a local seafood restaurant in southern Sydney, he remained there until 1981 when he moved to complete his studies and gain experience working with Greg Doyle, at the Rogues restaurant & nightclub, where he worked for the next two years. In 1982, completing his apprenticeship Kuruvita took up a role, at the One Star Michelin restaurant Rue St Jacques in London, as the commis chef. Kuruvita later secured a chef role, at the Three Star Michelin restaurant, Waterside Inn, Bray England

Peter has since worked all over the world at hotels and resorts including the Four Seasons Hotel, Philadelphia USA, Yasawa Island Lodge, Fiji, as well as some of Sydney's top restaurants Barrenjoey House; Bilson's; Hayman Island Resort.

== Restaurants ==
Flying Fish 2003

Peter Kuruvita is Consultant Chef of Flying Fish Restaurant in Pyrmont, New South Wales on Sydney Harbour. The restaurant was opened in 2004. The Flying Fish serves modern Australian dishes with a strong seafood focus.

Flying Fish, Fiji

Peter opened Flying Fish Fiji in partnership with Starwood Hotels in 2008, situated on the sand at the Sheraton Fiji Resort Nadi Fiji

Steak House by Peter Kuruvita

Situated at the Westin Hotel Nadi Fiji.

Noosa Beach House

Peter's latest partnership with Accor hotels, situated in the Sofitel Noosa Resort and Spa.

== Television shows ==
- My Sri Lanka with Peter Kuruvita (2011) – A 10-part series as Peter Kuruvita returns to his ancestral homeland of Sri Lanka. Beginning in Colombo, Kuruvita travels extensively to many different corners across the country experiencing a range of different tastes and colours.
- Island Feast With Peter Kuruvita (2011) – A 10-part series.
- Mexican Fiesta with Peter Kuruvita (2014) – A 10-part series.
- Peter Kuruvita's Coastal Kitchen (2016)
- MasterChef Sri Lanka (2026–present) – He serves as a judge in this show

== Books ==
- Serendip: My Sri Lankan Journey, ISBN 978-1-74196-364-9
