= Alexander Column (Rostov-on-Don) =

Monument in Rostov-on-Don, Russia, dedicated to Alexander II

- Александровская колонна
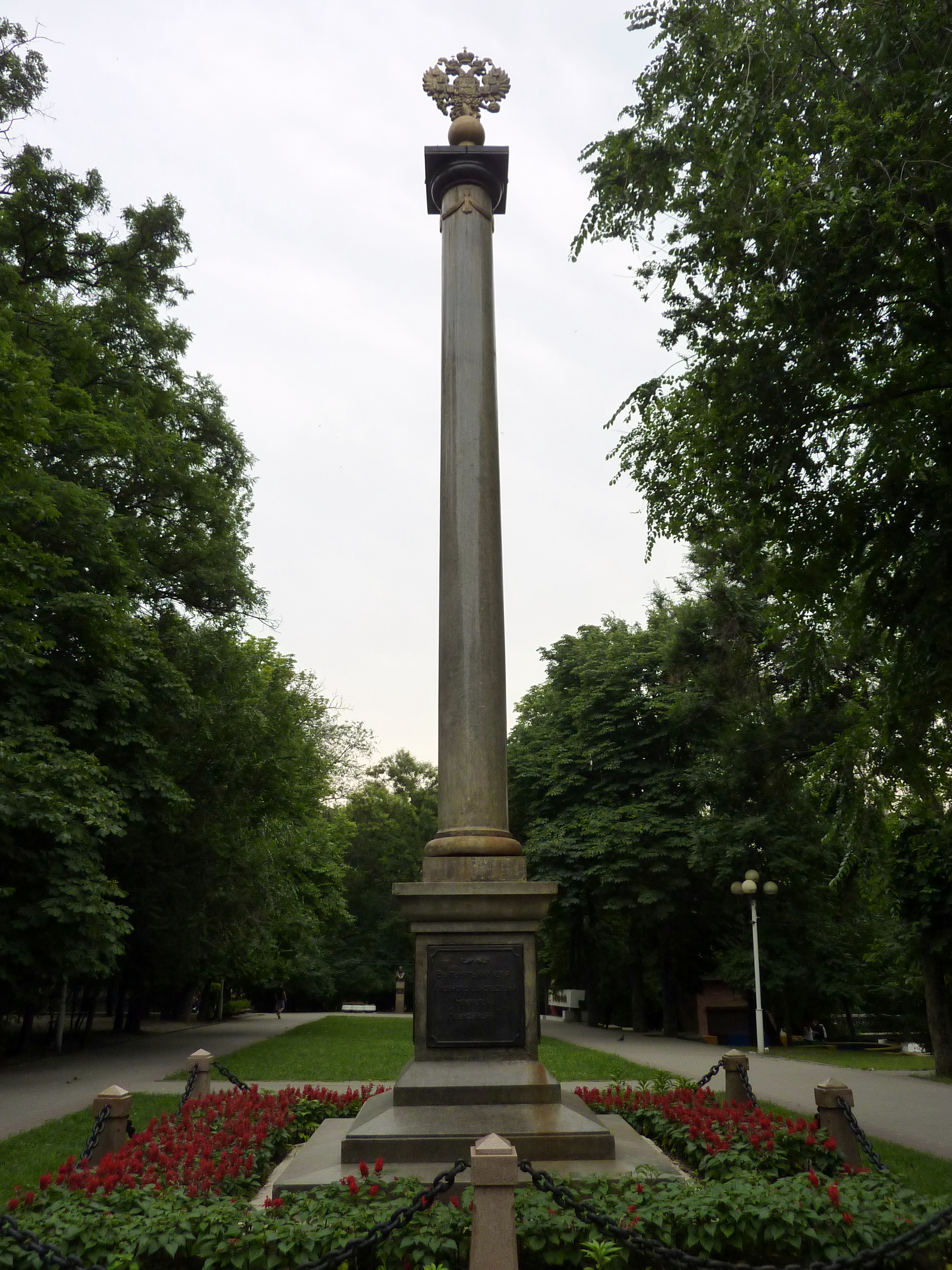
- Interactive map of Alexander Column
- Location: Rostov-on-Don, Rostov Oblast, Russia
- Coordinates: 47.2147°N 39.7153°E
- Type: Column
- Material: Granite
- Height: 11 m
- Opening date: 18 September 1894
- Dedicated to: Alexander II of Russia

The Alexander Column (Александровская колонна) is a monument located in Alexandrovsky Park (now Vitya Cherevichkin Children's Park) in Rostov-on-Don, Russia. It was erected in 1894 in the former city of Nakhichevan-on-Don—now part of Rostov-on-Don—to commemorate the 25th anniversary of Emperor Alexander II's reign.

== History ==
The column was inaugurated on 18 September 1894 to mark the 25th anniversary of Alexander II's accession to the throne. On this occasion, the surrounding park was renamed in his honor as Alexandrovsky Park.

After the Russian Revolution, the column became the only tsarist monument in the city not demolished by the new authorities. However, the double-headed eagle crowning the column and the commemorative plaques were removed. In 1994, during the centennial of its unveiling, the monument was restored to its original appearance.

== Description ==
The monument consists of a single granite monolith surmounted by a bronze double-headed eagle resting on a globe. Two bronze plaques on the pedestal bore inscriptions:

- Въ память XXV лѣтія славнаго царствованія Императора Александра II (“In memory of the 25th anniversary of the glorious reign of Emperor Alexander II”).
- Отъ Нахичеванскаго на Дону армянскаго общества 25·IX·1894 (“From the Armenian community of Nakhichevan-on-Don, 25 September 1894”).

== Gallery ==
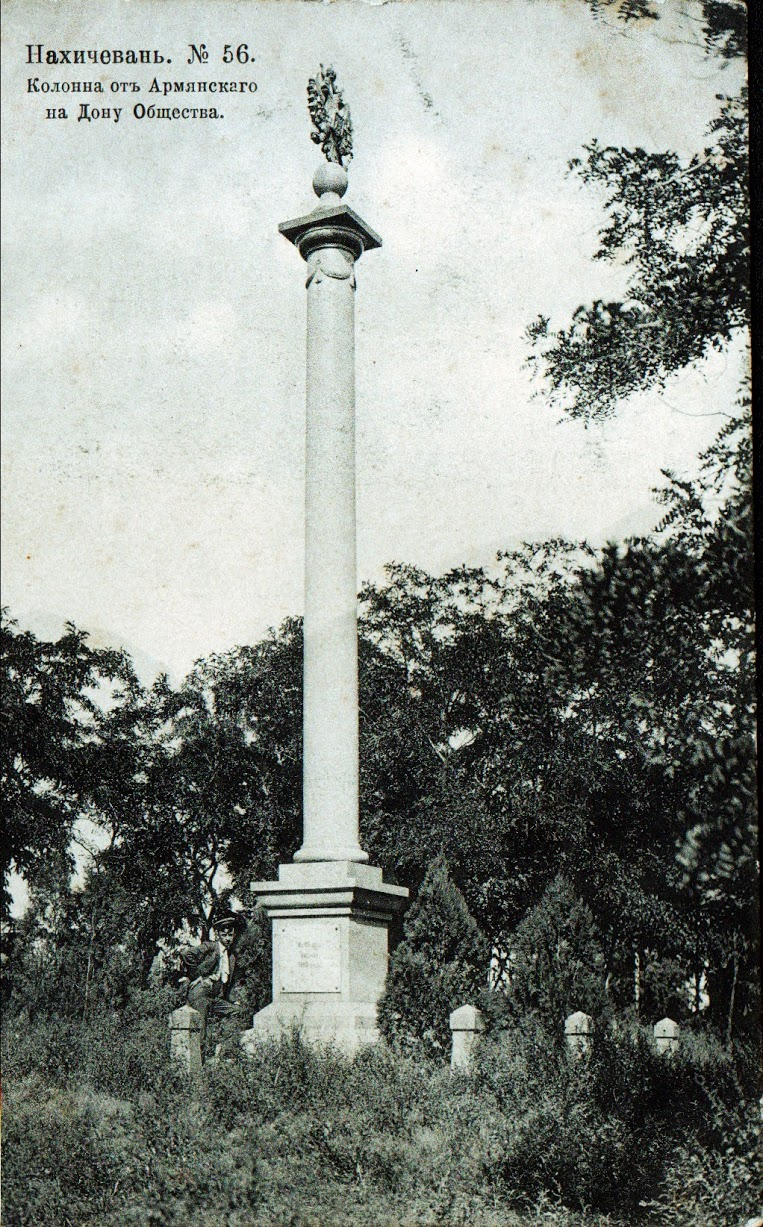
The Alexander Column in 1907

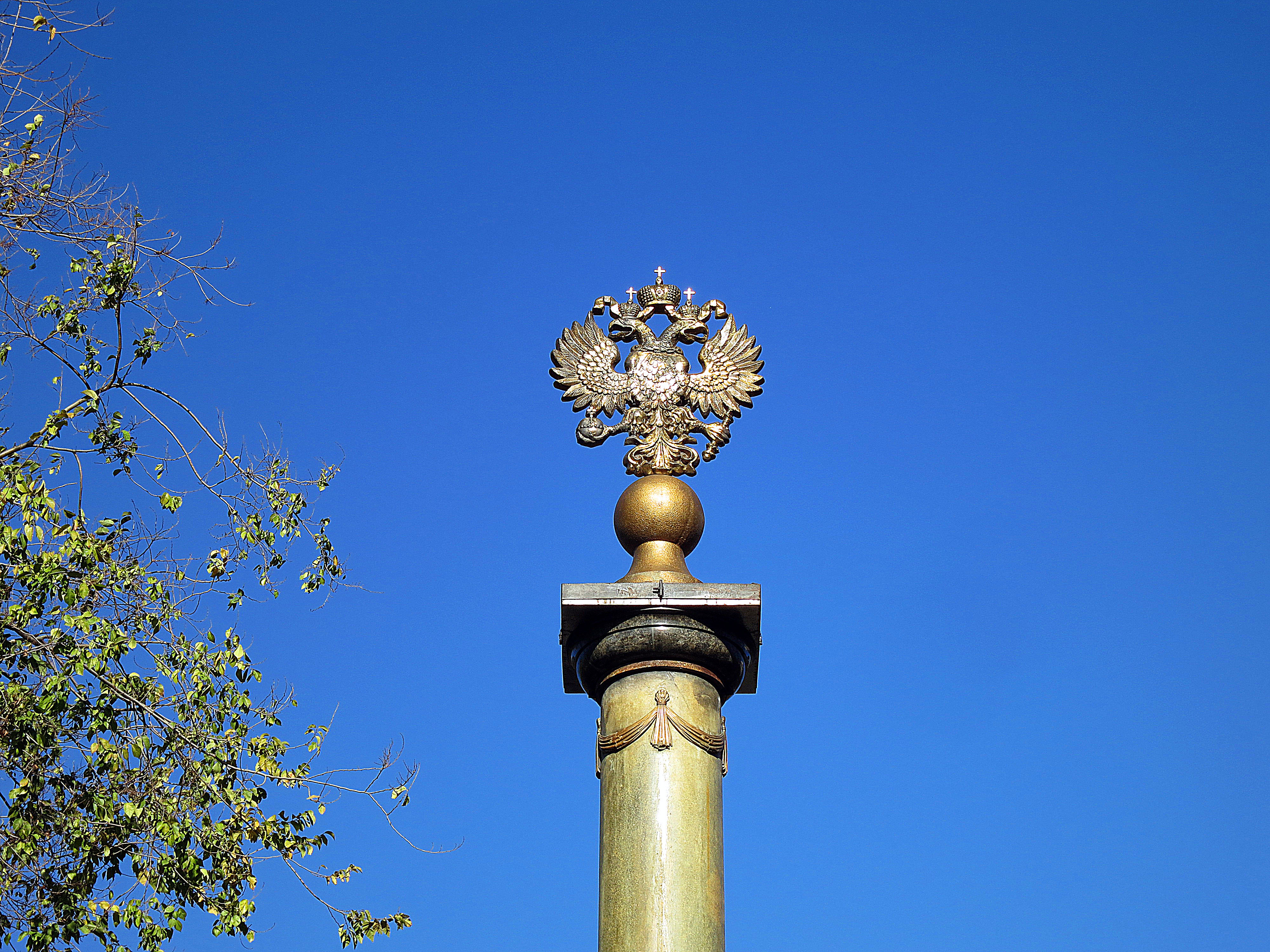
The restored imperial double-headed eagle

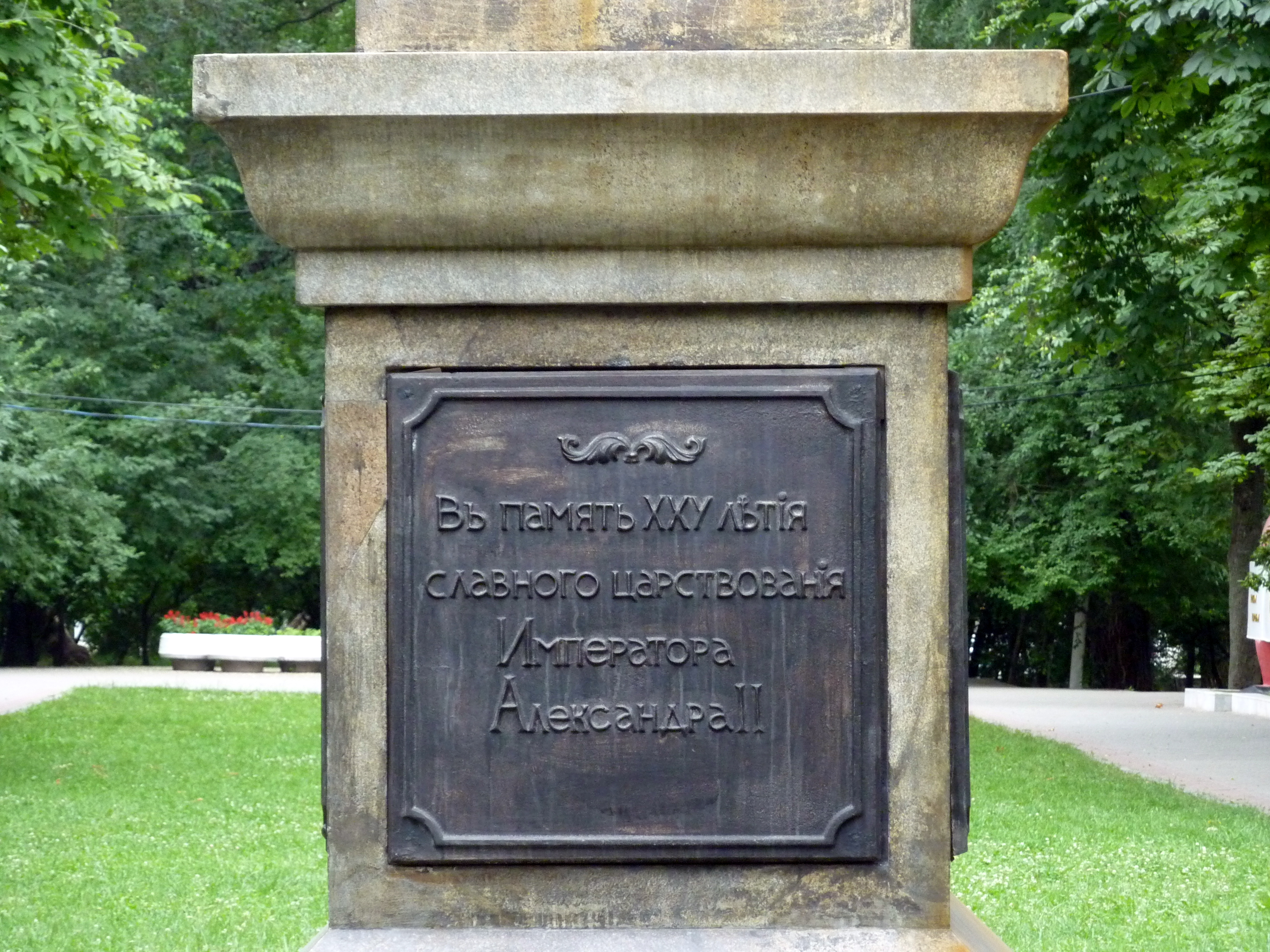
Pedestal decoration

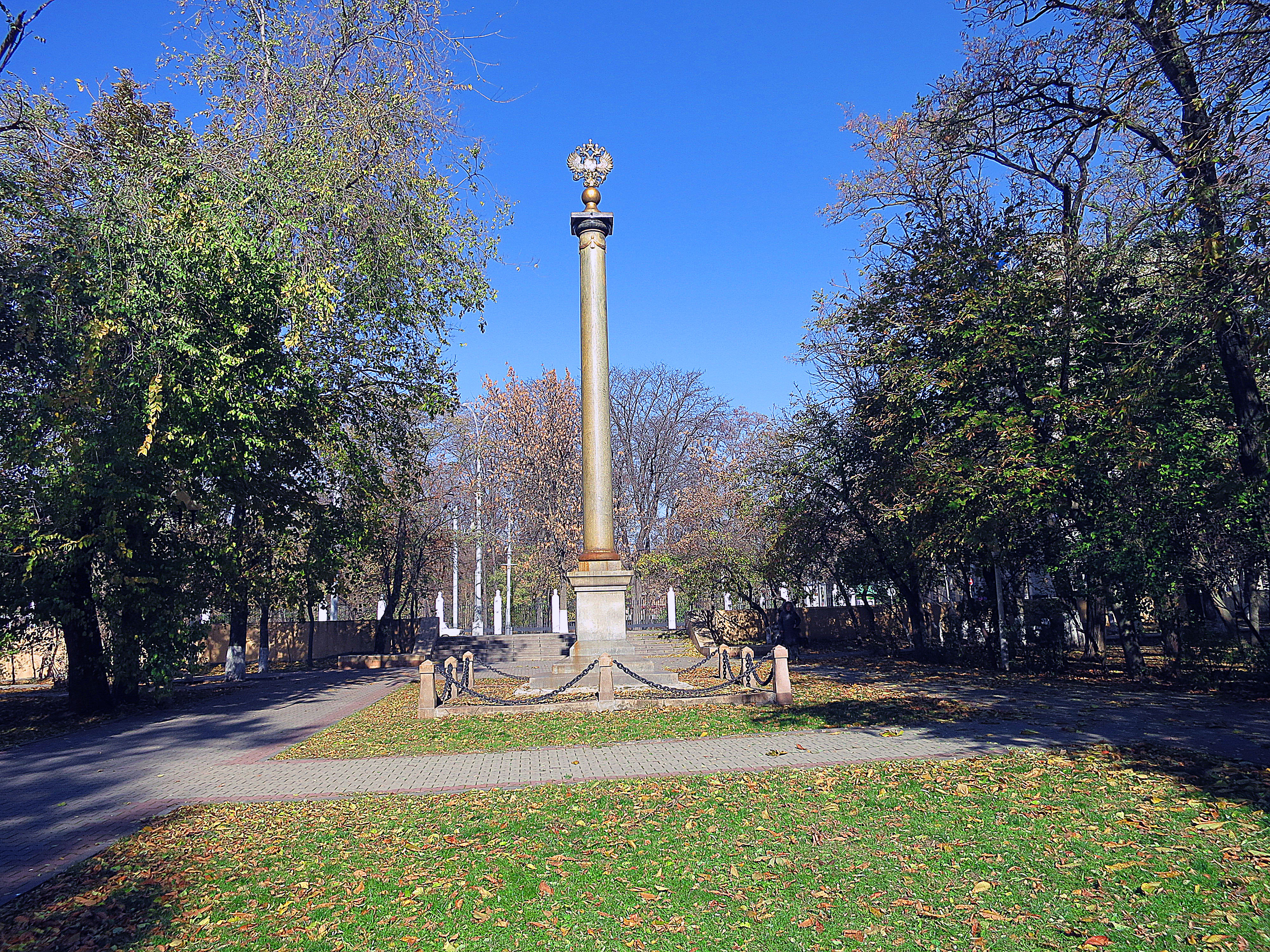
The column in autumn
