= Soul Sounds (choir) =

- Choir
- Origin: Colombo, Sri Lanka
- Founded: December 2004
- Genre: Choral
- Music director: Soundarie David
- Affiliation: No affiliation
- Website: http://www.soulsounds.org

Soul Sounds is a choir based in Colombo, Sri Lanka. The choir first came into prominence as the Holy Family Convent Bambalapitiya school Senior choir, when directed by Soundarie David, it won a Sri Lanka Carol Competition in 1996. After they participated in the Llangollen Eisteddfod competition in Wales 2004, and subsequently leaving the school, the choir decided to continue singing with a new and independent identity, Soul Sounds.

== Competitions ==
Soul Sounds participated in the fourth World Choir Games in Xiamen, China winning two silver medals. In 2008, in competition for the second time, they won three gold medals at the fifth Games in Graz, Austria.

== Recordings ==
The choir was invited to provide a choral contribution to a CD done in the UK by the UK Disasters Emergency Committee after the Asian tsunami of December 26, 2004. Three other compact discs have been released, entitled Soul of the Season (2005), Soul Sounds in Australia (2007) and Soul Sounds in USA (2010).

== International tours ==
Public concerts outside Sri Lanka include 3 concerts in Perth, Sydney and Melbourne suburbs respectively in February 2007, Kuwait City in April 2007, at churches around Normandy, France in April 2009, at the Forbidden City Concert Hall in Beijing, China in June 2009, in New York City and Los Angeles in August/September 2010 and Kuala Lumpur, Malaysia in October 2010. The choir returned to Australia for performances in Sydney and Melbourne in September 2011.
