= Vitya Cherevichkin Children's Park =

Park in Rostov-on-Don, Russia

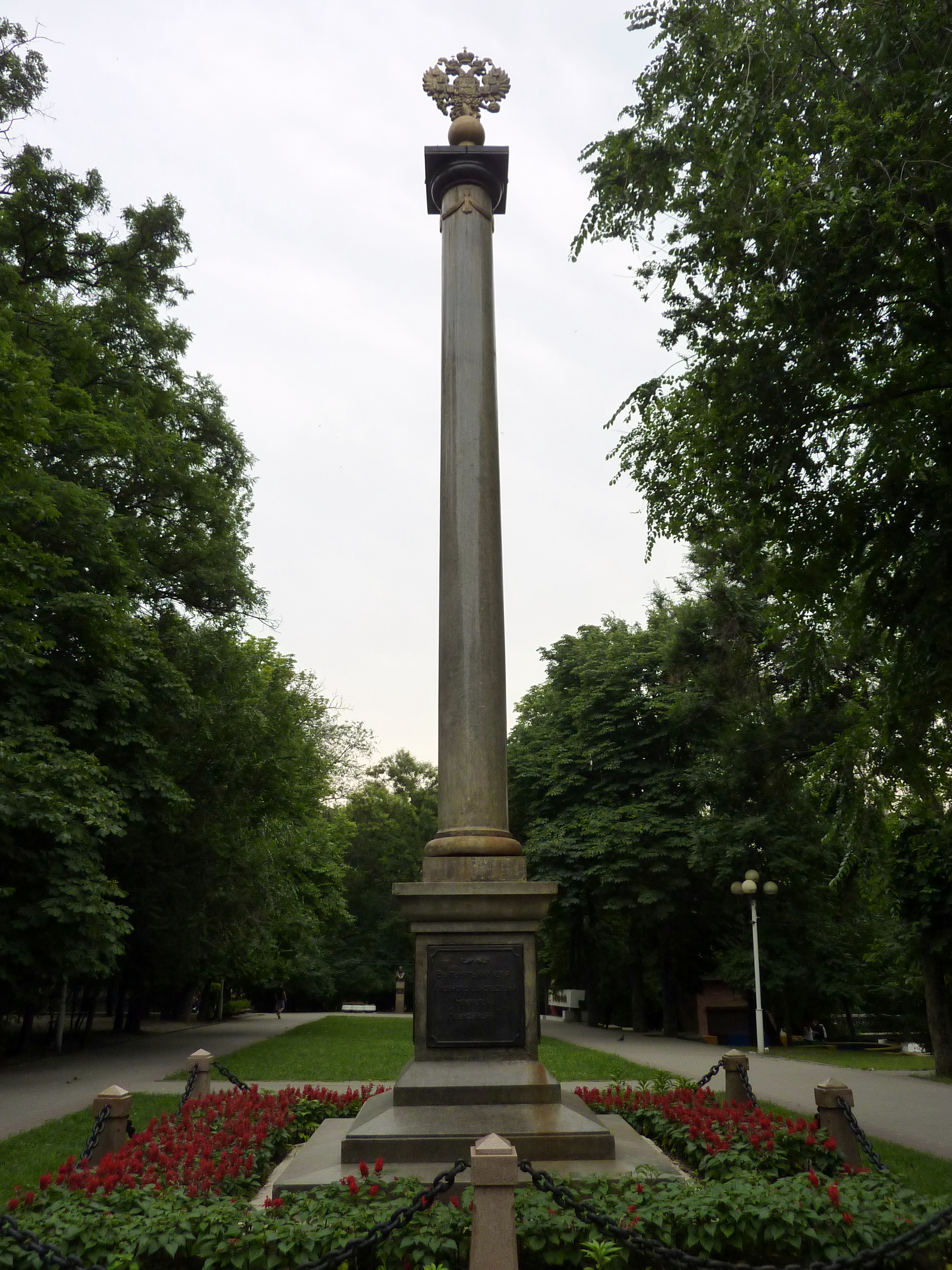
- Interactive map of Vitya Cherevichkin Children's Park
- Type: Children's park
- Location: Rostov-on-Don, Russia
- Coordinates: 47.1337°N 39.4457°E
- Created: 1880

Vitya Cherevichkin Children's Park (Russian: Детский парк имени Вити Черевичкина) is a park in Rostov-on-Don, Russia, established in 1880. It is situated in the city centre near the Don River embankment.

== History and description ==
The park was established in 1880 and initially was called Alexandrovsky Garden in honour of the 25th anniversary of the reign of Emperor Alexander II. In 1894 the Alexander Column, an 11-meter copy of the Alexander Column erected in Saint Petersburg, was installed. The project was undertaken by Rostov architect Nikolai Durbach. In 1998, the column got the status of a cultural heritage site of local significance.

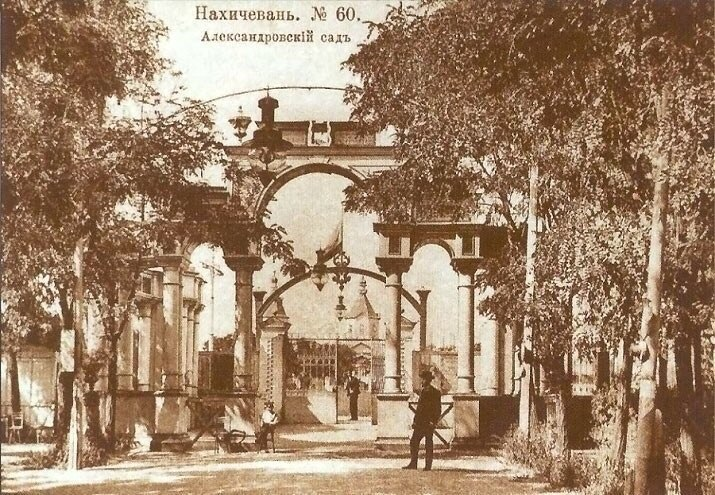
Alexandrovsky Garden in the beginning of XX century

Starting in 1936, the park was called "Children's Park of Pioneers and Schoolchildren." A canal with bridges and a large stage for performances were constructed there. Since 1965, the park has borne the name of Vitya Cherevichkin (1925—1941), a Rostov boy who was murdered by Nazis during World War II. Somewhat earlier, in 1961, a bust of the Rostov sculptor Nikolai Avedikov was installed in the park.

Vitya Cherevichkin Park is currently the only children's park not only in Rostov-on-Don, but also in the whole of Rostov Oblast. It is specially designed for preschool and school-age children. There are a children's playground, a playpen (trampoline), and an aqua park with a children's game complex, "Schooner". There is a tradition of newlyweds hanging locks on the bridge of the park for luck.

In 2000, with the support of the Culture Department of Rostov-on-Don, the park was reconstructed — new children's playgrounds were installed, the park lighting project was implemented and its avenues were paved with tiles.

== Literature ==
- Vitya Cherevichkin Children's Park
- History and legends of Rostov-pn-Don: from Alexandrovsky Garden to Vitya Cherevichkin Children's Park
