= Danu Innasithamby =

Sri Lankan talk show host (born 1985)

- Born: Savio Danushathan Innasithamby; 13 October 1985 (age 41); Manipay Hospital, Jaffna, Sri Lanka
- Occupations: Journalist, actor, media personality
- Years active: 2002–present
- Employer(s): HI!! TV & Daily Mirror
- Website: www.danu.lk

Savio Danushathan Innasithamby (born 13 October 1986), better known as Danu Innasithamby, is a Sri Lankan media personality, talk show host and Actor. Innasithamby is best known for his talk show programmes on Hi TV, Date with Danu and Danu on Fire for HI!! Online, as well as Danuta Kiyanna for Lankadeepa, where he conducts interviews with celebrities from or relevant to Sri Lanka.

Innasithamby is also known for his earlier work on numerous shows for MTV, and his more recent work as the morning show host on Lite FM which was ranked No. 1. He was also hosting the morning show for RED FM.

== Personal life ==
Danu Innasithamby was born on 13 October 1986 at Green Memorial Hospital in Manipay, Jaffna, located in the Tamil-majority north of Sri Lanka. His family is Tamil and followed Catholicism, which he practices to this day. He hails from a long line of doctors, including his father. He also has one sister, Thushara Innasithamby.

Innasithamby grew up in Jaffna until the age of 7 when, shortly after the sudden death of his father, (late Dr. Suganthan Innasithamby) the escalation of the Sri Lankan Civil War forced him, his mother (late Jovith Innasithamby), and sister,( Thushara Innasithamby) to relocate to the capital city of Colombo. It took his family five days to make the trek from Jaffna to Colombo, hitchhiking and travelling on foot through jungle areas.

Innasithamby advocates for human rights in Sri Lanka.

Danu launched his foundation DIF (Danu Innasithamby Foundation) where he works on youth related issues and contributes towards their future development.

Danu Innasithamby joined forces with World Vision Lanka to support the mental well-being of children and youth in the North through the "Every Mind Matters" initiative.

== Career ==
=== Entertainment ===
Innasithamby joined the media and entertainment industry at the age of 16. He started off as a radio DJ at ABC Network, and moved on to E FM awhile later, where he stayed until he was 20-year-old, before moving to Channel One MTV.

From 2006 to 2013, Innasithamby was a part of the Capital Maharaja Organization and was involved in several projects as a part of management. He was the producer and host of shows such as Good Morning Sri Lanka, Planet Pulse, Shakthi Chat, Speak Easy with Danu, Cafe Colombo, and The Agency Show. He also hosted The Phat 30 & Big Breakfast on Yes FM during that time. He then went on to be a part of conceptualizing and planning marketing campaigns for Channel One MTV. In 2010, he was made the acting manager of programming for Channel One MTV.

In 2016, Innasithamby became a part of TNL Radio Network, becoming the manager of Lite87. Innasithamby also provided creative direction to the radio channel. He was the host of LiteCafe during this period. In the same year, Innasithamby was promoted to director of programming at Lite87. In 2018, Danu left his positions at TNL Radio Networks and Lite87 and joined REDFM to host their programme The Morning Show.

Throughout his later career, Danu has been featured in Life Online magazine as a regular columnist. He does multiple segments and articles per week, often with his own creations such as "Buzz with Danu", "WTF by Danu", and "Fashionably, Danu." He currently works with HiTV on their weekly show Date with Danu, as well as Danu on Fire where he interviews popular Sri Lankan celebrities. He also hosts Lankadeepa's Danuta Kiyanna show.

=== Other ===
Innasithamby runs a made-to-order, home-cooked food outlet called 'My Sister's Kitchen' with his sister, Thushara Innasithamby.

In 2018, Danu was appointed as a Peace Ambassador of the World Peace & Diplomacy Organisation (WPDO).
