= Hi!! =

Sri Lankan lifestyle magazine

- Editor In Chief: Shyamalee Tudawe
- Categories: Lifestyle Magazine
- Frequency: Quarterly, Online
- Format: Digital Magazine; Print
- First issue: March 2003; 22 years ago
- Company: Wijeya Newspapers
- Country: Sri Lanka
- Based in: Colombo
- Language: English
- Website: www.hi.lk

Hi!! is an English Language Sri Lankan society and lifestyle magazine, first published in March 2003, under the Wijeya Newspapers group. It covers a variety of areas, from lifestyle, parties, events, fashion, hotels, restaurants, and tourist attractions. Its founding editor since 2003 is Shyamalee Tudawe.

The 100th issue was launched in August 2021.
