= Tillakaratne Dilshan =

Sri Lankan cricketer (born 1976)

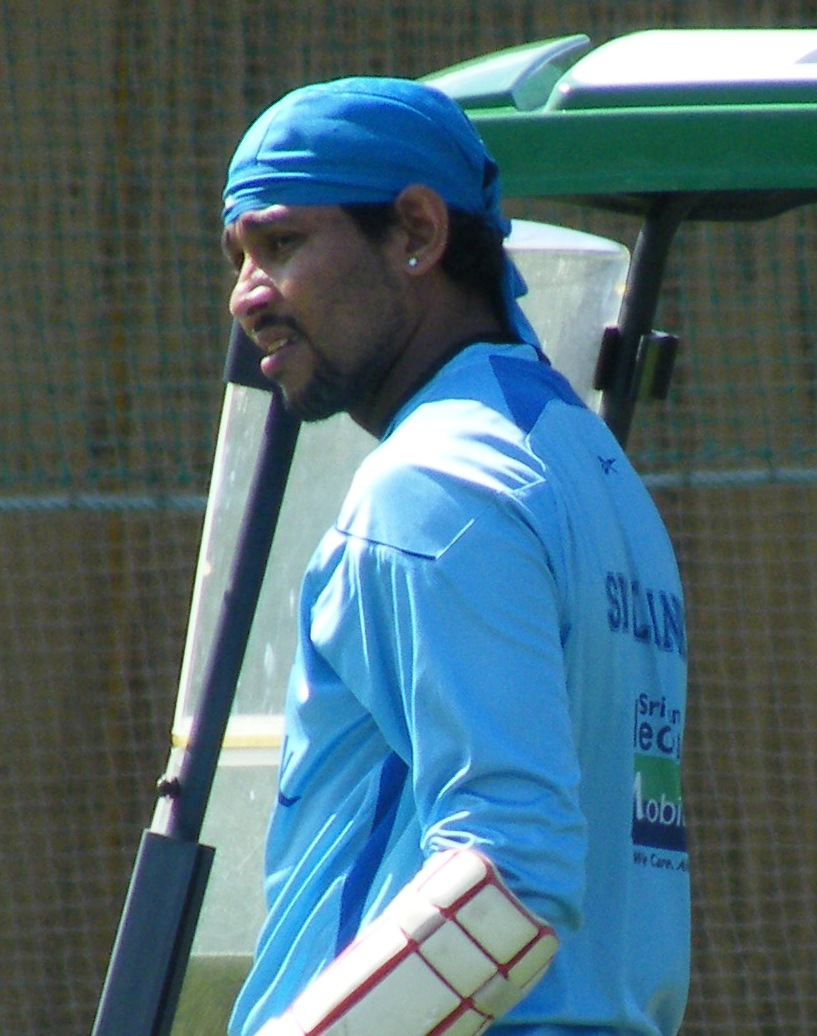

Personal information
- Full name: Tillakaratne Mudiyanselage Dilshan
- Born: 14 October 1976 (age 50); Kalutara, Sri Lanka
- Nickname: TM, Dilee, Mr. Pallekele
- Batting: Right-handed
- Bowling: Right-arm off spin
- Role: All Rounder and Wicketkeeper
- Relatives: Tillakaratne Sampath (brother)

International information
- National side: Sri Lanka (1999–2016)
- Test debut (cap 79): 18 November 1999 v Zimbabwe
- Last Test: 16 March 2013 v Bangladesh
- ODI debut (cap 102): 11 December 1999 v Zimbabwe
- Last ODI: 28 August 2016 v Australia
- ODI shirt no.: 23
- T20I debut (cap 2): 15 June 2006 v England
- Last T20I: 9 September 2016 v Australia
- T20I shirt no.: 23

Domestic team information
- Years: Team
- 1996–1998: Kalutara Town Club
- 1997–1998: Singha Sports Club
- 1998–2000: Sebastianites C&AC
- 2000: Bloomfield C&AC
- 2007–2016: Basnahira South
- 2008–2010: Delhi Daredevils
- 2010: Northern Districts
- 2011–2013: Royal Challengers Bangalore
- 2012: Basnahira Cricket Dundee
- 2013: Dhaka Gladiators
- 2013–2014: Tamil Union C&AC
- 2014: Sydney Thunder
- 2014: Surrey
- 2015: Derbyshire
- 2015: Guyana Amazon Warriors
- 2015: Chittagong Vikings
- 2017: Peshawar Zalmi

Career statistics
Competition	Test	ODI	T20I	FC
Matches	87	330	80	233
Runs scored	5,492	10,290	1,889	13,979
Batting average	40.98	39.27	28.19	38.8
100s/50s	16/23	22/47	1/13	38/59
Top score	193	161*	104*	200*
Balls bowled	3,385	5,880	258	6,501
Wickets	39	106	9	90
Bowling average	43.87	45.07	29.66	36.16
5 wickets in innings	0	0	0	1
10 wickets in match	0	0	0	0
Best bowling	4/10	4/4	3/16	5/49
Catches/stumpings	88/–	123/1	31/2	356/23
Medal record
Men's Cricket
Representing Sri Lanka
ICC Cricket World Cup
Runner-up	2007 West-Indies
Runner-up	2011 India–Bangladesh–Sri Lanka
ICC T20 World Cup
Winner	2014 Bangladesh
Runner-up	2009 England
Runner-up	2012 Sri Lanka
- Source: ESPNricinfo, 9 September 2016

Tillakaratne Mudiyanselage Dilshan (Sinhala: තිලකරත්න මුදියන්සේලාගේ ඩිල්ෂාන්; born 14 October 1976), commonly known as TM Dilshan (Sinhala pronunciation: [tilakaratna dilṣān]) is a former Sri Lankan cricketer and former captain of the Sri Lanka national cricket team. He is often regarded as the best rated Sri Lankan player in run-chases in ODI history and one of the most innovative players of all time. He was the top run scorer in the 2011 Cricket World Cup with 500 runs, and scored a century against England in the quarter-final. Dilshan is considered to be a rare example of a cricketer with notable skills in all aspects of the game, who can bat, bowl, field and keep wicket. He is an aggressive right-hand batsman who invented the scoop, which has come to be known as the Dilscoop, a shot that hits the ball over the keeper. Apart from being an opening batsman, he is also a capable off-break bowler. Energetic in the field, he usually fielded at the point region. He was part of the Sri Lankan team that won the 2014 ICC World Twenty20.

Dilshan made his Test and ODI debut during the Sri Lankan cricket team's tour to Zimbabwe in 1999. He is also the second cap for Sri Lanka in Twenty20 Internationals. He is the first cricketer in the history of the game to score hundreds in all formats as a captain.

Dilshan won the Twenty20 International Performance of the Year award at the 2009 ICC Awards for his 96 off 57 ball shots against West Indies in the semi-final of the 2009 ICC World Twenty20 in England. He also won the man of the series trophy for his individual batting performances in the 2009 ICC World Twenty20 tournament. He was also a key member of the team that won the 2014 ICC World Twenty20 and was part of the team that made the finals of 2007 Cricket World Cup, 2011 Cricket World Cup, 2009 ICC World Twenty20 and 2012 ICC World Twenty20.

He is the fourth Sri Lankan, and eleventh player overall to score 10,000 ODI runs. Being the third overall and first Sri Lankan to score 1,500 runs in Twenty20 Internationals, he is also the first player to hit 200 fours in T20Is. Dilshan scored 1000 or more ODI runs in a calendar year four times and never failed to amass fewer than 800 runs in any calendar year between 2009 and 2015.

Dilshan was under-estimated in the cricket world as an ordinary player when he batted at number 6 and 7, unlike his revered teammates Mahela Jayawardene and Kumar Sangakkara. When he gained the opening batting position, Dilshan became one of the finest cricketers in the world and a legend in modern cricketing history. His quick progression can be seen in his stats: after he moved to the opening position, he scored 21 ODI centuries and all his Test and T20I centuries.

In August 2016, Dilshan announced that he would retire from both ODI and T20I cricket at the end of the series against Australia. He retired from ODI cricket on 28 August 2016 and from T20I cricket on 9 September 2016.

== Early life ==
Dilshan was born on 14 October 1976 in Kalutara, to a Malay father and a Sinhalese mother in a family with five siblings. He was educated at Jaffna Sinhala Madya Maha Vidyalaya in Jaffna for primary education, and then at the Kalutara Vidyalaya, where he started his cricket career as a teenager. However, his family did not want him to play cricket, so his only goal was to get ahead in sports. Dilshan converted from Islam to Buddhism at the age of 16, and was known as Tuwan Mohammad Dilshan before his conversion. His childhood coach Ranjan Paranavitana stated that even though Dilshan had a Muslim name, he and his siblings followed their mother's religion during their childhood and officially changed his religion and name after his parents separated.

== Early career ==
Dilshan first played against Zimbabwe on 18 November 1999 at Bulawayo. He scored 9 runs on his debut and was out LBW to a delivery off Henry Olonga. However, Dilshan managed to score his maiden test century at the Harare Sports Club in the second test between Sri Lanka and Zimbabwe. He scored an unbeaten 163 runs in the first innings and was awarded the player of the match award for his role in the Sri Lankan victory. Dilshan achieved his highest test score in England, where he scored 193 runs in the second test at the Lord's cricket ground, against England.

Dilshan's One-Day International debut also came during Sri Lanka's tour of Zimbabwe in 1999, where he scored 31 runs against Zimbabwe. His maiden ODI century came against Netherlands on 4 July 2006, where he smashed an unbeaten 117 runs along with Sanath Jayasuriya's 157 to help Sri Lanka post then highest ODI score of 443 runs, which stood for 10 years until England scored 444 runs.

Dilshan real talent came through in their match against India on 15 December 2009, where Sri Lanka nearly chased a mammoth target of 414 posted by India. The pitch at Rajkot was perfect to bat on, Dilshan started the run chase with Tharanga, instead of Jayasuriya. In a blistering knock he reached fifty off 38 balls and then scored hundred off 73 balls. His 150 runs came off 115 balls with Sri Lanka on the brink of a sensational win. His score of 160 was full of hooks, pulls and many scoops of his variety, leading the way to victory. But after Dilshan fell when bowled by Harbhajan Singh, the match opened for the Indian team. They took all the advantages and Sri Lanka were bowled out for 411 runs, losing by only 3 runs. This was Dilshan's third century in ODIs, the commentators described it as one of the best chases in the World Cricket. His knock was later nominated to be one of the Best ODI Batting Performance of the year by ESPNcricinfo.

He was named in the 'Team of the Tournament' by ESPNcricinfo for the 2009 T20I World Cup. His knock of 96* against West Indies was later nominated to be one of the Best T20I Batting Performance of the year by ESPNcricinfo.

For his performances in 2009, he was named in the World ODI XI by the ICC.

== Later career ==
Dilshan played almost all his international matches as a middle-order all-round batsman during his early years. However, by 2007, he was selected to open the batting with Sanath Jayasuriya in ODI game against India, where he started to showcase himself as an attacking and threatening opening batsman. Since 2007, his strokeplay has included a host of aggressive strokes which has allowed him to dominate the ODI arena on many occasions. Until retirement, he slotted as the permanent opening batsman for Sri Lanka, as well as operating as a handy right-arm off-break bowler in both ODI and T20I matches.

Dilshan is credited for the creation of the Dilscoop, during the Indian Premier League 2009 tournament.

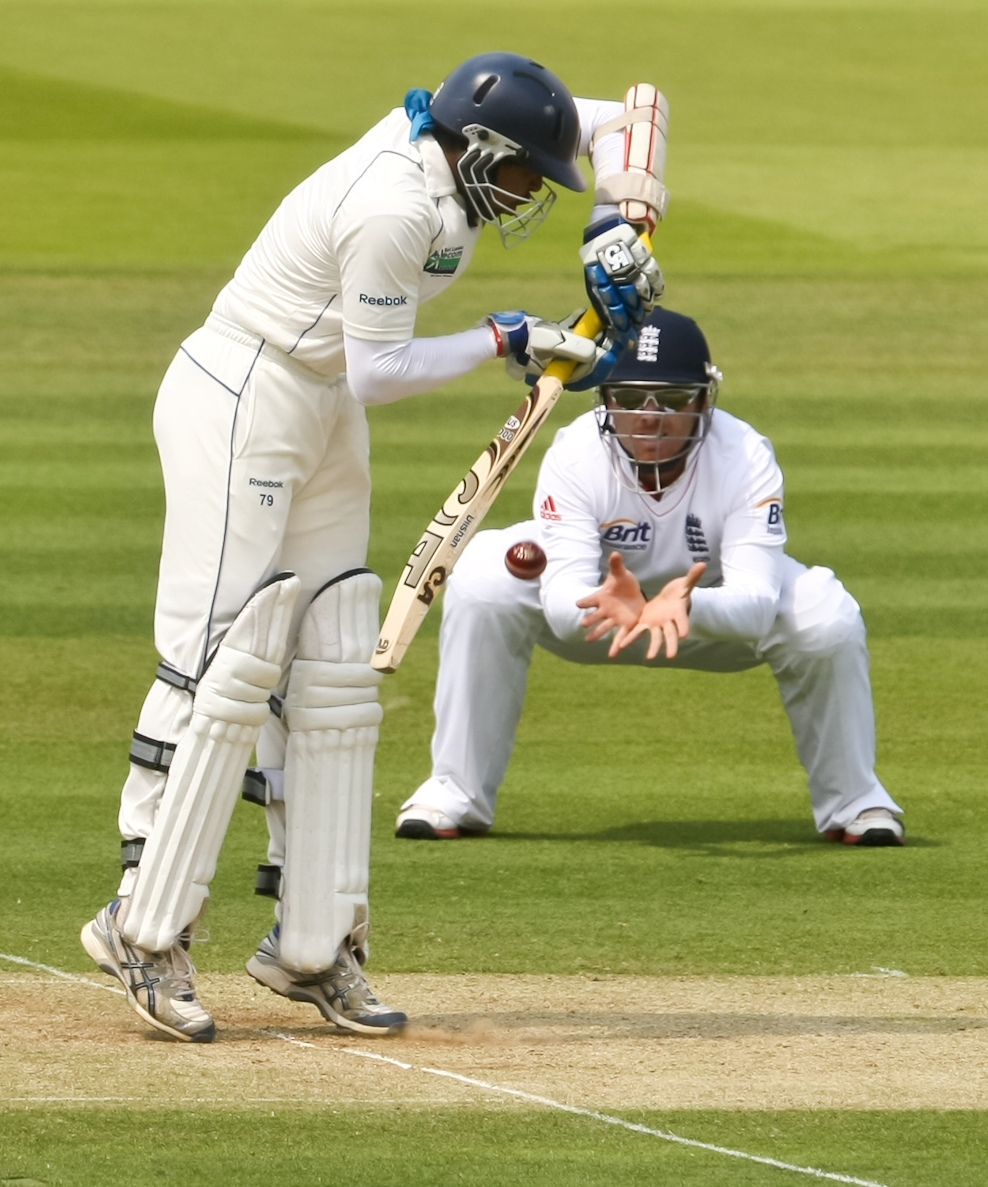
Dilshan playing against England in 2011

=== 2011 Cricket World Cup ===
Dilshan was the top run scorer in the 2011 Cricket World Cup. He scored 500 runs from nine One Day international innings with the best score of 144 runs against Zimbabwe. In the quarter-final against England, Dilshan along with Upul Tharanga, stood double hundred partnerships for the first wicket. This stands as the best ever chasing in a quarterfinal in a World Cup game. He scored two centuries, two half-centuries, 61 boundaries, and four sixes during the tournament which ended at the Wankhede Stadium in Mumbai, India, in April 2011.

He was named in the 'Team of the Tournament' for the 2011 World Cup by the ICC and ESPNcricinfo.

=== Captaincy ===
Immediately after the end of the ICC Cricket World Cup 2011, with Kumar Sangakkara stepping down as captain, Dilshan was appointed the captain of Sri Lanka in all formats of the game. Dilshan said after his retirement in ODIs that, he did not want to take the captaincy, but Sri Lanka Cricket asked him to take the captaincy for six months until they found someone suitable. He accepted the task, but the many troubles in the team such as retirements and injuries led him to reduce performances.

"I didn't actually plan to take the captaincy, but the SLC president asked me to take over for six months until we find someone else," Dilshan said. "Unfortunately, we had also lost two bowlers. Murali Muttiah Muralitharan had retired. Nuwan Kulasekara was injured. Ajantha Mendis was injured. I didn't have great resources. Angelo Mathews had a calf injury for a year that stopped him from bowling. That must be because of my misfortune, because after I had stepped down, we went to Australia, and in that series, Mathews started bowling. That must be because of Mahela's good fortune. At the end of the South Africa series, I put everything aside. I went to Australia, scored 500 runs, and became Man of the Series. It didn't matter to me who was captain. I wasn't concerned about who ousted me as captain. I always play for my country. I didn't worry about those personal things, but I was hurt"

— Tillakaratne Dilshan.

However, his appointment as captain was questioned by cricket fans and pundits alike. Many wondered if he was the right man to lead Sri Lanka. Dilshan scored 193 runs against England at Lord's, breaking the record for the highest individual score made by a Sri Lankan at the venue, and lead Sri Lanka to their maiden test win in South Africa. Losses to England, Australia, Pakistan and South Africa put strain on his captaincy, however, which he relinquished in January 2012.

He also said that he had a lack of support during captaincy tenure and help from former captains and coaches for the team. During Dilshan's captaincy, four coaches were introduced, but none succeeded.

"There actually wasn't anyone who was willing to be captain. Everyone resigned after the 2011 World Cup. In England a ball hit my hand and I broke my finger, and the former captains were asked to lead, and they said no."

— Tillakaratne Dilshan.

Dilshan became the 5th player in international cricket to score centuries in all forms of the game. During the Australian tour of Sri Lanka in 2011, Dilshan scored an unbeaten century of 104* from just 54 balls in the first Twenty20 match of the series, becoming the 5th player to achieve the milestone after West Indian Chris Gayle, New Zealander Brendon McCullum, Indian Suresh Raina and fellow Sri Lankan Mahela Jayawardena and it is also the highest individual twenty20 international score by a Sri Lankan in the history. He scored the century from just 57 balls with 12 fours and 5 sixes. He achieved his century with a dilscoop hitting behind the wicket-keeper.

For his performances in 2011, he was named in the World ODI XI by the ICC. For his performances in 2013, he was named in the World ODI XI by the ICC.

In December 2011, Sri Lanka registered their first ever Test win in South Africa. This also became their first Test win under Dilshan's captaincy. However, after losing the Test series 2–1 and the subsequent ODI series 3–2, Dilshan resigned and was replaced by Mahela Jayawardene. In 2012, he was ranked the second-highest ODI run scorer, with 1119 runs, behind his teammate Kumar Sangakkara. For his performances in 2012, he was named in the ODI XI of the year by ESPNcricinfo.

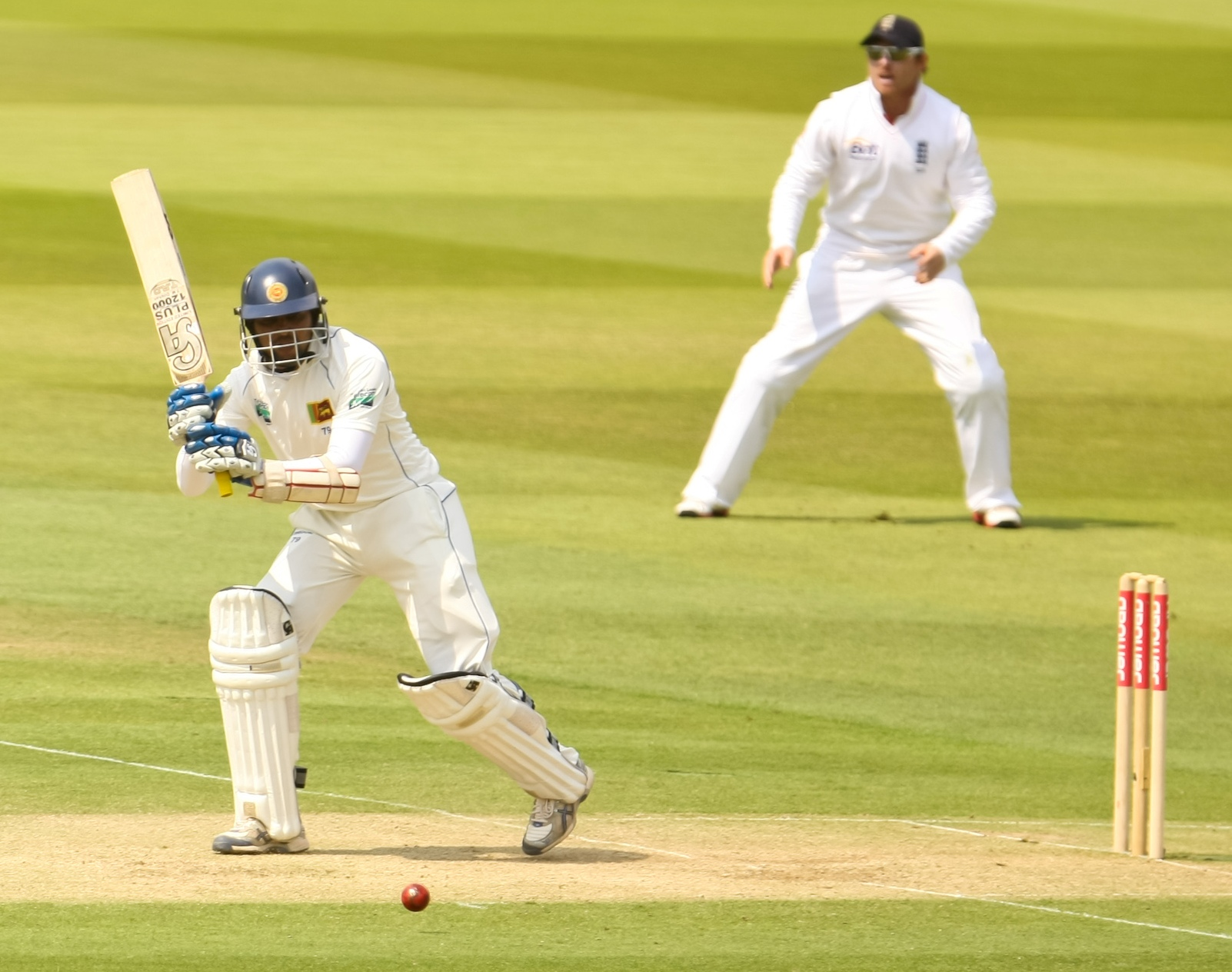
Tillakaratne Dilshan batting at Lord's 2011

=== Test retirement ===
Dilshan announced his retirement from Test cricket on 9 October 2013. Dilshan retired from test cricket in 2013 with his last match being played against Bangladesh at the R. Premadasa Stadium. Dilshan played 87 test matches amassing 5,492 runs, along with 16 centuries and 39 wickets.

=== Dilshan-Shehzad incident ===
On 4 September 2014, the Pakistan Cricket Board (PCB) issued Pakistani cricketer Ahmed Shehzad an official reprimand after his frequent quarrels with Dilshan about Dilshan's past and current religions. Shehzad was caught on camera telling Dilshan:

If you are a non-Muslim and you turn Muslim, no matter whatever you do in your life, straight to heaven.

— Ahmed Shehzad's statement on Dilshan.

=== Through the ranks ===
On 16 December 2014, in his 300th One-Day International, Dilshan scored his 18th ODI century and also passed 9,000 runs in ODIs. He became the fourth Sri Lankan cricketer and 15th overall to achieve this landmark. He also took 3 crucial wickets in the match against England and aided Sri Lanka's title claim as the winners of the tournament. He won both man of the match award and man of the series award.

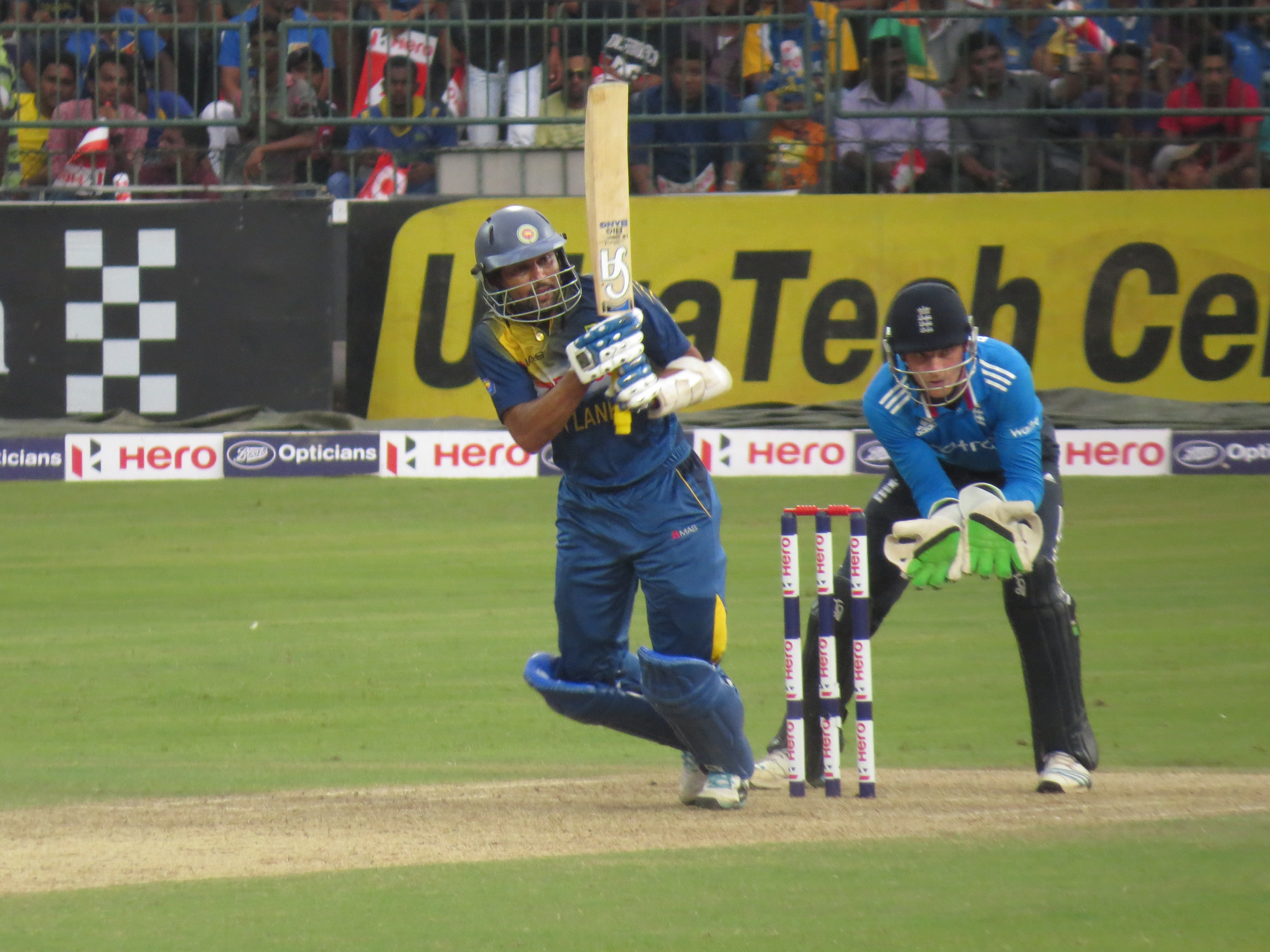
TM Dilshan on his way to his 18th ODI century

On 23 January 2015, Dilshan scored his 20th One-Day International century against New Zealand, becoming the 10th batsmen to score 20 ODI centuries.

=== 2015 Cricket World Cup ===
On 26 February 2015, he scored an unbeaten 161 runs during the group stage match of 2015 ICC Cricket World Cup against Bangladesh. This was his highest individual score in an ODI and was the highest score by a Sri Lankan in Cricket World Cup history, a title previously held by Aravinda de Silva, who scored 145 runs against Kenya in 1996. It was also the highest individual score without a six in ODI history and Dilshan's third score greater than 150. During his innings, he shared a 206* run second wicket partnership with Kumar Sangakkara. This was the highest second wicket partnership for Sri Lanka in ODIs, but was surpassed in the following match between Sri Lanka and England by a 212* run stand between Sangakkara and Lahiru Thirimanne.

On 1 March 2015, during a group match against England, Dilshan took his 100th ODI wicket by dismissing Gary Ballance off his own bowling, thus becoming the third Sri Lankan to score 3000 runs and take 100 wickets after Jayasuriya and Aravinda.

During a group match against Australia, Dilshan scored 24 runs off a Mitchell Johnson over by hitting six consecutive 4s, a first in World Cup history.

Dilshan's teammates, Sangakkara and Mahela, retired from ODI cricket following Sri Lanka's loss to South Africa in the quarterfinals. When asked about retirement, Dilshan stated that until Sri Lanka found a good opening batsman he would continue to feature in the shorter forms of the game for about 2 years or so. Dilshan got out without scoring in the quarterfinals and Sri Lanka exited the World Cup without making the semifinals for the first time since 2003.

=== Post-World Cup ===
On 26 July 2015, Dilshan passed 10,000 ODI runs during the fifth ODI against Pakistan at Hambantota. With this, he became the fourth Sri Lankan and eleventh overall to achieve the milestone. Dilshan was the second person after Sanath Jayasuriya to score more than 4000 ODI runs after the age of 35 and surpassed Jayasuriya's record of 4,142 runs in 2015. Until retirement, Dilshan has scored 4,674 ODI runs after the age of 35, most by a player.

On 9 November 2015, Dilshan became the highest run scorer for Sri Lanka in Twenty20 Internationals passing 1,493 runs of Mahela Jayawardena. With this feat, Dilshan also became the first Sri Lankan and third overall to pass 1,500 T20I runs, milestone achieved after Brendon McCullum, and JP Duminy. Until his retirement, he was only behind McCullum by runs in T20Is.

During the third ODI against New Zealand on 31 December 2015, Dilshan smashed 91 runs to reach another milestone in his career. Dilshan surpassed 1202 runs by Jayasuriya as most runs by an opening batsman for Sri Lanka in a calendar year. Dilshan scored 1207 runs in the year 2015 with 4 hundreds and 6 fifties.

Dilshan finished 2015 ODI arena as the highest ODI run scorer for Sri Lanka and third highest of all-time list. During 25 ODIs played in 2015, Dilshan scored 1,207 runs with the average of 52.47 and strike rate of 90.75. The veteran of 39 years of age, Dilshan showcased incredible all-around ability and had no mercy for the bowlers for all nations, got 4 hundreds and 6 fifties. Until retirement in August, Dilshan has surpassed more than 800 runs each in four consecutive years from 2012 to 2015. For his performances in 2015, he was named in the World ODI XI by ICC.

Dilshan was not totally successful in 2016 Asia Cup, where Sri Lanka lost to Bangladesh and India lost the way to the finals. On 4 March 2016, against Pakistan, Dilshan reached another milestone by hitting 200 fours in all twenty20 internationals and the first player to break 200 fours in T20Is.

Dilshan's consistency as the leading run scorer for Sri Lanka in Twenty20 cricket proved in the 2016 ICC World Twenty20, when he scored unbeaten 83 runs against Afghanistan in a pool match. The innings reached by Afghanistan was 153 and, Dilshan started the innings with showers of four and sixes in a consecutive manner in first six overs. Sri Lanka reached the winning moment in the 19th over with 6 wickets in hand, courtesy of man of the match performance by Dilshan. After that innings, in rest of the pool matches against West Indies and England, Dilshan got out by poor umpire decisions and Sri Lanka eliminated from the first round. Dilshan finished his last international major event as the highest scorer for Sri Lanka with 133 runs at an average of 44.33.

Results in international matches
	Matches	Won	Lost	Drawn	Tied	No result
Test	87	33	28	26	0	–
ODI	330	174	139	–	-	17
T20I	80	43	35	-	1	1

=== Limited over retirement ===
Dilshan was not included in the England tour in 2016; which was due to his personal reasons. But, some local media stated that, the conflict between Dilshan and Sri Lanka Cricket board for his retirement consideration was the actual cause for the refuse for England tour. However, Dilshan denied these rumors. On 25 August 2016, Dilshan announced his retirement from the international arena after the Australian tour. The news stated that, due to immense pressure exerted by the selection committee to reform the limited over squad for upcoming World Cup, the team should have many immediate challenges to do. This forced Dilshan to announce and speed up his intentions to retire from limited overs.

Many Sri Lankan cricketers wished Dilshan and spoke about him as:

"Dilshan is an absolute match-winner and game changer. He deserves the grandest of farewells. The Sri Lanka cricket team will miss him. He enjoyed a champion's career,". "[I hope to see] A full house, a win and all of Sri Lanka applauding Dilshan in his last ODI. He and Sanath Jayasuriya have been our greatest match winners."

— Kumar Sangakkara.

"Opening the batting is the toughest thing in cricket. There's a lot at stake for an opener and not many players excel in that discipline. Dilshan had an outstanding career as an opener in all three formats. He was also a brilliant fielder and an intelligent bowler. All captains wish they have players like Dilshan in their ranks. Dilshan could change games quickly. The dilscoop that he introduced has been played effectively by cricketers in shorter formats of the game with great success. Like Muttiah Muralitharan, Sanath and Romesh Kaluwitharana, he left his mark in cricket."

— Arjuna Ranatunga.

"Dilshan has been an absolutely brilliant servant for Sri Lankan cricket over the past 17 years. I think he has equally done the service that Mahela and Sanga did, and we're going to miss him a lot. Unfortunately, he had called it a day. We respect that decision and the whole team wishes him the very best."

— Angelo Mathews.

He played his last ODI at Rangiri Dambulla Stadium on 28 August 2016. He scored 42 runs in his last ODI innings. As said by skipper Angelo Mathews, the match was dedicated to Dilshan, and a win could give him a good farewell. The ground was covered by many tributes to Dilshan highlighting that "A member of 10,000 run club, A legacy of the Dilscoop", "What a Run", "Dilshan You Have Made Us Proud", and "Thank You Dilshan". However, Sri Lanka lost the match by 2 wickets at the end. Until his retirement from ODIs, Dilshan is the 11th highest ODI scorer of all time and 7th highest century maker of all time.

He played his last Twenty20 International at R Premadasa Stadium on 9 September 2016. He got out for a just single run in the match, but his fielding and bowling came back to the highest level. He took 2 crucial wickets at the end of the Australian innings, by ending 17 years of cricketing career. He ended his international career with a wicket off his last ball. At the time of his retirement, Dilshan was the second highest T20I run scorer of all time. Commentators summarized his career with the quote "Legends Never Retires".

== Road Safety World Series ==
In 2020, Dilshan was announced as the captain of Sri Lanka Legends for the charity T20 cricket tournament titled 2020–21 Road Safety World Series. In the first match against Australia Legends, Dilshan scored 14 runs took 3 wickets, where Sri Lanka Legends won the match by 6 runs. Dilshan won the man of the match award. In the second match, Indian Legends beat Sri Lankan Legends by 5 wickets. However, Sri Lanka Legends later won all the league matches against West Indies, Bangladesh, England and South Africa and became the first team to reach semi finals. Dilshan became the anchor man in every game, where he scored fifties against South Africa and England Legends. In the semi-final against South African Legends, Sri Lanka won the match comfortably and reached the finals. In the final against Indian Legends, Sri Lanka had the momentum to chase the total of 181 posted by Indians, but later fell 14 runs short. However, Dilshan became the Player of the Series due to his allround match winning performances. Dishan is the highest run scorer of the tournament with 271 runs and highest wicket taker with 12 wickets. He also hit the most boundaries (47) in the tournament.

== Beyond cricket ==
On 1 August 2015, Dilshan and fellow Sri Lankan cricketer Muttiah Muralitharan were appointed as the brand ambassadors for the Presidential Task Force to combat kidney disease by the President Maithripala Sirisena.

=== Politics ===
Dilshan publicly displayed his support to Mahinda Rajapaksa at the 2015 Presidential Election. He did so by welcoming Mahinda Rajapakse to Maharagama for an election rally. In 2018, Dilshan announced that he had joined Mahinda Rajapaksa's Sri Lanka Podujana Peramuna party.

In 2018, Dilshan praised the president, Maithripala Sirisena for deciding to implement the Death penalty for drug traffickers. "Not only for drugs, it should be implemented for child abuse and rape cases", he said, adding that the decision should have been made a long time ago.

=== Music and acting ===
After retiring from international cricket, Dilshan and his wife released a video song titled Hema Sansaraye. In February 2021, he released the music video Hitha Hadana Kena.

Dilshan made his television debut in an episode of Kopi Kade drama on 5 April 2017. He also acts alongside his wife in the teleplay Mithuu which is broadcast by Independent Television Network. and was one of the three judges of Sri Lanka's Got Talent reality program conducted by Sirasa TV.

== Personal life ==
Dilshan was married to Nilanka Vithanage, with whom he has a son called Resadu Tillakaratne. After divorcing Dilshan, Nilanka filed a lawsuit over child alimony. He was issued with a notice to appear in court after the 2011 Cricket World Cup, but he refused some of these notices. The case was later settled with Dilshan to pay about 200,000 LKR each month for his ex-wife and his son.

The court case was opened again in 2017, after Dilshan had failed to pay some of the monthly fees. On 24 April 2017, Colombo Magistrate Courts issued an arrest warrant to Dilshan due to his absence in the Court. However, Dilshan finally appeared on court on 25 April 2017.

Dilshan is now married to Sri Lankan actress Manjula Thilini. Their marriage was celebrated in India during the 2008 IPL series. Dilshan has two daughters and two sons from this marriage. Their eldest daughter is Limansa Tillakaratne, and second is Lasadi Dihasansa Tillakaratne. Their elder son is Dihela Dinhath Tillakaratne, and younger son was born in 2017.

Dilshan's brother, Tillakaratne Sampath, is a first-class cricketer in Sri Lanka.

Dilshan is a popular icon at home, and participated in many local events and television programs. He was also appointed as a special judge in Sirasa Superstar, Generation 4. He also participated in a number of entertainment shows, due to his wife's status as a popular Sri Lankan actress.

With the invention of his masterstroke play-Dilscoop, Dilshan models his fashion line with the name 'Dil Scoop'.

On 23 October 2014, Dilshan opened a small-scale luxury hotel, named as "Hotel 'D Pavilion Inn'", situated at Stafford Lane in Kirulapana. The hotel was opened in the presence of the former president of Sri Lanka, Mahinda Rajapakse.

== International records and achievements ==
=== Test matches ===
- He has the highest score scored in Lord's Cricket Ground by a Sri Lankan, where he scored 193 runs in 2013.
- Highest partnership for the fifth wicket – 280 by Tillakaratne Dilshan and Thilan Samaraweera against Bangladesh in 2005.
- Only Sri Lankan to scored centuries in both innings in his 50th Test.

=== One-Day Internationals ===
- Most runs as an opener for Sri Lanka in a calendar year – 1207 runs in 2015.

=== Twenty20 Internationals ===
- Highest run scorer for Sri Lanka – 1,889 runs in 80 matches.
- At the time he retired he was the second-leading run scorer in T20I matches.
- Highest individual score in T20I by a Sri Lankan – 104 not out against Australia in 2011.
- He has the most catches in T20Is by a Sri Lankan – 31 in 80 matches.
- Highest partnership for the first wicket – 124 with Sanath Jayasuriya against West Indies in 2009.
- Highest partnership for the fourth wicket – 104 unbroken with Jeevan Mendis against Australia in 2011.

=== World Cups ===
- Highest individual score by a Sri Lankan – 161 not out against Bangladesh in 2015.
- Highest opening partnership – 282 with Upul Tharanga against Zimbabwe in 2011.
- Oldest cricketer to score a century – 104 against Scotland in 2015.

=== International centuries ===
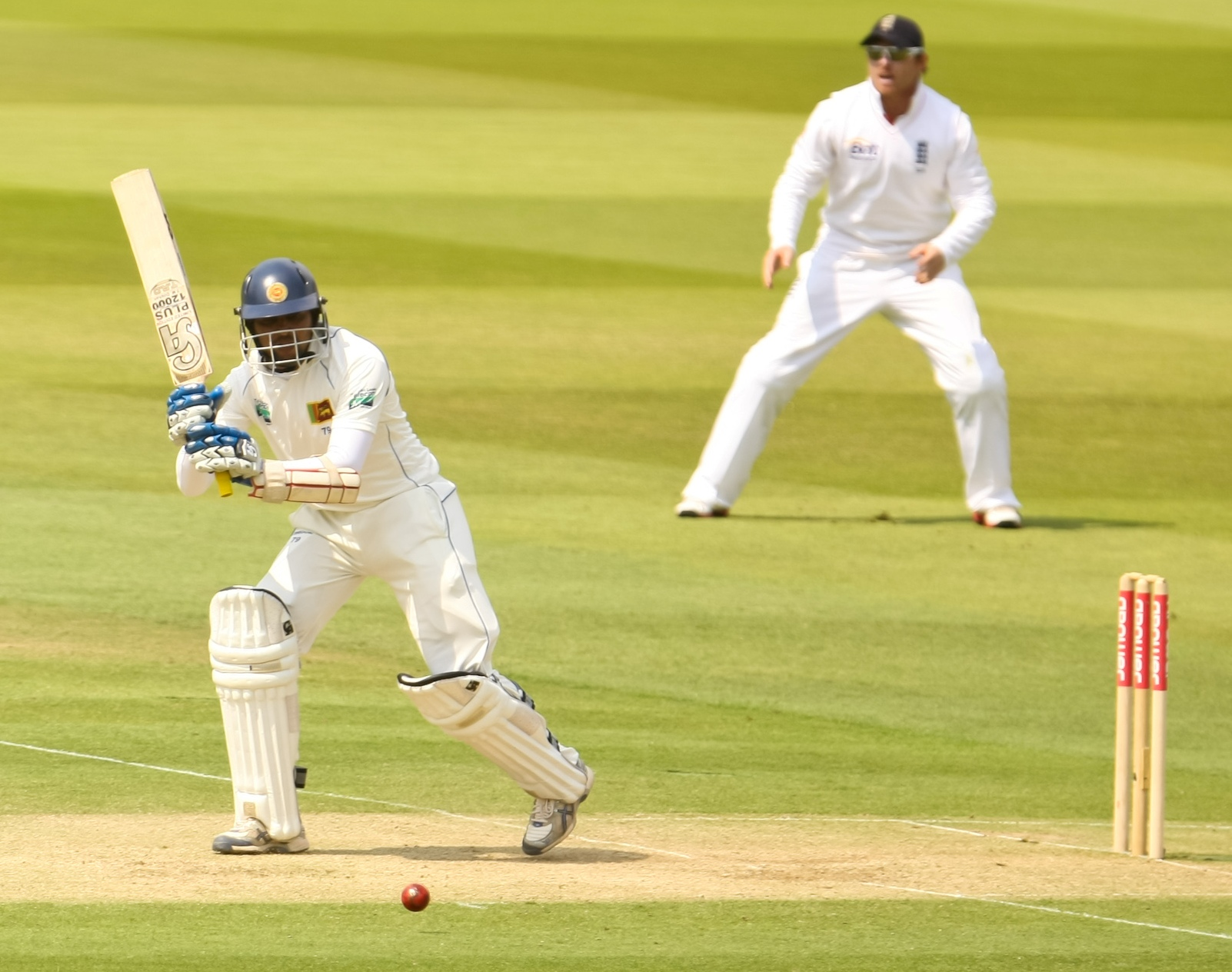
Dilshan batting

Dilshan has 16 Test centuries, 22 One-Day International centuries, and 1 Twenty20 International century. He is the first cricketer in the history to score centuries in all formats as a captain. He is the second Sri Lankan and fifth overall to achieve international centuries in all forms of the game. Dilshan has scored 39 centuries (100 or more runs) in Test matches, One Day International (ODI) matches and Twenty20 International (T20I), organized by the International Cricket Council. Dilshan has scored 16 centuries in Test matches and 22 centuries in ODIs, and one in T20Is.

Dilshan scored his 16th and last Test century on 18 March 2013 at the Galle International Stadium in Galle against Bangladesh. His 17th ODI century comes in his favorite ground Pallekele International Cricket Stadium on 28 July 2013 against South Africa, where at this ground he scored 5 ODI centuries and also his only Twenty20 International century against Australia on 6 August 2011.

In Test matches, Dilshan has scored centuries against all the Test cricket playing nations except South Africa and West Indies, and has scored 150 against four of them. He is seventh on the list of leading Test century makers for Sri Lanka. His centuries have been scored at ten cricket grounds, six of which were outside Sri Lanka. He has been dismissed two times in the nineties.

In ODIs, Dilshan has scored centuries against all test playing opponents except West Indies. His maiden century was made against Netherlands at the VRA Cricket Ground, Amstelveen in 2006. He is third in the list of leading century-makers in ODIs for Sri Lanka. Of these 22 ODI centuries, nine were scored at home grounds and thirteen were at away (opposition's home) or neutral venues. He has been dismissed one time in the ninetynine.

Dilshan scored his only T20I century against Australia in 2011, and became the fifth batsmen to score hundreds in all forms of the game. He scored 104 runs from 57 balls. This is the highest individual score by a Sri Lankan in Twenty20 Internationals.

Test match centuries
No.	Score	Opponent	Venue	Date	Result	Ref
1	163	Zimbabwe	Harare Sports Club	26 November 1999	Sri Lanka won	
2	100	England	Asgiriya Stadium	10 December 2003	Draw	
3	104	Australia	Galle International Stadium	8 March 2004	Sri Lanka lost	
4	168	Bangladesh	P. Saravanamuttu Stadium	20 September 2005	Sri Lanka won	
5	125	India	Sinhalese Sports Club Ground	23 July 2008	Sri Lanka won	
6	162	Bangladesh	Chittagong Divisional Stadium	3 January 2009	Sri Lanka won	
7	143	Bangladesh	Chittagong Divisional Stadium	3 January 2009	Sri Lanka won	
8	145	Pakistan	Gaddafi Stadium	1 March 2009	Draw	
9	123 not out	New Zealand	Galle International Stadium	18 August 2009	Sri Lanka won	
10	112	India	Sardar Patel Stadium	16 November 2009	Draw	
11	109	India	Brabourne Stadium	2 December 2009	Sri Lanka lost	
12	193	England	Lord's	3 June 2011	Draw	
13	101	Pakistan	Galle International Stadium	22 June 2012	Sri Lanka won	
14	121	Pakistan	Sinhalese Sports Club Ground	30 June 2012	Draw	
15	147	Australia	Bellerive Oval	14 December 2012	Sri Lanka lost	
16	126	Bangladesh	Galle International Stadium	8 March 2013	Draw	

One Day International centuries
No.	Score	Opponent	Venue	Date	Result
1	117	Netherlands	VRA Ground	4 July 2006	Sri Lanka won
2	137 not out	Pakistan	Gaddafi Stadium	24 January 2009	Sri Lanka won
3	106	South Africa	SuperSport Park	22 September 2009	Sri Lanka won
4	160	India	Madhavrao Scindia Cricket Ground	15 December 2009	Sri Lanka lost
5	123	India	Vidarbha Cricket Association Ground	18 December 2009	Sri Lanka won
6	104	Bangladesh	Shere Bangla National Stadium	4 January 2010	Sri Lanka won
7	108 not out	Zimbabwe	Harare Sports Club	9 June 2010	Sri Lanka won
8	110	India	Rangiri Dambulla International Stadium	28 August 2010	Sri Lanka won
9	144	Zimbabwe	Pallekele International Cricket Stadium	10 March 2011	Sri Lanka won
10	108 not out	England	R. Premadasa Stadium	26 March 2011	Sri Lanka won
11	160 not out	India	Bellerive Oval	28 February 2012	Sri Lanka lost
12	106	Australia	Adelaide Oval	6 March 2012	Sri Lanka won
13	119 not out	Pakistan	Pallekele International Cricket Stadium	9 June 2012	Sri Lanka won
14	102 not out	New Zealand	Pallekele International Cricket Stadium	6 November 2012	Sri Lanka won
15	113 not out	Bangladesh	Mahinda Rajapaksa International Stadium	23 March 2013	Sri Lanka won
16	125	Bangladesh	Pallekele International Cricket Stadium	28 March 2013	Sri Lanka lost
17	115 not out	South Africa	Pallekele International Cricket Stadium	28 July 2013	Sri Lanka won
18	101	England	R. Premadasa Stadium	16 December 2014	Sri Lanka won
19	116	New Zealand	Seddon Park	15 January 2015	Sri Lanka won
20	116	New Zealand	University Oval	23 January 2015	Sri Lanka lost
21	161 not out	Bangladesh	Melbourne Cricket Ground	26 February 2015	Sri Lanka won
22	104	Scotland	Bellerive Oval	11 March 2015	Sri Lanka won

Twenty20 International centuries
No.	Score	Opponent	Venue	Date	Result
1	104 not out	Australia	Pallekele International Cricket Stadium	6 August 2011	Sri Lanka won

== Acting career ==
=== Filmography ===
Year	Film	Role
2011	Sinhawalokanaya – සිංහාවලෝකනය	Himself

=== Television ===
Year	Teledrama	Role
2017	Kopi Kade	Himself
2018	Mithuu	
2018	Emy	Himself

== Awards and honours ==
- ICC Twenty20 International Performance of the Year 2009
- ICC ODI Team of the Year – included in four years (2009, 2011, 2013, 2015)
- Dialog SLC People's Player of the Year 2015 (with 493,196 votes)
- Dialog SLC T20 Batsman of the Year 2015
