= E. L. Senanayake Children's Park =

Park in Kandy, Sri Lanka

Coordinates: 7.287454°N 80.647494°E

- Interactive map of E. L. Senanayake Children's Park
- Type: Urban park
- Location: Ampitiya, Central Province
- Nearest city: Kandy, Central Province, Sri Lanka

E. L. Senanayake Children's Park (formerly known as George E. De Silva Park) is an Urban Children's park in the city of Kandy, Central Province, Sri Lanka. Situated at the Ampitiya junction along the Kandy Lake Round Road, it the first children’s park, and one of the oldest parks in the city. The park is named in honour of E. L. Senanayake, former mayor of Kandy and prominent Sri Lankan politician.

== See also ==
- George E. de Silva
