= The Voice Sri Lanka Season 1 =

The Voice Sri Lanka
- Season 1
- Season 1 Promotional Poster
- Hosted by: Dinithi Walgamage _{(Blind Auditions)} Kingsley Rathnayake _{(The Battles)} Sumiran Dhananjaya Gunasekara _{(The Knockouts Onwards)}
- Coaches: Umaria Sinhawansa; Bathiya and Santhush (BNS); Sashika Nisansala; Kasun Kalhara
- No. of contestants: 150+
- Winner: Harith Wijeratne
- Winning coach: Umaria Sinhawansa
- Runners-up: Julius Mitchell; Miyuru Somarathne; Thilina Sudesh

Release
- Original network: Sirasa TV
- Original release: November 21, 2020 – December 11, 2021

Season chronology
- Next → The Voice Sri Lanka Season 2

The inaugural season of the Sri Lankan reality talent show The Voice Sri Lanka premiered on November 21, 2020, on Sirasa TV. The season was hosted by Dinithi Walgamage (Blind Auditions), Kingsley Rathnayake (Battle Rounds), and Sumiran Dhananjaya Gunasekara (Knockouts onwards).

The original coaching panel consisted of Umaria Sinhawansa, Bathiya and Santhush (BNS), Sashika Nisansala, and Kasun Kalhara.

Harith Wijeratne was named the winner of the inaugural season, marking Umaria Sinhawansa's first victory as a coach. He gained national attention for his emotional singing style and technical control.

== Coaches and host ==
The hosts for the inaugural season were Dinithi Walgamage, an actress who hosted the Blind Auditions; Kingsley Rathnayake, who took over during the Battle Rounds; and Sumiran Dhananjaya Gunasekara, who became the main host from the Knockouts onwards.

The coaching panel featured prominent figures in the Sri Lankan music industry:

- Umaria Sinhawansa – A celebrated Sri Lankan singer known for her powerful vocals and stage presence.
- Bathiya and Santhush (BNS) – A musical duo famous for blending Sinhala pop with hip-hop and R&B.
- Kasun Kalhara – A soulful vocalist and composer known for his emotional ballads.
- Sashika Nisansala – A classically trained vocalist with a strong background in playback singing. She is one of Sri Lanka’s most accomplished and celebrated vocalists, having performed more than 70 teledrama theme songs and over 20 film songs.

== Teams ==
Color key

- Winner
- Other Finalist
- Eliminated in the Semi-finals
- Eliminated in the Final 12 Round

Coaches	Top Artists		
Umaria Sinhawansa	Harith Wijeratne	Naveesha Sooriyaarachchi	Midori Karunaratne
Bathiya and Santhush (BNS)	Julius Mitchell	Prakash K.	Channuka
Sashika Nisansala	Miyuru Somarathne	Imesha Thathsarani	
Kasun Kalhara	Thilina Sudesh	Ashka Kulathunga	

== Grand Finale (December 11, 2021) ==
The Grand Finale was broadcast live on December 11, 2021. The Top 4 finalists performed three times during the broadcast: a solo performance, an Encore Song, and a duet with their respective coach.

Harith Wijeratne was announced as the champion based on Sri Lanka's public SMS voting results. The finale was a massive success, drawing in an estimated 9.8 million viewers.

=== Competition performances ===
Artist	Coach	Solo Song	Duet Song (with Coach)	Encore Song	Result
Harith Wijeratne	Umaria Sinhawansa	#1 "My Heart Will Go On"	#5 "Hanthana Sihine"	#9 "Hemin Sere"	Winner
Julius Mitchell	Bathiya and Santhush (BnS)	#2 "Perfect"	#6 "Lassana Dedak"	#10 "Saragaye"	Finalist
Miyuru Somarathne	Sashika Nisansala	#3 "Sihina Mawannathi"	#7 "Oba Ma Hamuwuna Da"	#11 "Sithin Ma Nosali"	Finalist
Thilina Sudesh	Kasun Kalhara	#4 "Saman Mal Piyalle"	#8 "Ananthayata Yana Para Dige"	#12 "Mitwa"	Finalist

=== Non-competition performances ===
Order	Title / Segment	Performers	Song(s)
1.1	Opening Act	Season 1 Top Artists	Traditional Medley
1.2	Tribute Performance to Victor Rathnayake	Season 1 Top Artists	Victor Rathnayake Songs Medley
1.3	Team Umaria Group Song	Coach Umaria and Team Umaria	"Rangume"; "Rathu Eli"; "Gum Nade"; "Manda Pama"
1.4	Team Sashika Group Song	Coach Sashika and Team Sashika	"Sanda Eliya"; "Chandra Payanna"; "Akasaye Dura Gimhana"; "Malsara Hee Sarin"
1.5	Team Kasun Group Song	Coach Kasun and Team Kasun	"Adaraneeya Wassane"; "Sanda Mithuri"; "Mal Mitak Thiyanna"; "Adarema Geethayak"
1.6	Team BnS Group Song	Coach BnS and Team BnS with Yohani & Kaizer Kaiz	"Unmada Prema Geeya"; "Ran Kurahan Mala"; "Chandani Payala"; "Hinipeththatama Nega"

== Promotional releases ==
- "Nim Him Sewwa" (Season 1 Promotional Single): Shortly after Season 1 debuted, the original coaching panel recorded a collaborative promotional single—a bilingual Sinhalese and English cover of Pandit W.D. Amaradeva's iconic 1978 classic "Nim Him Sewwa". The music video amassed over 1.2 million views online, and the arrangement became a staple in coach Umaria Sinhawansa's live concert setlists. The promotional video ended with the slogan "Celebrating Our Music Legends of Yesterday, Today, and Tomorrow," leading the public to refer to the original coach panel as the "Legend Coaches".

== Reception ==
Season 1 was a strong debut season, running for over 80 episodes and capturing an average viewership of 3 million, peaking at 9.8 million viewers for the finale.

The franchise has achieved massive popularity across Sri Lanka, establishing a multi-tier presence through adaptations like The Voice Sri Lanka, The Voice Teens, and The Voice Kids. The franchise maintains a strong digital footprint, with contest performances, promotional clips, and post-performance "V Clapper" content consistently drawing millions of views online. By October 2023, the franchise's official YouTube channel had accumulated over 684 million total views.
