= The Voice Sri Lanka Season 3 =

The Voice Sri Lanka
- Season 3
- The Voice Sri Lanka Season 3 official banner
- Hosted by: Sumiran Dhananjaya Gunasekara
- Coaches: Mihindu Ariyaratne; Hirushi Jayasena; Raini Charuka; Supun Perera
- No. of contestants: 40+ artists
- Winner: Imesh Sandeepa
- Winning coach: Supun Perera
- Runner-up: Isaac Timothy

Release
- Original network: Sirasa TV
- Original release: December 14, 2024 – June 14, 2025

Season chronology
- ← Previous; The Voice Sri Lanka Season 2

The third season of the Sri Lankan reality talent show The Voice Sri Lanka premiered on December 14, 2024, on Sirasa TV and was hosted by Sumiran Dhananjaya Gunasekara. The third season featured an all-new, dynamic, and youth-oriented coaching panel replacing the original lineup from Seasons 1 and 2.

The season 3 coaching panel comprised Mihindu Ariyaratne, Hirushi Jayasena, Raini Charuka (a returning coach from Seasons 1 and 2 of Sri Lanka's The Voice Teens), and Supun Perera, who stepped up from the Season 2 "Comeback Stage" to the main coaching panel.

In a franchise first for Sri Lanka, Season 3 introduced an all-new dynamic studio set built entirely in-house at Stein Studios. The season also introduced the new Block Button feature, an LED panel floor, and a modernized stage layout.

Imesh Sandeepa was named the winner of this season, marking Supun Perera's second consecutive victory as a coach.

== Coaches and host ==
Sumiran Dhananjaya Gunasekara returned to front the series as host. The judges' lineup saw a complete overhaul for Season 3, with Mihindu Ariyaratne, Hirushi Jayasena, Raini Charuka, and Supun Perera taking over the red chairs.

== Teams ==
Color key

- Winner
- Runner-up
- Other Finalist
- Eliminated in the Live shows
- Eliminated in the Knockout rounds
- Eliminated in the Battle rounds

Coaches	Top Artists			
Mihindu Ariyaratne	Rasidu Mihisara	—	—	—
Hirushi Jayasena	Lisara Fernando	—	—	—
Raini Charuka	Isaac Timothy	—	—	—
Supun Perera	Imesh Sandeepa	—	—	—

== Blind Auditions Highlights ==
Color key:

✔	Coach hit his/her "I WANT YOU" button
	Artist selected to join this coach's team
	Artist defaulted to this coach's team
✘	Coach pressed "I WANT YOU" button, but was blocked by another coach from getting the artist
	Artist eliminated with no coach pressing his or her "I WANT YOU" button

Artist	Song	Coach's and artist's choices			
Artist	Song	Mihindu	Hirushi	Raini	Supun
Madushanka Bandara	"Sansarini"	—	✔	—	✔
Thevinu Kularathna	"Angam Keliya"	—	✔	—	—
Thushadhi Nethmini	"Mihiraviye"	—	—	—	—
Gema	"Mottu"	—	—	—	—
Tharanga Perera	"Sigiri Sukumaliye"	—	✔	—	—
Rashini Pasquel	"Wasanthaye Mal Kekulai"	✔	✔	—	✔
Warunica Ridmi	"Scars to Your Beautiful"	—	✔	—	✔
Kaushalya Liyanage	"Sihinen Sihinen"	—	—	—	—
Vishwa Fernando	"Malee"	—	✔	✔	—
Sithara Herath	"Apa Hamuweema Wenweema"	—	—	—	—
Bhanu Prabasha	"Romantic Opera"	✔	✔	✔	✔
Chathura Wanigasekara	"Rosa Malakui"	✔	—	—	✔
Sandunika Sewwandi	"Shaheena"	✘	✔	✔	✔
Gawesh Kaushan	"Uththama Wan Lowa Pathala"	✔	✔	✔	✔
Prasadini Yashodya	"Me Uyan Kone"	—	✔	—	—
Amila Edirisinghe	"Sumudu Walawaka"	—	✔	—	✔
Nishaya Dewthilini	"Maga Bala Bala"	—	✔	✔	—
Shammika Aththanayake	"Ran Wan Wantha"	✔	—	✔	—
Nimesh Kalinga	"Unuhuma"	—	—	—	—
Tharindu Perera	"Sinhayo"	✔	—	—	✔
Dinitha Basnayake	"Ayarin Josapin"	—	—	—	✔
Dulari Hirunika	"Me Saumya Rathriya"	✔	✔	—	✔
Ridmi Sulochana	"Vijithaya Adaraye"	—	—	—	—
Anagi Manakulasooriya	"Thattu Karanna"	—	✔	✔	✔
Kalindu De Silva	"Obe Namin"	✔	✔	✔	✔
Derrick Keil	"Mee Wadayaki Jeewithe"	✔	✔	—	✔
Chamod Rukshan	"Wehi Pabalu Seli"	✔	✔	✔	—
Naveed Reyaldeen	"Wasana Lowak"	—	—	—	✔
K.Sudarshana	"Sewwandiyakata Pem Banda"	✔	✔	✔	✔
Saween Gunawardhana	"Radhawani"	—	—	✔	✔
Double Note	"Nosalei Diwi Makulu Esa"	✔	✔	✔	✔
Roshan Bharatha	"Saragaye"	✔	✔	—	✔
Napthali Silva	"Olinda Kale Himidiriye"	✔	—	—	✔
Malki Karunarathne	"Punsanda Reta Awidin"	✔	✔	✔	✔
Samya Vishma	"Mal Mal Sariya"	—	—	✔	✔

== Grand Finale (June 14, 2025) ==
The Grand Finale was broadcast live from Stein Studios on Saturday, June 14, 2025. The Top 4 finalists performed two times during the broadcast: a solo performance and a duet with their respective coach.

Imesh Sandeepa was announced as the champion based on Sri Lanka's public SMS voting results, securing coach Supun Perera's second consecutive victory on the series.

=== Competition performances ===
Coach	Artist	Order	Solo Song	Order	Duet Song (with Coach)	Result
Raini Charuka	Isaac Timothy	1	"Beggin'"	5	"Bring Me to Life"	Finalist
Supun Perera	Imesh Sandeepa	2	"Sun Raha Hai"	6	"Mahamaya"	Winner
Hirushi Jayasena	Lisara Fernando	3	"Livin' la Vida Loca"	7	"Allannata Be Ma"	Finalist
Mihindu Ariyaratne	Rasidu Mihisara	4	"Sithin Witharak"	8	"Chakithaya"	Finalist

=== Non-competition performances ===
Order	Title / Segment	Performers	Song(s)
1.1	Opening Act	Season 3 Top Artists	Grand Finale Opening Production
1.2	Coaches' Opening Act	The Coaching Panel (Mihindu, Hirushi, Raini, and Supun)	"Yaksha Pelapatha" (යක්ෂ පෙළපත)
4.1	Tribute to Guest Invitees / International Delegates	Season 3 Top Artists	"We Are the World"
8.1	Special Tribute Performance	Season 3 Top Artists	Tribute to late Malini Fonseka (Several Sinhalese movie songs)
8.2	Coaches' Medley (Team Performances)	The Coaching Panel with their team members	"Yana Thanaka" (Team Mihindu); "Kathirina" (Team Hirushi); "Wisikkeruwa Hitha" (Team Raini); "Naden" (Team Supun)

== Production and technical achievements ==
=== Stein Studios Local Set Build ===
Building the entire set locally at Stein Studios was a technological milestone for Sri Lankan broadcast production. Constructing an international-standard set domestically demonstrated local production engineering capabilities, earning validation from ITV Studios—the global owner of The Voice format—for meeting international franchise specifications.

== Music and media ==
=== Promotional releases ===
- "Yaksha Pelapatha" (Season 3 Theme Song): Marking the return of the show for its third season, the new coaching panel—Mihindu Ariyaratne, Hirushi Jayasena, Raini Charuka, and Supun Perera—released the official theme song "Yaksha Pelapatha" (යක්ෂ පෙළපත). Written by Chandana Sooriyabandara and composed by Tharindu Ranathunga, the high-energy track reflected the season’s revamped, youth-oriented branding.

== Reception ==
The franchise has achieved massive popularity across Sri Lanka, establishing a multi-tier presence through three concurrent adaptations: The Voice Sri Lanka, The Voice Teens, and The Voice Kids. The franchise maintains a strong digital footprint, with contest performances, promotional clips, and post-performance "V Clapper" content consistently drawing millions of views online. By October 2023, the official YouTube channel had accumulated over 684 million total views.
