= Abhisheka Wimalaweera =

Sri Lankan vocalist

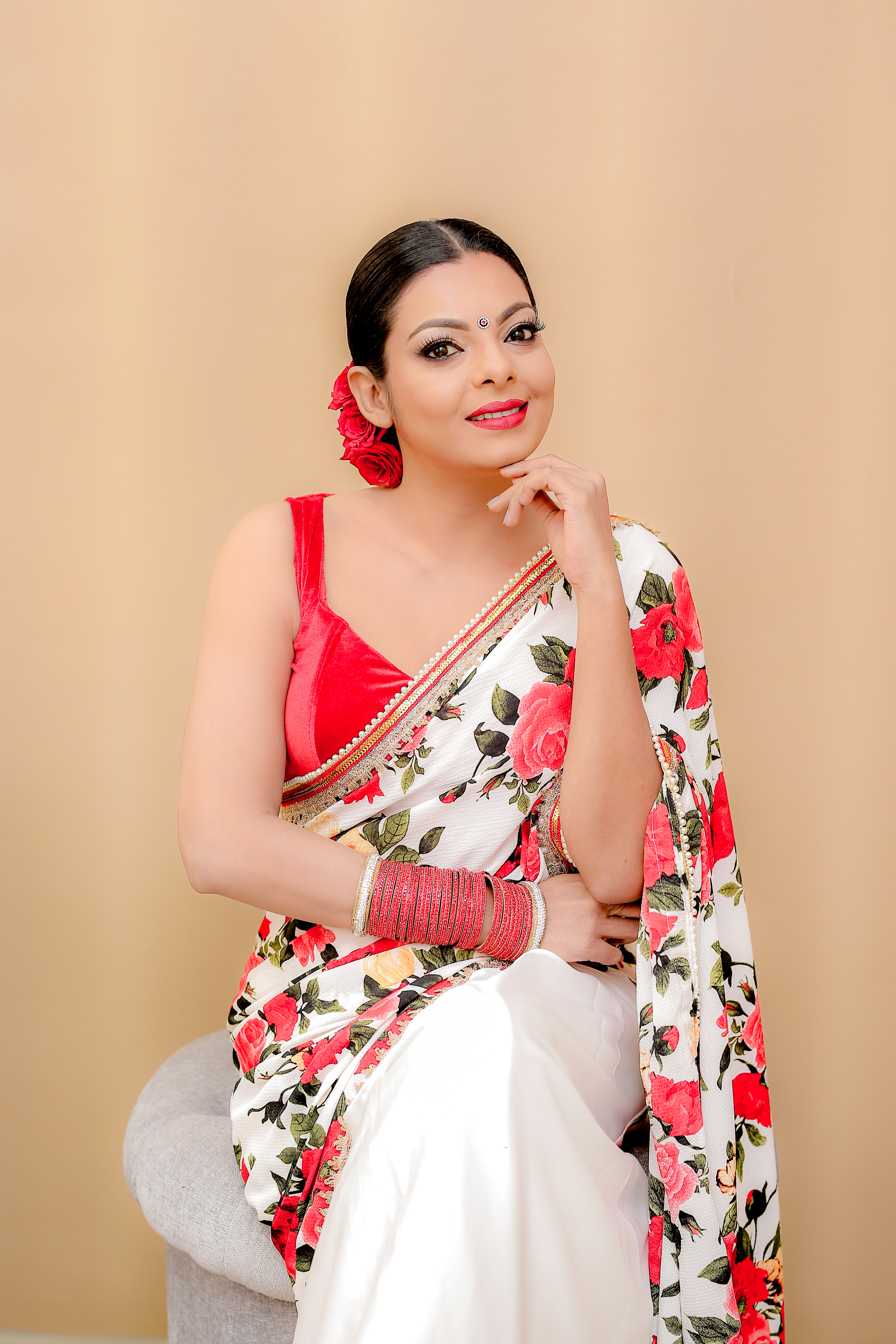
- Born: 11 November 1988 (age 38); Galle, Southern, Sri Lanka
- Other name: Abhi
- Education: University of Colombo; University of Kelaniya; Bhatkhande Sanskriti Vishwavidyalaya
- Occupations: Singer,Lyricist, Novelist,Entrepreneur
- Years active: 2009–present
- Known for: Winning Coach of The Voice Teens Sri Lanka -2022
- Height: 5 ft (1.5 m)
- Spouse: Niran Alahakoon (m. 2012)
- Children: 1

Suhasini Abhisheka Wimalaweera (Sinhala: සුහාසිනී අභිෂේකා විමලවීර; born 11 November 1988) is a Sri Lankan singer, an entrepreneur, traditional skincare practitioner, novelist, and lyricist. and lyricist. In 2022, she served as the winning coach on the reality show The Voice Teens Sri Lanka".

As of 2026, her song "Dekopul Kandulin Thema" ranks as the 11th most-streamed Sinhala-language song on Spotify.

== Early life ==
Abhisheka was born on 11 November 1988 in Galle, Sri Lanka. She is the only child of Sunil Wimalaweera who was a Film Director, Lyricist and Author, and Damayanthi Wimalaweera. She completed her primary education at Sacred Heart Convent Galle. Then she attended St. Paul's Girls School, Milagiriya to complete her secondary education. In 2006 Abhisheka received the title Sangeet Visharad from Bhatkhande Music Institute Deemed University in India, Lucknow. In 2013 she received the Bachelor of Arts degree for Music from University of Colombo, Sri Lanka. In 2019, she joined the University of Colombo as a lecturer in Music.

In 2020 she completed her master's degree in music at the University of Kelaniya, Sri Lanka.

She is married to Niran Alahakoon and the couple has a daughter named Fairy Abhilashya Alahakoon.

== Career ==
=== Early career ===
Abhisheka Wimalaweera began her professional singing career as a playback singer, contributing to Sinhala film and television soundtracks. Her early recordings included "Mangalam Pathala" from the film Sanjana, directed by Hemasiri Sellaperuma. In 2009, she performed "Nil Nuwan Pathu Sema" for Sinasuna Adaren, directed by Eranga Senaratne. In 2011, filmmaker Udayakantha Warnasuriya selected her to perform "Prarthana Bidi Na" for the film Challenges. She subsequently performed "Heena Dam Mitak" in 2013.

In 2014, she contributed to the soundtracks of two films. She performed "Me Minisath Bawe Lowe" for Que Sera, directed by Parakrama Jayasinghe, and collaborated with Lahiru Perera on Hawasaka Ma, a duet featured in Rupantharana, directed by Nalaka Withange. The latter became one of her widely recognised film recordings. In 2018, she performed "Madhu Sandakan" for Wassanaye Sanda, directed by Udayakantha Warnasuriya.

=== Teledrama playback singing ===
Wimalaweera's work in television music included the theme song Dekopul Kandulin Thema for the teledrama Ama, performed with Lahiru Perera. The recording became one of her most recognised early performances.

In 2015, she performed "Hithe Inne Den Oyamai" for the teledrama Adarei Man Adarei, broadcast on Hiru TV. She also contributed to the theme songs "Charithayakata Paata Denna" and "Me Nisha Yamaye" for productions broadcast on the Independent Television Network. Her subsequent television recordings included "Apa Hamu Nowuna Nam", the theme song of the teledrama Ras, broadcast on Sirasa TV.

=== Solo recording career ===
Wimalaweera subsequently developed a solo recording career, releasing original songs alongside her playback work. Her early solo releases included "Seema Na", followed by "Ridi Ridi" and "Aye Numba Na Kiya".

In December 2017, she released Nissara, written by Wimalaweera and composed by Dilum Thejana Hettiarachchi. The song became a commercial success and one of the defining recordings of her solo career. Its popularity contributed to her growing recognition as a solo artist and songwriter.

=== Return to music ===
After a period of reduced musical activity, Wimalaweera returned with Mathaka, a duet with veteran singer Karunarathna Divulgane. Officially released in February 2021, the song received substantial attention on digital music platforms and became another widely recognised recording in her career.

In 2022, she collaborated with Pranirsha Thiyagaraja, winner of the second season of The Voice Teens Sri Lanka, on the song Sabadini. The recording reached the number-one position on the Sri Lankan YouTube trending chart following its release.

After several years away from film playback singing, Wimalaweera returned to the field with recordings for later film productions. In 2023, she performed the theme song for Kandak Sema, the film adaptation of the novel by Sumithra Rahubaddhe.

In 2024, she collaborated with veteran singer Nanda Malini on Sapathniroshayak, the theme song of the teledrama Take Care. Her contribution received recognition at the year's music awards, where she won the Best Female Singer of the Year award and was nominated for Best Lyricist of the Year.

In 2025, she performed "Araliya Mal Thunak" for the film Mother Lanka, marking another contribution to film playback singing.

=== Digital popularity ===
Several of her recordings accumulated millions of plays across digital music platforms.

Reported combined plays on Spotify and YT Music
| Song | Approximate plays (2026) |
|---|---|
| "Dekopul Kandulin Thema" | 19 million |
| "Hawasaka Ma" | 17 million |
| "Nissara" | 11 million |
| "Mathaka" | 10 million |
| "Sabadini" | 6 million |

=== Live performances ===
==== ABHI Live in Concert ====
In 2022, Wimalaweera launched ABHI Live in Concert, a solo concert series. The inaugural concert was held at the Nelum Pokuna Mahinda Rajapaksa Theatre in Colombo. The concert attracted considerable public interest, with tickets reportedly selling out within 48 hours.

=== Television career ===
Wimalaweera's television career includes appearances as a judge and coach on several Sri Lankan singing competitions. She served as a judge on Junior Superstar, broadcast by Sirasa TV, from 2017 to 2018.

In 2022, she joined the second season of The Voice Teens Sri Lanka as a coach, alongside Lahiru Perera, Raini Charuka and Sanka Dineth. Her contestant, Pranirsha Thiyagaraja, won the season.

In 2025, she served as a judge on the first season of Hiru Kids Star, broadcast by Hiru TV. In 2026, she returned as a coach for the third season of The Voice Teens Sri Lanka.

Television appearances
| Year | Programme | Channel | Role |
|---|---|---|---|
| 2017–2018 | Junior Superstar | Sirasa TV | Judge |
| 2022 | The Voice Teens Sri Lanka (Season 2) | Sirasa TV | Coach (Winning Coach) |
| 2025 | Hiru Kids Star (Season 1) | Hiru TV | Judge |
| 2026 | The Voice Teens Sri Lanka (Season 3) | Sirasa TV | Coach |

== TOURS ==
Abhi Live in Concert
- Concert series tour by Abhisheka Wimalaweera
- Location: Sri Lanka
- Start date: 12 November 2022
- End date: 14 November 2026
- Legs: -
- No. of shows: 9

Abhi Live in Concert is a solo concert series by Sri Lankan singer Abhisheka Wimalaweera, launched in 2022. The series was conceived as a musical journey across all nine provinces of Sri Lanka, beginning in Colombo and subsequently expanding to several cities across the island.

ABHI Live in Concert (2022)

=== Concert history ===
| Year | City | Venue | Theme song | Notes | Trailer |
|---|---|---|---|---|---|
| 2022 | Colombo | Nelum Pokuna Mahinda Rajapaksa Theatre | Thawama Pana Thiyenawa | Record-breaking concert; the first concert in the series. Sold out in under 48 hours, causing the MyTickets website to go down for hours due to heavy traffic. | Watch |
| 2023 | Kandy | Bogambara Prison | Adare Nuwarata Sapayak | Sold out within 48 hours. First concert ever held at the historic Bogambara Prison. | Watch |
| 2023 | Galle | Moon Bastion, Galle Fort | Dannawada Adare Nithiya | Sold out in under 72 hours; reportedly the most crowded concert in the series. | Watch |
| 2024 | Anuradhapura | Abhimansala, Anuradhapura | Upanda Sita (duet with Pranirsha Thiyagaraja) | Sold out within days. Sujatha Attanayake attended the concert. | Watch |
| 2024 | Ratnapura | National Museum, Ratnapura | Thaththe | Sold out. | Watch |
| 2025 | Kurunegala | Kurunegala Open Air Theatre | Idikatu Wahivi | Concert in the North Western Province. | Watch |
| 2025 | Jaffna | Thiruvalluvar Cultural Centre | Samahara Nam (duet with Pranirsha Thiyagaraja) | A solo concert following Sujatha Attanayake's concert in Jaffna in the 1980s. Sold out. | Watch |
| 2026 | Badulla | Namunukula Open Air Theatre, Uva Wellassa University | Daruwo Wagema (duet with Suneera Sumanga) | Reportedly the second-most crowded concert in the series. Sold out. | Watch |
| 2026 | Ampara | Hardy Advanced Technological Institute, Ampara | Pichcha Welata Duka Hituna | Sold out. the final concert in the series. | Watch |

== Discography ==
=== Singles and collaborative recordings ===
2026
| No. | Title | Length |
|---|---|---|
| 1. | "Pichcha Welata Duka Hithuna" | 3:52 |
| 2. | "Daruwo Wagema" (with Suneera Sumanga) | 6:03 |
| 3. | "Dahas Gananak" (with Bimal Jayakody) | 4:20 |

2025
| No. | Title | Length |
|---|---|---|
| 1. | "Samahara Nam" (with Pranirsha Thiyagaraja) | 3:58 |
| 2. | "Araliya Mal Thunak" | 5:28 |

2024
| No. | Title | Length |
|---|---|---|
| 1. | "Indikatu Wahivi" | 4:11 |
| 2. | "Mage Duwe Oba" | 4:28 |
| 3. | "Thaththe" | 3:44 |
| 4. | "Sapathnirooshayak" (with Nanda Malini) | 4:55 |
| 5. | "Upanda Sita" (with Pranirsha Thiyagaraja) | 3:59 |

2023
| No. | Title | Length |
|---|---|---|
| 1. | "Dannawada Adare Nithiya" | 3:27 |
| 2. | "Ahe Kadulali" | 5:56 |
| 3. | "Adare Nuwarata Sapayak" | 2:30 |

2022
| No. | Title | Length |
|---|---|---|
| 1. | "Wahi Kawiya" | 3:00 |
| 2. | "Thawama Pana Thiyenawa" | 5:14 |
| 3. | "Sabandini" (with Pranirsha Thiyagaraja) | 5:03 |
| 4. | "Ipadune Dinanna" (with Sanka Dineth, Raini Charuka, La Signore and Stephanie Siriwardhana) | 3:38 |

2021
| No. | Title | Length |
|---|---|---|
| 1. | "Mathaka" (with Karunarathna Divulgane) | 4:00 |

2020
| No. | Title | Length |
|---|---|---|
| 1. | "Chandramandale (Reply Song)" | 3:51 |
| 2. | "Apa Hamu Nowuna Nam" | 2.51 |

2019
| No. | Title | Length |
|---|---|---|
| 1. | "Nethra" | 3:13 |

2017
| No. | Title | Length |
|---|---|---|
| 1. | "Rosa Kumarune" | 3:45 |
| 2. | "Nissara" | 3:27 |

2016
| No. | Title | Length |
|---|---|---|
| 1. | "Aye Numba Na Kiya" | 2:57 |

2015
| No. | Title | Length |
|---|---|---|
| 1. | "Ridi Ridee" | 3:30 |
| 2. | "Kaha Pata Arunelle" | 3:38 |

2014
| No. | Title | Length |
|---|---|---|
| 1. | "Hawasaka Ma" (with La Signore) | 3:05 |

2012
| No. | Title | Length |
|---|---|---|
| 1. | "Seema Na" | 3:34 |

2011
| No. | Title | Length |
|---|---|---|
| 1. | "Dekopul Kandulin Thema" (with La Signore) | 2:56 |
| 2. | "Prarthana Bidee" (with Surendra Perera) | 4:22 |

== Filmography ==
=== Playback singing ===
| Year | Song | Movie | Director |
|---|---|---|---|
| 2009 | "Nil Nuwan Pathu Sema" | Sinasuna Adaren | Eranga Senaratne |
| 2011 | "Prarthana Bidee" | Challenges | Udayakantha Warnasuriya |
| 2013 | "Heena Dam Mitak" | — | — |
| 2014 | "Me Minisath Bawe Lowe" | Que Sera | Parakrama Jayasinghe |
| 2014 | "Hawasaka Ma" | Rupantharana | Nalaka Withange |
| 2015 | "Mangalam Pathala" | Sanjana | Hemasiri Sellapperuma |
| 2018 | "Madhu Sandakan" | Wassanaye Sanda | Udayakantha Warnasuriya |
| 2023 | "Seba Jeevithaya" | Kandak Sema | Ashoka Athaudahetti |
| 2025 | "Araliya Mal Thunak" | Mother Lanka | Anusha Sanjeewa Edirimuni |
