= Chandana Sooriyabandara =

Sri Lankan journalist and media personality

- චන්දන සූරියබණ්ඩාර
- Born: 1965 (age 60–61); Watapuluwa, Kandy District, Sri Lanka
- Occupations: Journalist, television host, media executive
- Years active: 1990s–present
- Known for: Host of Sirasa Lakshapathi (2011–2025)
- Spouse: Tharaka Wasalamudaliarachchi
- Children: 3
- Relatives: Saddha Mangala Sooriyabandara (brother)

Chandana Sooriyabandara (Sinhala: චන්දන සූරියබණ්ඩාර; born c. 1965) is a Sri Lankan journalist, television host, and media executive. He served as host of Sirasa Lakshapathi, the Sri Lankan version of Who Wants to Be a Millionaire?, from 2011 to 2025, and as Channel Head of Sirasa TV from 2015 to 2025. In February 2025, he was appointed Media Advisor to the President of Sri Lanka.

== Early life and education ==
Sooriyabandara was born in Watapuluwa village, near Kandy. His father, Lionel Sooriyabandara, was a music teacher and sitarist who held a degree from the Heywood Institute of Arts (now part of the University of the Visual and Performing Arts), where he met Sooriyabandara's mother, Sulochana Gamage, also a music student. He is the eldest of four siblings, including his younger brother Saddha Mangala Sooriyabandara, also a journalist and television host.

== Career ==
=== Television hosting ===
In 2011, Sooriyabandara became the second host of Sirasa Lakshapathi, replacing Lucky Dias. He also directed Satana, a weekly political program on Sirasa TV.

=== Media executive roles ===
In 2015, Sooriyabandara was appointed Channel Head of Sirasa TV, part of the Capital Maharaja Group, a position he held until 2025.

In 2018, he was appointed Head of Sirasa Stein Studios, becoming CEO of Stein Studios by 2020. Under his leadership, the studio produced The Voice Sri Lanka (2020,2023), The Voice Teens (2019,2022) and The Voice Kids (2023).

=== Government appointment ===
On 24 February 2025, President Anura Kumara Dissanayake appointed Sooriyabandara as Media Advisor to the President.

== Literary work ==
Sooriyabandara has published books in Sinhala through M.D. Gunasena & Company (Pvt.) Ltd., including Kammeli Mole (කම්මැලි මෝලේ).

== Personal life ==
Sooriyabandara is married to Tharaka Wasalamudaliarachchi (born 1973), a journalist, author, and television announcer. She has published several novels including Dehi (2006), Mati (2007), and Kalu (2009).

The couple has three sons, including Gimhan Sooriyabandara, an Attorney at Law and graduate of the University of Colombo's Faculty of Law.

== Awards and recognition ==
Sooriyabandara received the Executive of the Year Award at the Capital Maharaja Group's 38th Annual Convention for 2014-2015.
