= Nalin Jayawardena =

- Born: Nalin Jayawardena; 18 April 1957 (age 69)
- Origin: Sri Lanka
- Genre: Sri Lankan music
- Occupation: Singer-songwriter
- Years active: 2000–present
- Website: www.sinhalajukebox.org/feature/NalinJayawardena.php

Nalin Jayawardena (Sinhala : නලින් ජයවර්ධන) (born 18 April 1957) is a popular Sri Lankan singer and vocalist. He was the first Sri Lankan singer to release an internet based audio album in Sinhala allowing his fans from around the world to download the album free of charge. This album titled Kanda Paamule was released in 2004.

== Life and career ==
=== Early life ===
Born in Batticaola, in eastern Sri Lanka as the eldest son of Mr Chandra and Mrs MaryAnn Jayawardena, and did his primary studies at Prince of Wales college Moratuwa and at Bandaranayaka college in Gampaha [WP].

=== Career ===
Jayawardena has written several of his own songs and began his music career at a later stage of his life. He has produced over 11 Sinhala audio CD's and several DVD's to entertain his fans.

Jayawardena has released more than 21 CDs including several tribute CDs for the legendary singer HR Jothipala. Nalin Jayawardena has sung over 350 original songs and over 20 videos of his songs are available online. These songs were composed in collaboration with talented sinhala lyric writers such as Dr Vicumpriya Perera who wrote most of Nalin's songs, Sunil Govinnage, Sriya Kumarasingha and Chrishanthi de fonseka. Musical composition for Nalin's songs were done by popular Sri Lankan musicians including Nimal Mendis, Jayanga Dedigama, Dhammika Edusooriya, Multi award winner Visharada Dharashana Wickramathunga, Visharada Sarath Ovitigala, Rohan Jayawardena, Sangeeth Wickramasingha, Ananda Widyasekara and Rukshan Karunanayaka.

Jayawardena is one of the early Sri Lankan artists to release his songs in Google Play, iTunes, and Amazon. In 2016, a lyrics book, "Gee Tharu Mal," containing over 300 songs sung by Nalin Jayawardena was released. Nalin Jayawardena was the recipient of the Multicultural Deshabhimani Award in 2016 of Serendib Publications, Australia.

Jayawardena has also collaborated in the making of the first-ever Dhammapada Stanzas CD packs with Ven Beruwela Siri Sobitha and Dr Gill Fronsdal. He also collaborated in making the charity CD/DVD in the aid of the tsunami victims in Sri Lanka. He also collaborated with Vicumpriya Perera and Bhadraji Mahinda Jayatilaka to produce the first-ever sinhala audio fiction book Kulageyin Kulageyata spanning into five compact discs. This audio book is a production of Lanka Heritage and Sarasavi Publishers, Sri Lanka.

=== Recent events ===
Nalin Jayawardena is currently employed as a building service professional in Australia. He recently released several Sinhala audio compact discs including "My Sister Meenachchi (2018)" and Adare Makaranda (2017). In 2016, a lyrics book, "Gee Tharu Mal," containing over 300 songs sung by Nalin Jayawardena was released. Nalin Jayawardena was the recipient of the Multicultural Deshabhimani Award in 2016 of Serendib Publications, Australia.

== Personal life ==
Jayawardena is married to Renuka Jayawardena (nee Ranasingha) from Galahitiyawa, Ganemulla, Sri Lanka, a medical scientist by profession, and has two daughters. He resides in Perth, Australia.

== Notable songs ==
- Sansara Suwanda – Nalin Jayawardena and Amila Nadeeshani, Music and Melody – Ananda Waidyasekara, Lyrics – Eranga C. Palathiratne.
- Duru Ratawala Api – Nalin Jayawardena and Nilupuli Dilhara, Music and Melody – Ananda Waidyasekara, Lyrics – Krishanthi de Fonseka.
- Maalavika – Nalin Jayawardena, Music and Melody – Rohan Jayawardena, Lyrics – Vicumpriya Perera.
- Paata Paata Samanaliyan – Nalin Jayawardena, Music and Melody – Rukshan Karunanayake backed by Chimes of The 70's, Lyrics – Rukshan Karunanayake.
- Tsunami – Nalin Jayawardena, Melody and English words – Nimal Mendis, Music – Rohan Jayawardena, Sinhala Lyrics – Vicumpriya Perera.
- Midula Puraa – Nalin Jayawardena and Sanduni Rashmika, Music and Melody – Ananda Waidyasekara, Lyrics – Vicumpriya Perera.
- Ven Sobitha himi song Niwan Maga Wediyaa – Nalin Jayawardena, Lyrics - Sameera Premachandra, Music and Melody - Sangeeth Wickramasinghe.
- Wewulai Deetha – Nalin Jayawardena, Lyrics - Susantha Dandeniya, Music and Melody - Dharshana Wickramathunga.
- Bosathuni Wessanthre – Nalin Jayawardena, - Lyrics - Thusith Dandeniya, Music and Melody - Sangeeth Wickramasinghe.
- Visakaweni – Nalin Jayawardena, Lyrics - Vicumpriya Perera, Music and Melody - Sangeeth Wickramasinghe.
- Oba Menehi karana vita - Amma – Nalin Jayawardena, Lyrics - Vicumpriya Perera, Music and Melody - Rohan Jayawardena.
- Ali Kalabalaya – Nalin Jayawardena, Lyrics – Ajantha Jayasekara, Music and Melody - Sangeeth wickramasinghe.
- Sangappuliya mama Henayaa – Nalin Jayawardena, Lyrics - Anaomaji Rajapaksa, Music and Melody - Sangeeth Wickramasinghe.

== List of Audio CDs ==
- Kanda Paamule (2004)
- Anusmarana Upahara – H R Jothipala Tribute (2004)
- Tsunami Audio CD (2005)
- Cold Cold Night – Xmas Single (2005)
- Paata Paata Heenayak (2008)
- Upahaara Sihiwatana (2009)
- Weli Aetayak – Vicumpriya Perera Lyrics 02 (2009)
- Athithawarjanaa – H. R. Jothipala Upahara Gee Pelahara (2010)
- Perth Gamata Paayayi Sandha (2010)
- Paata Paata Samanalayin (2010)
- Oba Soya Ennam (H. R. Jothipala Tribute – Free CD Release)
- Duru Ratawala Api (2011)
- Pilak Wage (2013)
- Pini Wessa Wage (2013)
- Mal Renuwak (2013)
- Sonduru Vasanthaya (2014)
- Vicumpriya Perera Lyrics 07 - Siththaruwanani (2014)
- Suwanda Kekulu (2014)
- Sansara Suwanda (2015)
- Maa Obemayi Sadaa (2015)
- Lankwennata Maa (2016)
- Vicumpriya Perera Lyrics 9 - Ithiri Giyaada Aadare (2016)
- Sundari Nanda (2016)
- Malata Muwarada (2016)
- Tharu Mal (2016)
- Sepalika mal (2016)
- Adare Makaranda (2017)
- My Sister Meenachchi (2018)
