= Nim Him Sewwa (2020 song) =

2020 single by various artists

Single by Bathiya and Santhush, Kasun Kalhara, Sashika Nisansala, Umaria Sinhawansa
- Released: November 28, 2020
- Length: 4:11
- Producer: Maharaja Entertainments

Nim Him Sewwa (Sinhala: නිම් හිම් සෙව්වා) is a 2020 song by Bathiya and Santhush, Kasun Kalhara, Sashika Nisansala, and Umaria Sinhawansa. The song is a collaboration between the five musical artists, made as a promotion for The Voice Sri Lanka, on which the five artists are the judge panel. It is a cover of Pandit W.D. Amaradeva's 1978 hit song of the same name.

This version fuses the Sinhalese and English versions of the song, written by Nimal Mendis for the 1978 Sri Lankan movie Seetha Devi, an adaptation of the Ramayana.

The song was first released on YouTube and sits at 1.09 million views as of October 2023. Since then, Umaria has commonly performed the song at her concerts.
