= Tikiri (disambiguation) =

Tikiri is a village in India. Tikiri may also refer to:

== People ==
- Tikiri Bandara Panabokke I, Ceylonese legislator
- Tikiri Bandara Panabokke II (1883–1963), Ceylonese legislator
- Tikiri Kobbekaduwa, Sri Lankan politician
- Tikiri Banda Subasinghe (1913–1995), Sri Lankan statesman

== Other uses ==
- Tikiri (elephant) (1949–2019), Sri Lankan elephant
- Tikiri (Ceylonese newspaper), Ceylonese newspaper
- Tikiri Suwanda, film
- Ran Tikiri Sina, song
