= Vicumpriya Perera =

Sri Lankan mathematician and lyricist

- Born: 19 February ???? Sri Lanka
- Education: Ananda College, St. Anthony's College, Wattala
- Occupations: lyricist, poet, mathematician

Vicumpriya Perera (Sinhala: විකුම්ප්‍රිය පෙරේරා) is a Sri Lankan born mathematician, lyricist, poet and music producer. He has published three books of Sinhala poetry, Mekunu Satahan (Sinhala: මැකුනු සටහන්) in 2001, Paa Satahan (Sinhala: පා සටහන්) in 2013, and Mawbime Suwandha (Sinhala: මව්බිමේ සුවඳ) in 2023. He has written over 200 songs and has produced eleven Sinhala song albums. He currently works as a mathematics professor in Ohio, US.

== Life and career ==
Vicumpriya Perera is originally from Wattala, Sri Lanka. He is a graduate of St. Anthony's College, Wattala and Ananda College, Maradana, Sri Lanka. He received a Bachelor of Science degree in mathematics with first class honors from University of Colombo, Sri Lanka and continued his graduate studies at Indiana University - Purdue University at Indianapolis. He obtained a doctorate degree from Purdue University in Pure Mathematics with research concentrating on operator algebras and functional analysis in 1993.

Vicumpriya Perera lives in Ohio, US, where he has worked as a mathematics professor at Kent State University (Trumbull campus) since 1998. He works in operator algebra, which is an area of pure mathematics.

Vicumpriya Perera is a past president of the Ohio Mathematical Association of Two year Colleges (OhioMATYC), the Ohio Affiliate organization of the American Mathematical Association of Two Year Colleges (AMATYC). His term of presidency was from 2021 to 2023. He also serves as the immediate past president of the Colombo University Faculty of Science Alumni Association - North America (CUFSAA), since the conclusion of his term as president of the association (2021–2023).

== List of albums ==
The following is a list of the songs albums that Vicumpriya Perera has produced. Vicumpriya Perera was the sole composer of the lyrics of all of them.

Title	Sinhala	Year	No. of songs	Singer(s)	Music directors	Citation(s)
Paa Satahan	පා සටහන්	2008	20	Bhadraji Mahinda Jayatilaka, Praneeth Mash, Sumith Vanniarachchi, and Indeevari Abeywardena.	Bhadraji Mahinda Jayatilaka, Shantha Gunaratne, and Lassana Jayasekara.	
Weli Aetayak	වැලි ඇටයක්	2009	18	Nalin Jayawardena, with duet singers Santhuri Waidyasekera, Sangeeth Wickramasinghe, Ananda Waidyasekera, Nijamali Jayawardena, and Sanduni Rashmika.	Sangeeth Wickramasinghe, Ananda Waidyasekera, Rohan Jayawardena, Rukshan Karunanayake, Jayanga Dedigama and Sanuka Wickramasinghe.	
Ukusu Es	උකුසු ඇස්	2010	18	Bhadraji Mahinda Jayatilaka, Nalin Jayawardena, Chimes of the Seventies, Vidarshana Kodagoda, Dammika Tissarachchi, Isuru Roshan, Anura Dias, Channa and Ravindra Kasturisinghe, Mahesh Fernando, Indeevari Abeywardena, and Praneeth Mash.	Rohan Jayawardena, Sangeeth Wickramasinghe, Ananda Waidyasekera, Rukshan Karunanayake, and Shantha Gunaratne.	
Niwaadu Kale	නිවාඩු කාලේ	2011	16	Sanduni Rashmika, with duet singers Nalin Jayawardena, Santhuri Waidyasekera, and Jayanga Dedigama.	Title song composed by Bhadraji Mahinda Jayatilaka and directed by Sangeeth Wickramasinghe. Other songs directed by Ananda Waidyasekera.	
Viduli Eliyak	විදුලි එලියක්	2012	16	Nilupuli Dilhara, with duet singers Keerthi Pasquel, Nimal Gunasekera, Nalin Jayawardena, and Sanduni Rashmika.	Ananda Waidyasekera. Bhadraji Mahinda Jayatilaka composed music for one song in the album as well.	
Mal Renuwak	මල් රේණුවක්	2013	16	Nalin Jayawardena, with duet singers Amilaa Nadeeshani (second runner-up of Sirasa Superstar season 2 (2007)), Rupa Indumathi, Bhadraji Mahinda Jayatilaka, Walter Fernando, and Thilini Athukorala.	Rohana Weerasinghe, Navaratne Gamage, Sarath De Alwis, H M Jayawardena, Nimal Mendis, Ernest Soysa, Bhadraji Mahinda Jayatilaka, Rohan Jayawardena, Mervin Priyantha, Ananda Waidyasekera, Sangeeth Wickramasinghe and Rukshan Karunanayake.	
Siththaruwanani	සිත්තරුවාණනි	2014	16	Nalin Jayawardena, with duet singer Nimanthi Chamodini (Sri Lankan reality musical show star)	Sangeeth Wickramasinghe	
Indikalaa Pem Medurak	ඉඳිකලා පෙම් මැදුරක්	2015	16	Devananda Waidyasekera, Chandrakumar Kandanarachchi, Thyaga N Edward, Walter Fernando, Ajith Ariyarathna, Nalin Jayawardena, Athula Sri Gamage, Srilal Fonseka, and Praneeth Shiwanka Perera	Ananda Waidyasekera	
Ithiri Giyaada Aadare	ඉතිරී ගියාද ආදරේ	2016	16	Nalin Jayawardena, Rohan Jayawardena, Dhammika Tissaarachchi, Minali Gamage, Amanda Perera, Sangeeth Wickramasinghe and Renuka Wickramasinghe	Rohan Jayawardena, Nimal Mendis, Bhadraji Mahinda Jayatilaka, Ananda Waidyasekera, Sangeeth Wickramasinghe, Rukshan Karunanayake, and Jayanga Dedigama	
Mawbime Suwandha	මව්බිමේ සුවඳ	2018	14	Sangeeth Nipun Professor Sanath Nandasiri, Visharada Edward Jayakody, Anuradha Nandasiri, Dayan Witharana, Swarnalatha Kaveeshwara, Visharada Charitha Priyadarshani Peiris, Visharada Sarath Peiris, Nirasha Ratnayake, Nadeesha Dayaratne, Visharada Harshana Disanayake, and Upendra Piyasena	Visharada Sarath Peiris	
Minpasu Aaye	මින්පසු ආයේ	2020	15	Nalin Jayawardena, Shashika Srimali and Dhammika Edussooriya	Dhammika Edussooriya	

Siththaruwanani included songs from the sinhala classical musical genre (sarala gee). Instrumentalists for this album consisted of Sri Lankan musicians Mahendra Pasquel, Sarath Fernando, Dhananjaya Somasiri, Janaka Bogoda, Susil Amarasinghe, Rohana Dharmakeerthi, Shelton Wijesekera, and Dilusha Ravindranath.

== Other productions ==
In 2005, Vicumpriya Perera (along with Nalin Jayawardena, and Jaanaka Wimaladharma) produced a compact disc set, Dhammapadaya (Sinhala: ධම්මපදය), under the Lanka Heritage label. The set contained four discs, and consisted of complete the Dhammapada stanzas in the original Pali language followed by the Sinhala translations chanted by venerable Beruwala Siri Sobhitha Thero of the Sri Lanka Buddhist Vihara in Perth, Australia. (Note: Dhammapada is a widely read Buddhist scripture containing 423 pali verses spanning into 26 chapters called varga.) In 2006, this disc set had an English release called Dhammapada. This version had the original Dhammapada stanzas (again in Pali) followed by the English translations written and rendered by Dr. Gil Fronsdal, director and resident teacher Insight Meditation Center, Redwood City, California, US.

In 2012 Vicumpriya Perera (in collaboration with Nalin Jayawardena) produced a Sinhala Audiobook called Kulageyin Kulageyata (Sinhala: කුලගෙයින් කුලගෙයට) under the Lanka Heritage, LLC. The book was written in 2009 by Bhadraji Mahinda Jayatilaka, who provided most of the voice work . The audiobook has a total length of five compact discs, and was published by Sarasavi Publishers, Nugegoda, Sri Lanka.
