= The Voice Sri Lanka Season 2 =

The Voice Sri Lanka
- Season 2
- Promotional Poster for Season 2
- Hosted by: Sumiran Dhananjaya Gunasekara
- Coaches: Kasun Kalhara; Bathiya and Santhush (BNS); Sashika Nisansala; Umaria Sinhawansa; Supun Perera _{(Comeback Stage)}
- No. of contestants: 150+
- Winner: Rameesh Sashinka
- Winning coach: Supun Perera
- Runners-up: Chinthaka Roshan; Sheron Silva; Chanupa Deshitha; Shehan Rangana

Release
- Original network: Sirasa TV
- Original release: October 29, 2022 – May 21, 2023

Season chronology
- ← Previous; The Voice Sri Lanka Season 1 Next → The Voice Sri Lanka Season 3

The second season of the Sri Lankan reality talent show The Voice Sri Lanka premiered on 29 October 2022 on Sirasa TV. Sumiran Dhananjaya Gunasekara returned as the main host, presenting all stages of the competition from the Blind Auditions through to the Live Finals.

The main coaching panel featured returning coaches Kasun Kalhara, Bathiya and Santhush (BNS), Sashika Nisansala, and Umaria Sinhawansa. Season 2 also introduced a fifth coach, Supun Perera, who headed The Comeback Stage, a parallel competition offering eliminated artists a route back into the main live competition.

Rameesh Sashinka was crowned the champion on 21 May 2023, securing the first victory for coach Supun Perera. Sashinka made history as the first contestant in the franchise to win the main show after entering via The Comeback Stage.

== Coaches and host ==
Sumiran Dhananjaya Gunasekara served as the sole main host for the entirety of the season, covering the Blind Auditions, Battles, Knockouts, Play-Offs, and Live Shows.

The coaching panel was seated from left to right in the following order:

- Kasun Kalhara (Chair 1) – Vocalist and composer known for his emotional ballads and complex vocal arrangements.
- Bathiya and Santhush (BNS) (Chair 2) – Iconic pop duo blending Sinhala pop with hip-hop and R&B.
- Sashika Nisansala (Chair 3) – Celebrated playback singer and classical vocalist.
- Umaria Sinhawansa (Chair 4) – Powerhouse pop vocalist and winning coach of Season 1.
- Supun Perera (Comeback Stage) – Fifth coach mentoring eliminated artists in a parallel digital side-competition.

== Format changes ==
=== Play-Offs ===
Serving as the final pre-recorded stage prior to the Live Shows, the Play-Offs acted as the final hurdle for the remaining contestants. During this phase, artists delivered individual solo performances, after which each coach made final decisions to assemble their team for the public voting rounds.

The introduction of the Play-Offs during Season 2 marked the first time this format stage was featured in any Asian adaptation of The Voice franchise.

=== The Comeback Stage ===
Season 2 introduced The Comeback Stage, led by coach Supun Perera. This round gave select artists who failed to turn a chair in the Blind Auditions or were eliminated during the Battles and Knockouts a second opportunity to compete and earn a spot back in the main Live Shows.

== Teams ==
Color key

- Winner
- Other Finalist
- Eliminated in the Semi-finals
- Eliminated in the Quarter Finals

Coaches	Top Artists			
Supun Perera (Comeback Stage)	Rameesh Sashinka	Maneesha Wijenayake	Madushan Fernando	Rehan Bogahawatte
Kasun Kalhara	Chanupa Deshitha	Subhash Wasala	Tharindu Sathsara	Sachin Rukshan
Bathiya and Santhush (BNS)	Chinthaka Roshan	Poornima Lakshani	Pramuk Elica	Prabodha Theekshana
Sashika Nisansala	Sheron Silva	Chamilka Gayathri	Visula Madhusara	Sonal Prabhashitha
Umaria Sinhawansa	Shehan Rangana	Renato Motha	Asanka Hettiarachchi	Rebeccah Shalom

== Grand Finale (21 May 2023) ==
The Grand Finale took place live on 21 May 2023. The final four artists performed solo acts and duets with their respective coaches. Rameesh Sashinka was declared the winner following public SMS voting results.

=== Competition performances ===
Artist	Coach	Solo Song	Duet Song (with Coach)	Result
Rameesh Sashinka	Supun Perera	#1 "Handa Mama Udin Yathe"	#6 "Naden"	Winner
Chinthaka Roshan	Kasun Kalhara	#2 "Punchi Doni"	#7 "Ran Kurahan Mala"	Finalist
Sheron Silva	Bathiya and Santhush (BNS)	#3 "Amritha Devi"	#8 "Malsara Heesarin"	Finalist
Chanupa Deshitha	Sashika Nisansala	#4 "Eya Yanna Giya Makila"	#9 "Mal Warusawe"	Finalist
Shehan Rangana	Umaria Sinhawansa	#5 "Iki Gasa Handana"	#10 "Manda Pama"	Finalist

== Reception and viewership ==
Season 2 spanned over 60 episodes and achieved the show's highest mid-season television ratings. The season drew an estimated average viewership of 1.5 million viewers per episode, peaking at 6.2 million viewers during the live finale broadcast.

Season 2 Ratings Overview
Premiere date	Finale date	No. of episodes	Average viewership (Est.)	Finale viewership	Notes
29 October 2022	21 May 2023	60+	1.5 million	6.2 million	Highest mid-season ratings
