= List of songs recorded by Nimal Mendis =

Nimal Mendis is a Sri Lankan singer/songwriters who has won many awards for his music. Mendis recorded 22 songs, eight of them for the Decca Records label in London. He has written songs now regarded as classics in South Asia—including ' Master Sir' about Colonial Ceylon. His songs have been aired over BBC Radio, Premier Radio (UK) and across radio stations in Europe in the 1960s. He appeared on BBC TV's 'Top of the Pops' program with Sandra Edema singing his composition 'Feel Like A Clown.'

"A crusader for creative and original song writing, using the Sri Lankan folk idiom, Nimal Mendis was successful in influencing many a young lyricist and music composer in acknowledging the wealth in Sri Lankan folk music and adapting it with western overtones, to bring about a new identity in music..." (Mahes Perera, writing in the Sunday Observer Sri Lanka)Source: Sunday Observer Sri Lanka

Alphabetical List of Nimal Mendis songs.

== A ==
- Agony & Ecstasy
- Always Asking Why
- And A Star
- And Michael Said
- A Second Chance Mr. Jones

== B ==
- Butterfly In The Rain
- Black Pearl
- Blessed Are The Poor
- Beyond The Sun
- Bread Of Life

== C ==
- Cherry Blossom Tree
- Champagne Blues
- Cold Cold Night
- Compassion
- Cloud 9

== D ==
- Doi Doi Doi
- Diya Manthi Nila
- Dreamlight
- Diyamanthi Adare
- Dance Baila Dance

== E ==
- Eka Mawakage Diyaniyak
- Earth Mother Crying
- End Of A Dream
- Evan Ahlaya

== F ==
- Fisherman's Song
- Felicia
- Fool's Paradise
- Feel Like A Clown
- Follow Me
- Fountains Of Paradise
- Ferryman

== G ==
- Green Diamond
- God King Theme
- Go Go Go
- Ganga Addara (translated into Sinhala by Augustus Vinayagaratnam)
- Garabandal Song
- Ghennu Lamaine
- Girls
- Giri Hisen

== H ==
- Hurt
- Here I Am
- Here And Now

== I ==
- It's What I am

== J ==
- Jivithaye

== K ==
- Kandyan Dance
- Kandyan Express
- Kiss Kiss Kiss

== L ==
- Light Floods In
- Look Into Yourself

== M ==
- Master Sir
- Mage Sihiniya
- Mahaweli
- Master Hand
- Meditate
- Men Of Little Minds

== N ==
- Nim Him

== O ==
- Open Every Door
- Obey Adare
- Oba Mata Kiyai

== P ==
- Puthu Ma Hisay

== R ==
- Ran Tikiri Sina (translated into Sinhala by Augustus Vinayagaratnam)
- Razor Edge

== S ==
- Sri Lanka My Sri Lanka
- Such A Love Is Blind
- Sudu Unnahey

== T ==
- Tsunami Sri Lanka

== U ==
- Upul Nuwan Vidaha

== V ==
- Viyo Gee Gayena Hadhe
