= Rambari =

2009 song by Lahiru Perera

"Rambari" is a Sinhala song composed and sung by Sri Lankan singer Lahiru Perera, who also goes by the stage name "La Signore". The lyrics to the song are by Sri Lankan lyricist Manuranga Wijesekera, who has collaborated with Lahiru on many of his songs. Recorded and released in 2009, the single is still a staple of the Sri Lankan music scene and has been covered and remixed by many artists. It is especially popular at weddings Due to the popularity of the song in Sri Lanka, the music video for Rambari won the title of "Music Video of the Year" at the Derana Music Awards 2010.

== Music video ==
The official music video for Rambari begins with Lahiru's phone ringing while he is shown to be lying on the ground. He picks up the phone only to hear a request for his latest song, Rambari. While he sings the song the video cuts back and forth between several scenes. The video shows him dancing in an upside-down room, and also shows listeners in other locations being transported upwards and dropped at the singer's location to dance with him, and cyclists and break dancers performing bicycle stunts and dancing on the street. The video ends where it began, with Lahiru still dancing while flat on his back. The music video features Maneesha Perera, the daughter of Sri Lankan musician and singer Sunil Perera.

== Interpretations ==
The song's lyrics delve deep into Sri Lankan cuisine, sports culture, weather, travel and transport, and dating and romance.

== Merchandising ==
Lahiru Perera, the singer of Rambari, has released a line of several perfumes under his "La Signore" brand. The fragrance named "Rambari" is a women's perfume with top notes of pink pepper, pear, and red currant, middle notes of peony and jasmine, and base notes of musk, tonka bean, and woody notes.
