= Sirasa Lakshapathi =

Sri Lankan quiz show

- Logo since 2021
- Also known as: Obada Lakshapathi Mamada Lakshapathi
- Sinhala: සිරස ලක්ෂපති
- Genre: Game show
- Based on: Who Wants to Be a Millionaire? by David Briggs; Mike Whitehill; Steven Knight
- Directed by: Samith Rangika Basnayaka (2011–2019)
- Presented by: Lucky Dias (2010–2011); Chandana Suriyabandara (2011–2024); Upul Shantha Sannasgala (2026–present)
- Opening theme: Sirasa Lakshapathi Opening Theme, based on the WWTBAM Opening Theme
- Country of origin: Sri Lanka
- Original language: Sinhala
- No. of seasons: 12
- No. of episodes: 894

Production
- Running time: 60 minutes
- Production company: Capital Maharaja Group

Original release
- Network: Sirasa TV
- Release: 18 September 2010 – present

Related
- Maha Lakshathipathi; Who Wants to Be a Millionaire

Sirasa Lakshapathi (Sinhala: 'සිරස ලක්ෂපති'), formerly titled Obada Lakshapathi Mamada Lakshapathi, is the Sri Lankan version of the original British format of Who Wants to Be a Millionaire? produced in Sri Lanka.

The show premiered on Sirasa TV on September 18, 2010. It was initially hosted by Lucky Dias, then by Chandana Suriyabandara from 2011 to 2024, and by Upul Shantha Sannasgala since 2026.

== History ==
Sirasa Lakshapathi premiered on September 18, 2010, on Sirasa TV, bringing the globally acclaimed Who Wants to Be a Millionaire? format to Sri Lanka's Sinhala-speaking audience. The show was originally titled Obada Lakshapathi Mamada Lakshapathi (You are a millionaire, I am a millionaire).

Initially hosted by veteran actor Lucky Dias, the show's leadership transitioned in 2011 to Chandana Suriyabandara, the Director of Sirasa TV, whose distinctive presentation style became synonymous with the program. On 15 June 2026, Sirasa TV officially announced the return of Sirasa Lakshapathi for its twelfth season, and later confirmed on 27 July 2026 that Upul Shantha Sannasgala would step in as the new host, with the show scheduled to go on air on 1 August 2026. During its decade-plus run, the show has undergone several visual and structural evolutions:

- Production Standards: In 2021, to mark its 10th anniversary, the show introduced a dual-language format where questions and answers are displayed in both Sinhala and English.
- Digital Integration: The show launched the "Mind Click" mobile app and web platform, allowing home viewers to play along in real-time with the studio contestants.
- Longevity: By 2024, the show reached its 11th season, making it the longest-running and most successful game show in Sri Lankan television history.

== Rules of game ==
The game follows the standard international Millionaire format, where a single contestant must answer 15 multiple-choice questions of increasing difficulty to win the top prize.

1. Fastest Finger First: Before reaching the "Hot Seat," ten potential contestants (six from 2021 onwards) must arrange four options in a specific order. The fastest person to do so correctly moves on to play the main game. If there is a tie or if nobody succeeds in the task, the potential contestants shall face a Fastest Finger Second question.
2. The Money Tree: The game is divided into three tiers. Once a contestant correctly answers the 5th and 10th questions, they reach a "Milestone" (Safety Net), guaranteeing they leave with that amount regardless of future incorrect answers.
3. Walking Away: At any point before an answer is locked in, a contestant may choose to "Walk Away" with their current winnings if they are unsure of the answer to the next question.
4. Language: From January 2021 to December 2024, the questions were presented in both Sinhala and English to cater to a wider audience and improve clarity. However, towards the end of the use of bilingual questions, the quality of translations worsened with Sinhala phrases in the question only being transliterated, and therefore it did not return for the twelfth season in 2026.

== Lifelines ==
- Ask the Audience:- If any contestant uses this lifeline, the host will repeat the question to the audience. The studio audience will get 10 seconds to answer the question. Audience members will use touchpads to give the answer what they believe. After the audience will have chosen their choices, their choices will be displayed to the contestant in percentages in bar-graph format and also shown on the monitors screens of the host and contestant, as well as the TV viewers.
- 50:50 (Fifty-fifty):- If the contestant will use this lifeline, the host will ask the computer to remove two wrong answers, chosen randomly. This will remain one right answer and one wrong answer. This will help a contestant giving 50% chance of answering the correct answer.
- Phone A Friend:- If the contestant will use this lifeline, the contestant will be allowed to call one of the three pre-arranged friends, who all have to provide their phone numbers in advance. The host will usually be started off by talking to the contestant's friend and introduces him/her to the viewers. After the introduction, the host will hand the phone call over to the contestant, who then immediately have 30 seconds to ask and hope for a reply from their friend.
- Switch the Question:- Introduced in 2018 (Season 7), this lifeline becomes available only after the contestant successfully reaches the second milestone (Question 10). It allows the contestant to discard the current question and receive a new one of the same difficulty level.

== Money Tree ==
The payout structure was significantly revised on July 10, 2021, to account for economic inflation in Sri Lanka, raising the top prize from Rs. 2 million to Rs. 3 million. Another slight change occurred when the show returned from hiatus in 2026, in which the values of the first six questions were increased, raising the value of the first guaranteed sum slightly, likely to fix a mathematical error in the 2021 money tree between question 2 and question 4.

Payout structure
Question number	Question value		
Question number	18 September 2010 – 6 June 2021	10 July 2021 – 29 December 2024	1 August 2026 - present
15	Rs. 2,000,000	Rs. 3,000,000	
14	Rs. 1,000,000	Rs. 2,000,000	
13	Rs. 500,000	Rs. 1,000,000	
12	Rs. 300,000	Rs. 500,000	
11	Rs. 200,000	Rs. 300,000	
10	Rs. 125,000	Rs. 200,000	
9	Rs. 75,000	Rs. 100,000	
8	Rs. 50,000	Rs. 70,000	
7	Rs. 35,000	Rs. 50,000	
6	Rs. 20,000	Rs. 30,000	Rs. 35,000
5	Rs. 10,000	Rs. 20,000	Rs. 25,000
4	Rs. 5,000	Rs. 10,000	Rs. 20,000
3	Rs. 3,000	Rs. 8,000	Rs. 15,000
2	Rs. 2,000	Rs. 4,000	Rs. 10,000
1	Rs. 1,000	Rs. 2,000	Rs. 5,000
Milestone Top prize

== Winners ==
=== Top Prize Winners ===
- Apeksha Kumari - Rs. 2,000,000 (February 22, 2013)
- Moksha Madusanka - Rs. 2,000,000 (July 2, 2017)
- Hansini Kavindi - Rs. 2,000,000 (December 8, 2018)
- Shukra Munawwar - Rs. 2,000,000 (January 23, 2021)
- Jude Perera - Rs. 3,000,000 (March 19, 2022)

=== Penultimate Prize Winners ===
- Don Rupasiri - Rs. 1,000,000 (October 23, 2010)
- Nuwan Chathuranga - Rs. 1,000,000 (May 26, 2012)
- Srinath Obeysekara - Rs. 1,000,000 (July 25, 2014)
- Uru Warige Wannila Aththo - Rs. 1,000,000 (November 6, 2016)
- Prasastha Kavishath - Rs. 1,000,000 (May 1, 2021)
- Bryan Kingston - Rs. 2,000,000 (October 23, 2021)
- Sasmitha Waidyatilleke - Rs. 2,000,000 (July 29, 2023)
