= Nim Him Sewwa =

1978 Sri Lankan song by W.D. Amaradeva

Song by W.D. Amaradeva
- Released: 1978
- Genre: Indian classical
- Length: 2:40
- Songwriter: Nimal Mendis

"Nim Him Sewwa Ma Sasare" (Sinhala: නිම් හිම් සෙව්වා මා සසරේ; transl. I searched the limits of Samsara), commonly referred to simply as "Nim Him Sewwa", is a Sinhalese-language song by Sri Lankan singer Pandit W. D. Amaradeva. The song first appeared in the 1978 Sri Lankan movie Seetha Devi, an adaptation of the Ramayana. It is the only song in the movie, and has since gained massive popularity.

== History ==
Nim Him Sewwa was written by Nimal Mendis in dedication to his wife, poet Ranjani Mendis. The song was made for the 1978 Sinhalese-language Sri Lankan movie Seetha Devi, an adaptation of the ancient Indian Sanskrit epic known as Ramayana. The film was directed by Manik Sandrasagra, and starred popular Sri Lankan actor Gamini Fonseka, alongside Indian actress Mamata Shankar. It was performed in the movie by Pandit W.D. Amaradeva.

The song has an English version titled "Yesterday, Today or Tomorrow" which was also featured in the film, and sung by Desmond de Silva. The English version was later re-arranged by Diliup Gabadamudalige and sung by Gresha Schuilling. This re-arrangement was released in the United Kingdom under Mendis' company, Media Eye Productions, to notable success

== Cover Versions ==
Both the Sinhalese and English language versions of Nim Him Sewwa have been covered by many artists over the years.

Most notably, in November 2020, the judges of The Voice Sri Lanka (BNS, Umaria, Sashika Nisansala, and Kasun Kalhara) did a collaborative cover of the song to promote the singing competition show, fusing both the Sinhalese and English versions. The video has 1.09 million views on YouTube as of October 2023. Since then, Umaria has commonly performed the song at her concerts.
