= Prema Dadayama =

2016 Sri Lankan television series

- ප්‍රේම දඩයම
- Genre: Supernatural; Drama; Romance; Fantasy
- Based on: Naagin by Ekta Kapoor
- Country of origin: Sri Lanka
- Original language: Sinhala (dubbed)
- No. of seasons: 6

Production
- Executive producer: Ekta Kapoor
- Production company: Balaji Telefilms

Original release
- Network: Sirasa TV
- Release: 4 July 2016 – present

Prema Dadayama (Sinhala:ප්‍රේම දඩයම ; lit. 'Love Hunt') is a Sri Lankan Sinhala-dubbed supernatural fantasy television series broadcast on Sirasa TV. It is the localized adaptation of the Indian Hindi-language television franchise Naagin, produced by Ekta Kapoor and Shobha Kapoor under Balaji Telefilms. The series premiered on 4 July 2016 and became one of the highest-rated dubbed television productions in Sri Lanka.

== Series overview ==
The series revolves around shape-shifting female serpents (known as Icchadhari Nagin) possessing powers to transform into human form. Across successive seasons, the central protagonists seek retribution against human murderers while guarding sacred artifacts, primarily the power-granting gem known as the Naagmani. Each season introduces new central characters, lore expansions, and distinct storylines.

== Plot, cast, and season transitions ==
=== Season 1 ===
- Plot: Shivanya, an Icchadhari Naagin, seeks revenge for the murder of her parents by five human conspirators. She infiltrates the perpetrators' household by marrying Ritik Raheja, the son of one murderer. Her retribution mission is complicated when she genuinely falls in love with Ritik while concealing her secret identity.
- Main Cast: Mouni Roy as Shivanya, Arjun Bijlani as Ritik Raheja, Adaa Khan as Shesha, Sudha Chandran as Yamini Raheja.

=== Season 2 (Prema Dadayama 2) ===
- Plot & Transition: Picking up decades after Season 1, the narrative focuses on Shivangi, the daughter of Shivanya and Ritik. Initially unaware of her serpentine heritage, Shivangi discovers her powers on her 25th birthday following her mother's murder. She marries Rocky Pratap Singh to avenge her mother's death while confronting old enemies who seek the Naagmani.
- Main Cast: Mouni Roy as Shivangi / Shivanya, Karanvir Bohra as Rocky Pratap Singh, Adaa Khan as Shesha / Ruchika, Sudha Chandran as Yamini.

=== Season 3 (Prema Dadayama 3) ===
- Plot & Transition: The narrative transitions to a new generation of serpent royals. Ruhi, a serpent princess, is separated from her lover Vikrant when he is murdered by a group of wealthy youths. Reborn as Bela, she marries Mahir Sehgal—the brother of one murderer—to destroy his family from within, leading to unexpected romantic developments and complex reincarnations.
- Main Cast: Surbhi Jyoti as Bela / Ruhi / Shravani, Pearl V Puri as Mahir Sehgal / Mihir Sippi, Anita Hassanandani as Vishakha, Rajat Tokas as Vikrant.

=== Season 4 (Prema Dadayama 4) ===
- Plot & Transition: Shifting focus to the ancient Lal Tekri temple legacy, Manyata loses her powers and her husband after being targeted by the Parikh family. Years later, Manyata's daughter Brinda enters the Parikh household and marries Dev Parikh to fulfill her mother's revenge, uncovering secrets about her true lineage.
- Main Cast: Nia Sharma as Brinda Parikh, Vijayendra Kumeria as Dev Parikh, Jasmin Bhasin as Nayantara, Sayantani Ghosh as Manyata.

=== Season 5 skip and broadcast order shift ===
In Sri Lanka, Sirasa TV skipped the franchise's fifth season (starring Surbhi Chandna). After concluding Prema Dadayama 4, the channel temporarily rested the franchise before premiering the Indian seventh season first in early 2026. Following the conclusion of Season 7 in September 2026, Sirasa TV transitioned to broadcast the sixth season.

=== Season 7 (Prema Dadayama: A Secret Hidden for Centuries) ===
- Plot & Transition: Resuming under the branding Prema Dadayama - A secret hidden for centuries... (Sinhala: සියවස් ගණනක් සැඟවුණු රහසක්...), the story shifts to Anantha (Radhika), a maiden serpent warrior tasked with guarding her nation against dark supernatural forces. Her journey involves uncovering ancient prophecies alongside Ariyaman while battling mystical adversaries. The season concluded its broadcast on 17 September 2026 with Episode 123.
- Main Cast: Kanika Mann / Priyanka Chahar Choudhary as Anantha / Radhika, along with Sirasa TV voice-dubbing artists.

=== Season 6 (Prema Dadayama: The New Arrival of the Serpent Legacy) ===
- Plot & Transition: On 17 September 2026, Sirasa TV released promotional trailers announcing the premiere of Naagin 6 under the localized title Prema Dadayama – The New Arrival of the Serpent Legacy (Sinhala: නාග උරුමයේ නව ආගමනය). The series commenced airing on 18 September 2026. The plot follows Pratha, a *Sarvashreshtha Shesh Naagin*, who undertakes a mission to save the nation from a biological outbreak and conspiracy orchestrated by traitorous enemies, marrying military officer Rishabh Gujral in the process. The later narrative continues with her daughter, Prarthna, defending the serpent realm.
- Main Cast: Tejasswi Prakash as Pratha Gujral / Prarthna, Simba Nagpal as Rishabh Gujral, Mahek Chahal as Mahek, Sudha Chandran as Seema Gujral, Urvashi Dholakia as Urvashi Kataria.

== Broadcast history ==
The series originally debuted on Sirasa TV on 4 July 2016 in a weeknight prime-time slot. The sequel Prema Dadayama 2 launched on 25 March 2017. Subsequent installments Prema Dadayama 3 and Prema Dadayama 4 followed in 2018 and 2020 respectively. After skipping season 5, Sirasa TV aired season 7 under the subtitle Prema Dadayama - A secret hidden for centuries... in 2026, which ran for 123 episodes and concluded on 17 September 2026. The network officially announced season 6 on 17 September 2026 and began broadcasting Prema Dadayama – The New Arrival of the Serpent Legacy on 18 September 2026.

== Soundtrack ==
The Sinhala-language theme songs and musical scores for Prema Dadayama were commissioned by Sirasa TV for its Sri Lankan broadcast. Music director Ashan Fernando composed the original themes for the local release, featuring lyrics by Sydney Chandrasekara. For both the seventh season and the subsequent sixth season broadcast, the show re-introduced a modernized remix of its original theme song, "Udu Sulange", performed by Pradeep Rangana.

Season	Song Title	Vocals	Music	Lyrics	Notes
Season 1 (Prema Dadayama)	"Udu Sulange" (උඩු සුළඟේ)	Pradeep Rangana	Ashan Fernando	Sydney Chandrasekara	Original main theme song.
Season 2 (Prema Dadayama 2)	"Paya Payala" (පායා පායාලා)	Olu Wasanthi, Ashan Fernando	Ashan Fernando	Sydney Chandrasekara	Main theme for Season 2.
Season 3 (Prema Dadayama 3)	"Sara Sandata Hangi" (සරා සඳට හැංගී)	Olu Wasanthi, Ashan Fernando	Ashan Fernando	Sydney Chandrasekara	Darker synth-orientated vocal and orchestral track.
Season 4 (Prema Dadayama 4)	"Laya Gambure Awilenne" (ලය ගැඹුරේ ඇවිලෙන්නේ )	Ashan Fernando	Ashan Fernando	Nisal Fernando	Vocal and orchestral arrangement.
Season 7 (Prema Dadayama - A secret hidden for centuries...)	"Udu Sulange" (Remix / Return)	Pradeep Rangana	Ashan Fernando	Sydney Chandrasekara	Modernized remix of the Season 1 theme song.
Season 6 (Prema Dadayama – The New Arrival of the Serpent Legacy)	"Udu Sulange" (Remix / Return)	Pradeep Rangana	Ashan Fernando	Sydney Chandrasekara	Reused modernized remix of the Season 1 theme song.

== Reception ==
- Prema Dadayama remains one of the most successful localized dubbing ventures in Sri Lankan television history. Media reporting highlighted significant viewer engagement across both terrestrial broadcasts and official digital streaming channels.
