= Pradeep Rangana =

Pradeep Rangana ප්‍රදීප් රංගන
- Born: Pradeep Rangana Abesinghe; 12 November 1983 (age 42); Ratnapura, Sri Lanka
- Genres: pop, soul blues
- Occupations: Physician, singer-songwriter
- Instruments: Vocals, guitar
- Years active: 2007–present
- Label: M Entertainment

Pradeep Rangana (ප්‍රදීප් රංගන) (born 12 November 1983), is a Sri Lankan medical doctor, singer, and songwriter. He was the winner in the second season of Sirasa Superstar. He currently works as a doctor in Marathenna Regional Hospital, Balangoda.

== Early life and background ==
Rangana was born on 12 November 1983 in Weralupe, Rathnapura. His father, Y.M. Abeysinghe, taught him to sing and whistle, and arranged music events in their home when Rangana and his two sisters were growing up. He studied at St. Thomas's College, Bandarawela, before being accepted to medical school at the University of Ruhuna.

In his third year of medical school, Rangana auditioned for the second season of Sirasa Superstar, and was selected to participate in the talent competition. On 31 October 2007, he won the final round held at Sugathadasa Stadium.

== Marriage ==
Pradeep married his long-time partner, Chathurika Prasadini, on 2 August 2015.

== Career ==
After being named Superstar, Pradeep recorded and released his first album, Aadambarakari. The official DVD launch was held on 31 March 2009 at R.Premadasa Stadium, timed to the start of Sirasa Superstar's third season.

Pradeep wrote his first song (for his father) when he was eight. He wrote 12 songs before he appeared on Sirasa Superstar. That same year, Pradeep sang at some of St. Thomas's College functions.

In 2014, Pradeep's song "Pem Sihine" won the Most Popular Music Video award at the Derana Music Video Awards. He followed that up in March 2016 with the single "Pem Sihine 2 - Mayawi".

Pradeep posts whistling covers of his songs and other artists songs on social media, showing his skill while still focusing on singing. He also coaches and helps the 2024 winner of the Sri Lankan version of The Voice Kids, Thuwan Aslam Roshan, with Roshan's own whistling. Pradeep was a judge on the show, when Roshan was one of the contestants who chose to be coached by him.

On 8 April 2008, the Pradeep and Friends in Concert was held at Bandaranaike Memorial International Conference Hall (BMICH). It was organized by the Ruhuna Medical School Alumni Association (RUMSAA) to help Ruhuna Medical Faculty. On 1 June 2008, Rangana performed with other season two finalists at the Sugathadasa Indoor Stadium to support the Help Samitha Fund; Samitha Samanmali was a medical student who suffered from a severe spinal cord injury.

=== Television shows ===
| Year | Title | Channel | Language | Role |
|---|---|---|---|---|
| 2017-18 | Sirasa Junior Super Star | Sirasa TV | Sinhala | Judge -Himself |
| 2023-24 | The Voice Kids(Season - 1) | Sirasa TV | Sinhala | Coach -Himself |

== Albums ==
| Aadambarakari | 2009 |

== Track listing ==
Adambarakari album included songs
| No. | Title | Length |
|---|---|---|
| 1. | "Adambarakari" (Album Version) | 05.12 |
| 2. | "Mal pipena isawwata" | 04.01 |
| 3. | "Mal warusawe" (Album Version) | 04.38 |
| 4. | "Paana wage pena heene" (First song) | 04.15 |
| 5. | "Sihina paaye manamali" (Album Version) | 03.58 |
| 6. | "Hade pipuna" (Album Version) | 03.22 |
| 7. | "Heena matha adena" (Album Version) | 04.41 |
| 8. | "Hagumbara novi" (Album Version) | 04.41 |
| 9. | "Wasanthaye kumari" (Album Version) | 03.57 |
| 10. | "Hiru hinahi" (Album Version) | 04.05 |
| 11. | "Nilambare" (Album Version) | 04.08 |
| 12. | "Sanda tharam" (Album Version) | 02.56 |

== Single song tracks released ==
Solo Tracks
| No. | Title | Length |
|---|---|---|
| 1. | "Nada Inna Dan" (Solo Track Version) | 04.15 |
| 2. | "Oya As Diha Balan" (Solo Track Version) | 04.43 |
| 3. | "Ra Nilambare" (Solo Track Version) | 04.02 |
| 4. | "Ridee Sandawathi" (Solo Track Version) | 03.21 |
| 5. | "Ahasa Haduwa ( Duet with female singer Uresha Ravihari in Uththara Film )" (Solo Track Version) | 04.49 |
| 6. | "Pini Pokuru Walapena Yame ( Uththara Film )" (Solo Track Version) |
| 7. | "Obe Namata Pudami Sada ( two versions as radio and television versions )" (Radio Track Version) | 04.45 |
| 8. | "Adare Oben Danunu Tharam" (Solo Track Version) | 04.20 |
| 9. | "Pem sihine" (Solo Track Version) | 03.59 |
| 10. | "Mayawi (Pem sihine 2)" (Solo Track Version) | 03.40 |
| 11. | "Udu Sulange (Prema Dadayama drama song)" (Solo Track Version) | 03.50 |
| 12. | "Ridee Vihare (Hiru Shakyasinghe Mangalyaya Theme Song - 2017)" (Solo Track Version) | 04.02 |
| 13. | "Maha Wassa" (Solo Track Version) | 03.58 |
| 14. | "Akashaye Wahi Andura ( Duet with female singer Shanika Madumali in Udumbara Film )" (Solo Track Version) |
| 15. | "Samanala Sirasin Pinbara ( Duet with female singer Shanika Madumali in Udumbara Film )" (Solo Track Version) |
