= Sacred Heart Convent, Galle =

Sacred Heart Convent Galle
- Sri Hardaya Kanyaaramaya ශ්‍රී හෘදය කන්‍යාරාමය

Location
- Templers Road; Galle; Sri Lanka; 6°2′11.76″N 80°12′39.7″E

Information
- Type: Government Public School
- Motto: Latin: Cor Unum Anima Una : One Heart One Soul
- Established: 1896; 130 years ago
- Founder: Five sisters of Charity
- Principal: Sandya Rani Fernando
- Grades: Primary to G.C.E. Advanced Level
- Gender: Girls
- Colours: Red and gold
- Website: http://www.sacredheartconvent.lk/

Sacred Heart Convent is a girls' school in Galle, Sri Lanka. The school was established in 1896 by the Sisters of Charity in Belgium due to a perceived need to provide a European education for young girls in Galle. Today, the Sacred Heart Convent has over 2,200 students and 83 teachers. The present principal of the school is Sandya Rani Fernando.
