= Lahiru Perera =

Sri Lankan Musician (born 1984)

- Born: Lahiru Perera; 18 April 1984 (age 42); Sri Lanka
- Other name: La Signore
- Education: D. S. Senanayake College; APITT Sri Lanka; SAE Institute Singapore
- Occupations: Singer; Musician; Music Producer
- Years active: 2008–present
- Known for: Rambari
- Spouse: Neepama Keerthiratne

Lahiru Perera (Sinhala: ලහිරු පෙරේරා ; born 18 April 1984), also known by his stage name La Signore, is a Sri Lankan singer, musician and music producer. Perera became known with his 2008 breakthrough hit single "Rambari". He was born and raised in Kehelbaddara, Udugampola.

His latest ventures include a perfume line named La Signore The Fragrance perfumes and colognes.

== Single song tracks released ==
Solo Tracks
| No. | Title | Length |
|---|---|---|
| 1. | "Manbandu Hadarandu" (Solo Track Version) | 04.49 |
| 2. | "Rambari" (Solo Track Version) | 04.30 |
| 3. | "Prima Koththu Mee Song" (Remade Rambari version for the Prima commercial) | 4.09 |
| 4. | "Sudu gawuma - ft. Nathasha Perera" (Solo Track Version) | 03.49 |
| 5. | "Labandiye" (Solo Track Version) | 03.35 |
| 6. | "Paaren(Production for a film-Roopantharana)" (Solo Track Version) | 02.51 |
| 7. | "Rathu Ratakaju" (Solo Track Version) | 04.40 |
| 8. | "Desin Pe" (Solo Track Version) | 02.52 |
| 9. | "Ama Teledrama Theme Song" (Solo Track Version) | 02.57 |
| 10. | "Akka" (Solo Track Version) |
| 11. | "Mottu (Mathale Haduwa Mama Ge Thattu)" (Solo Track Version) | 03.11 |
| 12. | "Hawasaka ma" (Solo Track Version) | 03.05 |
| 13. | "Kessata Kos Ata" (Solo Track Version) | 03.31 |
| 14. | "Salli" (Solo Track Version) | 03.42 |
| 15. | "Rambari 2 remix(Produced for Derana Music Video awards)" (Solo Track Version - ft. Saranga Disasekera) | 03.00 |
| 16. | "Mata rawana" (Solo Track Version - 2016) | 03.57 |
| 17. | "China Tawuma" (Solo Track Version - 2017) |

== Television shows ==
| Year | Title | Channel | Language | Role |
|---|---|---|---|---|
| 2022 | The Voice Teens - Sri Lanka(Season - 2) | Sirasa TV | Sinhala | Coach -Himself |
| 2023 | Derana 60 Plus(Season - 5) | TV Derana | Sinhala | Judge -Himself |
