= Master Sir =

"මාස්ටර් සර්"

Single by Nimal Mendis

from the album Master Sir from the movie Kalu Diya Dahara
- Language: Sinhala
- English title: Master Sir
- Released: 25 November 1975
- Recorded: 1974
- Studio: SLBC
- Venue: COLOMBO 7
- Genre: Ballad
- Length: -
- Label: -
- Songwriters: Nimal Mendis (Music, Sinhala and English lyrics); Karunaratne Abeysekera (Sinhala lyrics)
- Producer: Nimal Mendis

"Master Sir" (Sinhala: මාස්ටර් සර්) is a Sinhala pop song written by Sri Lankan singer/songwriter Nimal Mendis for the film Kalu Diya Dhahara ("A column of black water"), in which it was performed over the title sequence by Neela Wickramasinghe.

== History ==
First played in the early 1970s on Radio Ceylon, the oldest radio station in South Asia, the song was recorded both in English (by Mendis and Sandra Edema) and Sinhala (by Neville Fernando of Los Caballeros; lyrics translated to Sinhala by Karunaratne Abeysekera), with both versions released on the Lotus label and distributed by Lotus Entertainment. It has remained a hit in Sri Lanka for over thirty years, mostly as a result of Neela Wickramasinghe's later version based on the 4/4 time signature arrangement and riffs of the original English version. An authorized cover of the song was performed live and recorded by popular Sri Lankan duo Bathiya and Santhush. It has been covered by several other Sri Lankan musicians, and still receives extensive airplay on the Sri Lanka Broadcasting Corporation and other commercial radio stations in Colombo.

The song reached new audiences in London when the Sri Lankan broadcaster Vernon Corea featured it on his BBC Radio London program, London Sounds Eastern.

== Composition ==
"Master Sir" is set to a 4/4 time signature, and is in the key of D Major. It utilises the I, IV, ii, iii, vi, and V chords. It has a simple Verse–chorus form, featuring an intro, first verse, chorus, second verse, and ending with a repeated chorus featuring an outro.

The ballad is set in colonial Sri Lanka; the lyrics tell a story about the dignity of labour and social justice. The lyrics of the first verse speak of how the last salary increment of 8 Panam is enough to feed the protagonist's child with some rice, but it is still less than what he deserves; and asking "Master Sir" to have mercy on him. The second verse covers how the Colonial masters used to carry out Corporal punishment on the workers, and how they would be kneeling and shivering in fear when conversing with the master. The chorus takes a more hopeful tone, exploring the Tug of war between master and servant, and whether it will end one day and the two will become friends. The protagonist expresses a wishful hope that such a day will come.

== Recording ==
The recordings for Master Sir took place at Wijaya Studio in Hendala, Wattala in 1974. Nimal Mendis was the music director for the film Kalu Diya Dahara and wrote Master Sir initially in English. It was translated to Sinhala by Karunaratne Abeysekera. The vocalist for the performance was Neville Fernando, who was suffering from leukaemia at the time. Although undergoing cancer treatment and in immense pain, he was able to perform vocals on the track. Leaving the recording on a sombre tone, he turned to Mendis and Abeysekera and remarked that he might not be alive to see the release of the film. He died from leukaemia on 23 April 1975 at the age of 38.
