= Ran Tikiri Sina =

Single by Nirasha Perera & Victor Silva
- Released: 1979
- Genre: Sri Lankan music
- Songwriter: Nimal Mendis

Ran Tikiri Sina (Sinhala, "Golden Smile") is a song written by Nimal Mendis and translated into Sinhala by Augustus Vinayagaratnam. It was originally performed by Nirasha Perera and Victor Silva for the Sri Lankan film Ganga Addara.

== Composition ==
Nimal Mendis wrote the song for Sumitra Peries' film 'Ganga Addara' . Mendis composed the lyrics in English and thereafter Augustus Vinayagaratnam translated the lyrics into Sinhala. It was sung in the film by Victor Silva and Nirasha Perera. The film was directed by Sumitra Peries and produced by Sumathi Films which was highly acclaimed. The song became a hit and was recorded by Neela Wickramasinghe and T.M Jayaratne which became a highly successful cover version.

== Background ==
The song was recorded in 1979 at the Joe-Neth studio and arranged by Sarath Fernando. Nirasha Perera was joined by children from the Sangamitta Balika Vidyalaya, Borella on the chorus.
