= Sinasuna Adaren =

Sinasuna Adaren සිනාසුනා ආදරෙන්
- Directed by: Eranga Senaratne
- Written by: Lakshman Pushpakumar
- Produced by: Vidun Cinema Entertainment
- Starring: Chathurika Peiris; Pradeep Dharmadasa; Buddhika Jayaratne
- Cinematography: Lalith M. Thomas
- Edited by: Stanley de Alwis
- Music by: Priyanjith Wijesekara
- Distributed by: LFD Theatres
- Release date: 17 April 2009
- Country: Sri Lanka
- Language: Sinhala

Sinasuna Adaren (Smiled Lovingly) (Sinhala: සිනාසුණා ආදරෙන්) is a 2009 Sri Lankan Sinhala romantic drama film directed by Eranga Senaratne and co-produced by Neranjan Keerthiratne and Chandani Keerthiratne for Vidun Cinema Entertainment. It stars Chathurika Peiris, Pradeep Dharmadasa and Buddhika Jayaratne in lead roles along with Dilhani Ekanayake and Rodney Warnakula. Music composed by Priyanjith Wijesekara. It is the 1123rd Sri Lankan film in the Sinhala cinema.

== Cast ==
- Chathurika Peiris as Vihangi
- Pradeep Dharmadasa as Milan
- Buddhika Jayaratne as Thiwanka
- Dilhani Ekanayake as Mrs. Karandeniya
- Sriyantha Mendis as Bhathiya Karandeniya
- Rodney Warnakula as Lara
- Sanjeewa Mallawarachchi as Subramanium

== Songs ==
No.	Title	Singer(s)	Length
1.	"Nil Nuwan Pathu Sema"	Abhisheka Wimalaweera
2.	"Walakulak Ath Math Karala"	Uresha Ravihari
3.	"Mal Devata Dige"	Uresha Ravihari, Gracian Ananda
4.	"Sanda Mage Obai"	Uresha Ravihari, Gracian Ananda
5.	"Epa Sande Rashi"	Uresha Ravihari, Gracian Ananda
