= The Voice Teens (Sri Lankan TV series) =

Sri Lankan singing talent show

- Also known as: The Voice Teens Sri Lanka
- Genre: Reality
- Created by: John de Mol Jr.
- Based on: The Voice franchise
- Directed by: Samith Rangika Basnayaka
- Presented by: Stephanie Siriwardhana (Season 1 & 2); Julia Sonali (Season 3)
- Judges: Sanuka Wickremasinghe; Ashanthi De Alwis; Dumal Warnakulasuriya; Raini Charuka; Sanka Dineth; Abhisheka Wimalaweera; Lahiru Perera (La Signore); Yohani De Silva; Yasas Medagedara
- Composer: Asela Bandara
- Country of origin: Sri Lanka
- Original language: Sinhala
- No. of seasons: 3
- No. of episodes: 200–300

Production
- Producer: Waruna Karunarathna
- Production locations: Ratmalana, Sri Lanka - Stein Studios
- Animators: Mahinda Nagahawatta; Lahiru Hashan; Chamath Gunasekara
- Editors: Lalith Wasantha, Pubudu Wanigasekara
- Camera setup: Multi-camera
- Running time: 1 hour and 30 minutes
- Production companies: Stein Studios; MTV/MBC; ITV Studios

Original release
- Network: Sirasa TV
- Release: 7 February 2020 – present

Related
- The Voice Sri Lanka; The Voice Kids

The Voice Teens is a singing reality talent program for teenagers in Sri Lanka. It is a spin-off of John de Mol Jr.'s Dutch reality singing competition The Voice; unlike the adult original, this version is geared toward teenagers and is part of a larger international franchise.

The artists' performances are critiqued by a panel of four coaches, who then lead their teams of selected artists through the rest of the season. They also compete to guarantee that their act takes first place in the competition, earning them the winning coach. Dumal Warnakulasuriya, Raini Charuka, Ashanthi De Alwis, and Sanuka Wickremasinghe were on the first panel; Raini Charuka, Abhisheka Wimalaweera, Sanka Dineth and Lahiru Perera were on the second panel. The third season originally featured returning coaches Sanka Dineth and Abhisheka Wimalaweera alongside new coaches Yohani and Yasas Medagedara. However, Abhisheka withdrew from the panel after the blind auditions, leading to Raini replacing her for the rest of the season.

The show first aired on 8 February 2020 on Sirasa TV and concluded its second season on July 3, 2022. It has produced two winners: Hashen Dulanjana and Panirsha Thiyagaraja. The third season premiered on 21 March 2026.

== Overview ==
=== Format ===
The Voice Teens is a reality television show that is a spin-off of The Voice, which first broadcast in the Netherlands and was adapted in Colombia as La Voz Teens. Four coaches or judges look for a group of gifted individuals who could become Sri Lanka's next teenage singing sensation. The title of the show hints at the concept: the four coaches will judge a singer hopeful dubbed "Artist" solely on his or her vocal ability, regardless of physical appearance.

=== The blind auditions ===
The blind auditions are the first stage, in which the four coaches, all well-known recording artists, listen to the contestants while sitting in seats facing away from the stage. If a coach loves what they hear from a contestant, they hit the "I Want You" button, which causes their chairs to rotate. When each coach has a certain number of contestants to work with, the blind auditions end.

=== The battle rounds ===
The contestants that pass the blind auditions advance to the battle rounds, when the coaches pit two of their own team members against one other in front of a studio audience to perform the same song together. After the verbal duel, the coach chooses just one person to continue to the knockout round.

=== The knockout rounds ===
Each of the surviving artists compete in the knockout round for a spot in the Live Shows phase. On Season 2, the knockout rounds were slightly altered, with seven people performing and four chairs being assigned based on their performance thus far.

=== The live shows ===
The top contenders from each team compete against each other in a live show during the competition's final performance phase. The television audience votes to retain one person from each team, leaving the coach to select who will move on. Finally, each coach has one last competitor in the finals, where "The Voice" is crowned and earns a cash award.

== Development ==
The Voice Teens fills the age gap of the two earlier versions of The Voice franchise, wherein the age requirement is limited from ages 13 to 17. Sri Lanka is the third country in the world to adapt The Voice Teens franchise after its success in Colombia and the Philippines.

== Coaches and hosts ==
Coach	Seasons		
Coach	1	2	3
Sanuka Wickremasinghe			
Ashanthi De Alwis			
Dumal Warnakulasuriya			
Raini Charuka Goonatillake			Battles onwards
Lahiru Perera			
Abhisheka Wimalaweera			Blind Auditions
Sanka Dineth			
Yasas Medagedara			
Yohani			

It was confirmed by Sirasa TV that Raini Charuka, Sanuka Wickremasinghe, Ashanthi De Alwis and Dumal Warnakulasuriya were the first season's coaches. For the 2nd season, Raini returned with Sanka Dineth, Lahiru Perera and Abhisheka Wimalaweera.

For the 3rd season (2026), the panel originally consisted of Sanka Dineth, Yohani, Abhisheka Wimalaweera, and Yasas Medagedara. However, Raini replaced Abhisheka after the blind auditions after Abhisheka withdrew from the panel due to personal reasons.The first two seasons were hosted by Stephanie Siriwardhana, while the third season is hosted by Julia Sonali.

== Season summary ==
Artist's info

Team Sanuka
Team Ashanthi
Team Dumal
Team Raini

Team Lahiru
Team Abhisheka
Team Sanka
Team Yohani
Team Yasas

Season	First aired	Last aired	Winner	Other finalists							Winning Coach	Main Host	Digital Host	coaches' chair order from (Right to Left on screen)			
Season	First aired	Last aired	Winner	Other finalists							Winning Coach	Main Host	Digital Host	1	2	3	4
1	Feb 7, 2020	Aug 9, 2020	Hashen Dulanjana	Madhuvy Vaithialingam	Ishitha Premnath	Erandi Hashani	Shemil Clinson	Amelia WIjesooriya	Adithya Weliwatta	Hesara Bandara	Sanuka Wickremasinghe	Stephanie Siriwardhana	—	Sanuka	Ashanthi	Dumal	Raini
2	Jan 29, 2022	Jul 3, 2022	Pranirsha Thiyagaraja	Sasindu Raveen	Navodya Perera	Rasaal Theminda	—N/a				Abhisheka Wimalaweera	Stephanie Siriwardhana	Julia Sonali	Lahiru	Abhisheka	Raini	Sanka
3	Mar 21, 2026	Sep 27, 2026	Janiru Kavinda	Seniru Dilmith	Shrinath Pathum	Thasindu Nimesh	—N/a				Sanka Dineth	Julia Sonali	Celeena Croos	Yasas	Raini (Note: Raini Charuka replaced Abhisheka Wimalaweera from the battles onward, following Wimalaweera's withdrawal from the panel due to personal reasons after the blind auditions.)	Yohani	Sanka

=== Teams ===
Contestant placing

- Winner
- Runner-up

Winners are in bold, finalists are in small italic font.

Season	Coaches and their finalists				Ref.
1	Raini Charuka	Sanuka Wickremasinghe	Dumal Warnakulasuriya	Ashanthi De Alwis	
1	Ishitha Premnath; Amelia Wijesooriya	**Hashen Dulanjana**; Hesara Bandara	Erandi Hashani; Adithya Weliwatta	Madhuvy Vaithialingam; Shemil Clinson	
2	Lahiru Perera	Abhisheka Wimalaweera	Raini Charuka	Sanka Dineth	
2	Sasindu Raveen	**Pranisha Thiyagaraja**	Rasaal Theminda	Navodya Perera	
3	Yasas Medagedara	Raini Charuka	Yohani	Sanka Dineth	
3	Seniru Dilmith	Shrinath Pathum	Thasindu Nimesh	**Janiru Kavinda**	

== Coaches' results ==
Considering the final placement of the contestants who are members of their team (not the final placement of the coaches):

Coaches' results
Coach	Winner	Runner-up	Third place	Fourth place
Sanuka Wickremasinghe	1 time (1)	—N/a	—N/a	—N/a
Abhisheka Wimalaweera	1 time (2)	—N/a	—N/a	—N/a
Sanka Dineth	1 time (3)	—N/a	1 time (2)	—N/a
Raini Charuka	—N/a	1 time (3)	1 time (1)	1 time (2)
Ashanthi de Alwis	—N/a	1 time (1)	—N/a	—N/a
Lahiru Perera	—N/a	1 time (2)	—N/a	—N/a
Dumal Warnakulasuriya	—N/a	—N/a	—N/a	1 time (1)
Yasas Medagedara	—N/a	—N/a	1 time (3)	—N/a
Yohani	—N/a	—N/a	—N/a	1 time (3)

== Related versions ==
=== The Voice Sri Lanka ===
The Voice Sri Lanka is the flagship adult version of the global franchise in Sri Lanka. It premiered on Sirasa TV in November 2020 and is open to contestants aged 18 and older. The inaugural season was won by Harith Wijeratne from Team Umaria. The second season was won by Rameesh Shashinka (Ramiya), and the third season was won by Imesh Sandeepa, both representing Team Supun.

=== The Voice Kids Sri Lanka ===
The Voice Kids is the children's version of The Voice in Sri Lanka. It was introduced on Sirasa TV in 2023 as another age-specific version of the franchise, following The Voice Teens and The Voice Sri Lanka.
