= The Voice Kids (Sri Lankan TV series) =

Sri Lankan singing competition series

- Genre: Reality television; Singing competition
- Based on: The Voice franchise by John de Mol Jr.
- Directed by: Samith Rangika Basnayaka
- Presented by: Nathasha Perera
- Judges: Harshana Dissanayake; Nadini Premadasa; Pradeep Rangana; Uresha Ravihari
- Composer: Asela Bandara
- Country of origin: Sri Lanka
- Original language: Sinhala
- No. of seasons: 1

Production
- Producer: Waruna Karunarathna
- Production locations: Ratmalana, Sri Lanka - Stein Studios
- Animators: Mahinda Nagahawatta; Lahiru Hashan; Chamath Gunasekara
- Editors: Lalith Wasantha, Pubudu Wanigasekara
- Camera setup: Multi-camera
- Running time: 1 hour and 30 minutes
- Production companies: Stein Studios; MTV/MBC; ITV Studios

Original release
- Network: Sirasa TV
- Release: 23 September 2023 – present

Related
- The Voice Sri Lanka; The Voice Teens

The Voice Kids is a singing competition reality television program from Sri Lanka, broadcast on Sirasa TV. It premiered on 23 September 2023, and is currently airing its first season. The series is based on the original Dutch singing competition, The Voice of Holland, created by media tycoon John de Mol Jr., and part of a larger international franchise.

Contestants are selected by a panel of four judges (known as "coaches") who are facing away from the contestants, allowing them to judge the singers based solely on their voice. If the coach wants the performing contestant on their team, they press a button which turns their chair, revealing to them what the singer looks like. If more than one coach turns their chair, the contestant is allowed to choose which coach's team they would like to join.The four coaches on the first and only season thus far are Harshana Dissanayake, Nadini Premadasa, Pradeep Rangana, and Uresha Ravihari. The coaches are all famed recording artists who guide their team through different stages of the competition. The show is hosted by Nathasha Perera.

The show follows two predecessors, The Voice Teens and The Voice Sri Lanka, both of which garnered massive fame in the country. The show first premiered on 23 September 2023 and broadcast its first season through 20 April 2024. The winner is determined by television viewers voting via SMS.

Aslam Roshan age 13 from Kandy was awarded the winner of the 1st Voice Kids by the popular SMS vote.

== Overview ==
The Voice is a reality television singing competition show that is a spin-off of The Voice, which first broadcast in the Netherlands. The title of the show hints at the concept: the four coaches will judge a singer hopeful dubbed "Artist" solely on his or her vocal ability, regardless of physical appearance. Contestants are selected by a panel of five judges (known as "coaches") who are facing away from the contestants, allowing them to judge the singers based solely on their voice. If the coach wants the performing contestant on their team, they press a button which turns their chair, revealing to them what the singer looks like. If more than one coach turns their chair, the contestant is allowed to choose which coach's team they would like to join. Contestants must be under 13 to join, as opposed to the Teens version which is for 13–18, and the regular version which is for 18+.

=== Blind Auditions ===
The blind auditions are the first stage, in which the five coaches, all well-known recording artists, listen to the contestants while sitting in seats facing away from the stage. If a coach likes what they hear from a contestant, they hit the "I Want You" button, which causes their chairs to rotate, indicating that they want to work with that contestant. If more than one coach hits their button, the contender chooses the coach with whom he or she wishes to work. When each coach has a certain amount of contestants to work with, the blind auditions end. Coaches devote themselves to helping their vocalists grow psychologically, musically, and physically, as well as providing advice and sharing their secrets of success.

The contest is currently in this stage, so not much is known about the upcoming stages. If it is to be inferred that it will be the same as other Voice formats, it will be followed by the battle rounds, knockouts, live shows, and then the grand finale.

== Development ==
Following the success of The Voice Teens and The Voice Sri Lanka, Sirasa TV announced that The Voice Kids will also be coming to Sri Lanka on 19 September 2023.

== Coaches and host ==
=== Coaches ===
It was confirmed by Sirasa TV on 16 September 2023 via series of videos posted to Instagram and YouTube that Harshana Dissanayake, Nadini Premadasa, Pradeep Rangana and Uresha Ravihari would be the coaches for The Voice Kids Sri Lanka.

=== Host ===
It was revealed in a video posted to the Voice Sri Lanka YouTube channel that the host for The Voice Kids Sri Lanka would be musical artist Natasha Perera.

== Series Summary ==
Artist's info

Team Harshana
Team Nadini
Team Pradeep
Team Uresha

Season	First aired	Last aired	Winner	Finalists				Winning Coach	Main Host	Coaches (chairs' order)			
Season	First aired	Last aired	Winner	Finalists				Winning Coach	Main Host	1	2	3	4
1	23 Sep 2023	20 Apr 2024	Aslam Roshan	Sithuka Geenush; Siyoth Nimnada	Nimna Lakshitha; Sineth Lakmina	Vinuth Dewsitha	Nethuja Diloshan; Reshith Prasan	Pradeep Rangana	Nathasha Perera	Harshana	Uresha	Pradeep	Nadini
