= Nimal Mendis =

Sri Lankan singer-songwriter (1934–2015)

Nimal Mendis (නිමල් මෙන්ඩිස්)
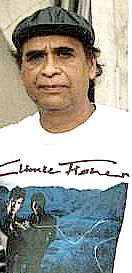
- The distinguished Sri Lanka born singer/songwriter Nimal Mendis

Background information
- Born: 29 March 1934
- Origin: Colombo, Sri Lanka
- Died: 16 April 2015 (aged 81)
- Genres: Rock, pop, piano rock, Sri Lankan music
- Occupations: Singer-songwriter, musician
- Instruments: Vocals; Piano; Keyboards; Guitar
- Years active: 1958–2015
- Labels: Decca, Columbia Records, Fontana, Metronome, Kandyan Records
- Formerly of: Top of the Pops

Nimal Mendis (1934–2015) was a Sri Lankan singer and songwriter, and was one of a handful of Sri Lankan musicians to appear on the BBC television programme Top of the Pops (1968). Mendis was a longstanding member of the Performing Rights Society and the Mechanical Copyright Protection Society of Great Britain.

Mendis was discovered in the late 1950s by Radio Ceylon, which dominated the airwaves in South Asia in the era. The station backed Mendis' songs from the outset, including "Kandyan Express", turning them into hits in South Asia: so much so that listeners from all over the Indian sub-continent wrote in to Radio Ceylon requesting his songs.

Mendis had been involved with music from his early childhood, and has lived for many years in London travelling often to Sri Lanka. He has also lived at Le Paradis in the Charente, the South West of France, for five years with his wife Ranjani. Mendis was married to Ranjani for 33 years until her death in 2010, and has one son, Paulmarie, with whom Mendis ran Mediaeye Productions.

The devastation of the 2004 tsunami moved Mendis, leading him to compose a song to aid the victims. This was recorded in Australia, Sri Lanka and the United Kingdom, and was commended by the British Parliament in early day motion 638, sponsored by MP Linda Perham.

== Biography ==
=== Early years: 1950s–1960s ===
Mendis has 22 songs published in Britain and has written music for films in Sri Lanka. "Kiss Kiss Kiss" was Mendis's first song that was recorded in Britain and sung by Mary Marshall on the Columbia label. "Kandyan Express", "Cherry Blossom Tree", "Oh My Lover", "Butterfly in the Rain", "Champagne Blues", and "Goodnight Kisses "' were number-one hits in Sri Lanka in the late fifties.

"Kandyan Dance", an instrumental, was his second piece in the West. Recorded by Friedel Berlipp and his Orchestra in Germany it went on to be number two on Radio Luxembourg. It was also released in the United States. Black Pearls & Green Diamonds has eight of Mendis's songs on an LP for Decca by One Two and Three, a folk group in Britain. This album is now a collector's item.

Mendis appeared on the popular BBC television music programme Top of the Pops with his singing partner Sandra Edema in 1968 as guest artists with his song "Feel like a Clown". The B-side of the record "Rainbow Land" was the A-side in the States and today (2013), it has become a collector's item in the Psychedelic Rock community in the west. They were also featured with the song on Beat Club in Germany that year. Eugene Wright, bass player with the original Dave Brubeck Quartet, arranged and recorded five of Mendis's songs with only him playing bass. He also arranged and produced one other song, "Singing Fish", with electric guitar, bass, and piano. They were sung by Sandra Edema.

=== 1970s ===
Mendis recorded a number of songs in London, mostly of a spiritual nature. He also made a twenty-minute audio documentary on the Way of the Cross called The Passion Report; another audio documentary called Ferryman focused on the tea estate-worker and the farmer in Sri Lanka, tracing their history from the British colonial period. He also wrote Bread of Life for the Eucharistic Congress in Sri Lanka.

Mendis has written several memorable songs for Sri Lankan films, most notably "Master Sir" for the film Kalu Diya Dhahara ("A column of black water"), where Neela Wickramasinghe performed it over the title sequence. "Master Sir" is about colonial Sri Lanka, narrating a story about the dignity of labour- a story about social justice. The song was recorded both in English (by Mendis and Sandra Edema) and Sinhala (by Neville Fernando; lyrics translated to Sinhala by Karunaratne Abeysekera). The song has remained a hit in Sri Lanka for over thirty years, mostly as a result of Neela Wickramasinghe's popularized version based on the musical arrangement of the English version (time signature, riffs etc.).

His composition Ganga Addara ("By the Banks of the River"), translated into Sinhala by Augustus Vinayagaratnam, and sung by Vijaya Kumaranatunga, for the film of the same name (directed by Sumitra Peiris), is also popular. The hit Ran Tikiri Sina was written for the same film and sung by Victor Silva and Nirasha Perera. In 2013 a new version of the song Ganga Addara was sung by Surendra Perera and used as the theme song for a teledrama series of the same name. "Upul Nuwan" was another classic composed for the 1978 Lester James Peiris film White Flowers for the Dead.

=== 1980s ===
In the 1980s, Mendis went into the production of documentary films with his wife- their son Paulmarie, deft with computers and editing visuals, assisted them. He was only seven years old when he accompanied his parents filming in the war zones of the North and East of Sri Lanka. Mendis also did a stageshow It's What I Am with Sri Lankan musicians; the highlight was the song "July '83", based on the ethnic riots of that year. He also made two audio cassettes, one for Air Lanka- A Taste of Paradise, and the other for the Ceylon Tourist Board- Pilgrim Places of Sri Lanka.

=== 1990s–2015 ===
The Mendis family formed their own enterprise, Mediaeye Music Lanka (PVT) Ltd., which released an audio documentary, War is my Country, in 2000, tracing the ethnic conflict in Sri Lanka up to 1994. This CD contained archive material over a period of seventeen years with narration, interviews with political and other personalities, songs and poems.

Together with his son, Paulmarie, Mendis continued to compile songs, audio documentaries and film material on CD and DVD. Through Mediaeye, they worked closely with various large organisations in Sri Lanka, working on projects such as Sirasa Superstar (Sri Lanka's equivalent of American Idol/Xfactor) and interacting with many young artists in the country. In 2009 they completed a ten-minute piece for SriLankan Airlines showcasing the company's new uniforms; this, as well as one of Mendis' songs "And A Star" by Generation 4 (four of the Sirasa Superstars), which was used by the airline as a boarding video in 2011 and again during Christmas 2013.

Mendis wrote three songs for Sumitra Peries' film "Vaishnavee" as well as the background score, which was arranged and produced by Paulmarie.

In 2013 he wrote the first ever Sinhala blues song, "Girls", which was sung by Amila Sandaruwan. It was translated into Sinhala by Duminda Allahendra who has also translated some of Mendis's new material. The music video for the song was produced by the students of the Digital Film Institute of Sri Lanka.

Mendis died on 16 April 2015 at a private hospital in Malabe, Colombo, at the age of 81.

== Television documentaries ==
Dawn of Terror, Mendis' first documentary, focused on the country's ethnic conflict, and is regarded an anti-war film. It was made for the Centre for Society and Religion in Sri Lanka and despite being produced on VHS was taken for distribution by Concord Video and Film in the UK.

Shattered Pearl spotlighted women affected by the war in Sri Lanka and the "right to life" was made for Channel 4 television in London. It was a major film by Sri Lankans on British TV at the time. It has been shown in many parts of the world.

Three Women Speak Out was made for "Article 19" in Britain, on the freedom of opinion and expression. Mediaeye also edited Z for Zero Concern on homeless children in London for the Children's Society.

Water Water Everywhere, filmed in Bangladesh, is on women and water-management, made for CAFOD.

Blessed Are the Poor compares poverty in Britain and South India and the positive effort people make to change their lives. This documentary was made for the Methodist International.

Mediaeye has also served as researchers for three major British TV productions. Three of their documentaries were at the Monticatini Film Festival in Italy: Shattered Pearl, Seyllan to Paradise, and Stop Killing Start Singing (which was based on three songs). It was the first time that Sinhala songs were featured as a documentary.

== See also ==
- List of Nimal Mendis songs
- List of Sri Lankan musicians
- Sri Lanka Broadcasting Corporation
- Vernon Corea
