= The Voice Sri Lanka =

Sri Lankan singing competition series

- ද වොයිස් ශ්‍රී ලංකා; தி வாய்ஸ் ஸ்ரீலங்கா
- Genre: Reality television; Singing competition
- Created by: John de Mol Jr.
- Based on: The Voice franchise
- Directed by: Samith Rangika Basnayaka
- Presented by: Dinithi Walgamage; Kingsley Rathnayake; Sumiran Dhananjaya Gunasekara
- Judges: Kasun Kalhara; Bathiya and Santhush; Sashika Nisansala; Umaria Sinhawansa; Supun Perera; Raini Charuka; Hirushi Jayasena; Mihindu Ariyaratne
- Composer: Asela Bandara
- Country of origin: Sri Lanka
- Original languages: Sinhala, English
- No. of seasons: 3
- No. of episodes: 200–300

Production
- Producer: Waruna Karunarathna
- Production locations: Ratmalana, Sri Lanka – Stein Studios Sri Lanka
- Animators: Mahinda Nagahawatta; Lahiru Hashan; Chamath Gunasekara
- Editors: Lalith Wasantha, Pubudu Wanigasekara
- Camera setup: Multi-camera
- Running time: 1 hour and 30 minutes
- Production companies: Stein Studios Sri Lanka; MTV/MBC; ITV Studios

Original release
- Network: Sirasa TV
- Release: 21 November 2020 – present

Related
- The Voice Teens; The Voice Kids

The Voice Sri Lanka is a Sri Lankan singing reality competition television series broadcast on Sirasa TV. It premiered on 21 November 2020 and has continued airing with yearly seasons ever since. The series is based on the original Dutch singing competition, The Voice of Holland, created by media producer John de Mol Jr., and is part of the international The Voice franchise.

Contestants are selected by a panel of four judges (known as "coaches") who face away from the contestants, judging the singers solely on their vocal ability. If a coach wants the performing contestant on their team, they press a button which turns their chair, revealing the singer's appearance. If more than one coach turns, the contestant chooses which coach's team to join.

The coaches have varied across seasons. In Seasons 1 and 2, the panel included Bathiya and Santhush, Kasun Kalhara, Sashika Nisansala, and Umaria Sinhawansa. Season 2 introduced a fifth coach, Supun Perera, who led a "Comeback Stage" team. Season 3 replaced the original four with new coaches: Supun Perera, Mihindu Ariyaratne, Raini Charuka, and Hirushi Jayasena. The show follows the success of its teenage predecessor, The Voice Teens, which spawned further spin-offs like The Voice Kids.

The series has produced three winners: Harith Wijeratne (Team Umaria), Rameesh Sashinka (Team Supun), and Imesh Sandeepa (Team Supun). Winners are chosen by television viewers voting via SMS in the final stages of the competition.

== Format ==
=== Blind auditions ===
The journey begins with the Blind Auditions. Coaches sit in "turned-away" chairs, judging contestants based purely on their voice. If a coach is impressed, they press the "I Want You" button to rotate their chair. If multiple coaches turn, the contestant chooses which team to join.

In Season 3, the Block Button feature was introduced. A coach can use this once or twice per season to prevent a rival coach from recruiting a specific contestant. The blocked coach can still turn their chair, but they are disqualified from being chosen by that artist.

=== Battle rounds ===
Once teams are formed, coaches pair two of their own artists to perform a powerful duet. After the performance, the coach must make the difficult decision of who stays. Each coach is granted a "Steal," allowing them to save a contestant eliminated by another coach and bring them onto their own team.

=== Knockouts ===
Unlike other versions where coaches simply pick a winner from a pair, the Sri Lankan Knockouts have utilized the "Ranking Chairs" system since Season 2.

- Each team has a limited number of "Hot Seats" (usually three or four).
- After an artist performs, the coach decides if they deserve a chair.
- If all chairs are full and a better singer performs later, the coach can replace someone already sitting down.
- A contestant is only safe once the final artist on their team has finished singing.

=== Super Knockouts ===
In Season 3, the Super Knockouts stage was introduced as an additional elimination round prior to the live broadcasts. Operating as a high-pressure filter, this stage pits contestants in direct, head-to-head performances where coaches make immediate eliminations to rapidly thin the field. Unlike standard Knockout rounds—which often utilize a Ranking Chairs mechanism—the Super Knockouts focus on high-stakes, multi-artist eliminations to select only the top tier of talent for subsequent pre-live or live rounds.

=== Play-offs ===
Serving as the final pre-recorded phase before the Live Shows, the Play-Offs (or Sing-Offs) act as the final hurdle for remaining contestants. In this stage, artists deliver individual solo performances, after which their respective coach must make the final cuts to assemble their elite team for the upcoming public-voting phase. The Voice Sri Lanka introduced the Play-Offs round during its second season, marking the first time the format stage was featured in an Asian adaptation of the show. The third season omitted the Play-Offs round.

=== Live shows ===
Unlike the pre-recorded pre-selection stages, the Live Shows mark the final phase of the competition where control shifts to the viewing public, who determine the outcome through SMS voting.

- Live Shows: The initial live broadcast phase features the remaining group of qualified artists performing solo and group numbers. Contestants are progressively eliminated through a combination of public SMS votes and direct "coaches' saves." Because of the large number of contestants advancing from the earlier stages, Season 1 divided the initial live phase into two sections, titled "Live Shows" and "Live Shows Round 2."
- Quarter-finals: As the competition field shrinks, production scale increases with expanded set designs, custom staging, and backing dancers. Only the highest-voted performers from each team advance to this stage.
- Semi-finals: Serving as the penultimate round of the competition, each coach's team is typically reduced to two remaining artists. Public voting exclusively determines which single artist from each team advances to represent their coach in the Grand Finale.
- Grand Finale: The season concludes with a grand live finale event where the remaining finalists perform hit songs alongside guest artists and special duets with their respective coaches. The artist who receives the highest number of votes is crowned the winner, earning the title of The Voice along with a grand cash prize and a recording contract.

== Coaches and presenters ==
=== Coaches ===
- Umaria Sinhawansa – A celebrated Sri Lankan singer known for her powerful vocals and stage presence. She was a coach in Seasons 1 and 2, and led Team Umaria to victory in Season 1.
- Bathiya and Santhush (BnS) – A musical duo famous for blending Sinhala pop with hip-hop and R&B. They coached during Seasons 1 and 2 and were instrumental in mentoring finalists.
- Kasun Kalhara – A soulful vocalist and composer known for his emotional ballads. Kasun was a coach in the first two seasons.
- Sashika Nisansala – One of the most popular and honoured singers with a strong background in playback singing and north indian classical and folk music . She has performed more than 70 teledrama theme songs and over 20 film songs. She coached in Seasons 1 and 2.
- Supun Perera – Initially introduced as the "Fifth Coach" for the Comeback Stage in Season 2. He became a full-time coach and led Team Supun to back-to-back wins in Seasons 2 and 3.
- Mihindu Ariyaratne – A prominent pop-rock artist known for his energetic performances. He debuted as a coach in Season 3.
- Raini Charuka – A pop singer and entertainer with deep roots in the local music industry, joined the panel in Season 3. She had previously coached on The Voice Teens.
- Hirushi Jayasena – Known for her versatility and youth appeal, Hirushi was introduced as a new coach in Season 3.

=== Presenters ===
- Dinithi Walgamage – An actress who hosted the Blind Auditions during Season 1.
- Kingsley Rathnayake – Took over hosting duties during the Battle Rounds in Season 1.
- Sumiran Dhananjaya Gunasekara – Became the principal presenter from the Knockouts of Season 1 onwards, and hosted all of Seasons 2 and 3.

=== Timeline of coaches ===
Coach	Seasons		
Coach	1	2	3
Kasun Kalhara			—N/a
Bathiya and Santhush			—N/a
Sashika Nisansala			—N/a
Umaria Sinhawansa			—N/a
Supun Perera	—N/a		
Mihindu Ariyaratne	—N/a		
Raini Charuka	—N/a		
Hirushi Jayasena	—N/a		

=== Timeline of presenters ===
Presenter	Seasons		
Presenter	1	2	3
Dinithi Walgamage		—N/a	—N/a
Kingsley Rathnayake		—N/a	—N/a
Sumiran Dhananjaya Gunasekara			

=== Coaches' gallery ===
Coaches gallery

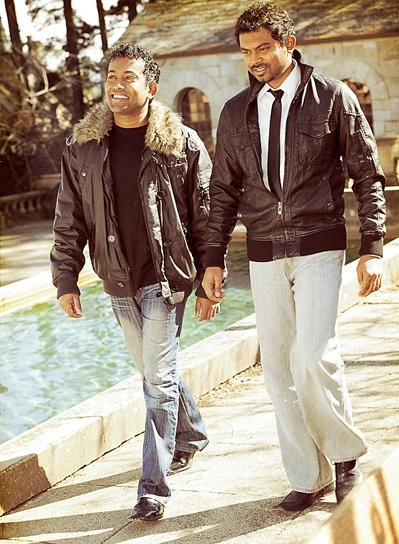
BnS (1–2)

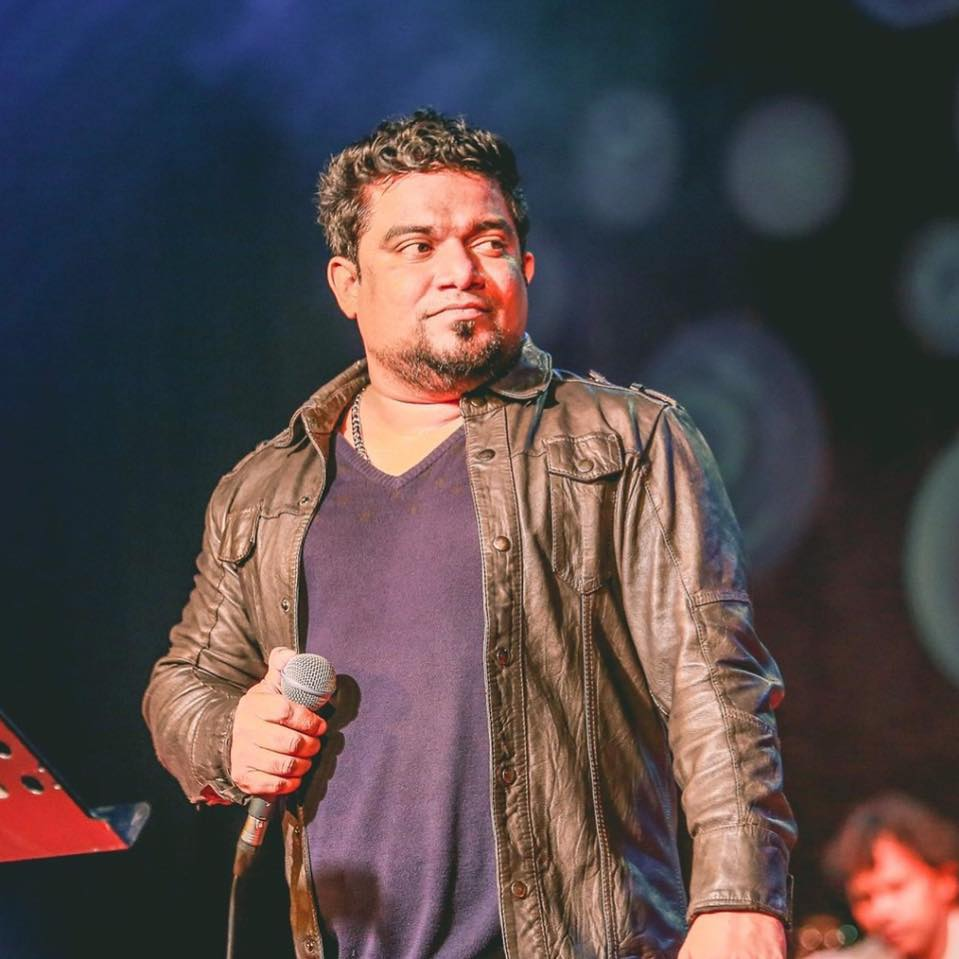
Kasun Kalhara (1–2)

sashika Nisansala (1–2)

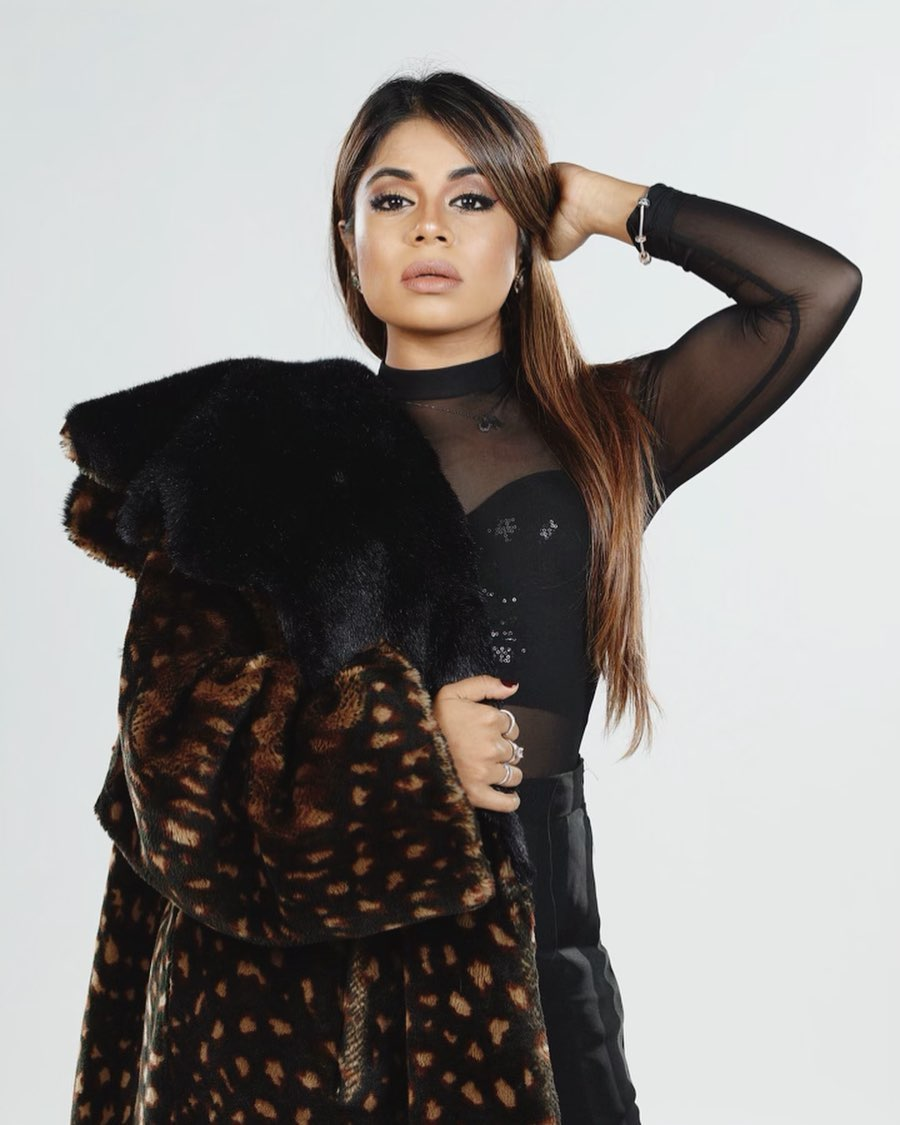
Umaria Sinhawansa (1–2)

Supun Perera (2–3)

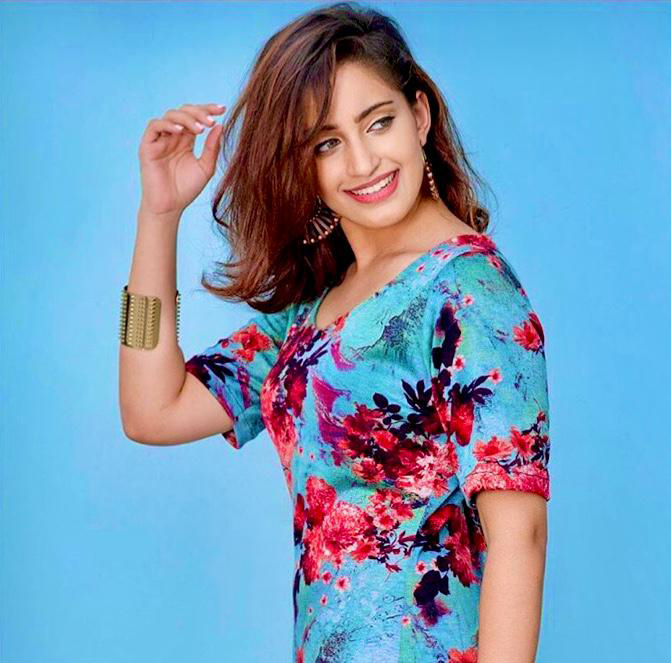
Hirushi Jayasena (3)

Raini Charuka Goonatillake (3)

Mihindu Ariyaratne (3)

== Coaches' teams and their artists ==
In each season, coaches choose a number of acts to progress to the live shows. This table shows, for each season, which artists advanced to the finals.

Key

Winner
Finalist

Season	Team Kasun	Team BnS	Team Sashika	Team Umaria	
1	Thilina Sudesh	Julius Mitchell	Miyuru Somarathne	Harith Wijeratne	
2	Team Kasun	Team BnS	Team Sashika	Team Umaria	Team Supun
2	Chanupa Deshitha	Chinthaka Roshan	Sheron Silva	Shehan Rangana	Rameesh Sashinka
3	Team Mihindu	Team Raini	Team Hirushi	Team Supun	—N/a
3	Rasindu Mihisara	Isaac Timothy	Lisara Fernando	Imesh Sandeepa	—N/a

== Series Overview ==
Artist's info

- Team Umaria
- Team BNS
- Team Sashika
- Team Kasun
- Team Supun
- Team Mihindu
- Team Raini
- Team Hirushi

Season	First aired	Last aired	Winner	Other finalists				Winning Coach	Main Host			Coaches' Chair Order (Left to Right)				
Season	First aired	Last aired	Winner	1	2	3	4	Winning Coach	Blind Auditions	Battles	Knockouts - Finals	1	2	3	4	Comeback
1	21 Nov 2020	11 Dec 2021	Harith Wijeratne	Julius Mitchell	Miyuru Somarathne	Thilina Sudesh	—	Umaria Sinhawansa	Dinithi Walgamage	Kingsly Rathnayaka	Sumiran D. Gunasekara	Umaria	BNS	Sashika	Kasun	—
2	29 Oct 2022	21 May 2023	Rameesh Sashinka	Chinthaka Roshan	Sheron Silva	Chanupa Deshitha	Shehan Rangana	Supun Perera	Sumiran Dhananjaya Gunasekara			Kasun	BNS	Sashika	Umaria	Supun
3	14 Dec 2024	14 June 2025	Imesh Sandeepa	Isaac Timothy	Lisara Fernando	Rasindu Mihisara	—	Supun Perera	Sumiran Dhananjaya Gunasekara			Mihindu	Raini	Hirushi	Supun	—

== Season summaries ==
=== Season 1 (2020–2021) ===
The first season of the show was aired from 21 November 2020 to 11 December 2021 on Sirasa TV. The first season was hosted by Dinithi Walgamage during the Blind Auditions, Kingsley Rathnayake during the Battle Rounds, and Sumiran Dhananjaya Gunasekara from the Knockouts onwards. The coaches were musical duo Bathiya and Santhush, singer and composer Kasun Kalhara, singer Sashika Nisansala, and singer Umaria Sinhawansa.

The winner was Harith Wijeratne from Team Umaria. The other finalists were Julius Mitchell, Miyuru Somarathne, and Thilina Sudesh. Harith was crowned the first winner of The Voice Sri Lanka following the grand finale on 11 December 2021.

=== Season 2 (2022–2023) ===
The second season of the show was aired from 29 October 2022 to 21 May 2023 on Sirasa TV. The season was hosted by Sumiran Dhananjaya Gunasekara. The coaches were Kasun Kalhara, Umaria Sinhawansa, and Sashika Nisansala, along with musical duo Bathiya and Santhush. Supun Perera joined the coaching panel as the fifth coach for the Comeback Stage, giving eliminated contestants an opportunity to return to the competition.

The winner was Rameesh Sashinka (Ramiya) from Team Supun. The other finalists were Chinthaka Roshan, Sheron Silva, Shehan Rangana and Chanupa Deshitha. Rameesh Sashinka became the second winner of The Voice Sri Lanka following the grand finale on 21 May 2023.

=== Season 3 (2024–2025) ===
The third season of the show was aired from 14 December 2024 to 14 June 2025 on Sirasa TV. The season was hosted by Sumiran Dhananjaya Gunasekara. The coaches were Supun Perera, Mihindu Ariyaratne, Raini Charuka, and Hirushi Jayasena. The season introduced a new coaching panel, with Supun Perera returning as a coach after serving as the fifth coach during the second season.

The season also introduced an all-new dynamic studio set built entirely in-house at Stein Studios—a first in the franchise’s Sri Lankan history. The updated studio featured a modern layout, a new LED panel floor, and the debut of the Block Button feature.

The winner was Imesh Sandeepa from Team Supun. The other finalists were Isaac Timothy, Lisara Fernando, and Rasindu Mihisara. Imesh Sandeepa was crowned the third winner of The Voice Sri Lanka following the grand finale on 14 June 2025.

== Coaches' results ==
Considering the final placement of the contestants who are members of their team (not the final placement of the coaches):

Coaches' results
Coach	Winner	Runner-up	Third place	Fourth place	Fifth place
Supun Perera	2 times (2, 3)	—N/a	—N/a	—N/a	—N/a
Umaria Sinhawansa	1 time (1)	—N/a	1 time (2)	—N/a	—N/a
Sashika Nisansala	—N/a	2 times (1, 2)	—N/a	—N/a	—N/a
Kasun Kalhara	—N/a	—N/a	1 time (1)	1 time (2)	—N/a
Bathiya and Santhush	—N/a	—N/a	—N/a	1 time (1)	1 time (2)
Raini Charuka	—N/a	1 time (3)	—N/a	—N/a	—N/a
Mihindu Ariyarathne	—N/a	—N/a	1 time (3)	—N/a	—N/a
Hirushi Jayasena	—N/a	—N/a	—N/a	1 time (3)	—N/a

== Viewership ratings ==
Season	Premiere date	Finale date	No. of Episodes	Average Viewership (Est.)	Finale Viewership	Notes
1	21 November 2020	11 December 2021	80+	3 million	9.8 million	Strong debut season; popular online.
2	29 October 2022	21 May 2023	60+	1.5 million	6.2 million	Highest mid-season ratings.
3	14 December 2024	14 June 2025	50+	1 million	4.1 million	The Voice Sri Lanka Season 3 was marketed as the biggest digitalized show in Sri Lanka.

== Music and media ==
=== Promotional releases ===
The franchise has released official musical tracks featuring its coaching panels to mark different seasons:

- "Nim Him Sewwa" (Season 1 Promotional Single): Shortly after Season 1 debuted, the original coaching panel recorded a collaborative promotional single—a bilingual Sinhalese and English cover of Pandit W. D. Amaradeva's iconic 1978 classic "Nim Him Sewwa." The music video amassed over 1.2 million views online, and the arrangement became a staple in coach Umaria Sinhawansa's live concert setlists. The promotional video ended with the slogan "Celebrating Our Music Legends of Yesterday, Today, and Tomorrow," leading the public to refer to the original coach panel as the "Legend Coaches."
- "Yaksha Pelapatha" (Season 3 Theme Song): Marking the return of the show for its third season, the new coaching panel—Mihindu Ariyaratne, Hirushi Jayasena, Raini Charuka, and Supun Perera—released the official theme song "Yaksha Pelapatha" (යක්ෂ පෙළපත). Written by Chandana Sooriyabandara and composed by Tharindu Ranathunga, the high-energy track reflected the season’s revamped, youth-oriented branding.

== Related series ==
The Voice Teens was the first Sri Lankan adaptation of The Voice and preceded the launch of the adult version, The Voice Sri Lanka. The series premiered on Sirasa TV in 2020 and was followed by the adult version later that year. The success of The Voice Teens contributed to the expansion of the The Voice format in Sri Lanka, with The Voice Sri Lanka subsequently launching in November 2020. The teen version has aired three seasons. The Voice Kids was later introduced as a children's version of the franchise in Sri Lanka.

=== The Voice Teens ===
The Voice Teens is the teenage version of The Voice in Sri Lanka. It premiered on Sirasa TV in February 2020 and is aimed at teenage singers. The first season was won by Hashen Dulanjana from Team Sanuka.The second season was won by Pranirsha Thiyagaraja from Team Abhisheka. The third season was won by Janiru Kavinda from Team Sanka

=== The Voice Kids ===
The Voice Kids is the children's version of The Voice in Sri Lanka. It was introduced on Sirasa TV in 2023 as another age-specific version of the franchise, following The Voice Teens and The Voice Sri Lanka.

== Reception ==
The The Voice franchise has developed a presence in Sri Lankan television through its adult, teen and children's adaptations. The programmes have also maintained an online presence through official performance videos, promotional releases and other digital content.

The official The Voice Sri Lanka and Sirasa TV platforms have published performances from the programme, including Blind Auditions, Battles, Knockouts, Super Knockouts, Live Shows and finale performances. The franchise maintains a strong digital footprint, with contest performances, promotional clips, and post-performance "V Clapper" content consistently drawing millions of views online.

The franchise's official YouTube material has also included performances that have been distributed through the international The Voice digital ecosystem. During Season 3, News 1st reported that more than 51 performances from the Sri Lankan programme had appeared on the official The Voice Global platform.

By October 2023, the programme's official YouTube channel had accumulated more than 684 million total views, according to material associated with the franchise. This figure should be treated as a historical snapshot because YouTube view counts change over time.

== See also ==
- The Voice Teens (Sri Lankan TV series)
- The Voice Kids (Sri Lankan TV series)
- The Voice (franchise)
